= Mary Mihelakos =

Australian music promoter and journalist

Mary Mihelakos is an Australian music promoter and journalist. In 2020, she was inducted into the Music Victoria hall of fame.

== Career ==
Mihelakos began working as a volunteer for Melbourne radio station 3RRR when she was 14, helping with administration, compiling gig guides, and meeting band managers. Through these connections she began booking bands for the Punters Club at 17, before moving to the nearby Evelyn Hotel. She studied media and journalism at Swinburne University of Technology and during her first year became manager for The Earthmen.

Beginning in 1995, Mihelakos was editor of Melbourne's music street press title Beat Magazine, after previously contributing writing to them as a student.

In 2003, Mihelakos and Glenn Dickie started the Aussie BBQ showcase of Australian music at South by Southwest (SXSW) in Austin, Texas. Their initiative paved the way for Sounds Australia who have continued promoting Australian music at events such as SXSW. Mihelakos licensing the Aussie BBQ brand to Sounds Australia, and handed the event to them in 2013.

After leaving Beat in 2005, between 2009 and 2016 she wrote 'Sticky Carpet', a music column in The Age newspaper, focusing on Melbourne's live music scene.

Beginning in 2013, Mihelakos founded and produced the annual music festival Leaps and Bounds for City of Yarra.

In 2020, she was inducted into the Music Victoria's hall of fame alongside blues singer Chris Wilson for the 15th Annual Music Victoria Awards.

Between 2021 and 2024, she was music booker for the Brunswick Ballroom. The venue was reopened in 2021 with the Ballroom Blitz, a three-day music festival created by Mihelakos and venue director Will Ewing.

== Awards ==
=== Music Victoria Awards ===
The Music Victoria Awards are an annual awards night celebrating Victorian music. They commenced in 2005.

Year	Nominee / work	Award	Result
Music Victoria Awards of 2020	Mary Mihelakos	Hall of Fame	inductee
