= Music Victoria Awards =

Annual Australian music award

- Awarded for: An annual Awards night celebrating Victorian music.
- Location: Melbourne, Victoria
- Country: Australia
- Presented by: Music Victoria
- First award: 2006; 20 years ago
- Final award: Current
- Website: musicvictoriaawards.com.au

The Music Victoria Awards (previously known as The Age EG Awards and The Age Music Victoria Awards) are an annual awards night celebrating music from the Australian state of Victoria. They commenced in 2006 and are awarded in Melbourne Music Week between October and December. The awards were initially an exclusively online public-voted awards, changing in 2013.

From 2020, to be eligible, all nominations must be taken from music released between July of the previous year to June of the current year, to bring the awards in line with the past financial year.

Since 2022, the event has occurred at the Edge at Federation Square, Melbourne.

== History and eligibility ==
Patrick Donovan started the awards in 2006 to celebrate The Age Entertainment Guide's 21st anniversary. The 2006 awards were a retrospective ceremony and winners came from the past 21 years. The event occurred at the Prince Bandroom, St Kilda.

Donovan ran the awards for six years as The Age EG Music Awards before leaving The Age in 2011. Mary Mihelakos ran them in 2012 and 2013, and Belinda Collins from 2014. In 2018, Laura Imbruglia produced the event and a range of new changes were introduced, including significant category changes. 2018 was the final year of the partnership with The Age. Since 2019, the awards continue titled Music Victoria Awards.

To be eligible, at least 50% of the act has been living in Victoria for the last two years, or uses Melbourne as a home base. Solo artists must reside in Victoria to be eligible (residency of backing band is not considered).

Award categories have changed over the years, and consist of public voted, industry voted awards and Legend/Hall of Fame inductions.

From 2012 to 2014, the genre specific categories were awarded in October and the public voted awards in November, however, these have been merged into one event since the 2015 event. In 2021, The Awards will introduce a new category to represent the achievements and contributions of disabled and deaf musicians.

The event was held at Prince Bandroom, St Kilda (2006–2011), Billboard (2012–2013), 170 Russell (2014–2017), The Melbourne Recital Centre (2018–2021) and the Edge Federation Square (2022 to present).

== Awards by year ==
To see the full article for a particular year, please click on the year link.

=== 2006–2012 ===
The Age Entertainment Guide Awards
Year	Best Album	Best Song	Legend / Hall of Fame Inductee
2006	Crowded House – Woodface (1991)	The Church – "Under the Milky Way" (1988)	TISM
2007	Silverchair – Young Modern	Silverchair – "Straight Lines"	Kim Salmon
2008	Nick Cave and the Bad Seeds – Dig, Lazarus, Dig!!!	unknown	Died Pretty
2009	unknown	unknown	Painters and Dockers
2010	The Holidays – Post Paradise	Little Red – "Rock It"	Paul Kelly
2011	The Wagons – Rumble, Shake & Tumble	Gotye with Kimbra – "Somebody That I Used to Know"	Hoodoo Gurus, Stephen Walker
2012	Alpine A is for Alpine	Tame Impala – "Elephant"	Weddings Parties Anything, Ian Rumbold

=== 2013–present ===
Music Victoria Awards
Year	Album of the Year	Song of the Year	Best Live Act	Hall of Fame Inductee
2013	Paul Kelly – Spring and Fall	Vance Joy – "Riptide"	The Drones	Renée Geyer, Michael Gudinski
2014	Dan Sultan – Blackbird	Courtney Barnett – "Avant Gardener"	Saskwatch	Daddy Cool, Ed Nimmervoll
2015	Courtney Barnett – Sometimes I Sit and Think, and Sometimes I Just Sit	Courtney Barnett – "Depreston"	The Smith Street Band	John Farnham, AC/DC, Olivia Newton-John, Archie Roach, Palais Theatre, Sunbury Festival, The Seekers, Thunderbirds, Stan Rofe, Bill Armstrong
2016	King Gizzard & the Lizard Wizard – Nonagon Infinity	The Drones – "Taman Shud"	King Gizzard & the Lizard Wizard	Triple R
2017	A.B. Original – Reclaim Australia	King Gizzard & the Lizard Wizard – "Rattlesnake"	King Gizzard & the Lizard Wizard	Tony Cohen
2018	Courtney Barnett – Tell Me How You Really Feel	Baker Boy – "Marryuna"	Baker Boy	Chrissy Amphlett, Molly Meldrum
2019	The Teskey Brothers – Run Home Slow	The Teskey Brothers – "So Caught Up"	King Gizzard & the Lizard Wizard	PBS 106.7FM, Vika & Linda Bull
2020	Sampa the Great – The Return	Sampa the Great – "OMG"	Amyl and the Sniffers	Mary Mihelakos, Chris Wilson
2021	Emma Donovan & The Putbacks – Crossover	Hiatus Kaiyote – "Red Room"	Amyl and the Sniffers	Kylie Minogue, Pierre Baroni

Music Victoria Awards
Year	Best Album	Best Song	Best Group	Best Solo Act	Hall of Fame Inductee
2022	Baker Boy – Gela	Baker Boy – "Survive"	Emma Donovan & The Putbacks	Julia Jacklin	Deborah Conway
2023	Cash Savage and the Last Drinks – So This is Love	Julia Jacklin – "Love, Try Not to Let Go"	Cable Ties	Jen Cloher	Kutcha Edwards and Kirsty Rivers
2024	Angie McMahon- Light, Dark, Light Again	Jess Ribeiro – "Summer of Love"	Gut Health	Maple Glider	Ollie Olsen and The Push (Australian youth music organisation)
2025	no awards in 2025				
