= Music magazines published in Australia =

History of Australian music journalism publications

Music magazines have been published in Australia since the 1950s. They began to emerge more prominently in the 1960s and peaked in popularity throughout the 1970s and 1980s, but several national titles remain in existence, including local editions of Rolling Stone and the classical music-focused Limelight, amongst others.

== History ==
=== Early years: 1980s ===
The first music magazines in Australia began during the 1950s and were focused around youth and pop stars of the day. During the early 1960s titles included Teens Today, Teen Topics, Fan Forum, Australian Rock and Pop Stars, and Young Modern. They weren't viewed as being very serious, and by the mid-60s had ceased publishing, and it wasn't until 1966 when Go-Set was launched that Australia had its first successful national music magazine.

Go-Set was founded by Philip Frazer, and is considered to have laid the foundations for the Australian music press industry. It was published weekly from 2 February 1966 to 24 August 1974. The magazine had two offshoot titles, Revolution which ran from 1 May 1970 to 1 August 1971, and High Times which ran August 1971 to 1 January 1972. In the fourth issue of Revolution, Rolling Stone Australia was included as a supplement. It became its own magazine in January 1972.

Australian Dance Band News had been founded in 1932, and later became Music Maker in 1960. It focused on jazz, both international and Australian jazz. It ceased publication in 1972 and was absorbed into Soundblast which ran another year.

During the 1970s Juke Magazine and its main competitor Rock Australia Magazine (RAM) started. Juke ran from 1975 to 1993 and was published weekly in Melbourne, while RAM was published fortnightly in Sydney from 1975 to 1989. RAM republished articles from English magazine New Musical Express (NME) alongside new Australian content.

Outside of Melbourne and Sydney, Roadrunner was published in Adelaide as a monthly music magazine between 1978 and 1983. In 2019 an anthology of articles from the magazine was published in a book titled The Big Beat.

Between 1982 and 1987, the ABC TV series program Countdown had their own magazine and annual. Other music titles formed during this period included Australian Smash Hits (1984–2007), TV Hits (1988–2005), cassette magazine Fast Forward (1980–1982), classical music magazine ABC Radio 24 Hours (1976–current), and several others.

=== Internet magazines: 1990s–present ===
The 1990s saw several new magazines founded. Rhythms Magazine began in 1992, focused on Americana music such as blues, folk, and jazz. Juice, which included articles reprinted from Spin, was launched in March 1993 but closed its doors in 2003 after circulation dropped in its last three years from a reported 25,000 to only 6,000.

In 1994, the Music Network was started, and ran for 925 issues until 2013. Drum Scene launched in 1995, focused on drumming, following the percussion newsletter In The Groove.

Recovery launched in 1998, as a spinoff from the popular ABC TV series, and ran for 25 issues until 2000. The ABC's Triple J radio station launched their own J Mag in 2005, eventually changing its name to Triple J Magazine, and then moving to an annual format before closing in 2015. ABC Radio 24 Hours was rebranded Limelight in 2003 and has continued to publish regularly about classical music.

Online music websites Mess+Noise, the Vine, FasterLouder and inthemix each had their own following, but were either merged or shut down as they were assimilated into Junkee Media. Nearly two decades of past content was erased during the process.Martin, Joshua (16 January 2019). "Is there a future for Australian music journalism?". Crikey. Mess+Noise had begun in 2005 as a bimonthly print publication and was one of the most widely viewed websites in Australia before it was closed.Toller, Annie (3 August 2015). "What went wrong at Mess+Noise?". Daily Review. Archived from the original on 8 January 2016. The print edition ended in 2007 with their 14th issue.

Blunt launched in 1999 as an Australian alternative music magazine, initially in print before expanding into digital publishing. The publication focused on rock and alternative culture. During the mid-2010s the website grew into one of Australia's most widely read alternative music publications before the original digital archive was removed following a change in ownership.

Swampland launched in 2016 and focused on longform writing, earning it comparisons to Mess+Noise.D'Souza, Shaad (1 May 2017). "The Australian Magazine that Had to Happen". Broadsheet. The magazine also stood out for not running album reviews, and for focusing on Australian music.Frostick, James (27 June 2018). "Feature: Swampland Magazine and the fight for long-form". Weirdo Wasteland. It closed in 2019."About". Swampland.

== Australia's street press ==
Beginning in the late 1970s, Australia had a strong street press culture, with titles in each state. They were available free and were often published weekly.

The popularity and frequency of the street press are credited with killing off the paid weekly music magazines during the 1990s, with Juke and RAM falling to their free competitors Beat and Drum Media.

In 2020, most street press across Australia closed due to COVID-19. In 2022 the remaining national titles are Mixdown and scenestr, while Canberra's BMA has become Australia's longest-running street press after Beat moved completely online.

== Current titles ==
Whilst there have been several Australian music magazines running concurrently during the 1970s and 1980s, there are still a significant mix of national magazines widely available in newsagents (Rolling Stone, Rhythms, Limelight, Blunt), and smaller independent titles available in record stores or online (Foley Magazine, Women in Pop). The following are in print:

- Australian Guitar
- Blunt Magazine
- DRUMscene (and spinoff Percussion Scene)
- Foley Magazine
- Limelight
- NME Australia
- Rhythms Magazine
- Rolling Stone Australia
- Tamworth Country Music Capital
- Trad&Now
- Women in Pop

Of these, NME Australia is owned by Singapore based music company BandLab Technologies and is a spin off of the English magazine, while Rolling Stone Australia is licensed from the American company Penske Media Corporation. The original run of Rolling Stone Australia ended in 2018 before being relaunched again in 2020 by the Brag Media, publishers of the Music Network. Australian Guitar is part of Guitar World, an American magazine owned by NewBay Media. They published their 146th Australian issue in January 2022.

Outside of the popular music focus of NME, Rolling Stone and Blunt, the remaining titles tend to focus around niche subjects, such as Rhythms and Trad&Now (Americana), Limelight (classical), and DRUMscene (drumming). Others like Foley are produced independently, and aren't as widely available. Music zines are also available in print and online and serve local focuses, such as Gimmie Gimmie Gimmie Zine, an independent publication covering emerging artists and underground music scenes. These are often printed in limited quantities and are available to purchase in speciality stores or online.

== See also ==
- Australian music publications of the 60s
- Music street press of Australia
- List of music magazines
