= Larry Heath =

Australian publisher and music events organiser

Larry Heath is an Australian publisher, events organiser, and entrepreneur. He is the founder-owner of Heath Media, which publishes online magazine The AU Review and hosts the National Live Music Awards. As of 2023 Heath is associate producer at Sounds Australia, and is based in Toronto, Canada.

== Biography ==
As a child, Larry Heath provided voice-overs for Radio Disney. He created a web and graphic design company while still in high school, then ran an online store and, briefly, an online publication. After completing high school, he attended Sydney University.

Heath founded The AU Review as a personal blog in August 2008, but running it soon became his full-time occupation. Heath Media was registered as a business name in June 2009.

Heath attended the WAM Festival conference in Perth in 2010 and 2014. He has been a judge for several music awards, including the ARIAs, Music Victoria Awards, Australian Music Prize (AMP), and AIR Awards.

He has created opportunities at international trade events, and participated in trade delegations to India in 2012, and the East Coast Music Awards on Prince Edward Island, Canada in 2019.

Heath directed the AU Live Music Awards in 2014 and 2015 under the auspices of Heath Media – the first awards dedicated solely to contemporary live music in Australia since the Jack Awards ended in 2007. They were the precursor to the National Live Music Awards (NLMAs), which have been run each year since 2016 save 2021 and 2022 owing to the COVID-19 pandemic in Australia. In 2019 the NLMAs were held in Canberra as well as Brisbane, Sydney, Melbourne, Adelaide, Launceston, Alice Springs, and Fremantle, and the categories were expanded to include jazz and classical music.

In January 2016 Heath left the role as editor-in-chief of The AU Review, in order to focus on the expansion of its parent company, Heath Media, into international media and events, including the NLMAs. That same year, he released the music video for "Laura", a cover of the Bat For Lashes song by Amanda Palmer and Brendan Maclean, which he directed.

In May 2017 Heath was appointed A&R Manager in Australia & New Zealand for Music Sales Creative. While at the company, he signed a number of artists including Beks, Harts, Jack Carty, Donny Benet and more. He also was Creative Producer on the collaborative Chess Records tribute record "Everybody Knows I'm Here", which was released in June 2022. He left this role in December 2022.

In January 2020, Heath was appointed associate producer at Sounds Australia, at the same time as singer-songwriter Leah Flanagan joined the team. He had previously collaborated with the team at Sounds Australia, including co-presenting "Jet Lag Sessions" at the CMJ conference in New York City from 2011 to 2013. He began his work there by attending the Folk Alliance International in New Orleans.

As of September 2023 Heath was based in Toronto, Canada, and still associate producer at Sounds Australia.

== The AU Review ==
The AU Review online magazine was launched by founding editor and publisher Larry Heath in Sydney on 6 August 2008, and contained reviews of Vampire Weekend and Little Red at The Metro Theatre in Sydney. At this time it covered only Sydney, then expanded to cover Melbourne soon afterwards. It initially focused only on live music and albums of local and international artists, including at the SXSW festival in Austin, Texas. It was first in to review acts such as Chet Faker, Flume, Vance Joy, Amy Shark, and Gang of Youths.

The website was upgraded and expanded in September 2009, with content covering Byron Bay, the Gold Coast, and Brisbane. By May 2011, cities covered included Adelaide, Hobart, Canberra, Launceston, Wollongong, and Perth. Later, the focus expanded to include visual art, film, theatre, food, lifestyle, travel, and gaming. It is aimed at ages 18 to 25.

Sosefina Fuamoli was on the staff for over seven years, from about 2011 until 2018, taking up the position of editor-in-chief in January 2016. After her departure to a new role at triple j, the role was shared among team members.

On its 5th anniversary in 2013, boasting a monthly readership of 70,000+, The AU Review launched a crowdfunding campaign on Pozible, for it "is a 100% volunteer-based organisation", with the aim of supporting emerging Australian writers and photographers as well as musicians and live gigs. At that time, the publication covered "the arts, film, food, lifestyle, fashion, travel, Asian music and culture, and was about to start covering video games. It planned to relaunch with a series of events in major capital cities. In 2013 a sister publication, The Iris, launched to cover home entertainment, film, television, video games and tech content.

January 2016 saw Heath stepping down from his role editor-in-chief of The AU Review, to focus on other initiatives.

In August 2018, on the 10th anniversary of The AU Review, it was merged back into the single banner. Also in August 2018, the beta version of a new website was launched, which included all content of the previous website, and also promised 35% fewer ads, an enlarged travel, food, and lifestyle section, and easy-to-read reviews with a star rating out of five. To celebrate the anniversary, The AU Review held events at the Rocket Bar in Adelaide, and a stage party during BIGSOUND in Brisbane.

== Heath Media ==
In addition to ongoing projects The AU Review and the NLMAs, Heath Media, based in Sydney, has in the past also produced several print monographs, a project called Captured Australia, The Australian Music Week Film Festival (2018), and a website called Hello Asia!

Heath Media has also run the annual Courtyard Sessions at the Seymour Centre in Sydney.
