= Full Coverage =

2023 book by Samuel J. Fell

Full Coverage: A History of Rock Journalism in Australia
- Author: Samuel J. Fell
- Language: English
- Subject: Australia music journalism
- Genre: Non-fiction
- Publisher: Monash University Publishing
- Publication date: 1 September 2023
- Publication place: Australia
- Pages: 352 pp
- ISBN: 978-1-92-263393-4

Full Coverage: A History of Rock Journalism in Australia is a book of non-fiction by Samuel J. Fell published in 2023. It documents the rise of Australia's music journalism as published in Australian music magazines such as Go-Set, Juke Magazine, and the music street press.

Excerpts were published by Guardian Australia, The Australian, and Rhythms Magazine.

== Reception ==
David Nichols for The Conversation, wrote the book is the first history of Australia’s rock press, and noted there were things included they had "gained a new historical understanding of", but felt that Fell had also left out important aspects, such as the connection between the music presses and TV.

John Shand for The Sydney Morning Herald wrote, "the book becomes primarily a history of the birth pains and death throes" as it "concentrates on a thorough timeline of the rock periodicals: when and where they started and stopped, who edited them and who wrote for them." Shand wrote the book could have been improved by an index, or photos and samples of the journalism discussed, but he found the book engaging and was glad the history and publications have been documented.

Richie Black for ArtsHub wrote the book was a "breezy yet evocative read" as it explored the impact of evolving technologies from off-set printing to Facebook. Anthony Morris for Books+Publishing wrote, "It’s a must-read for anyone interested in a nuts-and-bolts history of the Australian music scene, detailing an often-overlooked side of the business that was essential in building and maintaining a local industry that today has changed beyond all recognition."
