= Moneta Eagles =

Australian composer and pianist (1924–2003)

- Born: 1924
- Died: 2003 (aged 78–79)
- Other name: Moneta M. Eagles
- Education: NSW State Conservatorium of Music
- Occupations: Composer, pianist
- Known for: Music for Australian Government documentary films

Moneta Eagles (1924–2003) was an Australian composer and pianist. She trained at the NSW State Conservatorium of Music in Sydney and won national composition prizes in 1953 and 1954. From 1951 she wrote music for documentary films made by the Australian Government, and through the 1950s and 1960s she scored many productions of the government film unit that became the Commonwealth Film Unit.

== Early life and education ==
Eagles was born in 1924. In a 2001 oral history interview for the National Library of Australia, she talked about her childhood and her brother Jim, who was also interested in film from an early age.

She studied piano at the State Conservatorium, and in 1947 received its performer's and teacher's diploma, which was presented to her by Eugene Goossens. She then won a three-year composition scholarship there. Her composition teachers were Goossens and Alex Burnard. In 1949 she sat the first-year examinations for the Conservatorium's fellowship in composition; she was the only candidate that year, and the fellowship had been awarded only twice before. She finished the scholarship course in 1950.

In 1951 Eagles went to England for a year to study with Mátyás Seiber. While in London she was at the first meeting of the Australian Musical Association in February 1952, a group set up to promote Australian composers and performers in Britain.

== Career ==
=== Pianist ===
Eagles was one of four pianists, with Richard Bonynge, selected as New South Wales semi-finalists in the ABC's 1949 Concerto and Vocal Competition. At the state final in May 1949 she played the first movement of Grieg's Piano Concerto. The Sydney Morning Herald reviewer thought her "fully adequate" to the work and noted her "fine technique"; the state title went to the bass-baritone Ronald Jackson. She later divided her working time between the piano and composition.

=== Concert music ===
By the end of 1949 she had written songs and piano pieces that Conservatorium students had performed in Sydney and Melbourne. Her Theme and Variations – Passacaglia for piano is dated 1948–49; it was recorded for the Anthology of Australian Music on Disc series, produced by Larry Sitsky and issued in 2003. The part-song The Path of Dreams had its first performance in November 1950. Her piano concerto Diversions was commissioned by the pianist Eileen Joyce.

In 1953 the South Australian branch of the Guild of Composers gave her the £25 first prize in the Brewster-Jones Memorial Prizes for The Singing of the Stars, an unaccompanied choral nocturne. The text was by Barbara Doust. In May 1954 the Victorian Symphony Orchestra gave the first performance of her orchestral miniature Soliloquy in an Empire Day broadcast. She was the only Australian woman composer on the programme. That month her song The Dreamer, which Chappell had published in London, was released in Australia. Later in 1954 her Sonatina for piano took first place in the solo-instrument section of the composition competition run by the Australian Performing Right Association (APRA) and the ABC, which carried a £50 prize.

In 1960 Eagles was among the members of the newly formed Fellowship of Australian Composers. Her later concert works include Lullaby for Anthea for organ (1989). Her Pastorale for piano appears on the CD Six Profiles of Australian Women Composers.

=== Film music ===
Eagles's first film score was for North to the Sun (1951), a ten-minute documentary about settlement and the sugar cane industry in tropical north Queensland. It was directed by John Martin-Jones for the Department of the Interior, with the Australian National Film Board as executive producer. She also wrote the music for Down in the Forest (1953), a short Department of Information film about Australian native animals photographed by Axel Poignant. In 1954 the Sydney Morning Herald reported that the film had won first prize at the Venice film festival, and that Eagles's score used a small orchestra. That year she finished the music for Bush Harvest, another Department of the Interior documentary. She also scored the Department of Information's film about Princess Alexandra.

A 1960 newspaper list of Australian composers who had written music for the Department of the Interior's films included Eagles, Dulcie Holland and Mirrie Hill. In 1961 Navy News reported that Eagles had written the background music for a Movietone documentary on the Royal Australian Navy, recorded by members of the Sydney Symphony Orchestra, and that she had already scored a number of Commonwealth Film Unit productions.

The National Film and Sound Archive credits her as composer or music director on Commonwealth Film Unit films through the 1960s. They include I Name This Ship (1965), about the building, launch and maiden voyage of the Empress of Australia, and The Australian Seaman at War (1969).

== Later life ==
By 1988 Eagles was living in Ringwood North, Victoria. In a letter to The Canberra Times that year, she said that in 1966 she had been one of 12 composers invited to write a new theme for ABC news bulletins, and that the judges chose her entry, but it was never used. Her 2001 National Library interview was recorded in Ringwood. She died in 2003.

== Selected works ==
Concert works

- Theme and Variations – Passacaglia, piano (1948–49)
- The Path of Dreams, part-song (first performed 1950)
- Diversions, piano and orchestra
- The Singing of the Stars, unaccompanied voices (1953)
- Soliloquy, orchestra (first performed 1954)
- The Dreamer, song, words by Dorothea Mackellar (published 1954)
- Sonatina for piano (1954)
- Night's thoughts, music for children's voices (2 parts) and piano, poem by Suzanne Scott-Orr (1969)
- Lullaby for Anthea, organ (1989)

Film scores

- North to the Sun (1951)
- Down in the Forest (1953)
- Bush Harvest (1954)
- I Name This Ship (1965)
- The Australian Seaman at War (1969)
