= Music Australia =

Music Australia may refer to:

- Music Australia, part of Creative Australia, a government body for funding and promoting the arts, established 2023
- Music Australia (online resource), a former standalone online resource on Australian music, now integrated into Trove
- Music Australia : a select list of literature, music scores and sound recordings in print, a journal published by Music Australia, now Australian Music Centre
- Music Council of Australia, a former peak body for music organisations, rebranded as Music Australia in 2014

== See also ==
- Australian Music Association, an industry association for the music products industry in Australia
- Australian Music Centre, a national organisation promoting and supporting art music in Australia
- Music SA, music promotion and advocacy organisation in South Australia
- Sounds Australia, an organisation which assists Australian musicians become established internationally
