= The Holidays =

Australian indie pop/soul band

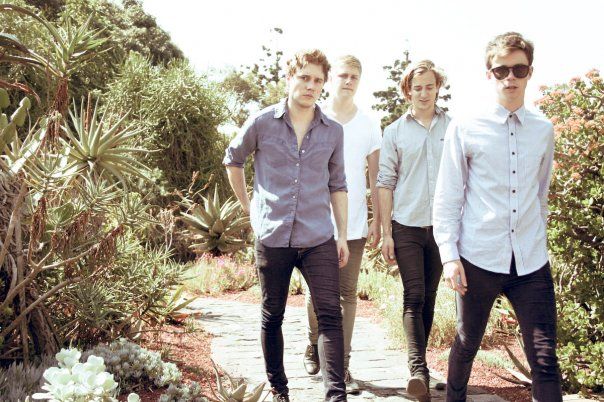
- The Holidays

Background information
- Origin: Sydney, Australia
- Genres: Indie rock, Pop rock, Soul
- Years active: 2006 - present
- Labels: Liberation (Australia), Rallye Label (Japan)
- Members: Simon Jones; Will Magnus; Alex Kortt; Andrew Kerridge
- Website: Official Website

The Holidays are an Australian indie pop/soul band. Formed in Sydney in 2006, the band consists of Will Magnus, Simon Jones, Alex Kortt and Andrew Kerridge. Their debut album Post Paradise was nominated for an Australian Music Prize.

== Biography ==
The Holidays formed in late 2006 and swiftly made a name for themselves in the Sydney music scene with their lively and energetic style. Simon Jones and Will Magnus, who had been high school classmates, previously played together in cover bands during their school's band competitions.

Within their first year as a band together, The Holidays toured with Jamie T, with The View, with Ben Kweller, and recorded an EP of demos which quickly sold out at gigs and received regular airplay on radio stations both in Australia and in the USA. In November 2007 The Holidays were featured on the Next Crop segment of national youth radio station Triple J, soon followed by their signing with independent Australian record label Liberation Music, in early 2008.

The Holidays released their debut EP on 19 April 2008 to positive reviews which was followed by a substantial national tour to promote the release. They released their second EP When The Ship Goes Down in October 2008, which showed the band's natural progression with song-writing. Recorded with Wayne Connolly of The Vines and Josh Pyke fame, this EP was followed by a 20 date national tour, co-headlining with Brisbane band Yves Klein Blue.

The Holidays' debut album Post Paradise soon followed, after several months of writing and experimenting. Drawn away from the simplicity of their earlier indie guitar manifestation, Post Paradise showed the band's development with both the groove and layers of a song, combined with their recognizable pop hooks. This album differed from previous recordings by The Holidays' in that it was self-produced and recorded in various locations around Sydney and New South Wales.

"Moonlight Hours", the first single from their debut album was taken to radio in November 2009, and added to high rotation on national youth radio station Triple J. "Golden Sky" was the second single from The Holidays debut album, released in May 2010, which was followed by an east coast tour of Australia to promote the release. There is a music video for both of these singles, made by Melbourne company Moop Jaw.

Post Paradise was released in Australia on 24 September 2010, in conjunction with the third single, Broken Bones, which was added to radio nationally. The album has received very positive reviews since its release, which included amongst other reviews, being shortlisted for the Australian Music Prize and winning the Red Bull Award for Best Debut Album. Post Paradise also received "Album of the Week" in Drum Media, Beat Magazine, BMA Mag & The Brag, 4.5 stars in The Herald Sun, The Daily Telegraph & The Courier Mail, as well as positive reviews in The Age & The Sydney Morning Herald. Post Paradise won The Age Readers Choice Best Album of 2010, and was the Triple J Feature Album for the week commencing 26 December 2010.

The Holidays toured Post Paradise substantially in 2010 and 2011, including shows at SXSW in Austin, Texas, The Great Escape Festival in Brighton, UK, and Australian festivals including Groovin' the Moo, Laneway Festival and Splendour in the Grass. The Holidays' current live show incorporates a fifth touring member, David Zucker as percussionist, as well occasional backing vocalists.

On 21 February 2014, The Holidays released their second record, Real Feel. Coinciding with the release of the album, the band toured Australia in March and also continued into June/July.

== Members ==
- Will Magnus - Lead Guitar
- Simon Jones - Vocals, Guitar, Keys, Production
- Alex Kortt - Bass guitar
- Andrew Kerridge - Drums, Percussion

== Touring ==
- Toured with Jamie T in May 2007
- Toured with The View in June 2007
- Toured with Ben Kweller in October 2007
- Played nationally at the 2008 St Jerome's Laneway Festival
- Toured with The Wombats in March 2008
- Toured with Lightspeed Champion in July 2008
- Played at Homebake 2008
- Played at Falls Festival 2008
- Toured with Bluejuice in April 2010
- Played at St Jerome's Laneway Festival 2011 across Australia
- Played at SXSW in Austin, Texas in March 2011
- Played at the Groovin' the Moo Festival across Australia in May 2011
- Toured with Cut Copy in Australia in May 2011
- Played at The Great Escape Festival in Brighton, and Dot to Dot Festival across the UK in May 2011
- Played at Splendour in the Grass in August 2011.
- Played at the inaugural Harvest Festival in Melbourne, Sydney & Brisbane in November 2011 along with The Flaming Lips, Portishead and Tv on the Radio.

== Discography ==
=== Albums ===
- Post Paradise (Australia - 24 September 2010, Japan - January 2011)
- Real Feel (21 February 2014)

=== EPs ===
- The Holidays (19 April 2008)
- When The Ship Goes Down (11 October 2008)
- Golden Sky (Australia - May 2010, UK - August 2010)

=== Singles ===
- "Moonlight Hours" (December 2009)
- "Golden Sky" (May 2010)
- "Broken Bones" (September 2010)
- "2 Days" (February 2011)
- "Voices Drifting" (August 2013)
- "All Time High" (November 2013)

== Awards and nominations ==
=== AIR Awards ===
The Australian Independent Record Awards (commonly known informally as AIR Awards) is an annual awards night to recognise, promote and celebrate the success of Australia's Independent Music sector.

| Year | Nominee / work | Award | Result |
|---|---|---|---|
| 2011 | themselves | Breakthrough Independent Artist | Nominated |

=== Australian Music Prize ===
The Australian Music Prize (the AMP) is an annual award of $30,000 given to an Australian band or solo artist in recognition of the merit of an album released during the year of award. The commenced in 2005.

| Year | Nominee / work | Award | Result |
|---|---|---|---|
| 2010 | Post Paradise | Australian Music Prize | Nominated |

=== EG Awards/Music Victoria Awards ===
The Music Victoria Awards (previously known as The Age EG Awards and The Age Music Victoria Awards) are an annual awards night celebrating Victorian music.

| Year | Nominee / work | Award | Result |
|---|---|---|---|
| 2010 | Post Paradise | Best Album | Won |

== Further information ==
- The Holidays song 'Telephone' was featured on an Australian television advertising campaign for Clearasil in late 2007.
- The Holidays song 'Golden Sky' was used in the Channel 7 summer 2010/2011 advertising campaign.
- Simon Jones collaborated & sung vocals with Australian dance duo Bag Raiders on the track 'Not Over' from their eponymous debut album.
