= PPCA =

PPCA may refer to:

- Powering Past Coal Alliance
- Pirate Party of Canada
- Primary peritoneal carcinoma
- Phonographic Performance Company of Australia
