= No Strings Attached (film) =

2011 film by Ivan Reitman

- Theatrical release poster
- Directed by: Ivan Reitman
- Screenplay by: Elizabeth Meriwether
- Story by: Mike Samonek; Elizabeth Meriwether
- Produced by: Jeffrey Clifford; Joe Medjuck; Ivan Reitman
- Starring: Natalie Portman; Ashton Kutcher; Cary Elwes; Kevin Kline
- Cinematography: Rogier Stoffers
- Edited by: Dana E. Glauberman
- Music by: John Debney
- Production companies: Spyglass Entertainment; Cold Spring Pictures; The Montecito Picture Company; Katalyst Films; Handsomecharlie Films
- Distributed by: Paramount Pictures
- Release dates: January 11, 2011 (Westwood, Los Angeles); January 21, 2011 (United States)
- Running time: 108 minutes
- Country: United States
- Language: English
- Budget: $25 million
- Box office: $149 million

No Strings Attached is a 2011 American romantic comedy film directed and co-produced by Ivan Reitman. Starring Natalie Portman and Ashton Kutcher, the film is about two friends who decide to make a pact to have a "no strings attached" relationship, without falling in love with each other. The film premiered in Westwood, Los Angeles on January 11, 2011 and was released by Paramount Pictures in the United States on January 21, 2011, to mixed reviews, with praise for the lead pair's performances and chemistry, but criticism for its direction and screenplay. The film grossed $149 million against a $25 million budget.

== Plot ==
Emma Kurtzman and Adam Franklin first meet as teenagers at a summer camp attended by their families. Over the years, they occasionally cross paths but do not stay in touch. As adults, Emma becomes a doctor in Los Angeles, while Adam works as a production assistant for a musical television series. Adam discovers that his father, Alvin, a former television comedy star, is now dating Adam's ex-girlfriend Vanessa. Upset by the news, Adam gets drunk and contacts several women in his phone. He wakes up the next morning on Emma's couch, where her friends tease him for having cried and passed out naked. Emma helps him find his clothes, and the two end up having sex.

They sleep together again at Adam's home and agree to become friends with benefits. Over time, Adam develops romantic feelings for Emma and becomes jealous of her colleague Sam. Emma, who is uncomfortable with emotional involvement, ends their arrangement. However, she later realizes she misses Adam, and after a night of drinking, goes to his apartment, where they sleep together again.

On Adam's birthday, Alvin announces that he plans to have children with Vanessa. Disturbed by the news, Adam leaves the celebration. Emma supports him, and Adam asks her to go on a real date with him on Valentine's Day. Although the date goes well, Emma reiterates that she is not ready for a serious relationship. Adam, wanting more, decides to end their friendship. Six weeks later, at her sister's wedding rehearsal dinner, Emma realizes she wants to be with Adam. She calls him, but he does not reciprocate. She drives to his apartment and sees him arriving with his co-worker Lucy, whom she assumes is his new girlfriend. Heartbroken, she leaves without speaking to him.

That night, as Adam and Lucy begin to get intimate, Vanessa calls to say that Alvin is in the hospital. Adam rushes to the hospital and sees Vanessa waiting outside. She tells him she does not want to have Alvin's children and that she does not like old people. Adam sees his father and leaves. Outside the ER entrance, he finds Emma driving up, having been informed by a colleague. Emma confesses her feelings, and Adam asks her to try having a real relationship, to which she agrees. They attend Emma's sister's wedding together. Alvin recovers and begins dating Lucy, while Adam and Emma begin a committed romantic relationship.

== Cast ==
- Natalie Portman as Dr. Emma K. Kurtzman
  - Stefanie Scott as young Emma
- Ashton Kutcher as Adam Franklin
  - Dylan Hayes as young Adam
- Kevin Kline as Alvin Franklin, Adam's father
- Cary Elwes as Dr. Steven Metzner, Emma's boss
- Greta Gerwig as Dr. Patrice, Emma's friend
- Lake Bell as Lucy, Adam's colleague from the TV production
- Olivia Thirlby as Katie Kurtzman, Emma's younger 22-year-old sister
- Ludacris as Wallace, Adam's friend
- Jake Johnson as Eli, Adam's friend
- Mindy Kaling as Dr. Shira, Emma's friend
- Talia Balsam as Sandra Kurtzman, Emma and Katie's mother
- Ophelia Lovibond as Vanessa, Alvin's girlfriend and Adam's ex-girlfriend
- Guy Branum as Dr. Guy, Emma's homosexual friend
- Ben Lawson as Dr. Sam, a co-worker of Emma who likes her
- Jennifer Irwin as Megan, Adam's boss
- Nasim Pedrad as a writer
- Adhir Kalyan as Kevin, Katie's fiancé
- Abby Elliott as Joy
- Matthew Moy as Chuck
- Brian H. Dierker as "Bones", Sandra's boyfriend
- Mollee Gray as Sari
- Vedette Lim as Lisa

In addition, Ivan Reitman makes a cameo as a musical television show director.

== Production ==
No Strings Attached is directed by Ivan Reitman based on a screenplay by Elizabeth Meriwether titled Friends with Benefits. The title was changed to avoid confusion with a different film with a similar premise that opened on July 22, 2011. The Paramount Pictures film was first announced in March 2010 as an untitled project. Actors Ashton Kutcher and Natalie Portman were cast in the lead roles, and Paramount anticipated a release date of January 7, 2011. Reitman said of casual sex, "I noticed from my own kids that with this generation in particular, young people find it easier to have a sexual relationship than an emotional one. That is how the sexes deal with each other today." Principal photography began in May 2010. By November 2010, the film was titled No Strings Attached with a new release date of January 21, 2011.

Though the timing was coincidental, Portman welcomed the chance to portray a dissimilar character to her role in Black Swan.

== Soundtrack ==
No Strings Attached: Music from the Motion Picture

Soundtrack album by Various Artists
- Released: February 15, 2011
- Genre: Film soundtrack
- Label: Lakeshore Records

No Strings Attached: Music from the Motion Picture is the soundtrack to the film. It was released on February 15, 2011, by Lakeshore Records.

No.	Title	Artist	Length
1.	"I Wanna Sex You Up"	Color Me Badd	4:07
2.	"What Good Is a Boy"	Lanchen	1:48
3.	"Click, Click, Click, Click"	Bishop Allen	3:07
4.	"Bang Bang Bang"	Mark Ronson & The Business Intl.	4:06
5.	"99 Problems"	Hugo	2:17
6.	"Bossa Nova Baby (Viva Elvis)"	Elvis Presley	3:06
7.	"Bleeding Love"	Leona Lewis	4:24
8.	"Untitled (How Does It Feel)"	D'Angelo	7:08
9.	"I Will Let You Go"	Daniel Ahearn	4:24
10.	"It Was You"	Robbie Nevil	3:29
11.	"Rock It"	Little Red	3:29
12.	"Love Lost"	The Temper Trap	3:35
13.	"Rhythm of Love"	Plain White T's	3:20

== Release ==
No Strings Attached had its world premiere on January 11, 2011, at the Fox Village Theater in Los Angeles, California. The film was released in 3,018 theaters in the United States and Canada on January 21, 2011. Its target demographic was women between 17 and 24 years old, and its primary competition was The Dilemma. Interest tracking reflected the target demographic's gaining interest in the film leading up to its release, and tracking also revealed "good early awareness" from Hispanic audiences. The studio predicted for the film to gross in the "mid-to-high teens" millions in its opening weekend, similar to past romantic comedies rated "R" (restricted to 17 years old and up) by the Motion Picture Association of America. With No Strings Attached as the only wide opener in the United States and Canada, it was uncertain if it would rank first at the box office above The Green Hornet, which opened the previous weekend in first place with $33.5 million.

=== Box office ===
Ultimately, No Strings Attached beat The Green Hornet with an opening weekend gross of $20.3 million. 70% of the audience were women. According to CinemaScore, audiences under the age of 25 gave the film an "A−" grade while audiences over the age of 25 gave it a "B" grade. Future grosses were expected to be dependent on the younger demographic.

The film grossed $70.7 million in the United States and Canada and $78.5 million in other territories for a worldwide total of $149.2 million.

=== Critical reception ===
No Strings Attached received mixed reviews. Review aggregator Rotten Tomatoes gives the film a rating of 47%, based on 173 reviews, with an average rating of 5.30/10. The site's consensus reads: "It benefits from the presence of Natalie Portman and director Ivan Reitman's steady hand, but No Strings Attached doesn't have the courage or conviction to follow through on its ribald premise." On Metacritic, the film received a score of 50 out of 100, based on 36 reviews, indicating "mixed or average reviews".

Critic David Edelstein described No Strings Attached as a film with "a supposedly feminist veneer...(that) never makes the case for Emma's point of view. It's almost a feminist backlash movie, and it didn't have to be. There are plenty of reasons for brilliant young women, especially with the stress of a medical career, to approach time- and emotion-consuming relationships warily." He expressed disappointment on overuse of stock characters, as well as Reitman's "heavy-handed" direction and a story that is ultimately "corny and contrived and conservative." A. O. Scott called the film "not entirely terrible...high praise indeed, given that this is a film aspiring to match the achievement of 27 Dresses, When in Rome, and Leap Year"; according to Scott, the film is "Love & Other Drugs without the disease", a film whose pleasures "are to be found in the brisk, easy humor of some of Ms. Meriwether's dialogue and in the talented people scattered around Ms. Portman and Mr. Kutcher like fresh herbs strewn on a serving of overcooked fish." Scott considered "the film's great squandered opportunity—and also the source of some of its best comic moments—is that Ms. Gerwig and Mindy Kaling in effect share the role of Emma’s zany sidekick. How can this be? Why are these two entirely original and of-the-moment performers marginal players in this agreeable, lackluster picture and not stars of the year’s greatest girl-bromance?... To imagine Ms. Kaling and Ms. Gerwig in a remake of Thelma and Louise or the Wedding Crashers is to experience an equal measure of frustration and hope. Why can’t we have a few movies like that and not quite so many like this?"

British newspaper The Telegraph named No Strings Attached one of the ten worst films of 2011, saying "No Strings Attached is nominally a raunchy romantic comedy, but Portman betrays so little indication of enjoying herself you’d be forgiven for thinking we were watching deleted scenes from Black Swan."

=== Home media ===
No Strings Attached was released on DVD and Blu-ray on May 10, 2011.

== See also ==
- Friends with Benefits
- When Harry Met Sally
- Befikre
