= Richard Letts =

Richard Albert Letts AM is a music advocate and administrator.

== Life and work ==
Richard Letts trained as a classical pianist and composer and worked as a jazz band leader in his early years. In 1964 he moved to the University of California (Berkeley), where he completed his PhD in 1971. In 1972 he built and became the director of the East Bay Center for Performing Arts, a community performing arts school in a ghetto on San Francisco’s East Bay. In 1980 he became director of the MacPhail Center for the Arts, the downtown music school of the University of Minnesota in Minneapolis and in 1981 was elected vice-president of the National Guild of Community Schools of the Arts.

In 1982 Letts returned to Australia as director of the music board of the Australia Council, where he initiated major developments in policy that "had a profound influence in reshaping the pattern of government support for music in Australia" (Bebbington 1997). He became director of the Australian Music Centre in 1987, and introduced programs in digitisation, record production, publishing, retailing, the awards program and others.

In 1994, he founded and was inaugural executive director of the Music Council of Australia.

In 2005, he was elected president of the International Music Council, based in UNESCO in Paris. He was responsible for some major innovations in its program, including the establishment of an international music sector development program, the weekly e-bulletin Music World News, and the initiation of the IMC Musical Rights Awards.

== Recognition and awards ==
- 1996: Member of the Order of Australia (AM) under the Australian honours system, for services to music.

=== APRA Awards ===
The APRA Awards are held in Australia and New Zealand by the Australasian Performing Right Association to recognise songwriting skills, sales and airplay performance by its members annually.

Year	Nominee / work	Award	Result	Ref.
2008	Richard Letts	Long-Term Contribution to the Advancement of Australian Music	Won	

=== Bernard Heinze Memorial Award ===
The Sir Bernard Heinze Memorial Award is given to a person who has made an outstanding contribution to music in Australia.

Year	Nominee / work	Award	Result
2020	Richard Letts	Sir Bernard Heinze Memorial Award	awarded

== Selected writings ==
All monographs are available for loan from the Australian Music Centre.

- Creative musicianship and psychological growth : bases in some theories of personality, creativity, instruction, aesthetics and music, for a music curriculum for the late twentieth century. Thesis (Ph.D. (Educ.)) - University of California, Berkeley, 1971.
- Music board medium range plan. Sydney: Australia Council, 1985.
- The Arts on the Edge of Chaos. Report commissioned by the Australia Council, 1995. Unpublished.
- Opportunities for Australian musical works in North Asia, 1988.
- Your career as a composer Sydney: Allen & Unwin. Australia Council, 1994.
- The ART of Self Promotion : Successful Promotion by Musicians. Commissioned by the Australia Council. Sydney: Allen and Unwin, 1996.
- The Effects of Globalisation on Music in Five Contrasting Countries: Australia, Germany, Nigeria, The Philippines and Uruguay. Global research project commissioned by the International Music Council, 2003.
- A statistical framework for the music sector : for the Statistics Working Group of the Cultural Ministers Council / a scoping study with Hans-Hoegh Guldberg. Canberra : Department of Communications, Information Technology and the Arts, 2004.
- The Protection and Promotion of Musical Diversity, 2006. Global research project carried out by the International Music Council, commissioned by UNESCO. With consultants from Europe, Latin America, Africa, Arab World, Asia.
- Sound Links: Exploring the Dynamics of Musical Communities in Australia, and Their Potential for Informing Collaboration with Music in Schools, 2009. Research partnership of Music Council of Australia with the Queensland Conservatorium Research Centre, funded by the Australian Research Council. With Brydie Leigh-Bartleet, Peter Dunbar-Hall, Huib Schippers May 2009.
