= Time Off =

Australian music magazine

- Logo
- Editor: N/A
- Categories: Arts
- Frequency: Weekly
- Circulation: 76,000
- Publisher: Time Off Publications
- Founded: 1976
- Final issue: August 2013
- Country: Australia
- Based in: Brisbane
- Language: English
- Website: [www.timeoff.com.au Official Website]

Time Off was a free weekly tabloid-sized music magazine (street press) that was originally distributed in Brisbane, Queensland, Australia. The magazine began on campus in 1976 at the University of Queensland as an initiative of co-editors Rob Cameron and Bruce Dickson, and was originally printed on A4 glossy stock. While then circulated free on campus, it was simultaneously released for limited edition purchase through South-East Queensland newsagents. Commenting on its status as a pioneering cultural production of its type for Australia, Phillip Adams at the time described it as "a remarkable achievement" (for quality, independent publishing).

In the early 80s, Time Off began distribution off-campus as a now free, newsprint edition. With a strong rock music bias, the magazine also focuses on cinema and the arts, and now has a separate dance music section.

The magazine was edited/published for the bulk of its history by Sean Sennett who bought the magazine while it was in receivership in 1990 and successfully grew the paper over the ensuing period. For nearly twenty years Sennett oversaw the magazine taking it from 16pp to up to 72pp adding a glossy cover and expanding the magazine's print run and content. During this period Sennett interviewed over 1000 artists and gave many local writers the opportunity to have their work published. Sennett also instigated the 'Core Sample' series which saw local bands featured on various compilation CDs. Sennett has now established Time Off Media; the aim of which is to take the 'indie spirit' of Time Off into the digital age with Tom Magazine. Under Sennett's guidance Time Off were the second street paper to go online in Australia [behind Beat Magazine] in the early 1990s.

Earlier editors included Shar Adams, Gavin Sawford and Brent Hampstead who shaped the paper from a 'what's on' guide to a more music themed publication.

In April 2008 Time Off was sold to the Melbourne-based publisher Street Press Australia, who published Inpress. Steve Bell became editor. Sean Sennett set up a new online company Time Off Media.

In August 2013 Time Off was merged with two other magazines, Drum Media and Inpress, owned by Street Press and was renamed as The Music.

Sean Sennett announced in 2021 he had purchased Time Off back from Handshake Media and planned to revive the title.

In November 2025, the Time Off website went live - the site contains a mix of new stories with classic stories from the Time Off archive.
