= When the Ship Goes Down =

When The Ship Goes Down

EP by The Holidays
- Released: 11 October 2008
- Recorded: August 2008
- Genre: Indie rock, Pop rock
- Label: Liberation Music
- Producer: Wayne Connolly, the Holidays

The Holidays chronology
The Holidays EP (2008)	When The Ship Goes Down (2008)	Moonlight Hours (2010)

When The Ship Goes Down is the second official extended play by the Australian indie band, the Holidays. It was released on 11 October 2008, less than 6 months after the release of their debut, The Holidays EP. Recorded with Wayne Connolly producing, When the Ship Goes Down is a concept EP, "about the decline of relationships and the thrill when one catches you by surprise".

The lead single off this EP, "Mexico", had a music video made for it. It received regular airplay on national youth radio station Triple J.

== Track listing ==
1. "When the Ship Goes Down"
2. "Mexico"
3. "Take Your Own Advice"
4. "All The Girls"
5. "The Comeback"
