= Australian Musician =

Australian music magazine and website

- Editor: Greg Phillips
- Former editors: Rob Walker; Clare Bowditch
- Categories: Music; entertainment
- Founder: Alex Bolt
- Founded: 1995; 31 years ago
- First issue: December 1995; 30 years ago
- Final issue: October 2012; 13 years ago
- Company: Mediaville
- Country: Australia
- Language: English
- Website: australianmusician.com.au

Australian Musician is an online music magazine based in Australia established in 1995.

It was formerly published as a free quarterly print magazine from its inception until its disestablishment in 2012, before being re-launched as an online magazine in 2014.

== History ==
Australian Musician (Note: Not to be confused with the magazine of the same name published in Adelaide, South Australia from 1917 to 1918, full title The Australian Musician: A Monthly Newspaper for Bands.) was launched by the Australian Music Association in December 1995 as a quarterly, colour publication. It was initiated by AMA executive committee member Alex Bolt, and executive officer Rob Walker became managing editor, a role he retained until Greg Phillips took over in 2001.

The aim of the magazine was "to inform, educate and entertain local musicians of all levels", and the print version was available for free at musical instrument retailers. It has included interviews with musicians such as Tommy Emmanuel, INXS, Kate Ceberano, Wolfmother, Little Birdy, Paul Dempsey, and Dave Graney. In December 2007, an all-female edition was produced by guest editor Clare Bowditch, with every single article was about female artists and every item in the magazine was written by women. Australian Musician also specialised in covering bands' soundchecks, with rare editorial and photographic access to acts during rehearsals. Artists that have allowed the magazine access include the Rolling Stones, Joe Satriani, the Thrills, Roger Waters', and Sepultura.

It was available free from musical instrument retailers nationally in Australia, similar to other music street press.

Its publication was outsourced from late 2011 until its final publication in print in October 2012. It was, until then, Australia's longest continuously running magazine for musicians.

In March 2014 Australian Musician was relaunched as an online publication, with similar stated aims, including "artist exposure and information on, and promotion of, the tools that musicians use to create their art".

== Today ==
In July 2023, editor Greg Phillips acquired the magazine, trading under the name Mediaville.

The website is archived in the Pandora archive by the National Library of Australia, and the magazine also runs a YouTube channel and has a presence on Facebook, Instagram, and X.

== See also ==
- List of Australian magazines
- List of music magazines
- Music magazines published in Australia
- Music street press of Australia
- Music of Australia
- Culture of Australia
