= The Alternative Gig Guide =

Former free Australian music magazine

TAGG – The Alternative Gig Guide
- Editor: Mick Pacholli
- Editor: Stuart Coupe (Sydney)
- Categories: Music
- Frequency: Fortnightly
- Publisher: Mick Pacholli
- First issue: 14 June 1979
- Final issue: 1981
- Based in: Melbourne, Victoria
- Language: English

TAGG – The Alternative Gig Guide or TAGG (its acronym and popular name) was a free fortnightly Australian music street press published from 1979 to 1981 in Melbourne. It was published by Toorak Times, an independent newspaper started in 1972, and later expanded to Sydney.

== History ==
TAGG was founded in 1979 by Helmut Katterl and Mick Pacholli, and the first issue arrived Thursday 14 June 1979, with 500 copies printed.

Each issue featured interviews, reviews, and charts alongside the gig guide, and readers could subscribe annually for $10. Early issues featured between 50 and 60 pages, but later issues expanded to close to 100 before its closure.

Mick Pacholli would later write, "It was a time when discos were taking over every major pub which had been the main stages for live music around Australia and it was very difficult to find out when and if bands were playing...I had been producing pocket sized tourist guides called 'The Visitor's Guide to Melbourne and Surrounding Areas' with my father and had also seen a need for music fans to find out where and what was happening."

TAGG was Australia's earliest street press newspapers, and predated Beat Magazine and Inpress by several year, who both began publishing in Melbourne during the 1980s. After circulating in Melbourne, TAGG's pocket-sized gig guide expanded to Sydney where it was edited by Stuart Coupe.

The Melbourne edition had several editors, starting with Helmut Katterl until issue #9, then Al Webb from #11-23, publisher Mick Pacholli from #28, Al Waymann from #37, and Steve Lane from #45. But not every issue of TAGG listed an editor for the Melbourne edition.

The initial editions of TAGG and The Toorak Times closed in the 1980s, but TAGG was reborn in 2015 as an 8-page printed edition and online publication. The online edition remains available, and pulls event data from Facebook to keep itself up to date.
