= EG Awards of 2010 =

Annual Australian music awards ceremony

- Date: 15 December 2010
- Venue: Prince of Wales, Melbourne, Victoria
- Hosted by: Brian Nankervis

Highlights
- Most wins: Gotye (3)

The EG Awards of 2010 are the fifth Annual The Age EG (Entertainment Guide) Awards and took place at the Prince of Wales on 15 December 2010. The event was hosted by Brian Nankervis.

== Hall of Fame inductees ==
Paul Kelly

== Life Time Achievement Awards ==
Patrick Donovan

== Performers ==
- Dan Kelly
- Eagle and the Worm
- Lemonheads
- Megan Washington
- Paul Kelly
- Tim Rogers
- The Drones

== Award nominees and winners ==
Winners indicated below in boldface

Best Album	Best Song
**The Holidays - Post Paradise**	**Little Red - "Rock It"'**
Best Male	Best Female
**Dan Kelly**	**Jess Harlen**
Best Band	Best New Talent
**Bliss n Eso**	**Love Connection**
