= BMA Magazine =

Australian magazine

- Type: Street press
- Owner(s): Scott Layne and Allan Sko
- Publisher: Radar Media
- Founded: 1992; 34 years ago
- Language: English
- Headquarters: Canberra, ACT, Australia
- Circulation: 10,000 print, 10,000 download
- Price: Free
- Website: www.bmamag.com

BMA Magazine is an Australia street press and music magazine focusing on popular music, concerts, live events and popular culture in Canberra and surrounding areas. It is published fortnightly.

== Profile ==
BMA is an initialism for Bands Music Action. It is available free to readers in both print format and as a web download. The magazine estimates print readership to be around 35,000 and generates around 10,000 downloads per issue. The content includes a cover story, regular columns, interviews, band profile, a comprehensive gig guide of forthcoming tours or events in and around Canberra, reviews of singles, albums, live events, theatre and films. The magazine has a full colour layout, whereas initially it was printed black and white. At the moment, it is the only music magazine local to Canberra. BMA's cover stories have included features on Sonic Youth, Midnight Juggernaughts, Silverchair and Powderfinger, Steely Dan, John Butler, INXS, Stonefest, Trackside, Hilltop Hoods, Clare Bowditch, Deep Purple, The Presidents of the United States of America, Wolfmother, Grinspoon, Grandmaster Flash, Chemical Brothers, Cypress Hill and James Blunt.

== History ==
The magazine was founded in 1992 by Lisa Howdin and Peter Spicer. The first edition of BMA came out in February 1992, it was tabloid in size and the cover featured Tex Perkins, and included coverage of the Nirvana Nevermind tour. A small office (3m x 3m) was established upstairs at Gorman House, where often both editors and contributors worked simultaneously.

A full set of the magazine can be found at the Canberra Library and at the National Library of Australia.

In 2013, BMA Magazine opened a curated exhibition, Canberra at Street Level, to mark its 21st anniversary.

Notably, for the first time in the magazine's 26-year history, an issue was not published in March 2018.
