= Rip It Up (Adelaide) =

Defunct Australian magazine and website

Rip It Up Magazine
- Rip It Up logo
- Digital Manager: Jess Bayly
- Former editors: Scott McLennan, Walter Marsh, Robert Dunstan
- Photographer: Andre Castelluci, Andreas Heuer, Kristy DeLaine
- Categories: Music magazine
- Frequency: Weekly
- Publisher: Rip It Up Publishing
- Founded: 1989
- Final issue: 17 April 2014 (print); 30 June 2016 (website)
- Country: Australia
- Based in: Adelaide
- Language: English

Rip It Up was an Adelaide-based online music, entertainment, and culture publication, first in print and then online, between 1989 and 2016. The magazine and website focused on the local entertainment scene of Adelaide, South Australia, including news and reviews of music (gigs, albums), food and drink (bars, food trucks, restaurants), and local arts, along with interviews and other features. It was the longest-running music and entertainment publication in South Australia.

== History ==
Issue 1 of Rip It Up was published for the week 8–15 February 1989. It was a weekly street press magazine in Adelaide, focusing on local entertainment, music and culture. The magazine provided a comprehensive gig and events guide, strong local arts focus, live gigs and album reviews, interviews with local and international artists, regular columns, food news and reviews including bars and restaurants, food trucks, openings and more. Issues were released each Thursday. The publication moved to a digital-only platform in 2014.

The website ceased operations altogether on 30 June 2016, making it the longest-running music and entertainment publication in South Australia. The editor at the time, Walter Marsh, said that although the readership had grown, there was not enough advertising revenue to keep it going. Owner Opinion Media continued to publish The Adelaide Review and Clique Mag.

== People ==
Margie Budich was owner and executive director of Rip It Up, from its launch until She also owned Attitude, and Onion.

Robert "Bertie" Dunstan (c. 1955–2023) worked for Telstra before he gave up a secure job to follow his passion as a music journalist. He worked at Rip It Up for over 20 years, with 12 of those as editor. After the magazine went online, he started another entertainment publication in print, BSide Magazine, which in 2023 is a fortnightly online magazine. Dunstan won the Fowler's Live Achievement Award in the 2015 SA Music Awards, in recognition "his sustained contribution to the local music industry", and in 2017 he won the Ryan Freeman Live Music Award at the 2017 SA Music Awards. He was also inducted into the AMC SA Music Hall of Fame. He also wrote a monthly column, called "At The Bar With Bertie" for magazine The Note from its third issue, in March 2023. He was a very well-known champion of local music and music journalist. The Gov built a special bar in his honour, which they named the "Robert Dunstan Bar". The day after attending a gig at The Gov, Dunstan died at his home in Moana on 20 August 2023. His death was marked by several obituaries in the local press, with music venues and musicians also paying homage to the man of "legendary status". Andrew Street of Scenestr wrote that "when the ecosystem that supported street press died off and took Adelaide's street press with it, Rob kept the faith. He poured that vast and encyclopaedic knowledge into BSide Magazine, a defiant refusal to let the recording and promoting of Adelaide’s creative culture evaporate into social media ephemera".

Scott McLennan began work as a freelance music journalist on Rip It Up in 2002, after resigning from the Australian Federal Police. He worked full time in this capacity and then as editor at the magazine for around 10 years.

Walter Marsh was online editor at the time of the magazine's demise. He later wrote for The Adelaide Review, and in 2023 published a book about media mogul Rupert Murdoch, called Young Rupert: The Making of the Murdoch Empire, which has been praised for the high quality of its research.

== Awards ==
=== Fowler's Live Music Awards ===
The Fowler's Live Music Awards took place from 2012 to 2014 to "recognise success and achievement over the past 12 months [and] celebrate the great diversity of original live music" in South Australia. Since 2015 they're known as the South Australian Music Awards.

| Year | Nominee / work | Award | Result (wins only) |
|---|---|---|---|
| 2013 | Rip It Up | Favourite SA Music Media Source | Won |
| 2014 | Rip It Up | Favourite SA Music Media Source | Won |

== See also ==
- CityMag
