= Samuel Wagan Watson =

Contemporary Indigenous Australian poet

- Born: Brisbane, Queensland, Australia
- Occupation: Poet
- Parent: Sam Watson (father)

Samuel Wagan Watson is a contemporary Indigenous Australian poet.

== Early life and education ==
Samuel Wagan Watson was born in Brisbane and is of Aboriginal (Munanjali and Birri Gubba), Irish, German, and Dutch descent. His father is novelist and political activist Sam Watson (1952–2019).

He grew up in the Mt Gravatt area of Brisbane, and as a child frequently accompanied his parents to protests. He enjoyed rock music, particularly Janis Joplin and the Doobie Brothers, and aspired to be a rock musician.

Watson lived in the Sunshine Coast area for a while, and early jobs included as salesman, film technician, and law clerk for the 1987 Royal Commission into Aboriginal Deaths in Custody. Watson moved back to Brisbane when he started writing as a career.

== Writing career ==
Watson wrote short stories, but changed focus to poetry, inspired by one of several companies that reject his drafts noting that his writing contained good poetic elements. His first poems were in sonnet form, later changing to free verse style. The themes of his poetry range from observations of everyday experience, to the effects of colonisation.

In the late 1990s, Watson was invited to participate in a Brisbane City Council project to raise awareness of the Boondall Wetlands, alongside fellow poets Brett Dionysius and Liz Hall-Downs. The project was set up to bring together historians, poets, photographers, environmentalists and designers and show the cultural history of the Wetlands, both the local Indigenous history and the experiences of European settlers. In 2000 an audio CD was produced of the three poets' work, called Blackfellas Whitefellas Wetlands. The very different voices and focus of the poets worked together to create a sense or place and of history.

His 2004 poetry collection Smoke Encrypted Whispers was set to music by 23 Brisbane-based composers, who each wrote a two-minute piece to respond to a particular poem. The project was commissioned by the clarinettist Paul Dean, who conducted a recording of the work featuring soprano Margaret Schindler and the Southern Cross Soloists, with Ron Haddrick narrating. One of the pieces, entitled "Die dunkle erde", was devised with composers Stephen Leek and William Barton, with Barton playing didgeridoo. The piece blended German Gothic horror and Aboriginal culture, and was performed by Watson and Barton on The Music Show.

He performed as a singer for the first time in 2007, with Leah Flanagan, at the Newcastle National Young Writers Festival in Newcastle. In 2008, he appeared at the Sydney Writers' Festival.

The Japanese Aeronautical Exploration Agency commissioned Watson to write some haiku to keep Japanese astronauts amused on the International Space Station.

Watson has worked as a writer and script developer for 98.9FM Murri Country radio station in Brisbane. He also works on various community projects, is often invited as a guest speaker, and facilitates workshops and mentors young writers and other creative artists.

=== Festivals ===
Watson has appeared at numerous literary festivals, including:

- 2004: Brisbane Writers Festival
- 2014: Brisbane Writers Festival
- 2015: Adelaide Writers' Week
- 2015: International Poetry Festival of Medellín, Colombia (where he represented Australia)

=== Residencies ===
In 2005, Watson was the poet-in-residence for Sunday Arts on ABC TV.

In 2007 he was appointed artist-in-residence for the Utan Kayu Literary Biennale in Indonesia, which included translations of his work being presented to audiences in Jakarta and central Java.

He has also been a poet-in-residence in Yarrabah community in North Queensland.

== Influences ==
Watson recognises the influence of his parents in his work, and also cited Nick Cave, Tom Waits, Jack Kerouac, Charles Bukowski and Robert Adamson as influences.

== Recognition and awards ==
The Eleanor Schonell Bridge in St Lucia, Brisbane, has some of Watson's poetry as decoration. It is embedded into the paving footpath as well as embossed on the railing, along with that of another Brisbane-born poet, Luke Beesley.

Awards and nominations include:

- 1999: Queensland Premier's Literary Awards, David Unaipon Award for an Emerging Indigenous Writers for Of Muse, Meandering and Midnight
- 2005: New South Wales Premier's Literary Awards, Kenneth Slessor Prize for Poetry Book of the Year for Smoke Encrypted Whispers
- 2018: Patrick White Literary Award

== Personal life ==
Watson's aunt was poet and family violence campaigner Maureen Watson.

Watson suffered a brain haemorrhage, that made it difficult to give readings, but two years later he had recovered enough to resume.

== Selected works ==
=== Books ===
- Of Muse, Meandering and Midnight. (UQP, 1999) ISBN 0-7022-3174-6
- Itinerant Blues. (UQP, 2002) ISBN 0-7022-3282-3
- Hotel Bone (Vagabone Press, 2001)
- Smoke Encrypted Whispers. (UQP, 2004) ISBN 0-7022-3471-0
- Three legged dogs, and other poems. (Picaro Press, 2005) OCLC: 69249268

=== Articles and other publications ===
- "Cold Storage". The Literary Review. 45 (1): 108. 2001. ISSN 0024-4589. Archived from the original on 9 December 2004.
- "Hotel Bone". Jacket Magazine. Jacket 16. March 2002.
- "Recipe for metropolis Brisbane". Southerly. 62 (2): 43–44. January 2002.
- "Boondall Wetlands, ... falling mother sky: A Collection of Poetry". Brisbane City Council, Brisbane Stories. 1996. Archived from the original on 30 May 2004.

=== Other media ===
- Watson, Samuel Wagan; Brett Dionysius; Liz Hall-Downs (2000). "Blackfellas Whitefellas Wetlands". CD. unknown.
