= Music Council of Australia =

The Music Council of Australia (MCA) founded in 1994 and rebranded Music Australia in 2014, was a national peak music organisation for Australia. It disbanded in 2020, but continues to exist as a charitable entity as Music Council of Australia.

== History ==
The inaugural founder and executive director of the Music Council of Australia from 1994 was Richard Letts, representing 50 organisations at that time.

The Music Council of Australia was rebranded "Music Australia" in 2014.

The Music Council of Australia / Music Australia had four CEOs in its 25-year history: Richard Letts (1994-2012), Chris Bowen (2013-2018), Rhonda Davidson-Irwin (2018-19), and Paul Saintilan (2019-2020).

Although Music Australia stopped operating in 2020, the company continues to exist as a charitable entity for a different purpose, by agreement with the board, as Music Council of Australia.

== Governance and functions ==
Music Australia was the national peak music organisation for Australia. Its governing body was a council, whose members represented industry bodies, including the Australian Music Association (AMA) as well as individuals. It partnered with the AMA in various initiatives through the 2000s and 2010s, such as "Music Play For Life" and "Music Count Us In".

The council conducted research, gathered and disseminated information, and advocated on issues in the musical life of Australia it considered important. Its website stated in 2014 that it was "the only body in Australia devoted to music in its entirety... a passionate advocate, a sector focused researcher, a comprehensive information portal, a broker, and a provider of informed and relevant services. Our activities span music education, industry and community sectors to deliver campaigns, information, resources, engagement, and participation and demonstration projects".

It was the official Australian representative to the UNESCO world peak music organisation, the International Music Council, Paris, and was also a member of the International Network for Cultural Diversity in Ottawa, Canada.

== See also ==
- Music Australia (disambiguation)
