= Midnight Remember =

Studio album by Little Red
- Released: 10 September 2010
- Genres: Pop; rock
- Length: 45:23
- Label: Liberation Music

Little Red chronology
Listen to Little Red (2008)	Midnight Remember (2010)

Singles from Midnight Remember
- 1. "Rock It" Released: 4 June 2010; 2. "Slow Motion" Released: 10 September 2010; 3. "All Mine" Released: 3 March 2011

Professional ratings
Review scores
Source	Rating
The Age	3/5 stars
AllMusic	3.5/5 stars
The Brag	3.5/5 stars
Ultimate Guitar	7.7/10

Midnight Remember is the second and final studio album by Australian rock band Little Red, released in Australia and New Zealand through Liberation Music on 10 September 2010. Midnight Remember debuted and peaked at number 5 on the Australian album charts and remained in the charts for 12 weeks where it was certified Gold, mostly due to the success of the highly successful single "Rock It", which was accredited with Platinum status.

The album produced three singles. The most successful, "Rock It", reached number 19 on the ARIA Singles Chart and was voted into second place in the Triple J Hottest 100 for 2010.

== Production ==
Midnight Remember was produced by Scott Horscroft, who had worked on albums previously for bands such as The Presets and The Panics. The recording sessions for the album took place at The Grove Studios located on the Central Coast, while final mixing occurred at Big Jesus Burger Studios in Sydney.

Production on the album began in April 2010, after three years of experimentation:

"Three years ago we were experimenting with more dance-like grooves but we weren't good enough musicians to pull it off. It wasn't until we had Scott producing that we nailed it."

— Tom Hartney

The band considered Midnight Remember to be "difficult" to record, considering the success of the debut album Listen to Little Red.

== Track listing ==
No.	Title	Length
1.	"Get a Life"	4:22
2.	"Slow Motion"	3:33
3.	"Forget About Your Man"	2:59
4.	"Rock It"	3:28
5.	"All Mine"	2:54
6.	"I Can't Wait"	3:33
7.	"Place Called Love"	3:33
8.	"Lazy Boy"	2:49
9.	"Little Bit of Something"	3:14
10.	"In My Bed"	2:41
11.	"Follow You There"	3:46
12.	"Going Wrong"	4:19
13.	"Chelsworth"	4:10

iTunes bonus tracks
No.	Title	Length
14.	"Darkest Night"	3:58
15.	"February"	2:58

== Charts ==
Chart (2010)	Peak position
Australian Albums (ARIA)	5

== Certifications ==
Region	Certification	Certified units/sales
Australia (ARIA)	Gold	35,000^{^}
^{^} Shipments figures based on certification alone.
