= Leah Flanagan =

Australian singer-songwriter

- Leah Flanagan performing live 2015

Background information
- Occupation: Singer-songwriter
- Instruments: Vocals, guitar

Leah Flanagan is an Australian singer-songwriter and arts administrator from Darwin, Northern Territory, now based in Sydney. She has released several albums and has toured Australia with her music and as a part of festival ensembles.

== Early life and education ==
Flanagan identifies as Indigenous Australian due to her Aboriginal (Alyawarre) heritage.

She studied classical music at the Elder Conservatorium of Music in Adelaide.

== Music career ==
Flanagan has released several albums and has toured Australia with her music and as a part of festival ensembles. She has collaborated with Sinéad O'Connor, Meshell Ndegeocello, poet Sam Wagan Watson, The Black Arm Band, Paul Kelly and Ursula Yovich, and recorded a duet with Marlon Williams of Archie Roach's "I've Lied".

From 2009 to 2011, Flanagan performed in the productions Murundak, Hidden Republic, and Dirtsong with the touring company The Black Arm Band at many major festivals across Australia. Her performances in this period included one at the 2010 Vancouver Winter Olympics.

In 2010 she appeared at the Melbourne International Arts Festival's production Seven Songs To Leave Behind with John Cale, Rickie Lee Jones, Snead O'Connor, Meshell Ndegeocello, and Gurrumul with Black Arm Band members Ursula Yovich, Dan Sultan, and Shellie Morris.

Flanagan was invited by Deborah Conway to be part of her Song Trails project for the 2009 and 2011 Queensland Music Festivals, which led to her collaborating with Australian artists Peter Farnan (Boom Crash Opera), Robert Forster (The Go-Betweens) and Rebecca Barnard (Rebecca's Empire) to deliver a series of workshops and to perform concerts across regional Queensland.

Flanagan composed a show entitled Midnight Muses, based on the work of Brisbane poet Samuel Wagan Watson, for the Adelaide Cabaret Festival in 2011. It later appeared at the 2013 Sydney Festival.

Flanagan in 2012

She was invited to perform as a featured soloist in the first Australian production of Leonard Bernstein's MASS at the 2012 Adelaide Festival.

In late 2015 Flanagan was invited by Archie Roach to record a duet of his song "I've Lied" with Marlon Williams for the 25th Anniversary release of Charcoal Lane. Rolling Stone Australia gave the anniversary album four-and-a-half stars.

In 2017 she featured in 1967: Music in the Key of Yes alongside Dan Sultan, Adalita, Thelma Plum, and Ursula Yovich, as part of the Sydney Festival. The show celebrated the 50th anniversary of the 1967 Australian referendum through song.

== Arts administration ==
In December 2019 Flanagan was appointed as national manager of the APRA AMCOS Aboriginal and Torres Strait Island Music Office.

In January 2020 Flanagan was appointed First Nations export producer at Sounds Australia. The role entails attending key international events such as SXSW, The Great Escape Festival, Folk Alliance International, and WOMEX, as well as establishing an international bursary program for Indigenous artists. Her first assignment in the role was attending the International Indigenous Music Summit (Note: Name per website.) in New Orleans, United States.

== Television appearances ==
Flanagan has appeared on the Australian TV music quiz shows Spicks & Specks and RocKwiz; on the latter performing Elvis Costello's Shipbuilding in a duet with composer David Bridie. Faboriginal and RocKwiz.

She has also appeared on the light comedy sports programme Marngrook Footy Show, performing a version of Stevie Wonder's For Once in My Life.

== Collaborations and projects ==
- Mission Songs Project
- Buried Country
- Black Arm Band
- 1967: Music in the Key of Yes
- Exiles
- Seven Songs To Leave Behind
- Midnight Muses
- MASS
- Liberty Songs
- Songtrails

== Discography ==
=== Studio albums ===
List of studio albums, with selected details
Title	Album details
Leah Flanagan (as Leah Flanagan Band)	Released: 2008; Label: Leah Flanagan; Formats: CD, Digital download
Nirvana Nights	Released: 2010; Label: Leah Flanagan, Vitamin; Formats: CD, Digital download
Saudades	Released: 16 September 2016; Label: Leah Flanagan; Formats: Digital download, streaming, Vinyl
Oceanic Sessions	Released: November 2017; Label: Leah Flanagan; Formats: CD+Digital download, streaming
Colour By Number	Released: 16 October 2020; Label: Leah Flanagan, Small Change Records; Formats: Digital download, streaming, Vinyl

=== Extended plays ===
List of EPs, with selected details
Title	EP details
Live at the Bella Union	Released: May 2017; Label: Leah Flanagan; Formats: Digital download, streaming

== Awards and nominations ==
=== National Indigenous Music Awards ===
The National Indigenous Music Awards (NIMA) recognise contributions to the Northern Territory music industry. They commenced in 2004.

Year	Nominee / work	Award	Result	Ref.
2021	Colour by Number	Album of the Year	Nominated	
