= Listen to Little Red =

Studio album by Little Red
- Released: 2008
- Recorded: 2007–2008
- Genre: Indie pop
- Length: 38:50
- Label: Hooch Hound Records (distributed by Shock Records)
- Producer: Steven Schram

Little Red chronology
Listen to Little Red (2008)	Midnight Remember (2010)

Professional ratings
Review scores
Source	Rating
The Age	4/5 stars
Laneway Magazine	Positive link

Listen to Little Red is the debut studio album by Australian rock band Little Red, released through Shock Records on 28 June 2008. Listen to Little Red entered and peaked at number 29 on the Australian album charts. The album's label, Hooch Hound Records, was created by the band and named after a song that failed to make it to the album.

== Track listing ==
No.	Title	Length
1.	"Coca Cola"	2:22
2.	"Witchdoctor"	2:09
3.	"Misty, I"	2:30
4.	"Speedo"	2:22
5.	"Fool"	3:12
6.	"Little Annie"	2:17
7.	"It's Alright"	2:17
8.	"So Long"	2:19
9.	"Stare in Love"	3:24
10.	"She's Not the Only One"	2:18
11.	"Jackie Cooper"	1:51
12.	"If You're Lonely"	2:29
13.	"Believe in Your Man"	2:49
14.	"Isabella"	1:47
15.	"Fight Song"	2:07
16.	"Autumn Leaves"	2:29
Total length:		38:50

== Charts ==
Chart (2008)	Peak position
Australian Albums (ARIA)	29
