= Sam Watson (political activist) =

Indigenous Australian activist

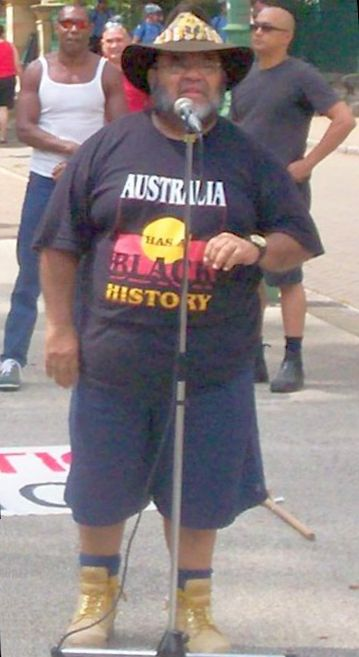
- Watson in 2007 at an Invasion Day rally
- Born: Samuel William Watson; 16 November 1952; Brisbane, Queensland, Australia
- Died: 27 November 2019 (aged 67); Brisbane
- Occupations: Writer; filmmaker; political activist
- Political party: Socialist Alliance (after 2004)
- Other political affiliations: Australian Black Panther Party (1971)
- Partner: Cathy
- Children: 2, including Samuel Wagan Watson

Samuel William Watson (16 November 1952 – 27 November 2019), also known as Sammy Watson Jnr, was an Aboriginal Australian activist from the 1970s, who in later life stood as a Socialist Alliance candidate. He is known for being a co-founder of the Australian Black Panther Party in 1971/2. Through work at the Brisbane Aboriginal Legal Service in the early 1990s, Watson was involved in implementing the findings of the Royal Commission into Aboriginal Deaths in Custody. From 2009 was deputy director at the Aboriginal and Torres Strait Islander Studies Unit at the University of Queensland.

He was also a writer and a filmmaker, and received honours for his 1990 novel The Kadaitcha Sung.

== Early life ==
Watson was born in 1952 in Brisbane, Queensland, the grandson of Sam Watson, who was of the Birri Gubba nation, while his grandmother was a Munaldjali woman. His grandfather worked in ring-barking camps and saved enough money to hire a lawyer to release him from the Aboriginal Protection Act 1869. He was one of the first Aboriginal people to achieve this status.

== Career ==
=== 1970s activism ===
Watson's first foray into Indigenous rights activism started when he was just 16, handing out how-to-vote cards at the 1967 referendum. He developed a strategy which entailed seeking equality for Indigenous Australians "by elevating the race struggle to a class struggle".

Watson was involved with, and a spokesperson for, the Aboriginal Tent Embassy in Canberra in its early days in the 1970s.

In 1971, Watson and fellow Brisbane activist Denis Walker founded the Australian Black Panther Party, also known as the Black Panther Party of Australia (Brisbane Chapter), declaring it "the vanguard for all depressed people, and in Australia the Aboriginals are the most depressed of all". The new party's manifesto was declared at a conference held at Queensland University from 28 January to 2 February 1972, saying that it would "work in a revolutionary way to achieve human rights for Aboriginal people and the alleviation of racism and racist government policy". Its stated aims were "Freedom, full employment, an end to robbery by the white man of the black community, restitution to the dispossessed, land and mineral rights, decent housing, education relevant to black history and culture, exemption from military service, an end to police brutality, murder and rape of black people, freedom for blacks in gaol, all blacks to be tried by people from their peer group, United Nations plebiscite of blacks in Australia, land, bread, housing, clothing, justice and peace". Watson said that many Indigenous Australians were inspired by the American Black Panther Party. Watson features in an episode of the 2013 documentary TV series Desperate Measures about the Black Panthers.

He protested the Bjelke-Petersen government's treatment of Aboriginal people, and marched against the 1971 Springbok rugby tour, the Vietnam war, and for civil liberties.

=== Deaths in custody (1990s) ===
Through work at the Brisbane Aboriginal Legal Service in the early nineties, Watson was involved in implementing the findings of the Royal Commission into Aboriginal Deaths in Custody. The film Black Man Down is a fictionalised exploration of the commission's findings.

=== Socialist Alliance ===
Watson was the Indigenous rights spokesperson for the Socialist Alliance, and ran as their candidate in the 2004 and 2007 federal election in Queensland. He was a candidate for that party at the 2009 state election for the seat of South Brisbane, running against the ALP state premier Anna Bligh. Watson received 344 votes (1.36%).

He represented the Socialist Alliance again as a candidate for the Senate in the 2010 federal election, where he received 3,806 votes (0.12%).

== Other activities ==
Watson is also a writer and a filmmaker, known for his 1990 novel The Kadaitcha Sung and his 1995 film Black Man Down.

In December 2009, Watson was appointed a deputy director at the Aboriginal and Torres Strait Islander Studies Unit at the University of Queensland and taught two courses in Black Australian Literature.

In October 2009, Watson was one of several people who criticised the supermarket chain Coles for naming its house brand line of biscuits "Creole Creams". Coles subsequently decided to repackage and rename the product.

Watson was a member of the working party involved in the creation of the First Nations Australia Writers Network (FNAWN) in 2012.

== Recognition and awards ==
In 1990, Watson won the FAW Patricia Weickhardt Award to an Aboriginal Writer.

He won the National Indigenous Writer of the Year Award in 1991 for his 1990 novel The Kadaitcha Sung. It was also shortlisted for the Victorian Premier's Literary Award.

His essay, Blood on the Boundary, shortlisted for the 2017 Horne Prize, was highly commended by the judges who commented that it "stands out for its vigour, for its muscularity and recklessness of style. It is also very funny, in its own weird way".

== Death and legacy ==
Watson died at a hospital in Brisbane on 27 November 2019.

He was remembered as "a giant of the Brisbane activist community". Queensland deputy premier Jackie Trad said that "Across more than half a century, he made an indelible contribution to the advancement of the rights of Indigenous Australians".

In July 2020 memorial to Watson was created in the form of a mural in Bunyapa Park, in West End, Brisbane, painted by Kamilaroi street artist Warraba Weatherall.

== Personal life ==
His lifelong partner was Cathy. Watson's son is the poet Samuel Wagan Watson, and a grandson is known as Sam Watson the fifth.

== Works ==
- Black Man Down, documentary film directed by Bill McCrow, April 1996
- The Kadaitcha Sung, Penguin Books, 1990. ISBN 978-0-14-011172-9, assisted by the Literature Board of the Australia Council
- Oodgeroo – Bloodline to Country, 2009, ISBN 978-0-908156-87-0
