= The Holidays (EP) =

EP by The Holidays
- Released: 19 April 2008
- Recorded: 2007
- Genre: Indie rock, pop rock
- Label: Liberation Music
- Producer: Anthony The & The Holidays

The Holidays chronology
The Holidays (2008)	When The Ship Goes Down EP (2008)

The Holidays EP is the first official release by the Australian indie band The Holidays. It was released on 19 April 2008. The lead single off the EP was "Holiday" which received high rotation on the national youth radio station, Triple J.

== Track listing ==
1. "Holiday"
2. "Planes"
3. "The Lovers"
4. "Telephone"
5. "The Werewolf You Become"
