= Phonographic Performance Company of Australia =

The Phonographic Performance Company of Australia (PPCA) is a national, non-government, non-profit organisation that represents the interest of record companies and Australian recording artists.

The PPCA is a partner organisation supporting Sounds Australia, an initiative established in 2009 to promote and showcase Australian music overseas. Other partners include the Australian Government, APRA AMCOS and various state organisations.

In 2019, APRA AMCOS and PPCA created OneMusic Australia, a joint initiative to streamline the process of music licensing in Australia.

During the early days of the COVID-19 pandemic in Australia in March 2020, the PPCA established a scheme whereby PPCA-registered artists could apply for a one-off cash advance of up to $10,000 to help them through the loss of income brought about by the cancellation of live music during the pandemic.
