= Inpress =

Australian music magazine 1988–2013

- Inpress' banner from their website
- Managing Editor: Andrew Mast
- Categories: Arts
- Frequency: Weekly
- Publisher: Street Press Australia
- First issue: 13 July 1988
- Final issue: 7 August 2013
- Country: Australia
- Based in: Melbourne
- Language: English
- Website: Official site

Inpress was a free weekly tabloid-sized music magazine (street press) that was published in Melbourne, and was released in the Geelong and Mornington Peninsula areas of Victoria, Australia. The magazine was published by Street Press Australia on a weekly basis every Wednesday.

The magazine comprised three main sections: All music news, features and reviews fall under the Inpress banner, arts and film is covered by Interval, and the central section is dance music/urban music and nightclubbing magazine Zebra, which is also distributed separately from Inpress.

The magazine was created by Rowena Webber (later Sladdin) and Andrew Watt, with the first issue was released on 13 July 1988. Webber edited the magazine for the first nine years. Subsequent editors of the paper included Andrew Mast (Managing Editor), Shane O'Donohue (Editor), Kris Swales (Zebra Editor) and Daniel Crichton-Rouse (Interval Editor). Myf Warhurst is a former editor.

Inpress also frequently published 'special features', such as their yearly Melbourne International Comedy Festival guide.

Inpress contained many popular features, including local cartoonist and musician Fred Negro's weekly cult comic strip, Pub. Other notable features within Inpress included Finish Line (industry news column), Sugarfoot's SoDa Pop (pop gossip/news column - a differently named version of which had previously appeared in Beat Magazine until early 2004; Jeff Jenkins' Howzat! (Australian indie rock and pop news), Clem Bastow's Singled Out (singles reviews column) and Anthony Carew's (some would say) notorious film reviews column in Interval, Film Carew.

in 2006, Interests associated with Inpress publishers Craig and Leigh Treweek bought the influential Sydney street press Drum Media. Craig Treweek said at the time that "This is a great opportunity to build a strong music media outlet that is supportive of the local music scene at a grass roots level."

In August 2013 Inpress and other two magazines of the company, Drum Media and Time Off, were merged under a new title, The Music. The final issue of Inpress was #1286, published on August 7, 2013.
