= Music Victoria =

Music organisation in Victoria, Australia

Music Victoria is an independent, not-for-profit organisation and peak body for contemporary music in Victoria, Australia, representing musicians, venues, music businesses and professionals, and music lovers across the contemporary Victorian music community. Music Victoria provides advocacy on behalf of the music sector, actively supports the development of the Victorian music community, and celebrates and promotes Victorian music. The mission of Music Victoria is to "enhance the positive impact contemporary music has on social, cultural and economic outcomes for all Victorians by supporting and providing opportunities to Victorian musicians, music professionals and businesses."

== History ==
In February 2010, the Victorian Government pledged an initial AUS$250,000 to assist in the set-up and initial running costs of Music Victoria. At the time, Victoria was the only Australian State or territory without an independent non-for-profit contemporary music peak body to unite and represent the industry’s interests. Music Victoria emerged from the community’s commitment to ensure Victoria’s live music scene had an all-important voice for the future. In August 2010, Patrick Donovan was appointed as the inaugural Chief executive officer (CEO) of Music Victoria after stints as The Age's Chief Music Writer and an adjunct professor of RMIT’s Bachelor of Arts (Music Business) Course. In 2017, Music Victoria developed the 10 Point Plan to help save global music scenes. The plan led to reforms in Victoria such as building code exemption and Agent of Change to save venues from inappropriate development, a liquor licensing late night freeze exemption, and deregulation of all-ages gigs.

Music Victoria has supported the creation of programs such as the Victorian Music Crawl, Live Music Professionals, Good Music Neighbours, The Regional Audit, Music Cities Convention, and The Victorian Music Development Office (VMDO) through the Victorian Government’s Music Works program, delivered by Music Victoria. Music Works is the Victorian Government’s music funding and support program.

On 4 September 2020, Patrick Donovan announced his departure as the CEO of Music Victoria. On 17 February 2021, Simone Schinkel was announced as the new CEO. Schinkel began her new role on International Women’s Day, March 8, 2021.

== Music Victoria Awards ==
Since 2013, Music Victoria has presented the Music Victoria Awards, an annual awards night celebrating music from the state of Victoria.
