= Australian Music Association =

Industry association for music products in Australia

- Founded: 1972
- Founder: John Payton Snr
- Type: Cultural institution
- Region served: Australia
- Key people: Alex Masso (CEO)
- Website: australianmusic.asn.au

The Australian Music Association (AMA) is an industry association for the music products industry in Australia, established in 1977. Its predecessor was the Australian Music Trades Association (AMTA). It hosts events such as the Melbourne Guitar Show and Sydney Drum and Percussion Show, and initiated Australian involvement in Make Music Day in 2018, now celebrated annually. The AMA published the magazine Australian Musician in print from 1995 until 2012, and online between 2014 and July 2023.

== History ==
John Payton Snr. (1920–2012) had inherited his family's music business, F. Payton and Son, founded in 1881 in Fleet Street, London. In 1969 Payton immigrated to Australia with his wife and two sons in 1969, and established F. Payton & Son in Clarence Street, Sydney, in 1972. (Note: The business continues to trade as a wholesale distributor of musical instruments across Australasia and the Pacific, now known as Paytons.) Payton approached other prominent businessmen in the Sydney music trade with his idea of creating a trade association, and the Australian Music Trades Association (AMTA) was established around 1972. Payton was its first president.

AMTA transitioned into the AMA, which was established in 1977.

== Description and membership ==
The AMA is a not-for-profit association for the music products industry in Australia, such as musical instruments and technology. It represents the industry to Australian governments, works with international partners, prepares project funding applications, and advocates for music making to the general public. It also promotes the benefits of participation and education in music education and participation in the community and aims to increase the number of people making music in Australia.

It is a member-based organisation, comprising two main groups: wholesalers (including importers, distributors, and manufacturers) and retailers. To join the association in these categories, the company must be significantly involved in manufacturing, distributing and/or selling musical instruments and technology. A third category, Associate Members, includes businesses and people associated with the industry such as music schools, repairers, luthiers, and small-scale musical instrument makers.

As of 2017, membership of the AMA comprised more than 150 companies.

== Governance and people ==
The AMA is registered as an incorporated association in Australia, since April 2000.

Executive officers have included:

- Rob Walker (1991–1999 and 2013 – February 2022); spent seven years on the executive committee until 2012, serving as president of the AMA in 2005–06
- Ian Harvey (1999–2013)
- Alex Masso (March 2022 – present), of The Vampires

== Publications ==
=== Australian Musician ===
The AMA initially launched its quarterly magazine, Australian Musician, (Note: Not to be confused with the magazine of the same name published in Adelaide from 1917 to 1918, full title The Australian Musician: A Monthly Newspaper for Bands.) in December 1995. Executive officer Rob Walker, was managing editor until 2001, when Greg Phillips took over. The aim of the magazine was "to inform, educate and entertain local musicians of all levels", and the print version was available for free at musical instrument retailers. It has included interviews with musicians such as Tommy Emmanuel, INXS, Kate Ceberano, Wolfmother, Little Birdy, Paul Dempsey, and Dave Graney. In December 2007, an all-female edition was produced by guest editor Clare Bowditch, with every single article was about female artists and every item in the magazine was written by women. Its publication was outsourced from 2011 until its final publication in print in October 2012.

In March 2014 Australian Musician was relaunched as an online publication, with similar aims, including "artist exposure and information on, and promotion of, the tools that musicians use to create their art". In July 2023 editor Greg Phillips acquired the magazine, trading under the name Mediaville. The website is archived in the Pandora archive by the National Library of Australia, and the magazine also runs a YouTube and has a presence on Facebook, Instagram, and X.

=== Music in Action ===
The AMA published Music in Action: For Australian Music Educators between 2003 and 2011. Its target audience was music educators, and each issue had five sections: Advocacy (promotion of music in schools), Technology (use in classrooms), Profile (experiences of music teacher), Nitty Gritty (practical ideas), and Project (activities outside of school).

== Events ==
AMTA held its first trade show in Melbourne in 1975.

From 1999 until 2014 the AMA presented an Australian music products trade show, the Australian Music Association Convention (AMAC).

In the 2000s the AMA played a key role in establishing "Music: Play For Life" program and its annual event, Music Count Us In, under the auspices of the Music Council of Australia.

The AMP (Australian Music Products) Conference was held in 2017 at the Gold Coast, Queensland.

=== Melbourne Guitar Show ===
The Melbourne Guitar Show (MGS) has been held since 2015, usually held at Caulfield Racecourse.

In 2017, it was co-presented by Triple M and Australian Musician. The festival has featured renowned Australian guitarists including Lloyd Spiegel, Bob Spencer, and Nick Charles, along with prominent international artists such as Nick Johnston of Mastodon and Steve Hackett of Genesis. Diesel appeared in 2017 and 2019.

The 2020 Melbourne Guitar Show featured a special livestream to celebrate Make Music Day Australia during the COVID-19 pandemic, which included well-known guitarists such as Anna Scionti, Nick Charles, and Dennis Jones

In 2023 the Guitar Show returned as a live event for the first time after a three-year hiatus. It included more than 60 retailers of guitars and accessories. In 2025 the Melbourne Guitar Show moved venues to the Melbourne Showgrounds.

=== Sydney Drum and Percussion Show ===
The inaugural Sydney Drum and Percussion Show was held in May 2017, based on the model of the Melbourne Guitar Show, and featured seminars, demonstrations, and live performances.

=== Make Music Day Australia ===
Make Music Day is held annually on 21 June, an event initiated in France in 1982 and since spread internationally. In 2018, the AMA made Australia a participant in Make Music Day for the first time. Designed to encourage everyone to pick up an instrument and play music, the event stages musical events in public spaces, celebrating all levels of ability in making music. Examples of participation in the event include music retailers hosting in-store events, employees of manufacturers creating musical flash mobs, and businesses hosting open mics or drum circles. Over 100 events in 80 locations were registered on the AMA website.

In 2021, the event was expanded, with the Live Music Office entering into partnership with the AMA to host the event. In this year, the AMA urged people to "create their own stages" to perform music on Make Music Day. Create NSW, Community Music Victoria, and the Community Broadcasting Association of Australia partnered with the association, and ambassadors for the event included Kate Ceberano, Lee Kernaghan, Sarah Carroll, Jack Howard, and Andy Baylor.

Make Music Day is coordinated in Australia by the AMA with partners including the Make Music Alliance and National Association of Music Merchants (NAMM).

In 2023, a huge international project called "Make Music, Make Friends" partnered 10 Australian schools with schools around the world to share music and greet one another on Make Music Day.

== Affiliations and other activities ==
From 2007 to 2009, the AMA partnered with the Queensland Conservatorium Research Centre Griffith University, along with the Music Council of Australia and the Australian Society for Music Education in a project called Sound Links, focusing on community music.

Since around 2008 or 2009, AMA has been a partner of the National Association of Music Merchants (NAMM), the US-based trade association and presenter of the major international trade show (the NAMM Show). With NAMM, the AMA participates in the International Coalition (of music products associations), collaborates on international advocacy relating to CITES issues, contributes to the Global Report, attends and participates in the NAMM Show, collaborates with the Oral History program, and the AMA has had various initiatives supported by the NAMM Foundation.

Around 2011-2013, the AMA played a key role in the Fair Imports Alliance, along with the Australian Retailers Association, Australian Sporting Goods Association, Australian Booksellers Association, Australian Fishing Trade Association, Australian Toy Association, Bicycle Industries Australia, Photo Marketing Association, and the Retail Cycle Traders Association. The group lobbied for changes to the Low Value Importation Threshold.

In November 2018, ABC Television aired Don't Stop the Music, a three-part series which documented the launch and progress of a music program in a primary school in an underprivileged area of Perth. The AMA promoted the series and project on their website.

In 2018–2019, the AMA made submissions to the House of Representatives Standing Committee on Communications and the Arts Inquiry into the Australian Music Industry. The report was published in March 2019. In 2024 the AMA made submissions and gave evidence at the Inquiry into the challenges and opportunities within the Australian live music industry and the Joint Select Committee on Arts and Music Education and Training in New South Wales.

The AMA interacts with other industry associations in the music industry, retail industry, and small business. It is a member of COSBOA (Council of Small Business Australia).

In July 2023 the AMA announced an affiliation with the National Retail Association. This gives the organisation free access to the National Retail Association's support and services, including a hotline that gives advice and provides resources on matters such as rates of pay, leave entitlements, dealing with complaints about discrimination or sexual harassment, and many other issues.

The association maintains and supplies statistics on the sale of musical instruments; for example, it reported that there had been a surge in the importation of ukeleles during the COVID-19 pandemic in Australia in 2020, and that Australia imports most of its pianos (7,416 in 2017).

== Honour Roll ==
In 2001, AMA created an honour roll for people who have made a significant contribution to the industry over a long period of time, after their retirement, or posthumously to their families. As of 2023, recipients of the association's highest honour are:

- John Payton Snr (F. Payton & Son)
- Alan Rose (Rose Music)
- Bill May (Maton Guitars)
- Geoff Brash (Brashs)
- Neville Chambers
- Frank & Tony Lamberti (Lambertis)
- John Egan (Roland, Allans Music Group & others)
- Peter Hayward (Australis Music & others)
- John Morris (Australian Academy of Music)
- Norm Lurie (Music Sales)
- Glenn Dodson (Roland & others)
- Ross Cole (Cove Music, Dicksons Music)
- Margaret O'Loughlin (CBS, Fender)
- Steve Lincoln-Smith (Rose Music, Yamaha, Innovative Music & others)
- Rob Walker (AMA, NAMM, Allans / Allans Billy Hydes)
- Sandra Lindsay (Musos Corner, Foley's Pianos)
- Philip Burn (Hal Leonard Australia)
