= Australian music publications of the 60s =

The most influential and popular music-related Australian publication of the 1960s was the weekly magazine, Go-Set, which was published from 1966 to 1974. It published the first Australian national singles chart from October 1966 and the first national albums chart from May 1970. The magazine also presented a popularity poll of readers, which led to the King of Pop Awards. Its local competitors during that decade were Everybody's (1961–1968), Oz (1963–1966), Albert Sebastian (1966–1968), Gas (1968–1971) and Revolution (1969–1971).

== Everybody's 1961–1968 ==
Everybody's was published by Australian Consolidated Press, owned by Frank Packer from mid-1961. It developed from the combination of earlier publications, Women's Mirror and Weekend, consequently it originally targeted women readers. Post-1963 it began to address local pop culture, teen market and beat music developments.

== Oz ==
Oz was established in Sydney in April 1963 by university students Richard Neville, Richard Walsh and Martin Sharp as well as journalist Peter Grose. The magazine mainly dealt with wider youth and counter-cultural issues, but included music-related articles. Neville relocated to London where he founded a local edition of Oz in 1967.

== Go-Set 1966–1974 ==
Go-Set was founded in Melbourne in February 1966 by former Monash University students Phillip Frazer, Tony Schauble and Doug Panther. It chronicled major events and performers in Australian popular music, as well as regular columns by Melbourne radio DJ Stan Rofe, fan-turned-commentator Ian "Molly" Meldrum, journalist Lily Brett, music historian Ed Nimmervoll and Australian fashion designer Prue Acton. Go-Set published the first national Australian record charts starting with singles in October 1966 (all charts prior to this were state-based or capital-city based) and adding albums in May 1970, which were compiled by Nimmervoll. Go-Set conducted a popularity poll of performers by its readers from 1966 to 1972, which led to the King of Pop Awards starting with Normie Rowe in 1967. Although it was explicitly established as a "teens and twenties" magazine, in its later years, inspired by newer publications like Rolling Stone magazine, Go-Set took on a more mature presentation, with rock performers Jim Keays, Vince Lovegrove, Lynne Randell and Wendy Saddington writing for the magazine.
