= EG Awards of 2006 =

Annual Australian music awards ceremony

- Date: October 2006
- Venue: Melbourne, Victoria
- Hosted by: Dave Graney

Highlights
- Most wins: Crowded House (2)

The EG Awards of 2006 are the first Annual The Age EG (Entertainment Guide) Awards and took place at the Prince of Wales in October 2006.

The awards were created to celebrate The Age's Entertainment Guide's 21st birthday, and people were asked to vote in a number of categories from acts over the past 21 years. More than 37,000 votes were tallied in the poll.

== Hall of Fame inductees / EG Legends ==
TISM

MC Dave Graney accepting the award on behalf of TISM, (who wear masks when in public) saying, "Legend is an over-used word, but the Melbourne music scene is full of them. As merciless watchdogs of affectation, preciousness, hype and general bull---- in popular culture, they are without doubt the hardest working individuals ever to don balaclavas and dance like their pills are on fire."

== Performers ==
- Bonnie Tyler - "Total Eclipse of the Heart"
- Renee Geyer - "Under the Milky Way"

== Award nominees and winners ==
Winners indicated below in boldface

Best Album	Best Song
**Crowded House - Woodface**	**The Church - "Under the Milky Way"**
Best Male	Best Female
**Paul Kelly**	**Kylie Minogue**
Best Group	Best New Talent
**Crowded House**	**Ground Components**
Best Tour	Best Venue
**Nick Cave and the Bad Seeds at Sidney Myer Music Bowl, 2003**	**The Espy**

Crowded House's Neil Finn said "The songs on Woodface were first written in East St Kilda, rehearsed in South Melbourne, and mostly recorded in South Yarra and Caulfield." Finn added "Melbourne was the birthplace of Crowded House and was always the town we chose to return to. It's forever deeply ingrained in our collective psyche and was the backdrop for many of our best musical moments," he said, before leaving open the possibility of a Hester-less band reunion."
