= The Music (magazine) =

Australian music publication

- Drum Media cover of 25 September 2007 issue
- Editor: Daniel Cribb
- Categories: Music
- Frequency: Monthly
- Publisher: Street Press Australia
- First issue: September 1990
- Country: Australia
- Based in: Melbourne
- Website: themusic.com.au

The Music (formerly known as and now incorporating Drum Media) is an online Australian music magazine. It previously existed as a street press devoted to long-form music journalism and commentary, music news, and artist interviews. In its printed form, it was based in Sydney and distributed throughout Sydney, Wollongong, Newcastle, Canberra and surrounding areas. The magazine changed its name to The Music (incorporating Drum Media) in 2013, following the merge with two other magazines, Brisbane's Time Off and Melbourne's Inpress, owned by Street Press Australia. In 2020 the print edition was paused.

== Drum Media ==
Drum Media was founded in 1990 as a free weekly tabloid-sized music magazine (street press).

The first issue of Drum Media appeared on 16 September 1990 with a distribution of 40,000 and featured Midnight Oil on the cover. The magazine had been established after the entire staff of the long-running Sydney street press magazine On The Street staged a mass walk out on 6 September after a dispute with the owner over work conditions and pay. Following a meeting at the Excelsior Hotel in Surry Hills, it was decided to start a new magazine with editor Margaret Cott and her sister, advertising manager Jennifer Cott, daughters of Mac Cott, founding editor of the Southern Highland News, Bowral, providing the initial capital. The magazine rented its first office in Orwell Street, Potts Point, and the first issue was released ten days later.

A separate weekly issue began circulating in Perth in September 2006. Publishers Craig and Leigh Treweek bought Drum Media in February 2006 and consolidated it with Melbourne street magazine Inpress under the Street Press Australia banner. Craig Treweek said at the time, "This is a great opportunity to build a strong music media outlet that is supportive of the local music scene at a grass roots level."

The last issue of Sydney's Drum Media was number 1172 dated 7 August 2013. The final Perth edition was number 350 dated 8 August 2013.

== The Music ==
On 14 August 2013, Street Press Australia launched the first issue of The Music (incorporating Drum Media, Inpress and Time Off), as a free national music magazine with additional columns on topics about popular culture. The Music printed Melbourne, Sydney, and Brisbane editions but ceased publication in 2020. The final editions were published in March 2020, but they have continued to publish content online.

Street Press Australia was later rebranded as Handshake, and in October 2021 they sold The Music to SGC Media, owners of music titles Purple Sneakers and Countrytown. At the same time it was announced the print edition of The Music was "on hold".

== Distribution and circulation ==
In September 2007, the readership of Drum Media throughout its distribution area in New South Wales was audited at 125,000. The magazine was published every Tuesday and distributed primarily throughout music stores, hotels and entertainment venues, cafes and university campuses in Sydney, Newcastle, Wollongong and Canberra, as well as satellite areas including Wyong and Gosford and the Blue Mountains. In Western Australia, the readership was estimated at 100,000 with distribution covering Perth, Bunbury, Margaret River, Geraldton and Albany.

In February 2026 the title had a unique Australian audience of 330,000 according to the IPSOS Iris survey and claimed over 20 million monthly social views.

Archives of The Music and its former publications can be accessed via the archives on The Music website.

== See also ==
- Tony Mott
