= Post Paradise =

Studio album by The Holidays
- Released: 24 September 2010
- Recorded: September 2009 – June 2010
- Genres: Indie rock, Pop rock, Soul
- Labels: Liberation Music (Australia), Rallye Label (Japan)
- Producer: The Holidays

The Holidays chronology
Golden Sky (2010)	Post Paradise (2010)

Post Paradise is the debut album by Australian band The Holidays. In Australia, it was released on 24 September 2010, and in Japan in January 2011 on the Rallye Label. Among other accolades, The Holidays won the Australian Music Prize's Red Bull Award for Best Debut Album, as well as being shortlisted for the actual Australian Music Prize.

== Background and release ==
Recorded at home and self-produced, with additional recording and production at BJB Studios, Post Paradise was mixed at Sing Sing Studios in Melbourne by Tony Espie and mastered by David Walker at Stepford Audio Melbourne. Recording began in September 2009, and was completed sporadically throughout most of 2010, finishing in June 2010.

The first single from the album "Moonlight Hours" was released in December 2009, followed by "Golden Sky" in May 2010 and Broken Bones upon the release of the album. A music video was made for all three tracks, and they all received solid airplay on Australian community radio stations and Triple J.

Recorded at home and self-produced, with additional recording and production at BJB Studios with the help of Burke Reid, Moonlight Hours was the most played track on national youth radio station Triple J for the week ending 26 December 2009.

The album has received positive reviews since its release, including "Album of the Week" in Drum Media, Beat Magazine, The Brag, and received 5 stars in BMA Mag, 4.5 stars in The Herald Sun, The Courier Mail and The Daily Telegraph as well as positive reviews in The Age and The Sydney Morning Herald. Post Paradise won Album of the Year in the EG Awards 2010, and was the Triple J Feature Album for the week commencing 26 December 2010. It also won Best Debut Album in the Australian Music Prize's Red Bull Award.

The Holidays completed a national album tour following the release of Post Paradise, in late September/early October 2010 in Australia.

Fourth single "6am" was added to radio nationwide in early January 2011, whilst track "2 Days" was picked up by Triple J in early 2011.

== Track listing ==
All tracks are written by Simon Jones & arranged by The Holidays except 1,8 & 10 (Jones/Kerridge), 3 & 11 (Jones/Magnus) and 5 (Jones/Kerridge/Magnus/Kortt).

No.	Title	Length
1.	"Heavy Feathers"	4:03
2.	"Moonlight Hours"	3:36
3.	"2 Days"	3:11
4.	"6AM"	4:52
5.	"Golden Sky"	4:23
6.	"Broken Bones"	3:53
7.	"Indian Summer Anniversary"	3:35
8.	"Conga"	3:55
9.	"Slimeface"	4:28
10.	"A Million Eyes"	3:58
Total length:		39:50

iTunes/Japanese release bonus tracks

No.	Title	Length
11.	"Monday Morning Bermuda Triangle"	4:50
12.	"Colour Memories"	4:02
