= Beat (magazine) =

Australian music magazine (1986–present)

- Beat Magazine's November 2023 Cover
- Editor: Lucas Radbourne
- Categories: Arts
- Frequency: Monthly
- Publisher: Furst Media
- First issue: 30 July 1986
- Country: Australia
- Based in: Melbourne
- Language: English
- Website: beat.com.au

Beat is a free monthly tabloid-sized music, arts and culture magazine (street press), website and social media network published and distributed in Melbourne, Australia. It is Melbourne's longest running street press, and one of the earliest street press magazines after TAGG.

Beat paused its print edition between March 2020-May 2022 due to the COVID-19 pandemic and prolonged Victorian lockdowns, but has since resumed publishing.

== History ==
The magazine was founded as a weekly street press by Rob Furst and was printed by his company Furst Media. Between 1994 and 1998 a Sydney edition was printed, known as Beat : Sydney Listings Bible. The magazines and their online component were published each Wednesday, with the printed magazines distributed to nearly 1,000 locations in 1997. By 2020 the Melbourne edition was distributed to over 3,200 locations. They're currently printed and distributed towards the end of each month, covering a range of events happening in the proceeding month.

The magazine has shifted between calling itself Beat and Beat Magazine periodically throughout its history. Beat's main competitor was Inpress, a Melbourne-based street press which was co-created by Rowena Sladdin in 1988 after she had left Beat.

In May 2012, 35,000 of the magazine copies were printed and distributed with a cartoon drawing of a naked man on its cover. The text "Sayonara, Bitches! It's been real" were written above the man's genitalia and many feared this would be Beat's final issue. Beat explained on their website that the cover was meant to feature English band Kaiser Chiefs, but the cover had been swapped out by their typesetter on his last day of work as a prank.

Beat announced in 2019 they would begin publishing fortnightly, starting with issue #1673. Both the magazine and Beat's website were also redesigned at this time. The subject of the magazine also expanded beyond music, and now included video games, film, and television.

The print issue of Beat was temporarily suspended after issue #1695, published on 11 March 2020, due to the inability to distribute street press magazines during the COVID-19 pandemic and Victorian lockdowns. The magazine shifted its focus temporarily to its website, social media accounts and email newsletters, which it continues to send out regularly to subscribers. In May 2022, its editor Lucas Radbourne announced that the print issue had returned, and was available freely again as a monthly magazine.

=== Online ===
Beat's website contains a long-running Gig Guide which allows venues and event promoters across Melbourne to upload events for free. This was started originally in print before the internet. The online gig guide is a well-known aspect of Beat's online coverage.

All of the magazine's print editions since its 1600th issue are available to read on its website while issues dating back to January, 2012 - issue 1,303 - are available to read for free via the publication's Issuu page.

=== Notable former covers ===
While Beat has primarily featured Australian artists and has often spotlighted small-profile, alternative acts, the magazine has featured a range of high-profile international artists on its cover. These are some of the notable cover stars since 2012.

- 17 January 2012 - Soundgarden
- 28 February 2012 - Marilyn Manson
- 16 January 2013 - The Killers
- 12 February 2013 - Rodriguez
- 27 February 2013 - Slayer
- 20 March 2013 - Jimmy Cliff
- 10 December 2013 - Nile Rodgers
- 17 December 2013 - Snoop Dogg
- 10 June 2014 - Lily Allen
- 24 June 2014 - Jack White
- 19 August 2014 - Nick Cave
- 19 November 2014 and 20 September 2017 - Foo Fighters
- 17 February 2015 - Slipknot
- 15 April 2015 - Gang of Youths
- 3 May 2016 - Iron Maiden
- 12 July 2017 - HAIM
- 25 October 2017 - Yothu Yindi
- 4 July 2018 - Yungblud
- 26 December 2018 - Action Bronson
- 16 January 2019 - Bring Me The Horizon
- 2 October 2019 - KISS
- 15 January 2020 - Fatboy Slim
- 5 July 2023 - Yeah Yeah Yeahs
- 1 June 2025 - Suki Waterhouse
