= Rock It (Little Red song) =

Single by Little Red

from the album Midnight Remember
- Released: 4 June 2010
- Length: 3:28
- Label: Liberation Music
- Songwriter: Dominic Byrne

Little Red singles chronology
"Waiting" / "Wait Is Over" (2009)	"Rock It" (2010)	"Slow Motion" (2010)

"Rock It" is a song by Australian rock band Little Red and is the fourth track on their 2010 album, Midnight Remember. The song was released as the first single from the Midnight Remember album on 4 June 2010 by Liberation Music in Australia and New Zealand. The song was certified Platinum and later placed at number 2 on the Triple J Hottest 100, 2010. The song was used during the opening montage of the "Hope for the Hopeless" episode of Grey's Anatomy (series 8, episode 12).

At the AIR Awards of 2010, the song won Best Independent Single/EP.

At the EG Awards of 2010, the band won Best New Talent with "Rock It".

It was used as background music for Brisbane City Councils Public Transport 2019 advertisement.

In 2023, Vance Joy sang a cover of the song for the 50th anniversary of Mushroom Group.

== Charts ==
Chart (2010)	Peak position
Australia (ARIA)	19

== Certifications ==
Region	Certification	Certified units/sales
Australia (ARIA)	Platinum	70,000^{^}
^{^} Shipments figures based on certification alone.
