= Little Red (band) =

Australian pop and rock band

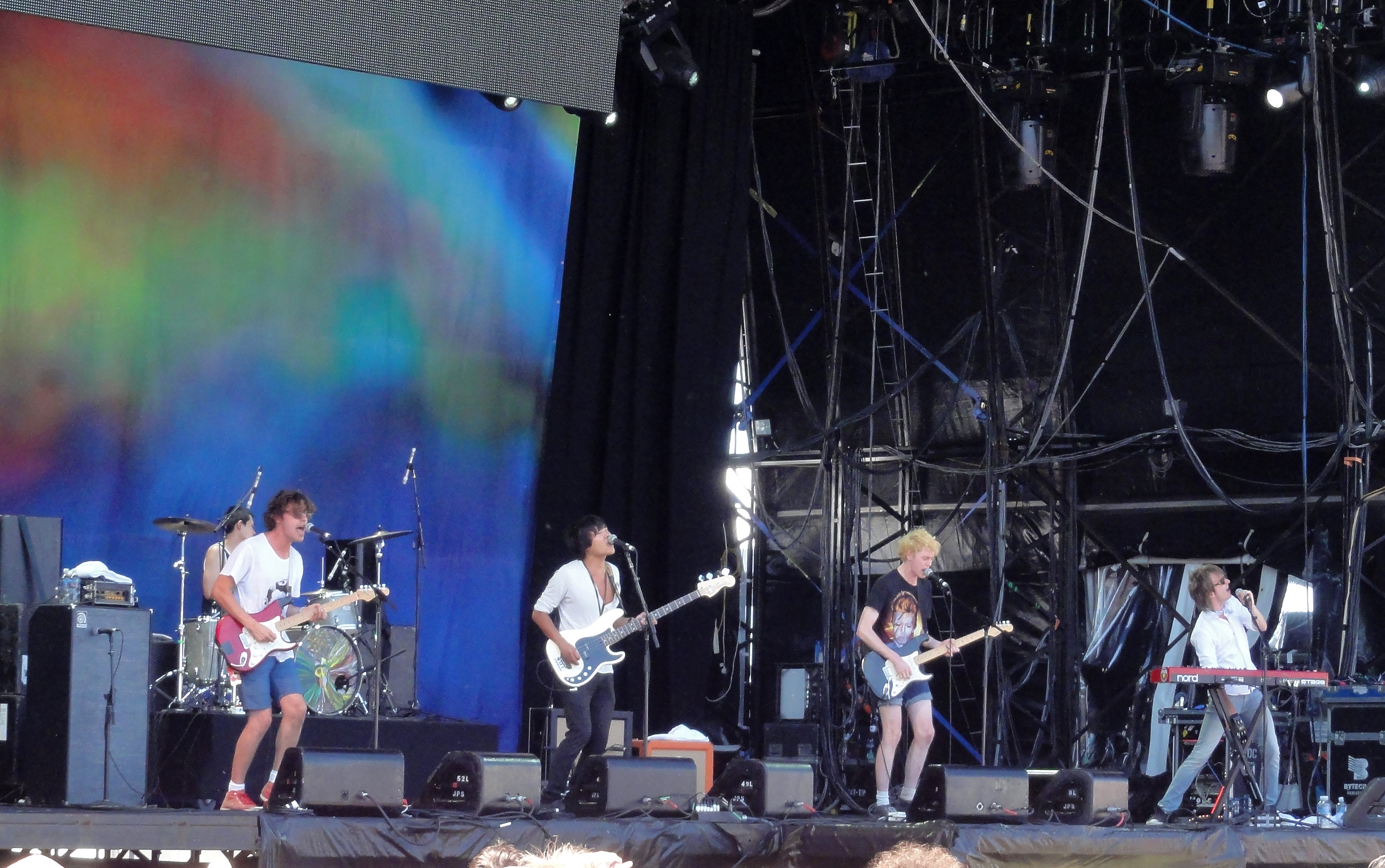
- (L to R): Taka Honda, Adrian Beltrame, Quang Dinh, Dominic Byrne, Tom Hartney; January 2010, Melbourne

Background information
- Origin: Melbourne, Victoria, Australia
- Genres: Pop; rock
- Years active: 2005–2012
- Labels: Hooch Hound/Shock; Liberation
- Past members: Adrian Beltrame; Dominic Byrne; Quang Dinh; Tom Hartney; Taka Honda
- Website: myspace.com/littleredmusic

Little Red was an Australian pop and rock band formed in 2005 by Adrian Beltrame on guitar, keyboard and vocals, Dominic Byrne on guitar and vocals, Quang Dinh on bass guitar and vocals, Tom Hartney on harmonica, keyboard and vocals, and Taka Honda on drums. They issued two albums, Listen to Little Red (28 June 2008) and Midnight Remember (September 2010). The second album peaked at No. 5 on the ARIA Albums Chart. It provided their highest-charting single, "Rock It" (June 2010), which reached the top 20 on the ARIA Singles Chart. At the EG Awards of 2010, they won Best New Talent.

The group disbanded in August 2012.

== History ==
Little Red was formed in 2005 in Melbourne by Adrian Beltrame on guitar, keyboard and vocals, Dominic Byrne on guitar and vocals, Quang Dinh on bass guitar and vocals, Tom Hartney on harmonica, keyboard and vocals, and Taka Honda on drums. They entered the Triple J Unearthed competition. They won the 2008 Australia-wide Garage to V competition held by Virgin Mobile for a slot at all shows of the Australian V Festival in that year, while they also performed at the Falls Festival, Meredith Music Festival, the Big Day Out, the Pyramid Rock Festival and the Laneway Festival.

Little Red's tracks, "Waiting", "Coca-Cola" and "Witch Doctor" received regular play on national youth radio station, Triple J, while "Coca-Cola" was used on the official soundtrack of Australian TV series, Underbelly. It was listed at No. 47 on the Triple J Hottest 100, 2008. Their debut five-track extended play, Get Ready!, appeared in April 2008. Australian musicologist, Ian McFarlane, observed, "[they] shone briefly but brightly, playing a sunny, hopelessly romantic brand of retro-pop."

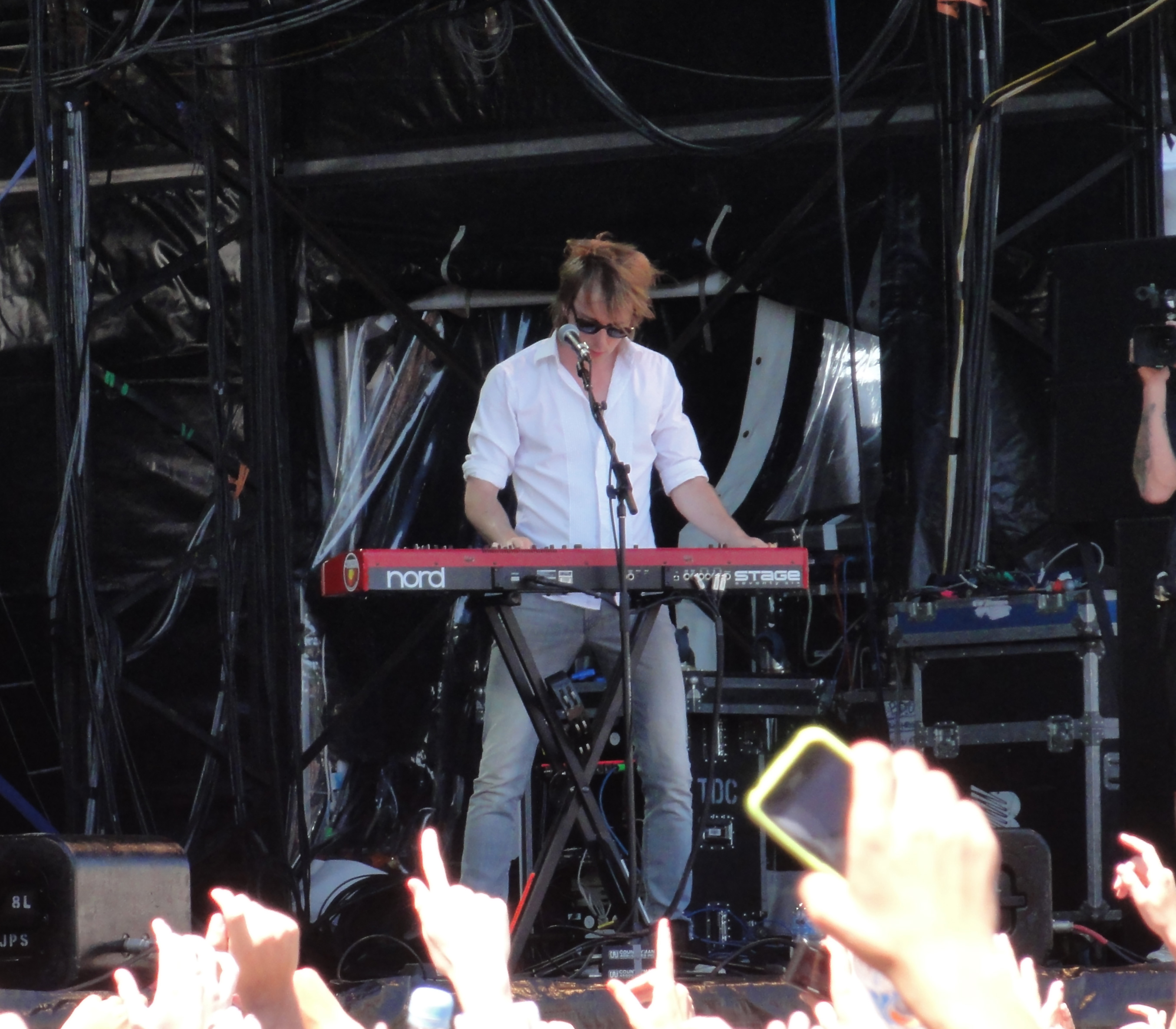
Tom Hartney on keyboard

They independently released their debut album, Listen to Little Red, on 28 June 2008, which debuted at No. 29 on the ARIA Albums Chart. It was issued outside Australia by the United Kingdom label, Lucky Number Music on 16 November 2009 and early in 2010 for other markets.

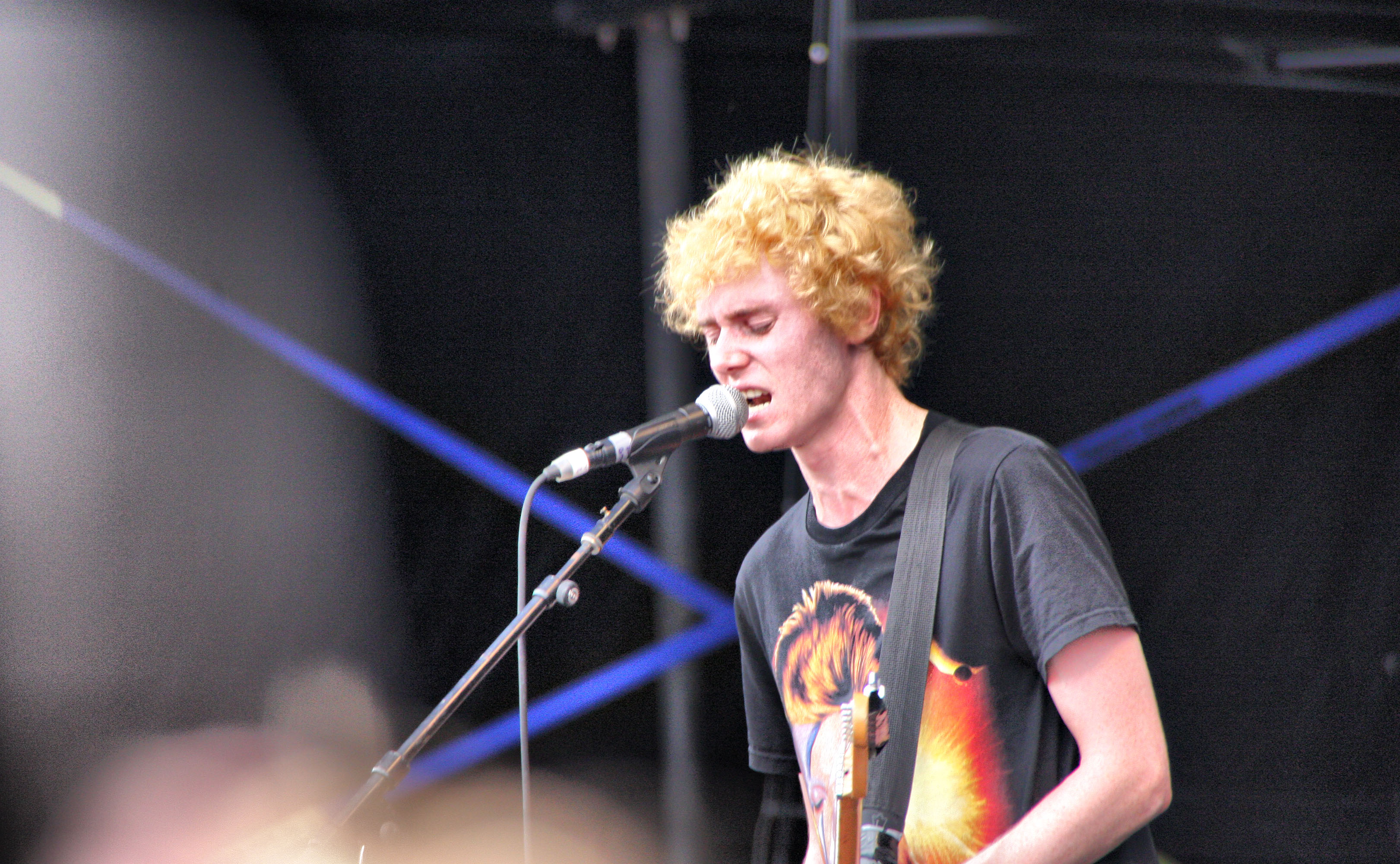
Dominic Byrne, Big Day Out, Sydney, January 2011

Little Red's second album, Midnight Remember, appeared in September 2010, which reached No. 5. McFarlane felt, "it was a more mature recording, eschewing the naivety of the debut for greature depth and texture." It provided a single, "Rock It" (June 2010), which peaked in the top 20, and gained gold accreditation for shipment of 35000 copies.

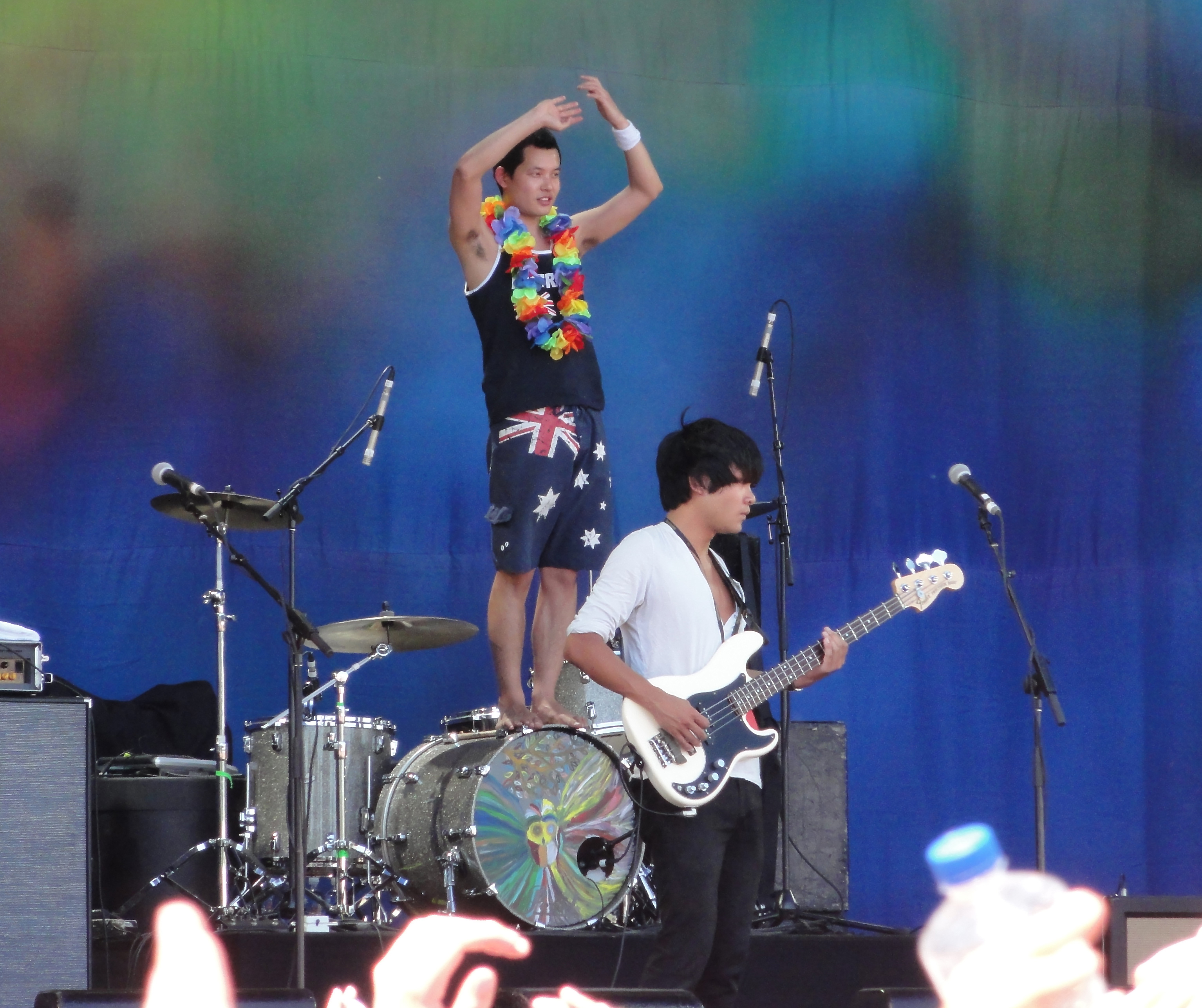
Taka Honda stands on his bass drum, Quang Dinh in front on his bass guitar.

"Rock It" was listed at No. 2 in Triple J's Hottest 100 of 2010, with the album's second single, "Slow Motion", at 79th position. "Rock It" also received the Australian Independent Record (AIR) Award for Best Independent Single/EP. It was used on the soundtrack for the romantic comedy film, No Strings Attached (January 2011). On 21 April 2011 they released a music video for "All Mine", also from Midnight Remember, through Liberation Music.

Little Red disbanded in 2012.

== Discography ==
=== Albums ===
List of studio albums, with release date and selected chart positions shown
| Title | Album details | Peak chart positions | Certification |
| Title | Album details | AUS | Certification |
|---|---|---|---|
| Listen to Little Red | Released: 28 June 2008; Label: Hooch Hound/Shock Records; Format: CD, digital download | 29 | |
| Midnight Remember | Released: September 2010; Label: Liberation Music; Format: CD, digital download | 5 | ARIA: Gold |

=== Extended plays ===
List of extended plays, with selected details
| Title | EP details |
|---|---|
| Get Ready! | Released: 28 April 2008; Label: Shock Records (LRED01); Format: CD, digital download |

=== Singles ===
List of singles, with year and selected chart positions shown
| Title | Year | Peak chart positions | Certification | Album |
| Title | Year | AUS | Certification | Album |
|---|---|---|---|---|
| "Waiting" | 2007 | — | | Get Ready! |
| "Coca Cola / It's Alright" | 2009 | — | | Listen to Little Red |
| "Rock It" | 2010 | 19 | ARIA: Platinum | Midnight Remember |
| "Slow Motion" | 2010 | — | | Midnight Remember |
| "All Mine" | 2011 | — | | Midnight Remember |

== Awards and nominations ==
=== AIR Awards ===
The Australian Independent Record Awards (commonly known informally as AIR Awards) is an annual awards night to recognise, promote and celebrate the success of Australia's Independent Music sector.

| Year | Nominee / work | Award | Result |
|---|---|---|---|
| 2008 | Listen to Little Red | Best Independent Album | Nominated |
| 2008 | themselves | Best New Independent Artist | Nominated |
| 2010 | "Rock It!" | Best Independent Single/EP | Won |
| 2010 | themselves | Most Popular Independent Artist | Nominated |

=== ARIA Music Awards ===
The ARIA Music Awards are a set of annual ceremonies presented by Australian Recording Industry Association (ARIA), which recognise excellence, innovation, and achievement across all genres of the music of Australia. They commenced in 1987.

| Year | Nominee / work | Award | Result | Ref. |
|---|---|---|---|---|
| 2011 | Midnight Remember | Best Adult Alternative Album | Nominated | |

=== EG Awards ===
| Year | Nominee / work | Award | Result |
|---|---|---|---|
| 2010 | themselves | Best New Talent | Won |
