= Music street press of Australia =

Street press in Australia

Australia has had a long history of street press media, beginning in the 1980s. Most street press have been centred around music and gig guides, but subjects have also included movies, fashion, and food. Each major city in Australia had at least two music street press at some point, and they were at their most popular during the 1990s.

During the height of their popularity most were initially tabloid size, and printed on newsprint with glossy covers. Later titles shrunk to A4 size magazine.

== State-based titles ==
=== Victoria ===
One of Australia's earliest street press was TAGG – The Alternative Gig Guide, which ran between 1979 and 1981. It was originally published in Melbourne before a Sydney edition was launched in 1980.

In Melbourne during the 1980s, Beat Magazine and Inpress were both published weekly, with Beat first published in 1986 and Inpress following two years later. Beat was founded by Rob Furst and published by his company Furst Media, while Inpress was published by Street Press Australia. Both companies would go onto own and run multiple street press titles across Australia.

Forte was started in 1991 by Anton Ballard and Robert Bufton as a regional gig guide, similar to Beat. It was published in Geelong and distributed to Ballarat, Bendigo, Castlemaine, Geelong, Surfcoast and Warrnambool. In 2015 Furst Media became their publisher, starting with issue #619 on August 20. Mixdown, a street press magazine focused on music creation and audio production, launched in 1993 and is printed by Furst Media as a national street press.

=== New South Wales ===
In 1989, 3D World began in Sydney, and ran until 2011. The magazine focused on dance music and club culture. Its main competitor was The Brag, published by Furst Media. 3D World was purchased by Street Press Media in 2009, and they expanded to Melbourne and Brisbane in 2010 before closing the print edition the following year. It was then revived in August 2011 as Three Magazine, an iPad-only magazine. It had been removed for the App store by 2014.

Sydney also had On The Street, which began in 1980 before its staff led a mass walkout and started a rival publication Drum Media in 1990. A similar story occurred when Sydney's Revolver closed in 2003, after six years of publication, and its staff created a new magazine Evolver. When Revolver's publisher threatened to sue due to the new magazine's similarities to theirs, Evolver was renamed The Brag. This new title was briefly owned by Furst Media until 2016, and was published weekly until 2017 when it became fortnightly, then monthly, and in 2018 moved to quarterly.

Also in NSW, Newcastle's Reverb ran from 2006 to 2012, and became an online only publication from 2013.

=== Queensland ===
During the 1980s Time Off was published in Brisbane, after starting as a campus newspaper at the University of Queensland in 1976. It became a widely available bi-weekly title from March 14, 1980. Rave Magazine was also published in Brisbane, starting in 1991 and ran for 1047 issues until 2012.

Scene Magazine was started in 1993 in Brisbane, and focused on dance music to differentiate themselves from the more rock focused Rave and Time Off. They would later rename themselves as scenestr and become national in the 2000s.

=== South Australia ===
- Rip It Up was published weekly in Adelaide, beginning in 1989 before it went digital in 2014 and ceased publication in 2016. Although not officially part of Street Press Australia, it was added to the network via an agency agreement in 2008.
- dB Magazine, edited by Alex Wheaton, ran between October 1991 and 2010 in print, and up to 2014 online.
- BSide Magazine, founded by former Rip It Up editor Robert Dunstan, began publishing in 2015 as a print magazine, but afterwards went online as a fortnightly magazine.
- The Note is a monthly magazine focused on local music, food, and other culture. It has been published monthly, in print and online, since January 2023. It includes a gig guide, news, reviews, and interviews. Director Olly Raggatt also launched the mini-festival Notestock in 2023, based at UniBar Adelaide. In 2024, Notestock, scheduled for 29 November, is the last event in Music SA's Good Music Month, and features Private Function from Melbourne as well as a number of local acts, including West Thebarton.

=== Western Australia ===
Perth's X-Press started in 1985 as a weekly title, later shifting to monthly in 2014, and the city also had their own edition of Drum Media (now The Music) starting in 2006.

=== Australian Capital Territory ===
BMA Magazine began publishing in Canberra in 1992, and is still publishing in 2022 as a fortnightly title. Drum Media was also distributed in Canberra from Sydney.

=== Northern Territory ===
Starting in 1996, Pulse NT was published in Darwin and called themselves, "The Northern Territory's first street mag: local, national, international music and reviews." It was published monthly by Pulse Street Press.

== National titles and mergers ==
In 2006 the owners of Inpress formed Street Press Australia and took over The Drum Media and Time Off, before merging them all together in 2013 as The Music. Alongside the new name came a smaller A4 size and a less frequent publication as The Music went monthly, shifting their focus away from being a weekly local gig guide. In 2018 Street Press Australia ceased to exist, and their assets were taken over by Handshake Media who continued to publish The Music on Australia's east coast.

Furst Media's titles such as Beat and The Brag had been the major competitor with Street Press Australia in their cities, but never expanded further or merged their titles nationally. Instead they joined Beat, The Brag, Rave, dB, and X-Press under the banner of the National Street Press in 2009, but the companies remained separate.

Perth's X-Press was merged with The Music in 2015, but continued to be printed under its own name. X-Press was later put up for sale in April 2016.

In 2017 The Brag was acquired by Seventh Street Media, and they ran The Brag alongside music websites Tone Deaf, The Industry Observer, and Rolling Stone Australia.

Scene Magazine, which had started in Brisbane in 1993, created a Melbourne edition in 2003. They downsized from their tabloid style magazine to A4 glossy in 2004 and later rebranded to scenestr in 2014, also changing from weekly to a monthly schedule. In 2015 they launched in Adelaide, Sydney in 2016, Perth in 2017, and relaunched in Melbourne in 2018. In 2021 they claimed to be the only national street press group.

Other publications included Australian Musician, and Music Feeds.

== Distribution numbers ==
The number of copies each street press distributed was audited by the Audited Media Association of Australia (AMAA) through their CAB brand which verifies and provides distribution data to media companies. Street press magazines would report their weekly distribution numbers as CAB audited, and would occasionally call each other out over displaying their numbers incorrectly. By 2020 no titles reported CAB audited data anymore, and instead displayed rounded numbers on their websites or inside each magazine, if at all.

Title	2009 Distributed (CAB Audit)	2009 Outlets	2020 Distributed	2020 Outlets	References
Inpress	33,348	1000			
The Drum Media (Sydney)	34,312	850			
The Drum Media (Perth)	25,318	900			
Time Off	22,218	800			
Rip It Up	12,000	800			
Beat	34,000+	1800	n/a	32,000+	
The Brag	30,000+	n/a	n/a	n/a	
Mixdown*	25,000	1500+	32,000+	1750+	
Scene / Scenestr*	n/a	1,100+	60,000		
The Music*			n/a	n/a	

- denotes national title

== COVID-19 pandemic impact ==
In 2020, during Australia's lockdown period, due to COVID-19, most street presses stopped printing and moved completely online.

In Melbourne, Beat had moved to a fortnightly schedule in 2019. Following issue #1695's publication on March 11, 2020 Beat paused their print edition until in May 2022 editor when Lucas Radbourne announced the print issue had returned, and was available freely again as a monthly magazine.

In Sydney, The Brag also ceased publication in March 2020. But while most street press did so without a formal announcement, The Brag released a statement in February of their coming closure.

March 2020 was also the date of The Music’s most recent issue, and in October 2021, Handshake Media (previously Street Press Australia) announced they had sold The Music to SGC Media, owners of online music titles Purple Sneakers and Country Town. Time Off was separately sold to Sean Sennett, who had run the magazine through the 1990s, with plans to relaunch the magazine in 2022.

scenestr reported in October 2021 they were the "largest – and only remaining – street press group in Australia", and had returned to printing copies of their magazine in mid-2020 in five states and territories "where COVID and prevailing conditions have permitted". They continue to be published in 2022.

Mixdown has continued to be printed bi-monthly by Furst Media and made available nationally. They published their 318th issue in December 2021.

Elsewhere, BMA is still being published fortnightly in Canberra and is the longest consecutively running street press which is still in print in Australia.

== See also ==
- Music magazines published in Australia
