= Sounds Australia =

Music organisation in Australia

- Founded: 2009
- Headquarters: Sydney, Australia
- Key people: Millie Millgate (Executive Producer)
- Website: soundsaustralia.com.au

Sounds Australia is an Australian organisation established to assist Australian musicians become established overseas.

== History ==
Formed in 2009, Sounds Australia began as an initiative of the Australia Council for the Arts, APRA AMCOS, and the federal government. It has assisted artists such as Flume, Chet Faker, Gossling, and Courtney Barnett find greater impact outside of Australia.

Initially Sounds Australia used funding to support musicians in attending showcase conference events in North America, the UK and Europe, such as South by South West (SXSW), and in their first ten years assisted approximately 1,600 Australian artists to attend over 70 events, in 23 countries. They have also led programs to support non-musicians, and in 2017 Sounds Australia received funding from the Department of Foreign Affairs and Trade to visit South America with a delegation of Australian music industry figures to determine opportunities for Australian music.

In January 2020, publisher and live music promoter Larry Heath was appointed associate producer at Sounds Australia, at the same time as Indigenous singer-songwriter and arts administrator Leah Flanagan joined the team as First Nations export producer. Heath had previously collaborated with the team at Sounds Australia, including co-presenting "Jet Lag Sessions" at a conference in New York City from 2011 to 2013. Heath's first work at Sounds Australia was attending the Folk Alliance International in New Orleans. Flanagan's role entails attending key international events such as SXSW, The Great Escape Festival, Folk Alliance International, and WOMEX, as well as establishing an international bursary program for Indigenous artists. Her first assignment in the role was attending the International Indigenous Music Summit (Note: Name per website.) in New Orleans.

In March 2020, following the cancellation of SXSW, Sounds Australia organised a live stream event featuring artists like Alex the Astronaut, Kota Banks, and Cable Ties, but that too was cancelled due to the COVID-19 pandemic. As the pandemic continued, in 2021 Sounds Australia presented a showcase at an online SXSW and assisted musicians to access exit permits, allowing acts like Middle Kids and Tame Impala to leave Australia to fulfil touring obligations overseas.

== Funding ==
In 2015 the government made changes to their funding which led to uncertainty over the organisation's future, with their funding due to run out on December 31, 2016. In November 2016 Sounds Australia announced the government had committed to fund them for the next four years, with funding also contributed by other organisations.

They received further funding from ARIA in 2020.
