= APRA AMCOS =

Copyright collective in Australia and New Zealand

- Founded: APRA: 1926; AMCOS: 1979
- Headquarters: Sydney, Australia
- Key people: Dean Ormston (Chief Executive)
- Revenue: ▲$471.8m (2018/19); ▲$420.2m (2017/18); ▲$386.6m (2016/17)
- Members: 100,000+ songwriter, composer and publisher members
- Website: www.apraamcos.com.au

APRA AMCOS consists of Australasian Performing Right Association (APRA) and Australasian Mechanical Copyright Owners Society (AMCOS), both copyright management organisations or copyright collectives which jointly represent over 100,000 songwriters, composers and music publishers in Australia and New Zealand. The two organisations work together to license public performances and administer performance, communication and reproduction rights on behalf of their members, who are creators of musical works, aiming to ensure fair payments to members and to defend their rights under the Australian Copyright Act (1968).

APRA, which formed in 1926, represents songwriters, composers, and music publishers, providing businesses with a range of licences to use copyrighted music. This covers music that is communicated or performed publicly including on radio, television, online, live gigs in pubs and clubs etc. APRA distributes the royalties from these licence fees back to their composer, songwriter and music publisher members and overseas affiliates.

AMCOS, which formed in 1979, is responsible for licensing musical works to third parties who reproduce music via CD, DVD, vinyl recording, downloading, streaming or other digital means of reproduction, issuing what are known as mechanical rights and distributing mechanical royalties to writers and publishers of music and overseas affiliates.

In 1997 the two societies formed an alliance; since then, APRA has managed the day-to-day operations of the AMCOS business, but each has its own board of directors, elected from and by their own membership. They jointly present the APRA Awards each year.

== Description ==
The associations' national and NSW/ACT state/territory offices are located in Sydney, and the New Zealand office in Auckland. There are state/territory offices in Melbourne (for Victoria and Tasmania); Brisbane, Queensland; Adelaide, South Australia; Perth, Western Australia; and Darwin, Northern Territory. There are also international representatives in London, UK, Nashville, Tennessee, Los Angeles and New York.

APRA is a member and AMCOS associate member of the International Confederation of Societies of Authors and Composers (CISAC), and AMCOS is a member of the Bureau International de l'Edition Mécanique (BIEM), the international mechanical rights coordinating organisation.

APRA AMCOS adheres to a voluntary Code of Conduct for Collecting Societies which was introduced in 2002.

== How it works ==
It can be difficult or almost impossible to license copyright on an individual basis. The composer of the music, upon joining APRA, assigns their performing and communication right to the organisation. They can also choose whether or not they want AMCOS to administer their reproduction right (excluding print music) including for what purposes. By acting as a link between the users and creators of copyright material, collecting societies like APRA and AMCOS provide a simple means for assisting users to comply with their copyright obligations as well as ensuring that the creators or copyright owners are paid for the use of their work.

== History ==
=== APRA ===
APRA was established in 1926 by a number of companies, to represent the interests of Australasian music copyright holders, and to manage the performance and communication rights of its members. According to the Copyright Act, public performances of music include music played in pubs, clubs, fitness clubs, shops, cinemas, or at festivals, whether performed live, from radio or television. Communication of music covers music broadcast by TV or radio broadcasters, or accessed via the internet.

In 1929, commercial radio broadcasters in Sydney and Melbourne paid APRA £7 a week for royalties, with music broadcasts limited to 66 hours a week. This arrangement broke down in 1931, with APRA banning the playing of records on air. The Australian Federation of Commercial Broadcasting Stations was established in that year to resolve royalty and copyright related issues and as a result, member broadcasters agreed to pay a fixed sum for broadcasting rights.

With the introduction of the Australian Copyright Act 1968, APRA extended its services to any Australian business with copyright obligations. Demand for the service increased steadily over the following thirty years and by 2005, APRA represented the interests of 28,000 members within Australasia, and about two million creative artists and publishers from elsewhere in the world, and gathered $146 million in royalty payments, of which $127 million was distributed to copyright holders.

Today the Association provides businesses with a range of licences to use copyrighted music with APRA monitoring radio and television stations, concert promoters and cinemas in particular.

=== AMCOS ===
The Australasian Mechanical Copyright Owners Society Limited (AMCOS) was established in 1979 to manage mechanical royalties, i.e. the reproduction or copying and storage of music in any format. These royalties are generated each time "an original musical work is licensed by a third party and commercially reproduced or sold", whether on CD, DVD or vinyl recordings, music downloads or via streaming services. Thus the licensors include all major and independent record labels as well as digital service providers (DSPs) such as Apple Music and Spotify, and schools.

According to the Copyright Act, reproduction of music entails the making of any type of copy of a work, whether recorded on a CD recording, video or DVD, used as a mobile phone ring tone, digitally downloaded, or used in any audiovisual and broadcast material.

=== 1997: Alliance ===
Since 1997 the two societies formed a collaboration representing composers and lyricists, to provide "a one-stop service to music creators and music customers." As of August 2019 The two organisations jointly host their website, named APRA AMCOS.

=== 21st century ===
In 2004, APRA appointed an Indigenous Project Officer. The Australia Council for the Arts commissioned APRA AMCOS to undertake an audit of support infrastructure for Indigenous music in Australia, which will be used as a guide for the Australia Council and other agencies responsible for policy development and funding of Indigenous music.

In 2008 and 2009, APRA supported aggressive new copyright law in New Zealand, including punishment of persons accused but not proven to be infringing copyright. This position was opposed by artists and APRA members.

In 2009, Sounds Australia was created as a joint initiative of the Australia Council and APRA AMCOS. Sounds Australia is "a joint partnership between the Australian Council of the Arts, APRA AMCOS, the Australian Government, ARIA, the PPCA and state government agencies", which promotes and showcases Australian music around the globe.

In 2019, APRA AMCOS was a partner in the production of a report entitled Born global: Australian music exports, published by the Australia Council. Also in 2019, APRA AMCOS joined the Phonographic Performance Company of Australia (PPCA) to create OneMusic Australia, a joint licensing initiative.

== APRA Awards ==
In Australia, APRA AMCOS hosts a number of awards to honour achievements by local songwriters, including the APRA Music Awards, the Art Music Awards for classical music (in association with the Australian Music Centre), and the Screen Music Awards (in association with the Australian Guild of Screen Composers).

In New Zealand, the annual Silver Scroll is awarded by an anonymous judging panel to the year's best-written song on commercial release. Also awarded are the songs receiving the most airplay in New Zealand and overseas for the year.

== APRA billion streams list ==
The APRA billion streams list was established in 2019 by APRA AMCOS to acknowledge Australasian songwriters whose works have achieved one billion (1,000,000,000) streams on various services.

== Live Music Office ==
The Live Music Office was set up by the Federal Government and APRA AMCOS in order to develop a coordinated policy response to challenges facing the Australian live music industry. It advocates for better policies, strategies, and regulation. The office is housed within the APRA AMCOS building, and is funded by APRA AMCOS, the federal government, and Creative Australia. It is housed within their Sydney office.

== See also ==
- Performing Right Society – the reciprocal society serving the United Kingdom
