= Street press =

Street press is a type of publishing, between zines and magazines/newspapers in terms of distribution, content and audience. They are particularly prolific in Australia, especially music street press, although there are also some examples from Europe and North America..

Street press publications are usually available free to the reader. They are distributed by being made available to passers-by at locations such as restaurants, cafes, bars, clubs, live music venues, community centres and record stores.

To financially support themselves, street press publications usually take on more advertisements and sponsorship than other forms of media. Most street press publications are printed on low-quality newspaper stock to reduce costs. Some of the bigger publications print their covers and first few pages in colour, a rarer few use glossy paper for their cover. Virtually none of them print more than a couple of pages in colour. The size varies widely, some are printed in broadsheet format, some in tabloid format, and some in magazine-sized format. Non-standard paper sizes are also common, especially in the more obscure publications.

Street press publications are usually also more professional in appearance and composition than zines, with established business structures and relatively mainstream content. Street press publications tend to have more mainstream, broad-appeal subject matter than zines so they can attract sponsors, and increase readership.

Street press publications can cover a wide variety of topics, many are focused upon specific subject matter of a target audience. Common topics include culture or entertainment topics, such independent or alternative music. Other niche publications might involve political satire, gay and/or lesbian issues, and film.

Community newspapers, delivered to households, usually weekly, which consist primarily of localised news, do not fall into this category. Such newspapers often resemble conventional newspapers focused on local content. In addition, street press usually covers only a specific area of interest, whereas community newspapers might cover a wide variety of topics.
