= Graham Ross (musician) =

British conductor and composer (born 1985)

- Born: 29 April 1985 (age 41); Surrey, England
- Education: Clare College, Cambridge; Royal College of Music
- Occupations: Conductor, composer
- Website: www.grahamross.com

Graham Ross (born 29 April 1985) is a British conductor and composer. Since 2010 he has been the director of Choir of Clare College, Cambridge.

== Early life and education ==
Ross began his training as a treble, pianist, organist and violinist. He read music at Clare College, Cambridge, studying composition with Giles Swayne, and conducting at London's Royal College of Music, studying with Peter Stark and Robin O'Neill. In 2004, whilst at Cambridge, he co-founded The Dmitri Ensemble, a performing group based around a string ensemble, of which he is Principal Conductor. Ross held a conducting scholarship with the London Symphony Chorus from 2008 to 2009.

== Conductor ==
From 2008 to 2010 Ross was Musical Director of Concordia Chamber Choir and Kingston Choral Society. In 2010, he made his BBC Proms debut, with opera work taking him to Jerusalem, Aldeburgh, and Musique-Cordiale, Provence. Since 2013 he has been principal conductor at the Musique-Cordiale International Festival in the Pays de Fayence, France each August and at its UK concerts in Kent each autumn.

Ross has been Assistant Conductor and Chorus Master for Sir Roger Norrington, Diego Masson, Edward Gardner, Sir Mark Elder, Ivor Bolton, Richard Tognetti, Lars Ulrik Mortensen, Vladimir Jurowski and Sir Colin Davis.

=== Choir of Clare College, Cambridge ===
Since 2010 he has directed the Choir of Clare College, Cambridge, with whom he has toured across Europe, the United States of America, Asia and Australia, including performances at Washington's Library of Congress and Sydney Opera House. In the role he has established the Clare College Masterclass Series, Friends of Clare Music scheme and the Clare Choir Alumni Association. In 2016 he appointed the college's first female organ scholar.

=== Guest conductor ===
Ross has conducted the Aalborg Symphony Orchestra, Ars Nova Copenhagen, Aurora Orchestra, Australian Chamber Orchestra, BBC Concert Orchestra, BBC Singers, Danish National Vocal Ensemble, Gothenburg Symphony Orchestra, London Mozart Players, London Philharmonic Orchestra, Malaysian Philharmonic Orchestra, Orchestra of the Age of Enlightenment, Set Norske Blåseenemble (Norwegian Wind Ensemble) and Southbank Sinfonia.

He has worked with soloists including Raphael Wallfisch, Richard Tognetti, Jennifer Pike, Laura van der Heijden and Guy Johnston.

=== Premiere recordings and performances ===
Ross has conducted world premiere recordings by James MacMillan, Giles Swayne, Judith Bingham, Nico Muhly, Brett Dean, Matthew Martin and Imogen Holst, and premiere performances of works by Toby Hession, John Rutter, Cecilia McDowall, Gabriel Jackson, Jocelyn Pook and others.

=== Recordings ===
Ross's discography includes recordings with The Dmitri Ensemble and the Choir of Clare College, Cambridge, for Naxos Records and, since 2010, Harmonia Mundi USA.

A selection of recordings by Graham Ross
Year	Album	Label	Artists
2009	James MacMillan: Seven Last Words from the Cross	Naxos	The Dimitri Ensemble
2010	Stabat Mater: The Silent Land	Naxos	The Dimitri Ensemble, Raphael Wallfisch
2011	Judith Bingham: Organ Music	Naxos	Tom Winpenny, The Dimitri Ensemble
2012	Imogen Holst: Choral Works	Harmonia Mundi	Choir of Clare College, Cambridge, The Dimitri Ensemble
2013	Veni Emmanuel: Music for Advent	Harmonia Mundi	Choir of Clare College, Cambridge
2014	Lux de caelo: Music for Christmas	Harmonia Mundi	Choir of Clare College, Cambridge, The Dimitri Ensemble
2014	Stabat Mater Dolorosa: Music for Passiontide	Harmonia Mundi	Choir of Clare College, Cambridge
2015	Ascendit Deus: Music for Ascensiontide & Pentecost	Harmonia Mundi	Choir of Clare College, Cambridge and The Dimitri Ensemble
2015	Chamber Symphonies: Shostakovich, Rudolf Barshai	Harmonia Mundi	The Dimitri Ensemble
2015	Requiem: Music for All Saints and All Souls	Harmonia Mundi	Choir of Clare College, Cambridge
2016	Cantica Sacra: Lydia Kakabadse	Divine Art	Choir of Clare College, Cambridge
2016	Remembrance: Duruflé, Tavener, Elgar	Harmonia Mundi	Choir of Clare College, Cambridge
2016	Haec Dies: Music for Easter	Harmonia Mundi	Choir of Clare College, Cambridge, Matthew Jorysz
2016	Mater ora folium: Music for Epiphany	Harmonia Mundi	Choir of Clare College, Cambridge, Michael Papadopoulos
2016	Music at Westminster: From Tallis to Britten	Harmonia Mundi	Choir of Clare College, Cambridge
2017	Pange lingua: Music for Corpus Christi	Harmonia Mundi	Choir of Clare College, Cambridge
2017	Reformation 1517-2017	Harmonia Mundi	Choir of Clare College, Cambridge, Clare Baroque Ensemble, Margaret Faultless
2018	O lux Beata Trinitas: Music for Trinity and Ordinary	Harmonia Mundi	Choir of Clare College, Cambridge
2020	A Ceremony of Carols: with Bridge, Holst, Ireland	Harmonia Mundi	Choir of Clare College, Cambridge, Carter Eleanor, Ashley Show, Tanya Houghton
2020	Arvo Pärt: Pēteris Vasks, James MacMillan	Harmonia Mundi	Choir of Clare College, Cambridge, The Dimitri Ensemble
2022	Iceland, The Eternal Music: S. Saevarsson, J. Leifs, A. Thorvaldsdóttir	Harmonia Mundi	Choir of Clare College, Cambridge, The Dimitri Ensemble, Carolyn Sampson
2023	Rolling River: American Choral	Harmonia Mundi	Choir of Clare College, Cambridge, Iestyn Davies
2023	Vidi Speciosam	Signum Classics	The Bevan Family Consort

== Awards and recognition ==
- Rising Star in BBC Music Magazine,
- Gramophone Award nomination
- Diapason d'Or
- Le Choix de France Musique
- Editor's Choice, Gramophone
- Editor's Choice, BBC Music Magazine
- 2019 - Made an Honorary Fellow the University of Macau, where he was presented with a Half Moon Award for the Arts

== Composer ==
As a composer, Ross has written over one hundred works for a wide variety of genres that have been broadcast and performed by Aurora Orchestra, Australian Chamber Orchestra, Barry Humphries, BBC Concert Orchestra, saxophonist Anthony Brown, City of London Sinfonia, Covent Garden Chamber Orchestra, National Youth Choir of Great Britain, Park Lane Group, Patricia Rozario, Solstice Quartet, and many choirs in the UK.

He is published by Novello & Co, Oxford University Press, Encore Publications and the Associated Board of the Royal Schools of Music.

== Other work ==
Ross is Artistic Director of Fringe in the Fen, a biennial music and arts festival in Fenstanton, Cambridgeshire, raising funds for Macmillan Cancer Support. He is a Patron of the London Festival of Contemporary Church Music. Ross has worked extensively in outreach projects, including projects for Wigmore Hall, BBC Singers, Sue Perkins, and Turtle Song, a song-writing project with Alzheimer's and dementia sufferers for English Touring Opera. In 2015, he represented the UK as adjudicator for the Malta International Choir Festival. In 2017 he was one of 50 signatories on a letter asking for a reversal of a ban on external hirers of St Sepulchre-without-Newgate, the "Musician's Church".

== See also ==
- Gramophone magazine interview, December 2016, p16-18
- Choir and Organ magazine interview, January 2020, p15-18
- Crosseyed Pianist interview, May 2020

Preceded by Timothy Brown	Director of Music, Clare College, Cambridge; 2010–	Succeeded by Incumbent
