= William Barton (musician) =

Australian Aboriginal didgeridoo player

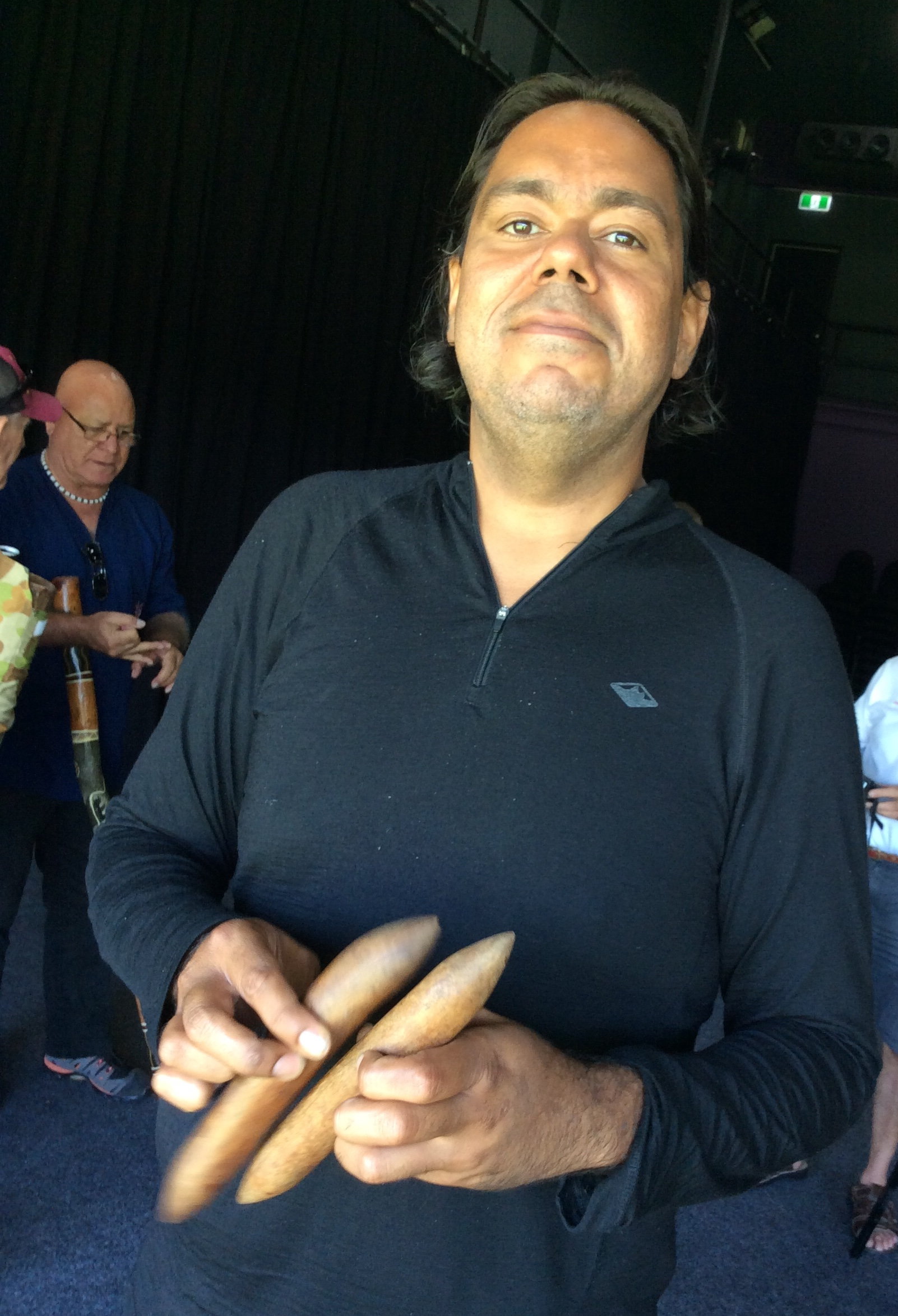
- Barton in 2018
- Born: 1980 or 1981 (age 45–46); Mount Isa, Queensland, Australia
- Occupations: Musician, didgeridoo player
- Website: www.williambarton.com.au

William Barton (born 1980 or 1981) is an Aboriginal Australian multi-instrumentalist, composer, producer, and vocalist, known principally for his didgeridoo (yidaki) playing, particularly with classical orchestras. He is also a singer-songwriter and composer.

== Early life and education ==
William Barton was born in 1980 or 1981 in Mount Isa, Queensland. From the Roper River area, he is a Kalkadunga man, and his mother, Delmae, is a poet and singer.

He learned to play didgeridoo at the age of 11 from Uncle Arthur Peterson, an elder who spoke several languages. He inherited his uncle's didgeridoo upon his death, to continue the culture.

== Career ==
Barton moved to Brisbane at the age of 17 (around 1997), where he became a soloist with the Queensland Symphony Orchestra. During this time, he also performed with his mother, Delmae, as the duo "Dreamtime Spirits". He became the Queensland Symphony Orchestra's first artist-in-residence. In this role, he travelled to schools and performed with the orchestra. With the orchestra, he played several of composer Peter Sculthorpe's works, including performances of Earth Cry, and for the 2003 CD release Songs of Sea and Sky. He toured to Japan and New Zealand performing Earth Cry and Mangrove, which he also performed at Colorado Music Festival.

Barton has become not only an accomplished yidaki player, but also a composer, producer, multi-instrumentalist, and vocalist. He sang with the Australian Chamber Orchestra on the soundtrack of Jennifer Peedom's 2021 film River, for which he won the AACTA Award for Best Original Score in a Documentary along with composer Richard Tognetti and Piers Burbrook de Vere in 2022.

Barton has said, "The yidaki embodies everything of the land, because it's from the tree, it's the breath of life and the land, of sustenance to us as human beings. It embodies the history of those old trees. The yidaki has memories, it's the breath of our ancestors, particularly when the instrument is passed on physically from one person to the next". He has expressed his wish "to take the oldest culture in the world and blend it with Europe's rich musical legacy".

=== Performances ===
Barton has appeared at music festivals around the world and has also recorded a number of orchestral works. He featured in Peter Sculthorpe's Requiem, a major work for orchestra, chorus and didgeridoo, which premiered the Adelaide Festival of Arts in 2004 with the Adelaide Symphony Orchestra and Adelaide Voices conducted by Richard Mills. This was reputedly the first time a didgeridoo has featured in a full symphonic work. The work has since been performed in the UK at The Lichfield Festival with The City of Birmingham Symphony Orchestra and Birmingham's choir Ex Cathedra, conducted by Jeffrey Skidmore.

In May 2004, ABC Classics released Songs of Sea and Sky, an album of works by Peter Sculthorpe revised for didgeridoo and orchestra. The work was performed by Barton and the Queensland Orchestra conducted by Michael Christie.

In 2004 he, along with poet Samuel Wagan Watson and composer Stephen Leek, devised the operatic piece "Die dunkle erde", for the Brisbane Festival. The piece blended German Gothic horror and Aboriginal culture, and was performed by Watson and Barton on The Music Show in 2011.

In 2005, Barton performed at the 90th anniversary Gallipoli at ANZAC Cove, Turkey, and in debut concerts with the London Philharmonic Orchestra at Royal Festival Hall in London. In 2005/2006, Barton collaborated with orchestras, choral directors and composers in Australia, America and Europe, developing new commissions for the didgeridoo.

On 5 November 2014, Barton performed at the memorial service for former Prime Minister Gough Whitlam in the Sydney Town Hall.

In 2015, Barton performed at the 100th anniversary opening Gallipoli at ANZAC Cove, Turkey for dawn service.

In 2019, Barton played with the Sydney Symphony Orchestra an orchestral rendition of Down Under at the memorial service for former Prime Minister Bob Hawke at the Sydney Opera House.

Barton performed at the 2023 AFL Grand Final, along with Melbourne-based Indigenous singer-songwriter Jess Hitchcock.

In February 2026, Barton is touring with Britain's Brodsky Quartet, performing works which include Andrew Ford's Eden Ablaze, which he wrote during the 2019 Australian bushfires; and Peter Sculthorpe's Jabiru Dreaming; Janáček's Intimate Letters; selections from Henry Purcell and Igor Stravinsky; and some of Barton's own compositions. On 25 February they will perform at the Melbourne Recital Centre in Melbourne, and on 28 February 2026, at the Adelaide Festival. They will then continue to perform in Austria, Germany, and the UK, finishing in Bristol in April 2026.

He has also performed with the Berlin Philharmonic under Sir Simon Rattle.

In 2026, he performed "Confide in Me" with Kylie Minogue at the AFL Grand Final.

== Media appearances ==
Barton featured on the ABC television program, Australian Story in 2007.

In 2011, he performed and was interviewed by Andrew Ford on The Music Show, along with poet Samuel Wagan Watson.

== Discography ==
=== Albums ===
Title	Details
Songs of Sky and Sea (with Peter Sculthorpe, Michael Christie and the Queensland Orchestra)	Release date: 2004; Label: ABC Classics (476 192-1); Formats: CD
Earth Cry / Piano Concerto (with Peter Sculthorpe, Tamara Anna Cislowska, New Zealand Symphony Orchestra and James Judd)	Release date: 2004; Label: Naxos (8.557382); Formats: CD
The Journey	Release date: 2004; Label: William Barton; Formats: CD
Ancient Souls, Ancient Land (with Sean O'Boyle)	Release date: 2007; Label: William Barton; Formats: CD
Desert Stars Dancing (with Anthony Garcia)	Release date: 2010; Label: Vitamin (MMLL-003); Formats: CD
Kalkadungu - Music for Didjeridu And Orchestra	Release date: 2012; Label: ABC Classics (476 4834); Formats: CD
Birdsong at Dusk	Release date: 2014; Label: ABC Classics (481 0962); Formats: CD
The Art of the Didgeridoo (with Matthew Doyle)	Release date: 2015; Label: ABC Classics (481 1909); Formats: CD
Restless Dream (Bob Weatherall & Halfway with William Barton)	Release date: August 2021; Label: Halfway, ABC; Formats: CD, DD, streaming
Heartland (with Véronique Serret)	Release date: 22 July 2022; Label: Halfway, ABC (ABCL0017); Formats: CD, DD, streaming
History Has a Heartbeat (with Joseph Tawadros)	Release date: 12 August 2022; Label: Joseph Tawadros; Formats: CD, streaming
Gift - Our Breath of Life (with Omega Ensemble)	Release date: 18 October 2025; Label: ABC; Formats: digital, streaming

== Recognition and awards ==
In 2022 he was the co-winner of the AACTA Award for Best Original Score in a Documentary, along with Richard Tognetti and Piers Burbrook de Vere, for his work on the soundtrack of the 2021 film River.

In November 2022, Barton was named Queensland Australian of the Year.

In 2023, Barton become the first Indigenous artist to receive the Richard Gill Award for distinguished service to Australian music.

Barton was jointly selected with pianist Tamara Anna Cislowska for the 2004 Freedman Fellowship for Classical Music by the Music Council of Australia.

In 2004, he was awarded the Brisbane Lord Mayor's Young and Emerging Artists' Fellowship, and the following year he was a metropolitan finalist for the Suncorp Young Queenslander of the Year Award.

=== AIR Awards ===
The Australian Independent Record Awards (commonly known informally as AIR Awards) is an annual awards night to recognise, promote and celebrate the success of Australia's Independent Music sector.

Year	Nominee / work	Award	Result	Ref.
2023	Heartland (with Véronique Serret)	Best Independent Classical Album or EP	Won	
2026	Gift — Our Breath of Life (with Omega Ensemble)	Best Independent Classical Album or EP	Won	

=== APRA Music Awards ===
The APRA Awards are held in Australia and New Zealand by the Australasian Performing Right Association to recognise songwriting skills, sales and airplay performance by its members annually.

Year	Nominee / work	Award	Result	Ref.
2022	"Spirit Voice of the Enchanted Waters" from River (William Barton, Piers Burbrook de Vere & Richard Tognetti)	Best Original Song Composed for the Screen	Won	
2026	"The Spirit Shall Return" from Mystery Road: Origin	Best Original Song Composed for the Screen	Nominated	

=== ARIA Music Awards ===
The ARIA Music Awards is an annual awards ceremony that recognises excellence, innovation, and achievement across all genres of Australian music. They commenced in 1987.

Year	Nominee / work	Award	Result	Ref.
2004	Sculthorpe: Songs of Sea and Sky (with The Queensland Orchestra)	Best Classical Album	Nominated	
2012	Kalkadungu	Best Classical Album	Won	
2014	Birdsong at Dusk	Best World Music Album	Nominated	
2021	Restless Dream (with Bob Weatherall & Halfway)	Best World Music Album	Nominated	
2022	Heartland (with Véronique Serret)	Best World Music Album	Nominated	
2022	History Has a Heartbeat (with Joseph Tawadros)	Best World Music Album	Won	
2026	Gift – Our Breath of Life (with Omega Ensemble)	Best Classical Album	Won	

=== Art Music Awards ===
Year	Nominee / work	Award	Result	Ref.
2023	William Barton	Richard Gill Award for Distinguished Services to Australian Music	awarded	

=== Don Banks Music Award ===
The Don Banks Music Award was established in 1984 to publicly honour a senior artist of high distinction who has made an outstanding and sustained contribution to music in Australia. It was founded by the Australia Council in honour of Don Banks, Australian composer, performer and the first chair of its music board.

Year	Nominee / work	Award	Result
2021	William Barton	Don Banks Music Award	awarded

=== Environmental Music Prize ===
The Environmental Music Prize is a quest to find a theme song to inspire action on climate and conservation. It commenced in 2022.

Year	Nominee / work	Award	Result	Ref.
2022	"Your Country" (William Crighton featuring William Barton & Julieanne Crighton)	Environmental Music Prize	Nominated	

=== National Live Music Awards ===
The National Live Music Awards (NLMAs) commenced in 2016 to recognize contributions to the live music industry in Australia.

Year	Nominee / work	Award	Result	Ref.
2023	William Barton	Best Live Instrumentalist	Nominated	

=== Queensland Music Awards ===
The Queensland Music Awards (previously known as the Q Song Awards) are an annual awards ceremony celebrating Queensland's brightest emerging artists and established legends. They commenced in 2006.

Year	Nominee / work	Award	Result	Ref.
2023	"Kalkani"	Indigenous Award	Won	
