= River (2021 film) =

- Directed by: Jennifer Peedom; Joseph Nizeti
- Written by: Robert Macfarlane; Jennifer Peedom; Joseph Nizeti
- Produced by: Jo-Anne McGowan; Jennifer Peedom; John Smithson
- Narrated by: Willem Dafoe
- Cinematography: Yann Arthus-Bertrand; Ben Knight; Dan Lior; Peter McBride; Danny McGee; Renan Ozturk
- Edited by: Simon Njoo
- Music by: Richard Tognetti; William Barton; Piers Burbrook de Vere
- Production company: Stranger Than Fiction Films
- Distributed by: Greenwich Entertainment; Madman Entertainment; Dogwoof
- Release dates: 13 August 2021 (Melbourne International Film Festival); 24 March 2022 (Australia); 13 July 2022 (ABC)
- Running time: 75 min.
- Country: Australia
- Language: English

River is a 2021 Australian documentary film, co-written, co-produced and directed by Jennifer Peedom. It is a follow-up to Mountain.

== Cast ==
- Willem Dafoe, as the narrator

== Critical response ==
On review aggregator Rotten Tomatoes, the film has an approval rating of 88% based on 24 reviews. On Metacritic, the film has a weighted average score of 58 out of 100, based on 9 critics, indicating "Mixed or average reviews".

Sandra Hall from The Sydney Morning Herald gave the film four stars and called it "a hypnotic experience – and an audacious one – given the film’s stately pace and scorn for action, suspense and all the other conventional narrative devices." continuing "But it’s put together with such a finely tuned instinct for the sensuous power of the earth’s splendours that it’s very seductive."

Writing in the Austin Chronicle, Richard Whittaker gave 3 1/2 stars, concluding, "Yes, River flows in the wake of other documentaries, and some have called it redundant. But it is rather another drop in the flood of documentaries, and without all those drops, especially one so beautiful and challenging, there will never be any erosion of our antipathy to change. If the purpose of Mountain was to humble the viewer, then River is intended to quietly terrify us. Maybe that's exactly what we need."

Michael Hogan from The Telegraph gave the film one out of five stars, finishing "This wasn’t meditative enough to qualify as “Slow TV”, partly because neither Dafoe nor the musicians would pipe down. By the time the credits rolled on River, I wanted to throw myself into the nearest one."

== Awards ==
- 12th AACTA Awards
  - Best Feature Length Documentary - Jennifer Peedom, Joseph Nizeti, Jo-anne McGowan, John Smithson - won
  - Best Original Music Score in a Documentary - Richard Tognetti, William Barton, Piers Burbrook de Vere - won
  - Best Editing in a Documentary - Simon Njoo - nominated
  - Best Sound in a Documentary – Tara Webb, Robert Mackenzie - nominated
- 2022 ARIA Music Awards
  - Best Original Soundtrack, Cast or Show Album - Australian Chamber Orchestra and Richard Tognetti - won
