= Pieter Wispelwey =

Dutch cellist

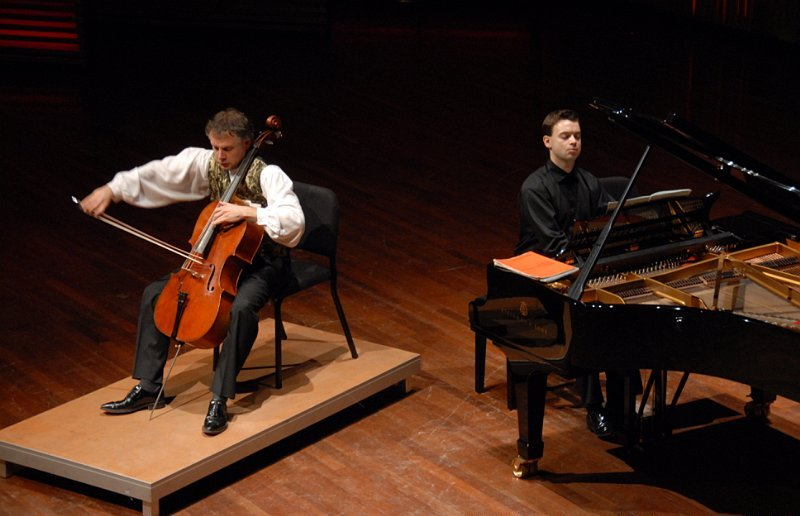
Pieter Wispelwey accompanied by Dejan Lazic, picture: Fai Ho

Pieter Wispelwey (born 25 September 1962) is a Dutch cellist. In 1992, he was the first cellist to receive the Netherlands Music Prize, a government-awarded prize given to the most promising young musician in the Netherlands. He has come to be regarded as one of the world's leading performers and interpreters of both baroque and modern cello works.

He plays a 1760 Giovanni Battista Guadagnini cello and a 1710 baroque cello by Pieter Rombouts.

== Early life ==
Pieter Wispelwey was born in Haarlem and grew up in Santpoort. From a very early age he was exposed to the sounds of his father's amateur string quartet when they rehearsed at the Wispelwey home. He began on the piano, but later took up the cello at age eight. Later on he took lessons from Dicky Boeke and Anner Bylsma in Amsterdam, followed by studies with Paul Katz in the US and William Pleeth in the UK.

== Career ==
His first recording with Channel Classics Records, the Bach Cello Suites, received considerable acclaim upon its release in 1990. He released two further recordings of the suites in 1998 (Channel Classics) and 2012 (Evil Penguin Records). The support of Channel Classics in the 1990s and 2000s enabled him to record his own choice of repertoire, with his own choice of artists and orchestras. This resulted in recordings of unusual repertoire, such as Franz Schubert violin sonatinas, Frédéric Chopin waltzes, mazurkas and preludes and the Bach Gamba sonatas played with his own personal instrumentations.

Wispelwey has appeared as a recitalist all over the world, including at the Concertgebouw (Amsterdam), Wigmore Hall (London), Châtelet (Paris), Teatro Colón (Buenos Aires) and Sydney Opera House. He has performed with many orchestras and ensembles, both with and without a conductor. Notable projects without conductor have been the touring and recording of the Schumann and Shostakovich cello concertos with the Australian Chamber Orchestra under Richard Tognetti. He has also appeared with the Rotterdam Philharmonic Orchestra, the BBC Symphony Orchestra, the RTÉ National Symphony Orchestra, Camerata Academica Salzburg, Mahler Chamber Orchestra and the Deutsche Kammerphilharmonie Bremen and others and has recorded with the Netherlands Philharmonic Orchestra and the Netherlands Radio Philharmonic.

== Playing style ==
Wispelwey is comfortable playing the modern cello with either metal or gut strings as well as the baroque four- and five-string cello, which allows him a repertoire ranging from Bach to Elliott Carter. Growing up exposed to gut strings as the norm like many others of his generation, Wispelwey developed a conviction that, under the right conditions, much of the 18th- and 19th-century string repertoire sounds superior when played on gut strings instead of metal. However, he is not a purist, and he plays on steel strings if conditions make it sound better than gut strings.

He has been praised for his "intelligent, penetrating musicianship and lyrical commitment," and Ivan Hewett, writer for the Telegraph and teacher at the Royal College of Music, likened him to a "master rhetorician."

== Personal life ==
Since the age of 19 he has resided in Amsterdam.
