= Matthew Jorysz =

English organist

- Born: 1992
- Genres: Classical/Organ/Choral
- Instrument(s): Organ, piano
- Labels: Harmonia Mundi, Orchid Classics

Matthew Jorysz (born 1992) is an English organist and pianist. He currently serves as sub-organist at Westminster Abbey.

== Education ==
Jorysz was an organ scholar at Salisbury Cathedral from 2011 to 2012 before studying music at Clare College, Cambridge, where he was the Sir William McKie organ scholar for the chapel choir under the directorship of Graham Ross. During this time he accompanied the choir in broadcasts and recordings, as well as on tours to Europe and the United States, including a performance at the Library of Congress.

== Career ==
Appointed as the organ scholar at Westminster Abbey in September 2015, Jorysz subsequently became the Abbey's assistant organist in January 2016, and was appointed sub-organist in September 2024. He played at the state funeral of Queen Elizabeth II in 2022 and at the coronation of Charles III and Camilla in 2023, performing the world premiere of Iain Farrington's Voices of the World.

== Discography ==
- Requiem: Music for All Saints & All Souls (Choir of Clare College, Cambridge).
- Ascendit Deus: Music for Ascensiontide & Pentecost (Choir of Clare College, Cambridge).
- Remembrance (Choir of Clare College, Cambridge).
- Haec dies: Music for Easter (Choir of Clare College, Cambridge).
- Sphinx (Hamish McLaren, countertenor; Matthew Jorysz, piano).
- Persian Love Songs (Hamish McLaren, countertenor; Matthew Jorysz, piano).
- The Coronation of Their Majesties King Charles III and Queen Camilla - The Official Album.
