= Parker Steel =

Parker Steel is a steel merchant with its headquarters in Canterbury in the southern English county of Kent. It operates principally across southern England.

Founded in 1904 by John Parker in Canterbury, Parker Steel began as an ironmonger (hardware) store in Canterbury City Centre at 11 The Parade. In 1923 John Parker was joined by his son, also called John, in the company, and it became John Parker and Son Ltd. A third generation of the Parker family, David Parker, joined the company in 1950, and remains chairman of the company today. His nephew, Guy Parker, has also joined Parker Steel, and is its managing director.

In 2007 Parker Steel bought Yeowart Steel Stockholders, based in Crawley in Sussex,

The company also operates a tool hire business and a car sales dealership on behalf of Mitsubishi Motors, and sponsors local events including the annual Canterbury Festival.
