= Musique-Cordiale =

Annual festival of classical music, song, oratorio and opera

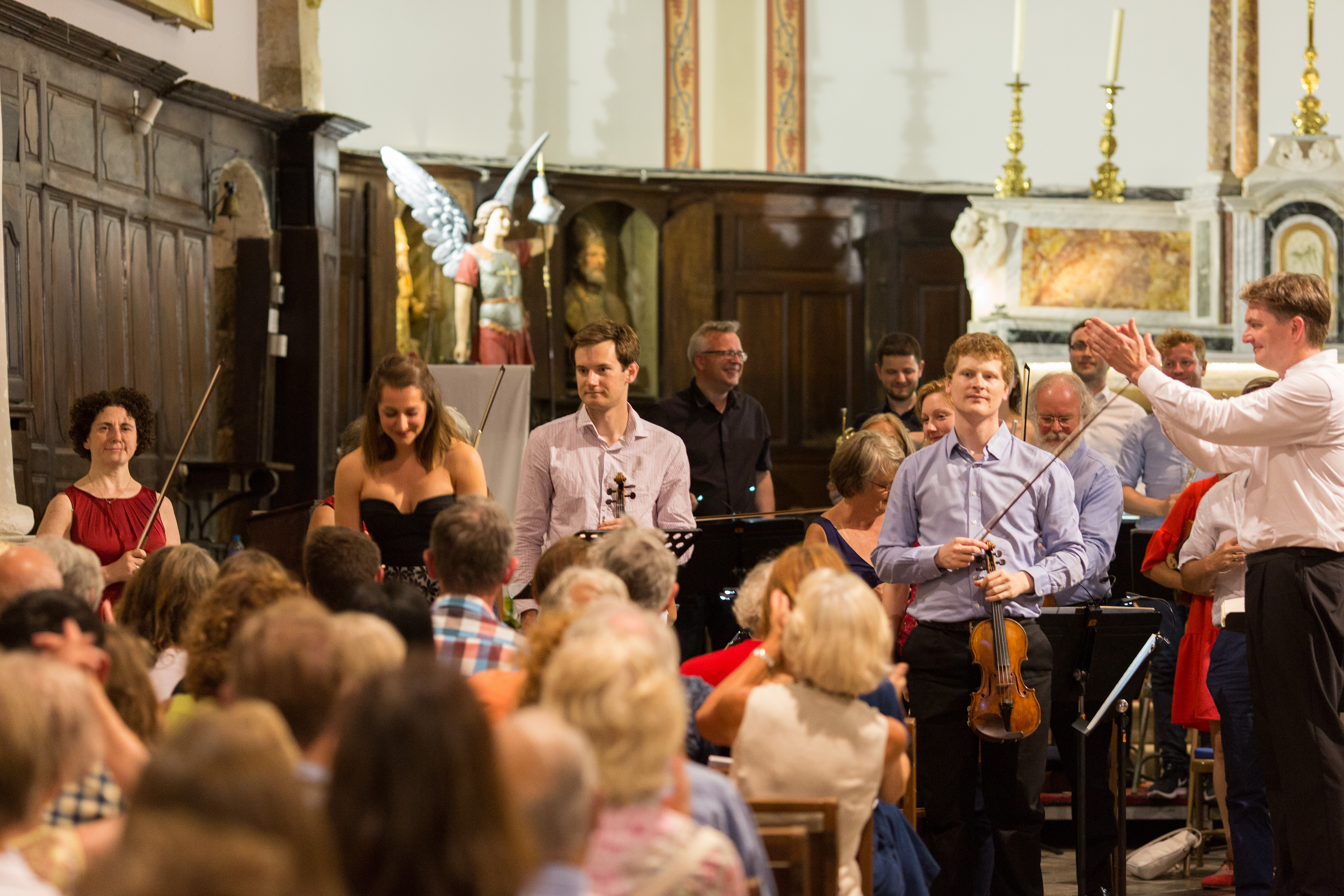
- Concert Bargemon 2016
- Genre: Classical music
- Dates: Jul, August, December
- Locations: Seillans, Pays de Fayence, South of France. Faversham, Doddington Place Gardens, Kent
- Years active: 2005 – present
- Founders: Pippa Pawlik
- Website: www.musique-cordiale.com

The Musique Cordiale International Festival & Academy is an annual festival of classical music, song, oratorio and opera, founded in 2005. It usually* takes place in hill towns (village perché) of the Pays de Fayence between Nice and Aix-en-Provence in the South of France in late July and during the first two weeks of August. The festival features up to 18 concerts including major choral and orchestral works, chamber ensembles, free lunchtime concerts and late night recitals in churches, chapels and in the open air. (* though in 2020, 2021 and 2022 it relocated to England as Musique-Cordiale in Kent because of pandemic restrictions and closed borders. In 2021, it took the form of just a week of concerts, mostly out of doors, in Faversham and Newnham and culminating in concerts in Doddington Place Gardens). This pattern of concerts only in Britain was repeated in 2022 (29 July to 3 August 2022, including several concerts in the restored old Faversham Assembly Rooms) with an additional concert on 4 June 2022 in Doddington Place Gardens to commemorate the Queen's 70th Jubilee. In past years, the festival has also included staged opera performances and jazz concerts. It is envisaged that future festivals will again take place in both Britain and France from 2023: the 2023 International Festival in Provence took place 3–12 August 2023 and the 2024 Festival is scheduled for 31 July – 10 August.

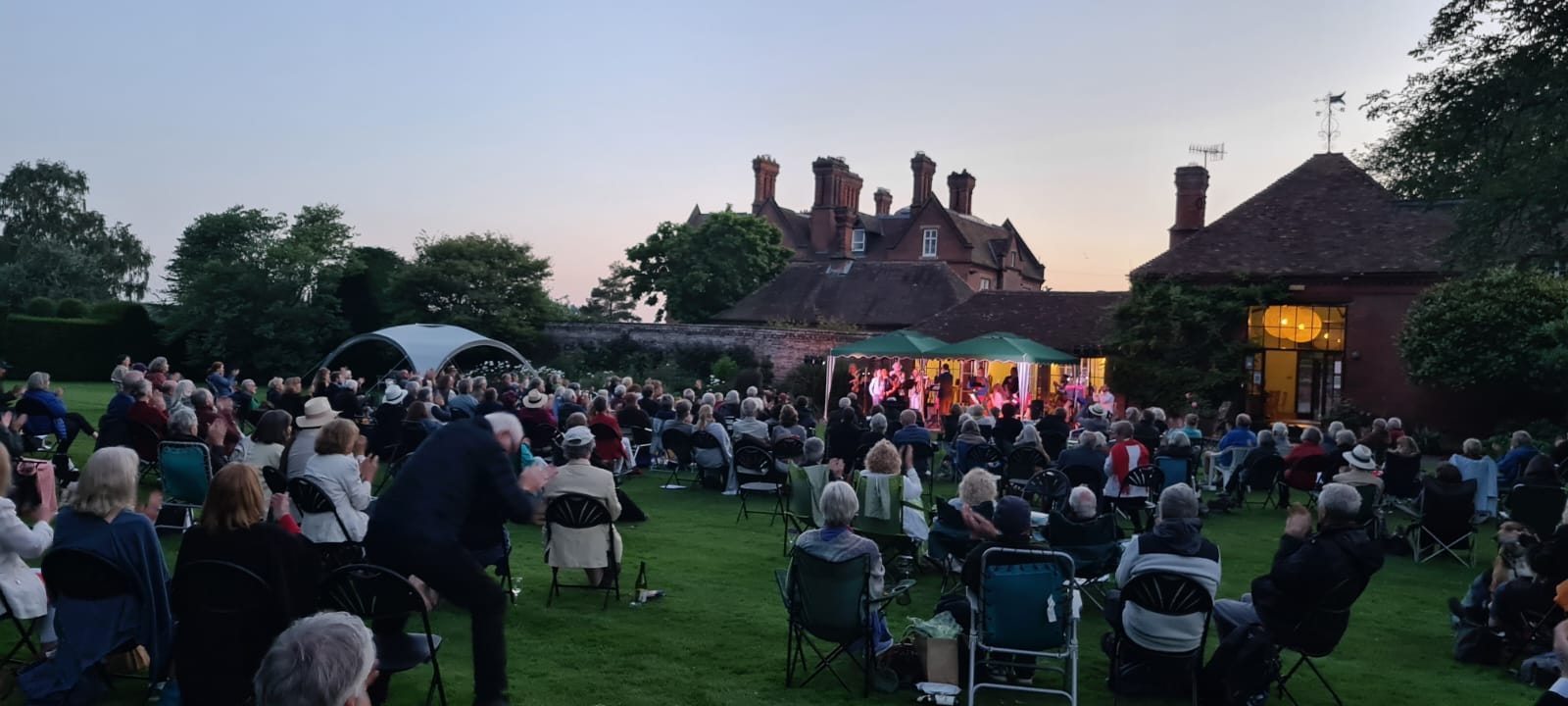
open-air Musique-Cordiale concert, Doddington Place, July 2022

In a spirit of entente cordiale, the festival draws together people of all ages and from many countries and is designed to encourage intercultural friendship and understanding through a shared involvement in music-making. A collection of over 100 singers and players, ranging in age from 15 to 75, assemble each year for a series of rehearsals and concerts. The 15th annual Musique Cordiale Festival took place from 5–17 August 2019. and there is a British offshoot, the Musique-Cordiale autumn weekend in Kent, also begun in 2005, which, in November 2019, featured 3 concerts in Faversham and Newnham, Kent, GB. The 16th annual festival, scheduled for 1–15 August 2020, had to be cancelled and all sums reimbursed to participants because of the COVID-19 crisis. A single small concert did take place in the Pays de Fayence during that period with an officially-limited audience. The choir and musicians were not able to travel to Seillans for rehearsals or any performances. But UK-based members of the Festival Choir did stage an open-air performance of the Brahms Requiem in Doddington Place Gardens in Kent, England on 13 September 2020 after 3 days of rehearsal - with only 4 hands on a keyboard for accompaniment - under the baton of music director, Graham Ross. International participation is likely to be possible in the Pays de Fayence in summer 2023 as the still-evolving pandemic and travel restrictions in Europe continue to ease. However, a week-long series of rehearsals and concerts in Kent, GB, many of them out-of-doors and/or socially-distanced, did occur, 29 July - 5 August 2021 and a full programme was performed, again only in Kent, in summer 2022. And a winter concert took place on 4 December 2021 in Faversham, including Handel's Dixit Dominus and Vivaldi Four Seasons. 2023 is the 19th year of concerts, relocated for 3 years but not interrupted by the pandemic.

Artistic director Pippa Pawlik, studied the violin at the Royal College of Music in London and played professionally in London and Switzerland. With two young children, she then changed direction and worked in music promotion with record companies, international orchestras, festivals and artists from all over the world. Pippa now lives and works in Kent, having relaunched her PR business with clients in America, Germany and the UK. She also acts as a mentor, offering musicians career guidance, inspiration and brainstorming strategies.

== Choir and orchestra ==
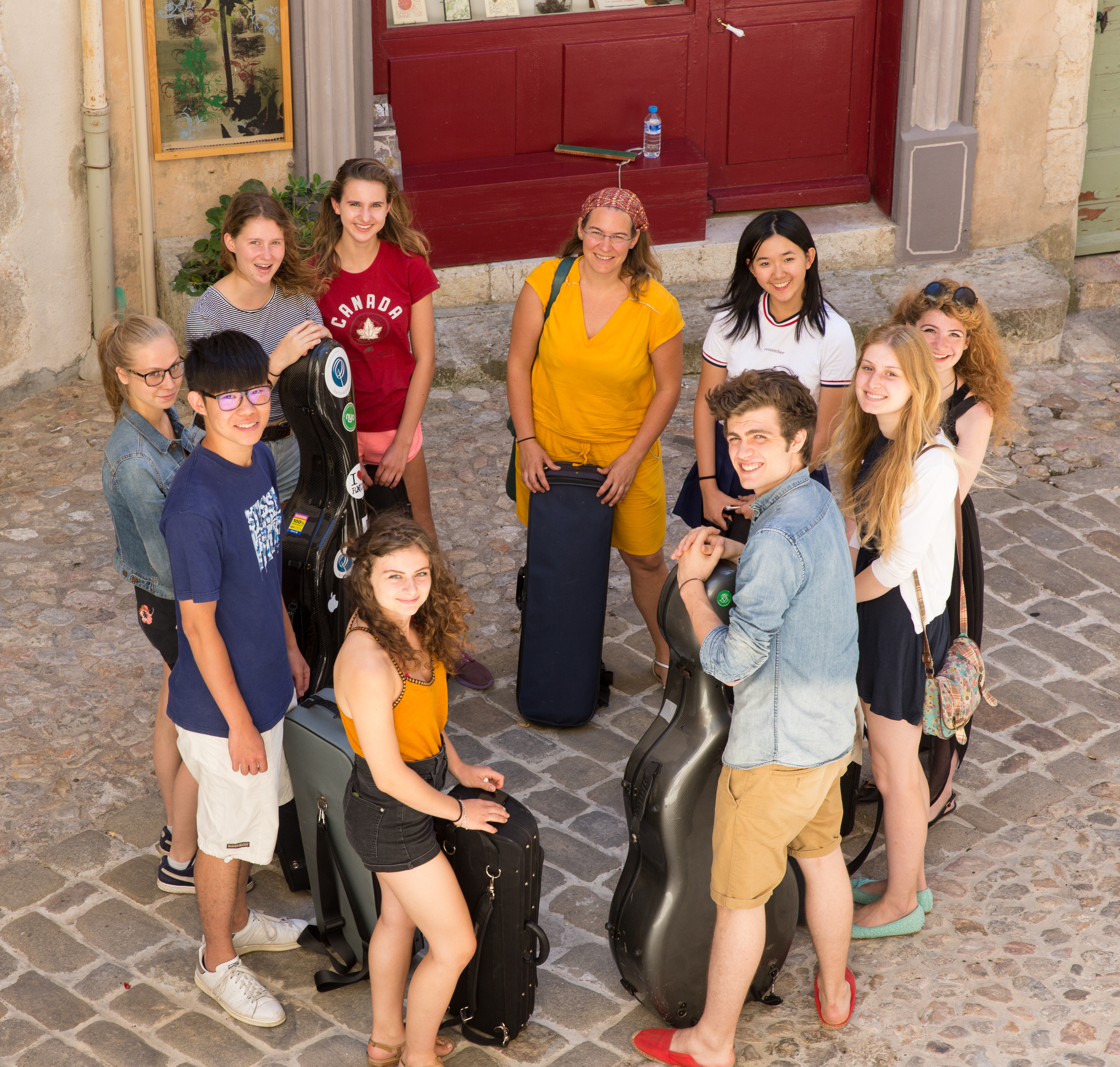
MC Academy 2016

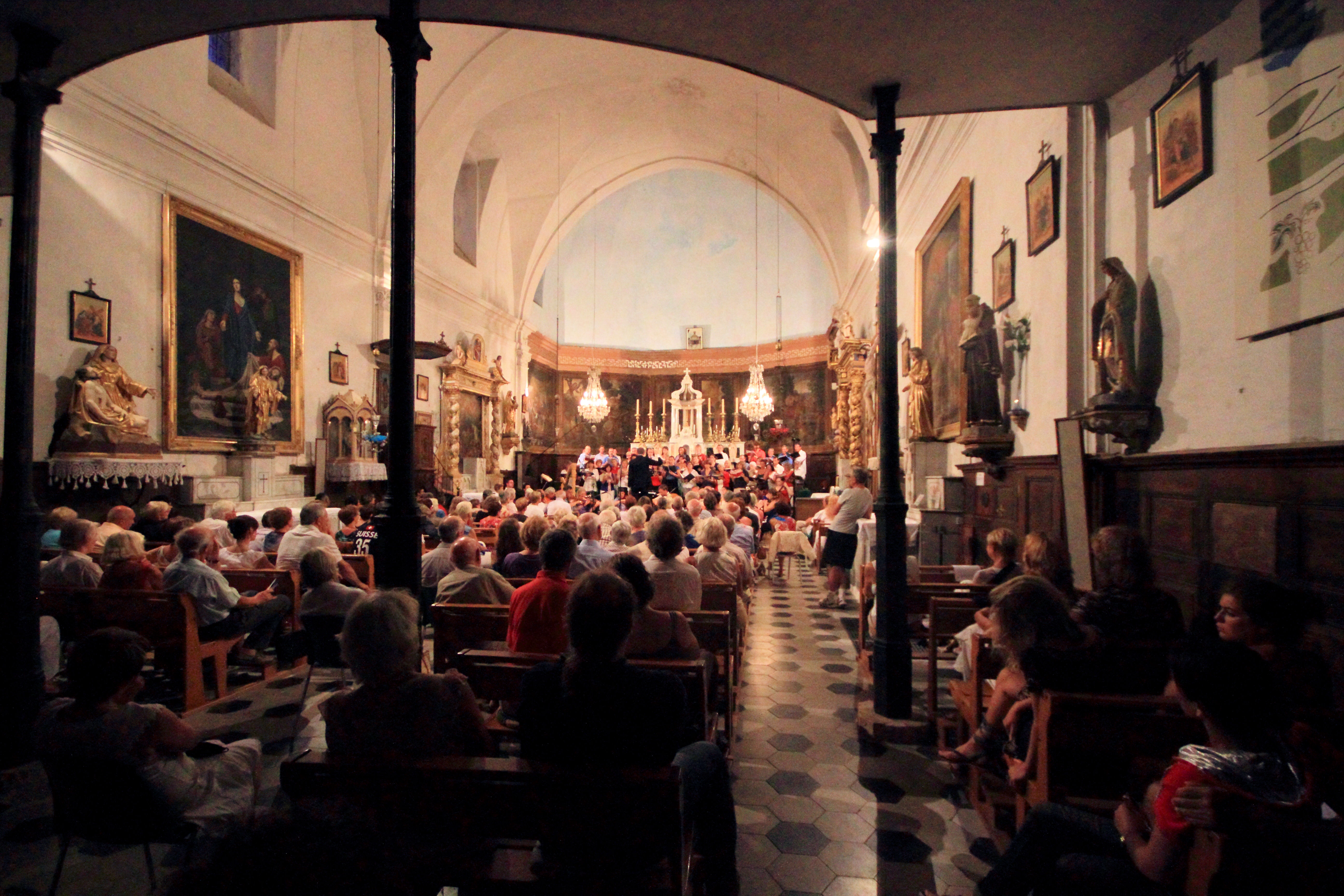
Concert in Bagnols-en-Foret, France

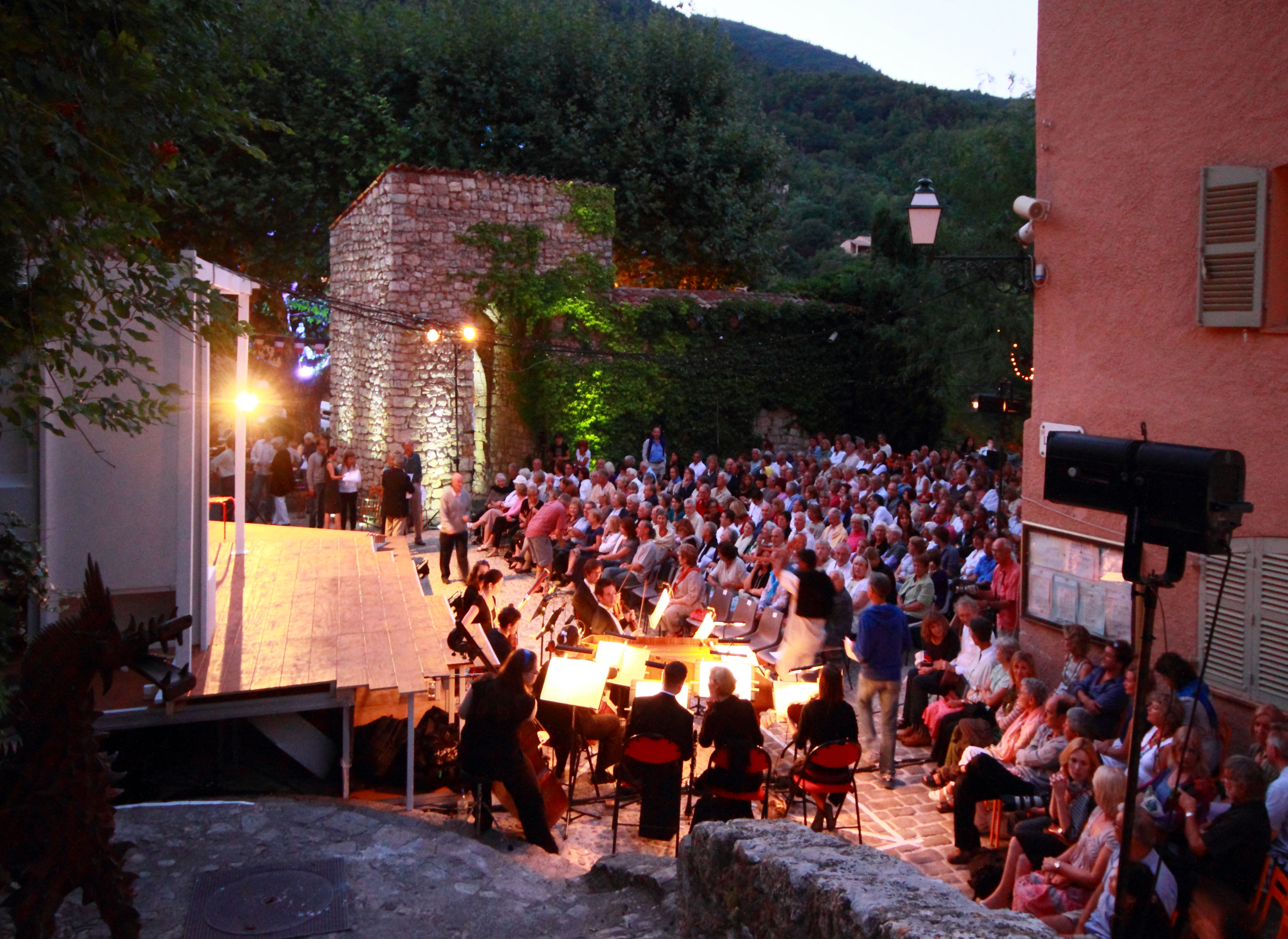
Opera in the Open Air

A choral tradition remains an integral part of Musique Cordiale and a major work for choir and orchestra closes the festival each year. The pan-European choir is made up of excellent amateur and professional singers from ensembles including The Bach Choir, the London Symphony Chorus, Groupe Vocal Arpège de Bordeaux and the Ensemble Equinox.

The Festival Orchestra is a multi-generational ensemble made up of young professionals and established musicians from orchestras including the San Francisco Symphony, LSO, the OAE, the Tonhalle Zurich and the Oslo Philharmonic. Musique Cordiale acts as a platform for soloists and orchestral players, offering them an opportunity to learn and perform works which they will later play on the international stage. Its academy offers 6-8 players the chance to study and play with professionals. Taught by professionals, the academy has offered opportunities for string and wind players and for future singers.

Each year, Musique Cordiale invites accomplished conductors to direct the orchestra and the choir. The idyllic surroundings of the Pays de Fayence provide a unique setting for these musicians and singers to perform together in an informal, Provençal environment. James Lowe, chief conductor of the Prussian Chamber Orchestra, Germany, and the Vaasa Sinfonia, Finland newly appointed music director of the Spokane Symphony, is among conductors of the Festival Orchestra and Graham Ross, director of Music at Clare College Cambridge, is again the Festival Choir and orchestra in 2023. Previous conductors include Tom Seligman, Errol Girdlestone, Tomas Netopil and Kevin Griffiths.

Since 2005, performances have included Mozart's C minor Mass and Requiem, Duruflé's Requiem, Bach's Magnificat and B Minor Mass, Haydn's Te Deum and Nelson Mass, Handel's Dixit Dominus and Solomon, Dvorak's Stabat Mater, The Monteverdi Vespers, Hayn's Seasons, The Messiah and Fauré's Requiem. 2019 featured a performance of Handel's Saul. Operas staged include Purcell's Dido & Aeneas, Mozart's Marriage of Figaro and Cosi fan Tutte, Puccini's La Bohème and Rossini's Barber of Seville. Orchestral and chamber works performed have covered a wide repertoire over the years and the Jazz evenings are added variety and spice, often in romantic out-of-door venues.

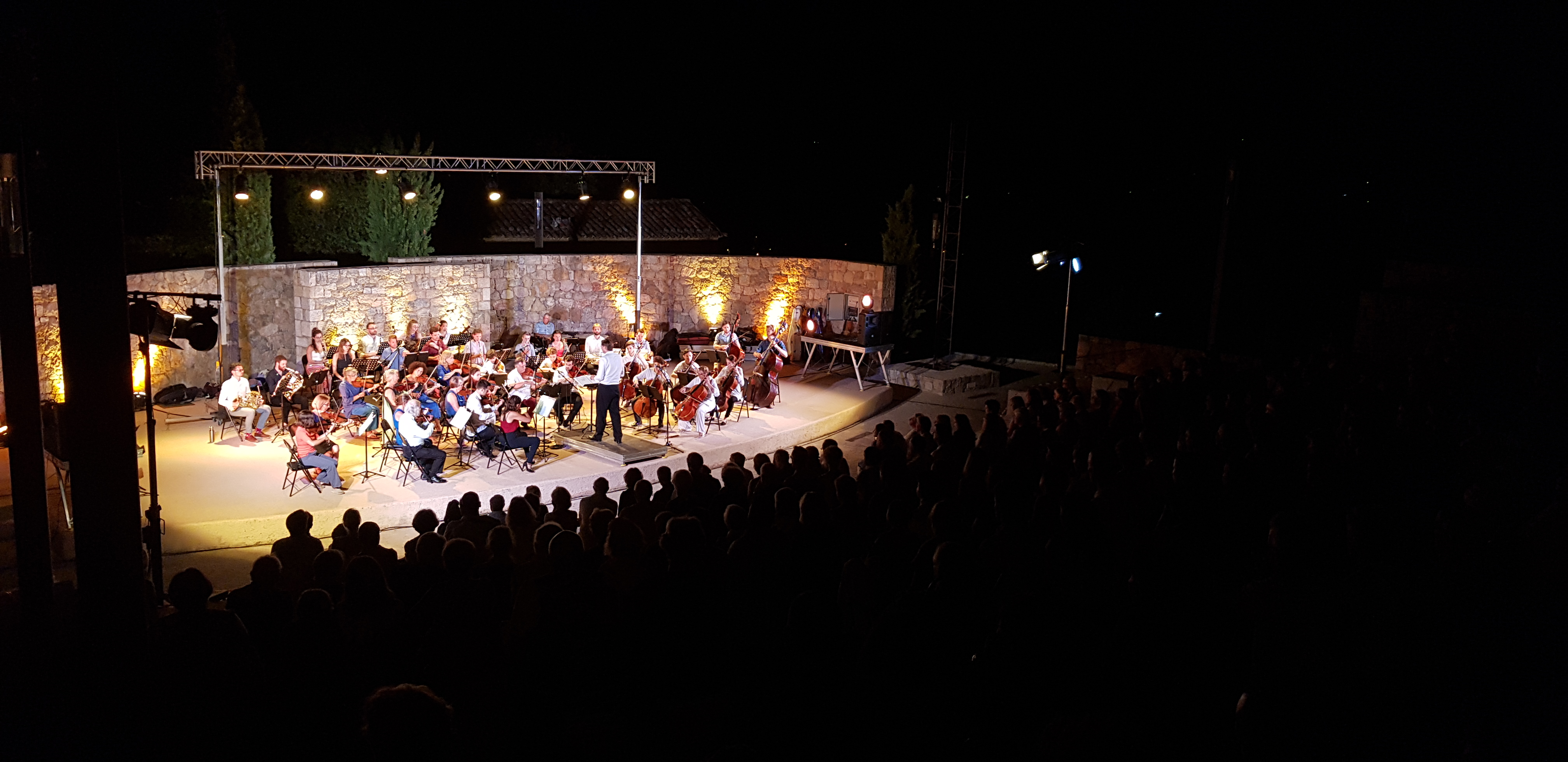
Musique-Cordiale orchestral concert, Fayence 2019, conductor James Lowe

== Commissions and autumn concerts ==
Works specially commissioned for Musique-Cordiale and premiered at the festival in recent years include pieces by Graham Ross and Cecilia McDowall. In 2005 and 2016, Musique-Cordiale featured in a weekend of choral and instrumental performance as part of the October Canterbury Festival and its choir has also performed in an autumn weekend in Totnes, Devon. It holds a regular series of choral and instrumental classical concerts each autumn in Kent, between September and November in Doddington Place Gardens and in the church and other venues in Faversham.

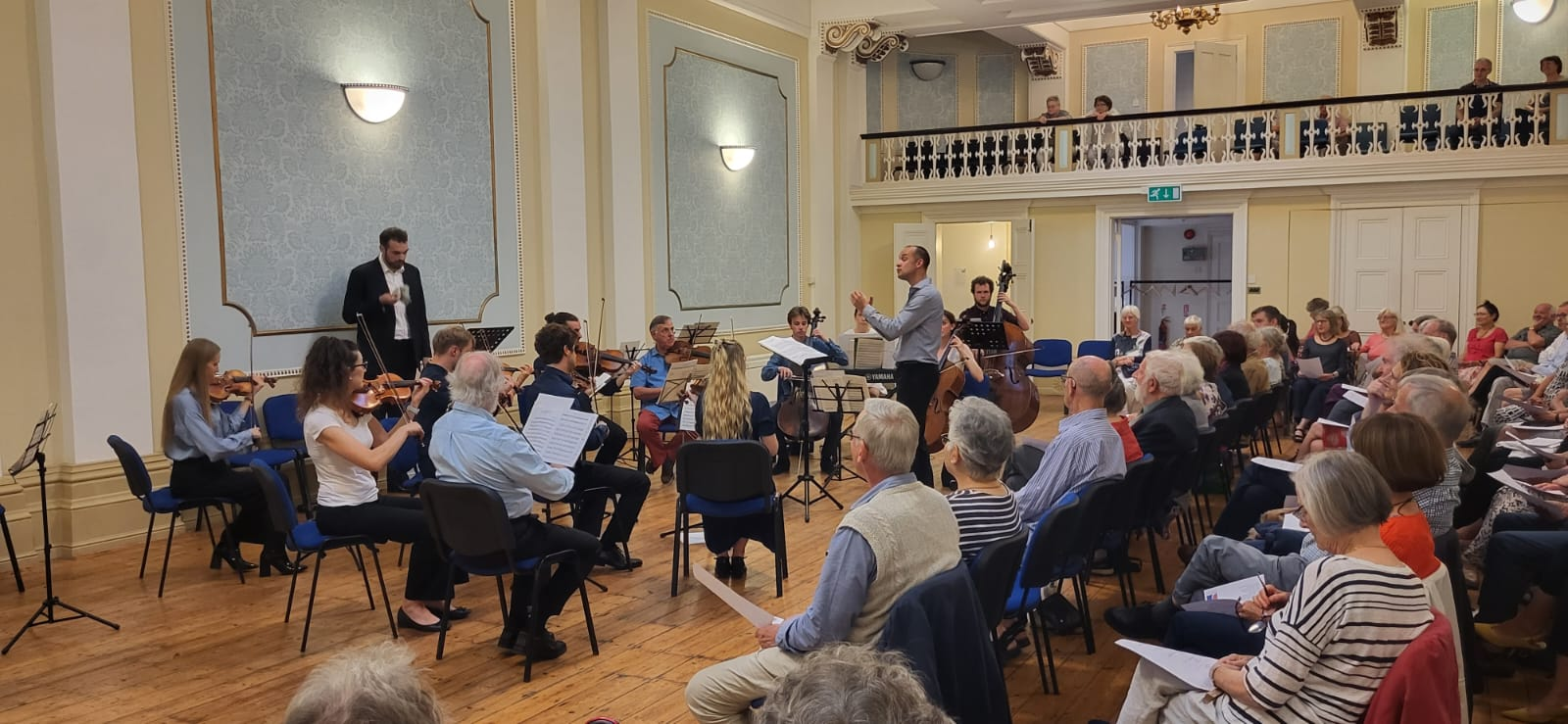
Concert in Faversham Kent, 2022

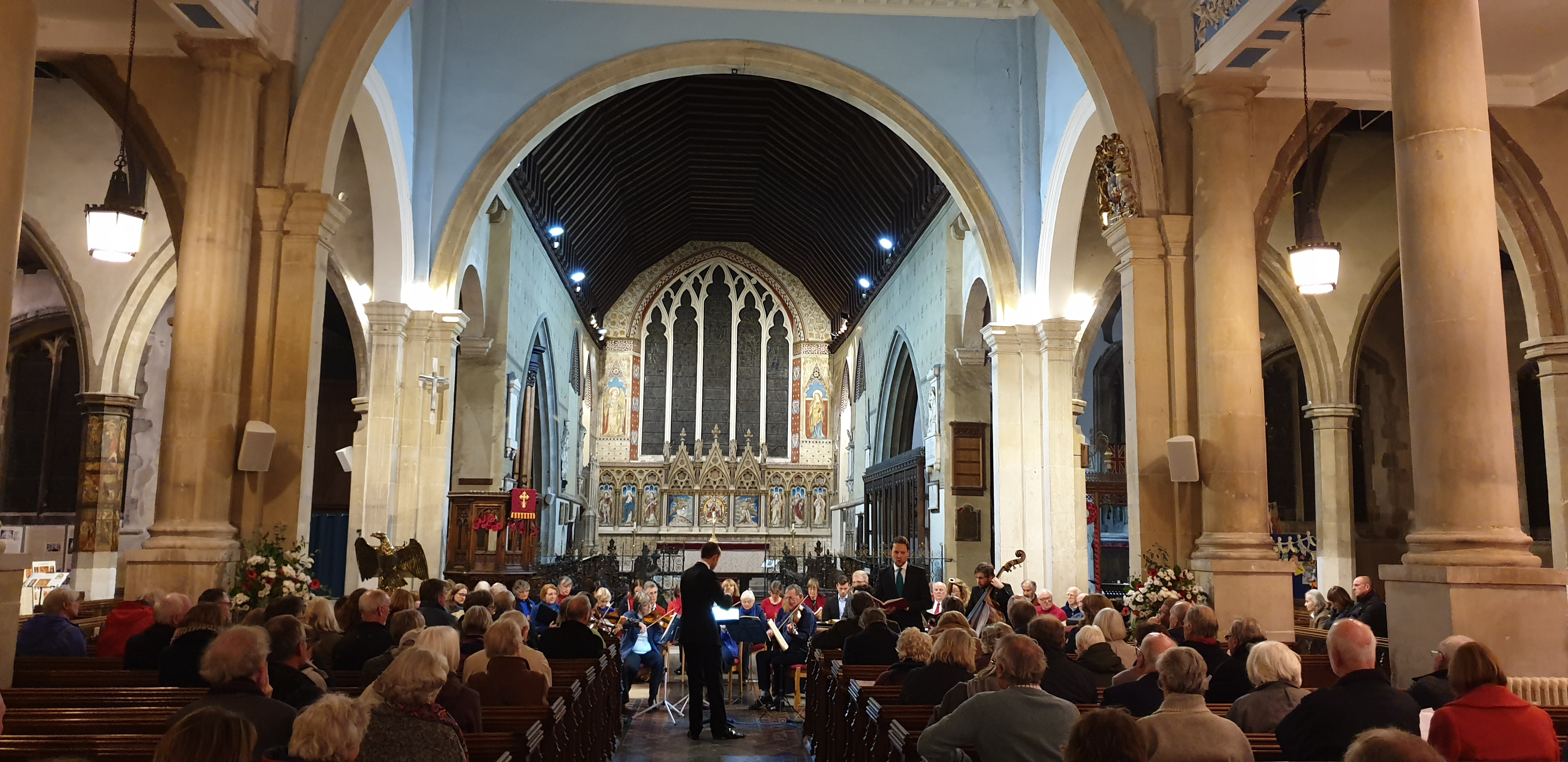
Musique Cordiale in Kent, Nov 2019, conductor Graham Ross

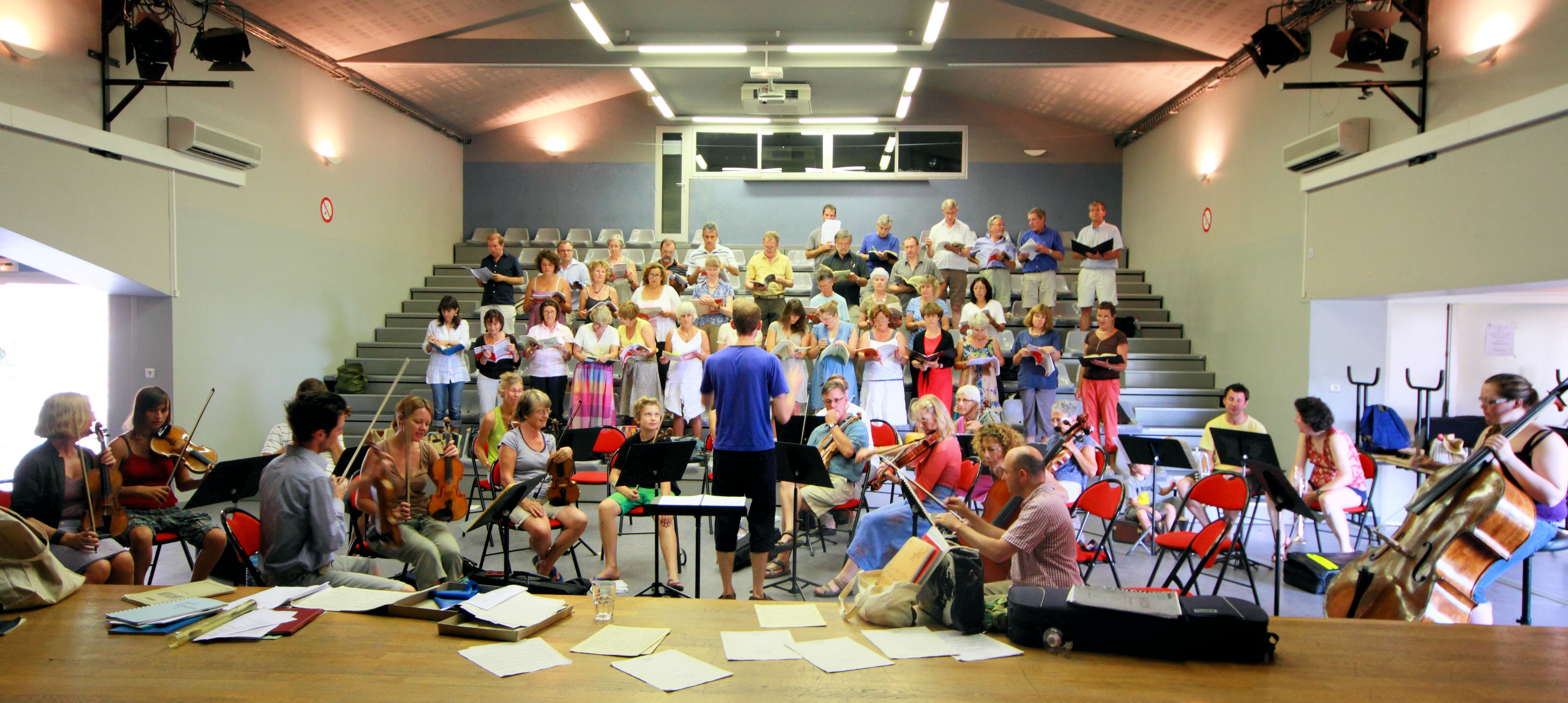
Choir & orchestra rehearsal under Tom Seligman, Seillans 2010

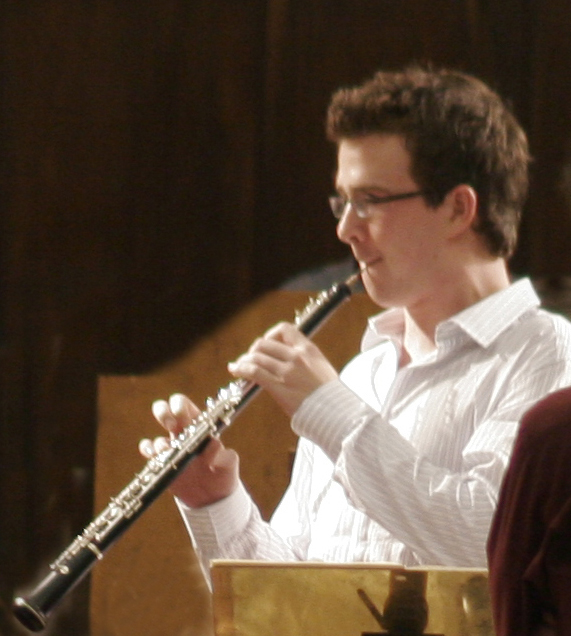
Mike O'Donnell, oboe, Musique-Cordiale Festival 2007

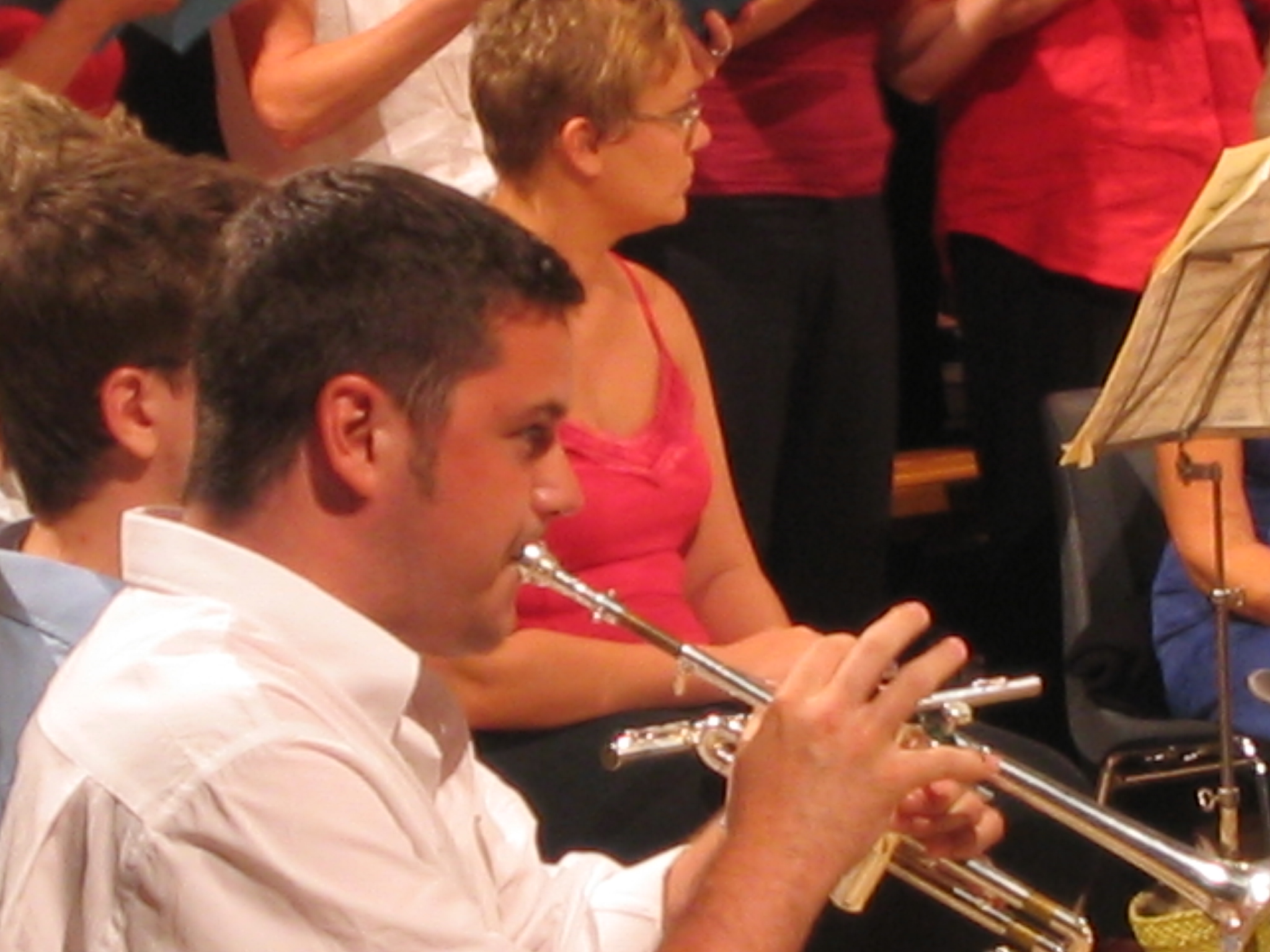
Craig Burnett, trumpet, 2005 Festival
