= Ensemble Cordial =

Ensemble Cordial is a choir and orchestra consisting of musicians and singers from many countries who come together for music-making and performances of major choral works. These are mainly during the annual Musique-Cordiale festival and events in Provence, France and Kent, England, including the Canterbury Festival.

Performances (and recordings) have included the a cappella Mass by Frank Martin and the Mass in B minor by Johann Sebastian Bach.
