= Choir of Clare College, Cambridge =

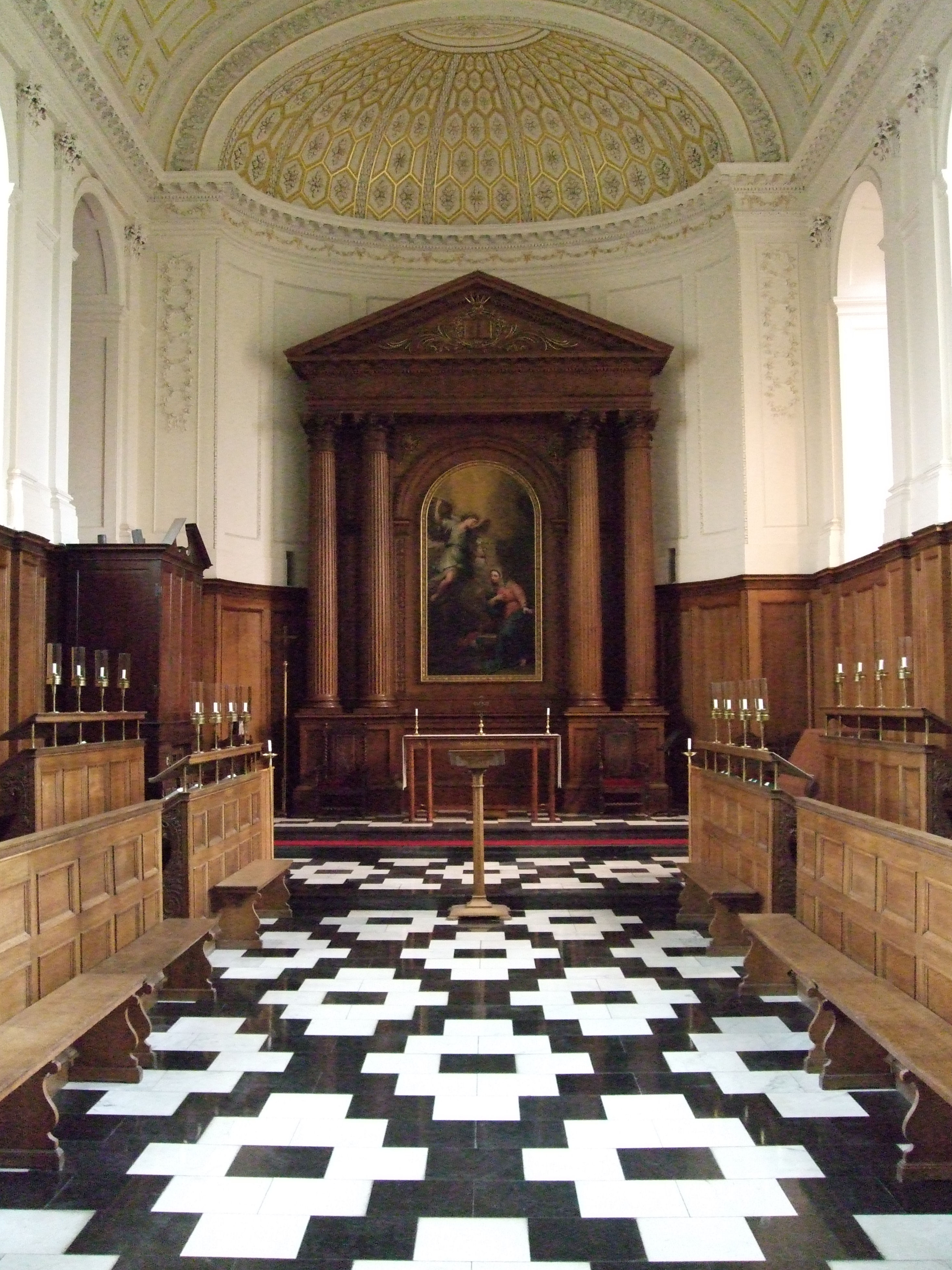
Clare College chapel

The Choir of Clare College, Cambridge, is a mixed-voice choir whose primary function is to lead services in the chapel of Clare College, Cambridge. Since its founding in 1972, the choir has gained an international reputation as one of the leading university choral groups in the world.

== History ==
The first chapel choir was formed in 1866. For the next one hundred years the choir consisted of undergraduate lower voices and a treble line provided by boys from city schools. In 1966, the use of boys was discontinued and for a brief period there was no upper line. The current mixed-voice choir was established in 1972 by Peter Dennison, a music fellow of the college. He was succeeded by the college's first director of music, John Rutter. Rutter left in 1979 to focus on composing but retains a close connection with the college as an honorary fellow. Timothy Brown directed the choir for 31 years until he was succeeded by the choir's current director of music, Graham Ross.

== Directors of Music ==
Since 1975 the choir has been conducted by the director of music, a fellow of the college.

- 1972–1975: Peter Dennison
- 1975–1979: John Rutter
- 1979–2010: Timothy Brown
- 2010–present: Graham Ross

== Membership of the choir ==
The choir normally consists of between 25 and 30 singers, most of whom are undergraduates at Clare College, Cambridge. In addition to the choral scholars, who are obliged to remain in the choir throughout their undergraduate studies, the choir includes some volunteer members who are often studying at other colleges as well as a lay clerk and a choir administrator.

=== Organ scholars ===
The organ is played by two organ scholars, who, like the choral scholars, are students (typically undergraduates) at the college. An organ scholarship is awarded as necessary to ensure that there are always two undergraduate organists in the college—a new scholar is appointed to arrive when the previous one graduates.

If the director of music is not present for any reason, an organ scholar takes responsibility for conducting the choir.

- 1942 — David Galliford
- 1969 — Stephen Banfield
- 1976 — Ivor Bolton
- 1979 — David Dunnett
- 1982 — Richard Egarr
- 1984 — Stephen Farr
- 1988 — Dominic Wheeler
- 1990 — Peter Clements
- 1993 — Jonathan Brown
- 1995 — James Grossmith
- 1996 — Andrew Henderson
- 1998 — John Reid
- 2000 — Nicholas Rimmer
- 2001 — Nicholas Collon
- 2003 — James McVinnie
- 2004 — Tim Harper
- 2006 — Simon Thomas Jacobs
- 2007 — Ashok Gupta
- 2009 — Nicolas Haigh
- 2010 — Peter Harrison
- 2012 — Matthew Jorysz
- 2014 — Anthony Daly
- 2015 — Michael Papadopoulos (assistant organist)
- 2016 — Eleanor Carter
- 2016 — Nicholas Morris (assistant organist)
- 2017 — Ashley Chow
- 2019 — George Gillow
- 2020 — Samuel Jones
- 2022 — Daniel Blaze
- 2023 — Evelyn Perfect
- 2025 — Jacob Costard

== Services ==
During the Cambridge full term, the choir sings choral evensong in the Clare College Chapel three times a week:

- 6:15 p.m. on Tuesdays and Thursdays
- 6:00 p.m. on Sundays, preceded with a recital at 5:25 p.m.

Additionally, the choir sings choral compline several times a term along with extra services such as Advent Carol services, All Souls and Ash Wednesday Vigils, weddings, funerals and memorial services.

Since 2015, the choir has a webcast of recorded services released on the choir website. Since 2020, the choir also live-streams choral services on their YouTube channel.

== Performing activities ==
Apart from sacred music sung mostly in choral evensong services, the choir also performs a wide range of music, including works by Toby Hession, Graham Ross, Sir John Tavener, Jonathan Dove, Herbert Howells, Tarik O'Regan, John Rutter, Giles Swayne (the college's former composer in residence) and James Whitbourn.

The choir also performs with instrumental groups such as the European Union Baroque Orchestra and the Dmitri Ensemble. In January 2016 it gave the world première of Green Mass, composed by Alexander Raskatov, in the Royal Festival Hall along with the London Philharmonic Orchestra conducted by Vladimir Jurowski; and in March 2018, the world première of Clare Canticles, composed by Toby Hession. The choir also performed in the Malaysian première of Fauré's Requiem in 2016 with the Malaysian Philharmonic Orchestra. Being the Choir & Organ magazine's 2020 New Music partners, the choir will première six new commissions throughout the 2020 calendar year.

== Tours ==
The choir maintains a strong recording and touring schedule. In recent years, the choir has toured throughout Europe, the US, the Middle East, Australia and Asia, usually between university terms. The choir also regularly performs in the United Kingdom, giving concerts in the major London concert halls, as well as at numerous festivals around the country.

Previous tours have included:

- 2005 — Europe (Greece, France, Spain, Italy, Germany)
- 2006 — Germany and Austria
- 2008 — France
- 2009 — Germany
- 2009 — US
- 2009 — Israel
- 2010 — US
- 2011 — France
- 2011 — Netherlands
- 2012 — Australia
- 2013 — US
- 2014 — Malta
- 2014 — US
- 2014 — Netherlands
- 2015 — US
- 2016 — Hong Kong, Malaysia and Singapore
- 2016 — France
- 2016 — Netherlands
- 2017 — Switzerland
- 2017 — US
- 2018 — Rome
- 2018 — France and Malta
- 2019 — Canada, US and Mexico
- 2019 — Spain
- 2019 — Macau, Hong Kong and Shanghai
- 2019 — Netherlands
- 2022 - Netherlands (Utrecht, Eindhoven, Almere), Belgium (Hasselt)

== Discography ==
The choir has recorded extensively, now exclusively for the Harmonia Mundi USA label. Releases on this label include Reformation 1517–2017, Pange lingua: Music for Corpus Christi and Mater ora filium: Music for Epiphany. Since 2010, the choir has recorded 13 CDs, including a series of 8 CDs for seasons of the Christian calendar with Harmonia Mundi USA:

- 2012 — Imogen Holst Choral Works (HMU907576)
- 2013 — Veni Emmanuel: Music for Advent (HMU907579)
- 2014 — Lux de caelo: Music for Christmas (HMU907615)
- 2014 — Stabat Mater dolorosa: Music for Passiontide (HMU907616)
- 2015 — Requiem: Music for All Saints and All Souls (HMU907617)
- 2015 — Ascendit Deus: Music for Ascensiontide & Pentecost (HMU907623)
- 2016 — Mater ora filium: Music for Epiphany (HMU907653)
- 2016 — Remembrance (HMU907654)
- 2016 — Haec Dies: Music for Easter (HMU907655)
- 2017 — Pange lingua: Music for Corpus Christi (HMM907688)
- 2017 — Reformation 1517–2017 (HMM902265)
- 2020 — Arvo Pärt: Stabat Mater (HMM905323)
- 2020 — Britten: A Ceremony of Carols (HMM905329)
- 2022 — Iceland: The Eternal Music (HMM905330)
- 2023 — Rolling River: American Choral (HMM905362)

Some previous recordings include:

- 1979 — The Holly and the Ivy (CD re-release 1989, Decca, 425 500-2)
- 1994 — Hodie: Carols from Cambridge (Gamut Classics, GAMCD543)
- 1995 — Miserere (Columns Classics, 290239)
- 1996 — A Cello Christmas (Cala Records, CACD55003)
- 1999 — Illumina (Collegium Records, COLCD125), conducted by Tim Brown and recorded in the Lady Chapel of Ely Cathedral by John Rutter
- 2000 — Blessed Spirit: Music of the Soul's Journey (Collegium Records, COLCD 127)
- 2005 — Light of the Spirit (Collegium Records, CSACD 902)
- 2006 — Tarik O'Regan: Voices (Collegium Records, COLCD 130)

== Notable Clare alumni ==
- Michael Brimer
- Ivor Bolton
- Nicholas Collon
- William Denis Browne
- Richard Egarr
- Stephen Farr
- The Right Rev'd David Galliford
- Patrick Gowers
- Toby Hession
- Martin How
- Matthew Jorysz
- John Kitchen
- Andrew Manze
- James McVinnie
- Sir Roger Norrington
- Graham Ross
- John Rutter
- Richard Stilgoe
- Elin Manahan Thomas
- Robin Ticciati
