= Musical Renegades =

Australian documentary (2003)

- Directed by: Tim Slade
- Written by: Tim Slade
- Produced by: Kylie du Fresne
- Cinematography: Kathryn Millis; Himman Dhamija
- Release date: 2003
- Running time: 52 minutes
- Country: Australia
- Language: English

Musical Renegades was a 2003 Australian documentary film on Australian Chamber Orchestra, led by artistic director Richard Tognetti. It follows them as they tour, rehearse, prepare and perform. It was filmed over a period of seven months in Australia and Europe and was first screened by SBS on 28 September 2003. The films soundtrack double album was nominated for the ARIA Music Award for Best Original Soundtrack, Cast or Show Album in 2004.

== Cast ==
- Richard Tognetti
- Zoe Black
- David Wicks
- Helena Rathbone
- Emma-Jane Murphy
- Melissa Barnard
- Caroline Henbest
- James Crabb
- Tamara Anna Cislowska
- Roland Peelman
- Genevieve Lacey
- Peter Wispelway
- Teddy Tahu Rhodes
