= Hendrik Jacobs =

Dutch violin maker

Hendrik Jacobs (c. 1630 – 1704) is the most famous Dutch violin maker of the 17th century.

== Biography ==
Hendrik Jacobs was born in Amsterdam, c. 1630.

Nothing is known about Hendrik Jacobs's early life, though he is thought to have been trained in part by Francis Lupo, alongside Lupo's stepson Cornelius Kleynman.

When Jacobs married Femmetje Jans, a widow, in 1654, he lived on Sint Antoniesbreestraat. She died at the end of April 1676; just over two months later, while still living at the same address, he married the widow Sibilla Barents.

Jacobs did not die in 1699, as is sometimes stated, but in 1704, on 31 December, and was buried in the Nieuwezijds Kapel, from a building on the Botermarkt. He was well-off and attracted a high burial tax, as did his widow in 1713, who was buried in the Nieuwe Kerk.

Jacobs trained two stepsons, Gijsbert Verbeek (the son of Femmetje Jans) and Pieter Rombouts (Sibilla Barents' son), as violin makers.

== Work ==
Jacobs' violins bear a striking resemblance to those of the then-famous Amati family from Cremona, Italy. He often labeled his instruments with the Amati name to indicate that he worked based on models by Nicolò Amati. Jacobs was the first violin maker to use whalebone as inlays. Hendrik Jacobs' violins were highly regarded and were compared in construction and tone quality to those of the great Italian violin makers. He also made cellos, violas, and bass viols. Jacobs was very productive after the age of fifty; approximately 60 violins built by him from that period are known.

Baroque violinist Franc Polman, who played in the Orchestra of the Eighteenth Century, among other places, plays violins by Hendrik Jacobs from 1694 and 1701.

The Kunstmuseum Den Haag owns a Jacobs violin from 1694 and one from 1698.

== Legacy ==
In 1949, the 'Concours Hendrik Jacobsz.' took place in The Hague: an international congress of violin makers, accompanied by a competition and an exhibition of string instruments.

Hendrik Jacobszstraat in Amsterdam Oud-Zuid is named after him (1901).
