= Richard Tognetti =

Australian violinist, composer and conductor

Richard Tognetti AO
- Born: Richard Leo Tognetti; 4 August 1965 (age 61); Canberra, Australian Capital Territory, Australia
- Occupation: Musician
- Spouse: Satu Vänskä

Richard Leo Tognetti (born 4 August 1965) is an Australian musician, violin soloist, ensemble player, leader, composer and arranger, conductor and artistic director.

As of March 2026, he serves as the artistic director and lead violinist of the Australian Chamber Orchestra (ACO).

== Early life and education ==
Richard Leo Tognetti was born in Canberra. He was raised in Wollongong, where he began his violin studies with Harold Brissenden, the retired Scottish violist William Primrose, and his wife Hiroko, who was a Suzuki method specialist. At the age of 11 he was admitted to the Conservatorium High School in Sydney, and continued his tertiary studies at the Sydney Conservatorium of Music.

His teacher was Alice Waten, herself a graduate of the Moscow Conservatory and former student of Valery Klimov and David Oistrakh. While there, Tognetti became leader and soloist of the chamber orchestra conducted by John Painter who was the Conservatorium's Director and later founder of ACO. In 1980 he won the National Youth Concerto Competition held in Brisbane by the Queensland Youth Symphony.

In 1987 Tognetti left Australia for post-graduate studies with Igor Ozim at the Bern Conservatory (now known as the University of the Arts Bern). During his time there he became a member of and soloist with the prestigious Camerata Bern, gave solo performances with the Bern Symphony Orchestra, and was guest concertmaster of the Basel Sinfonietta. Finally, at the end of his studies in 1989 he was awarded the Eduard Tschumi Musikpreis (Note: For information about the Eduard Tschumi Musikpreis-Stiftung see . Accessed 5 September 2019.) as the best graduate performer of that year.

== Career ==
=== Appointment to the Australian Chamber Orchestra ===
On return to Australia that same year Tognetti was appointed first as leader and then as artistic director of the Australian Chamber Orchestra, a remarkable development for a musician just 25 years old at the time. 2020 marked the 30th anniversary of his leadership of the orchestra.

During that time ACO has become regarded as one of the world's leading chamber orchestras. It tours several times a year around Australia presenting concerts in Adelaide, Brisbane, Canberra, Hobart, Melbourne, Newcastle, Perth, Sydney and Wollongong and participates regularly in various Australian arts festivals. Its annual overseas visits have taken it to the UK and Europe, North America and Asia where it has been heard in concert halls including Amsterdam's Concertgebouw, London's Barbican Centre and Royal Festival Hall, Vienna's Musikverein, Los Angeles' Walt Disney Concert Hall, Washington, D.C.'s John F. Kennedy Center for the Performing Arts, New York City's Carnegie Hall, Birmingham's Symphony Hall and Frankfurt's Alte Oper. It has held residencies in Hong Kong, a three-year post in London as International Associate Ensemble at the Barbican Centre's Milton Court, and through Tognetti's role as artistic director of Slovenia's Maribor Festival has had regular engagements there. (Note: Festival Maribor is held annually in Maribor in September and presents musicians and ensembles from all round the world. It is regarded as one of Europe's major music festivals. Accessed 5 September 2019.)

ACO's reputation has been affirmed in the Australian and international media. For example, Vincent Plush in The Weekend Australian said, "The Australian Chamber Orchestra is uniformly high-octane, arresting and never ordinary", The New York Times' Jeremy Eichler noted "virtuoso ensemble playing and an invigorating spontaneity that seemed to flow from Mr Tognetti's charismatic leadership", The Washington Post's Anne Midgette described the orchestra as having "the energy and vibe of a rock band with the ability of a crack classical chamber group", the Los Angeles Times's Mark Swed said, "this red hot band is long overdue for a major record contract and star treatment", Andrew Clements from the UK's The Guardian declared, "If there's a better chamber orchestra in the world today, I haven't heard it", and London's The Times hailed one of its appearances there by saying, "This must be the best chamber orchestra on earth." Tognetti and the Australian Chamber Orchestra were featured in the 2003 documentary film Musical Renegades and its soundtrack album, earning the Orchestra a nomination for the ARIA Music Award for Best Original Soundtrack, Cast or Show Album in 2004.

== Tognetti as performer, composer and arranger ==
Tognetti himself is an extremely versatile violinist with repertoire that covers all periods from the Baroque onwards. As his rapid professional progress suggests, Tognetti is highly regarded as a soloist with the opinions of many expressed in a review from the UK's The Telegraph: "He is one of the most characterful, incisive and impassioned violinists to be heard today."

Tognetti uses a number of violins according to need, most frequently the 1743 Guarneri del Gesù violin he has on extended loan from an anonymous owner. Others include period, modern and electric instruments. For example, in 1999 he and Australian rock musician Iva Davies co-wrote for an international millennium broadcast a work called The Ghost of Time for electric violin and orchestra and he performed it with the Sydney Symphony Orchestra on 31 December of that year.

Other works by Tognetti include The Red Tree for children's choir, chamber orchestra and projected images, co-written with Australian composer Michael Yezerski and inspired by Shaun Tan's illustrated book of the same name, music for Peter Weir's motion picture Master and Commander: The Far Side of the World co-written with Iva Davies and Christopher Gordon, and his music integrated with that of other composers in his documentaries such as Musica Surfica, The Reef, The Glide, The Crowd and Mountain. Musica Surfica, his film about music and his hobby surfing, won Best Feature at the 2008 New York Surf Film Festival.

As an arranger Tognetti has created repertoire for many different ensembles including ACO who have performed and recorded these works. Composers have included Janáček (String Quartet No 1 'Kreutzer Sonata'), Szymanowski (String Quartet No 2, Op 56), Haas (String Quartet No 2, Op. 7 'From the Monkey Mountains'), Paganini (Tognetti's own work Caprice on Caprices based on two of the original Caprices for solo violin), Schubert (String Quartet No 14 in D minor, D 810 'Death and the Maiden'), Beethoven (Violin Sonata No 9 in A major, Op 47 'Kreutzer'), Grieg (String Quartet No 1 in G minor, Op 27), Ravel (String Quartet in F major) and Satie (Choses vues à droite et à gauche (sans lunettes)).

Tognetti has been a longstanding collaborator with Oud virtuoso Joseph Tawadros, with their album Concerto of the Greater Sea winning the ARIA Award for Best World Music Album at the ARIA Music Awards of 2012. In March 2023, Tawadros and Tognetti were again live with the ACO in their concert Four Seasons at Hamer Hall, Melbourne.

Along with his busy schedule with ACO, Tognetti has appeared with other ensembles such as the Orchestra of the Age of Enlightenment, the Academy of Ancient Music, the Luxembourg Philharmonic Orchestra, the Slovenian Philharmonic Orchestra, the Handel and Haydn Society (Boston), the Hong Kong Philharmonic Orchestra, the Camerata Salzburg, the Tapiola Sinfonietta, the Irish Chamber Orchestra, the Nordic Chamber Orchestra and all the major Australian symphony orchestras, particularly the Melbourne Symphony Orchestra and Tasmanian Symphony Orchestra with whom he has appeared as soloist and director. He has also performed with various musicians from different genres including an appearance with Scottish classical accordionist James Crabb at the Opening Ceremony of the 2003 Rugby World Cup. At the 2001 Sydney Festival he made his debut as an opera conductor with Opera Australia's production of Mozart's Mitridate, re di Ponto, K 87.

== Recordings ==
As a soloist Tognetti has made many recordings including the violin concertos of Bach (ABC Classics ABC4765691), Beethoven (ABC Classics ABC4654252), Mozart (BIS BISSACD1754 & BISSACD1755) Vivaldi (BIS BISCD2103) and Dvořák (BIS BISCD1708) as well as chamber works such as Bach's Sonatas and Partitas for Solo Violin, BWV 1001–1006 (ABC Classics ABC4768051) and the Sonatas for Violin and Harpsichord, BWV 1014–1019 (ABC Classics ABC4765942).

Either leading or conducting ACO in association with other international musicians he has also recorded many works including Beethoven's piano concertos with Stephen Kovacevich (EMI Eminence CD-EMX 2177 (nla), CD-EMX2190 (nla) & CD-EMX 2184 (nla), Bach's keyboard concertos with Angela Hewitt (Hyperion CDA 67307 & CDA 67308), Vivaldi's flute concertos with Emmanuel Pahud (EMI Classics 0946 3 47212 2 6), Shostakovich's Cello Concerto No 1 in E flat major, Op 107 with Pieter Wispelwey (Channel Classics CCS 15395), Baroque trombone repertoire with Christian Lindberg (BIS BISCD1688), Beethoven's Piano Concerto No 4 in G major, Op 58 with Dejan Lazić (Channel Classics CCS SA 30511), Haydn's cello concertos with Daniel Müller-Schott (Orfeo C080031A), and a ground-breaking 2000 collaboration with Australia's rock singer and former politician Peter Garrett and cartoonist, poet and cultural commentator Michael Leunig which resulted in the release of a recording of Saint-Saëns' The Carnival of the Animals accompanying a book of Leunig's text and illustrations (Sydney: Macmillan, 2000. ISBN 0-7329-1070-6.).

== Honours and awards ==
In 1997 Tognetti received an honorary Doctor of Creative Arts degree from the University of Wollongong, the youngest recipient ever to receive such an award from that university. This was followed in 2003 with an honorary Doctor of Music degree from the University of Western Australia and in 2005 with an honorary Doctor of Music degree from the University of Sydney.

In 1999 Tognetti was declared a National Living Treasure, an award administered by the National Trust of Australia and based on popular vote.

On 1 January 2001, he was awarded a Centenary Medal, "for service to Australian society and the advancement of music".

On Australia Day 2010 Tognetti was appointed an Officer of the Order of Australia, "for service to music through leadership of the Australian Chamber Orchestra, as an internationally acclaimed violinist, through the development and promotion of educational programs for children, support for emerging artists and contributions to charitable organisations".

In 2022, he won the AACTA Award for Best Original Score in a Documentary along with William Barton and Piers Burbrook de Vere in 2022, for the soundtrack of Jennifer Peedom's 2021 film River.

=== AIR Awards ===
The Australian Independent Record Awards (known colloquially as the AIR Awards) is an annual awards night to recognise, promote and celebrate the success of Australia's Independent Music sector.

Year	Nominee / work	Award	Result	Ref.
2021	Brahms: Symphonies 3 & 4 Ensemble Offspring - Songbirds (with Australian Chamber Orchestra)	Best Independent Classical Album or EP	Nominated	
2022	River (with Australian Chamber Orchestra)	Best Independent Classical Album or EP	Nominated	
2024	Beethoven (with Australian Chamber Orchestra)	Best Independent Classical Album or EP	Won	

=== APRA Music Awards ===
The APRA Awards are held in Australia and New Zealand by the Australasian Performing Right Association to recognise songwriting skills, sales and airplay performance by its members annually.

Year	Nominee / work	Award	Result	Ref.
2022	"Spirit Voice of the Enchanted Waters" from River (William Barton, Piers Burbrook de Vere & Richard Tognetti)	Best Original Song Composed for the Screen	Won	

=== ARIA Music Awards ===
The ARIA Music Awards is an annual awards ceremony that recognises excellence, innovation, and achievement across all genres of Australian music.

Year	Nominee / work	Award	Result
1993	Janáček: Kreutzer Sonata for Strings, Barber: Adagio for Strings, Walton: Sonata for Strings (with Australian Chamber Orchestra)	Best Classical Album	Won
1994	Mendelssohn: Octet in E Flat for Strings Op. 20 Sinfonia No. 9 in C. Swiss (with Australian Chamber Orchestra)	Best Classical Album	Nominated
1994	Symphony Serenades and Suites (with Australian Chamber Orchestra)	Best Classical Album	Nominated
2000	Beethoven Violin Concerto & Mozart Symphony No. 40 (with Australian Chamber Orchestra)	Best Classical Album	Nominated
2006	Bach Sonatas and Partitas for Solo Violin	Best Classical Album	Won
2007	Bach Violin Concertos (with Australian Chamber Orchestra)	Best Classical Album	Won
2008	Bach Sonatas for Violin & Keyboard (with Neal Peres Da Costa & Daniel Yeadon)	Best Classical Album	Won
2010	Mozart Violin Concertos (with Christopher Moore & Australian Chamber Orchestra)	Best Classical Album	Nominated
2011	Mozart Violin Concertos Vol 2 (with Australian Chamber Orchestra)	Best Classical Album	Nominated
2016	Mozart's Last Symphonies (with Australian Chamber Orchestra)	Best Classical Album	Nominated
2017	Mountain (with Australian Chamber Orchestra)	Best Original Soundtrack, Cast or Show Album	Nominated
2019	Heroines (with Australian Chamber Orchestra & Nicole Car)	Best Classical Album	Nominated
2020	Beethoven & Mozart Violin Sonatas (with Erin Helyard)	Best Classical Album	Won
2022	River (with Australian Chamber Orchestra)	Best Original Soundtrack or Musical Theatre Cast Album	Won
2023	Indies & Idols (with Australian Chamber Orchestra)	Best Classical Album	Won
2024	Beethoven Symphonies 1, 2 & 3 'Eroica' (with Australian Chamber Orchestra)	Best Classical Album	Nominated
2025	Tchaikovsky: Serenade for Strings and Adante Cantabile / Shostakovich: Chamber Symphony in C Minor' (with Australian Chamber Orchestra)	Best Classical Album	Nominated
2026	Beethoven & Brahms Concertos for Violin and Orchestra (with Australian Chamber Orchestra)	Nominated	

=== Bernard Heinze Memorial Award ===
The Sir Bernard Heinze Memorial Award is given to a person who has made an outstanding contribution to music in Australia.

Year	Nominee / work	Award	Result	Ref.
2005	Richard Tognetti	Sir Bernard Heinze Memorial Award	awarded	

=== Helpmann Awards ===
The Helpmann Awards is an awards show, celebrating live entertainment and performing arts in Australia, presented by industry group Live Performance Australia since 2001. Note: 2020 and 2021 were cancelled due to the COVID-19 pandemic.

Year	Nominee / work	Award	Result	Ref.
2017	Himself	JC Williamson Award	awarded	
2017	Bach Violin Concertos - Richard Tognetti	Best Individual Classical Performance	Nominated	

=== Mo Awards ===
The Australian Entertainment Mo Awards (commonly known informally as the Mo Awards), were annual Australian entertainment industry awards. They recognise achievements in live entertainment in Australia from 1975 to 2016. Richard Tognetti won three awards in that time.

Year	Nominee / work	Award	Result (wins only)
1992	Richard Tognetti	Classical Performance of the Year	Won
1993	Richard Tognetti	Classical Performance of the Year	Won
1994	Richard Tognetti	Classical Performance of the Year	Won
