= Doddington Place Gardens =

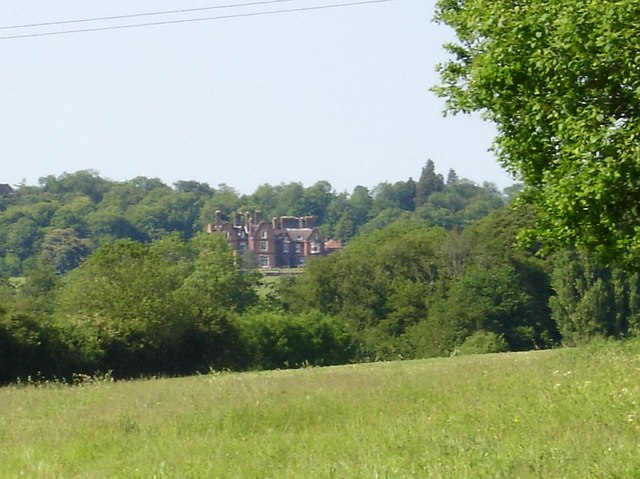
- Interactive map of Doddington Place Gardens
- Location: Doddington, near Faversham, UK
- Coordinates: 51.2836°N 0.7857°E
- Area: 10 acres (40,000 m^{2})
- Opened: 1965
- Owner: Richard Oldfield
- Status: Open April–September, Wednesdays, Sundays and bank holidays.
- Collections: Arboretum, exotic shrubs, rose garden,

Doddington Place Gardens is part of a 850 acres (3,400,000 m^{2}) Edwardian estate, located on the edge of Doddington village, near Faversham in Kent, UK.

== History ==
The Grade II listed Victorian mansion was built in 1870 for Sir John Croft (son of Sir John Croft, 1st Baronet ) by the architect Charles Brown Trollope.

In 1873, Markham Nesfield (1842-74),(son of the better known garden designer William Andrews Nesfield) designed the formal terrace next to the house for Sir John Croft. Unfortunately nothing remains now of his detailed planting plans.

In 1906, the Crofts sold Doddington Place and the estate to General and Mrs. Douglas Jeffreys. Who added the rock garden and she was also responsible for planting about a mile of box hedging. Then their nephew inherited the estate, John Richard Anthony Oldfield (MP) and his wife Jonnet Elizabeth Richards added to the garden. He died aged 100 at Doddington. The current owner is Richard Oldfield, cousin of John Oldfield, Richard Oldfield is the Executive Chairman of the asset management company Oldfield Partners and is the Vice Lord Lieutenant of Kent, as well as being the President of the Faversham Society. The estate suffered extensive damage in the Great Storm of 1987. Around 60 trees were damaged in the garden alone.

The gardens have been open in aid of the National Gardens Scheme for more than fifty years.

== Description ==
The gardens consist of a large woodland garden, with a collection of rhododendrons and azaleas. Other features include an Edwardian rock garden with pools (currently undergoing extensive renovation), a formal sunken garden with herbaceous borders, and a flint and brick folly at the end of a long grass walk. It was described by Sir Roy Strong as a 'piece of Hampton Court'. The garden also has extensive lawns and avenues are bordered by large clipped yew hedges and many old trees.

The garden has featured in numerous magazine and newspaper articles and twice on TV on ITV Meridians 'Country Ways' programme. It has also been the scene of episodes in the television series Perfect Scoundrels (with Peter Bowles) and featured in 'Great Houses Cookery' (by Michael Barry). Part of the film Waterland, starring Jeremy Irons and Natasha Richardson, was also filmed within the gardens. The Victorian mansion was used as the ancestral home to Tom Crick (played by Irons).

The garden has been used several times to host operas. In 2009, 'The Marriage of Figaro' was performed by The Opera Project (including Nick Garrett in aid of the Kent Association for the Blind.
