= Mountain (2017 film) =

- Film poster
- Directed by: Jennifer Peedom
- Written by: Robert Macfarlane; Jennifer Peedom
- Produced by: Jo-Anne McGowan; Jennifer Peedom
- Narrated by: Willem Dafoe
- Cinematography: Renan Ozturk
- Edited by: Christian Gazal; Scott Gray
- Music by: Richard Tognetti
- Production company: Stranger Than Fiction
- Distributed by: Amstelfilm (Netherlands) (theatrical); Madman Entertainment (Australia) (theatrical); Neo Films (Greece) (theatrical); DCM Film Distribution (Germany) (all media)
- Release date: 12 June 2017 (Australia)
- Running time: 74 min.
- Country: Australia
- Language: English

Mountain is a 2017 Australian documentary film, co-written, co-produced and directed by Jennifer Peedom. It premiered at the Sydney Opera House in June 2017. Mountain follows Peedom's 2015 documentary film Sherpa.

== Synopsis ==
The film explores high peaks around the world while telling the relationship between humans and mountains across time.

== Cast ==
- Willem Dafoe, as the narrator

Adventure sports people:

- Alex Honnold
- Conrad Anker
- Jimmy Chin
- Tommy Caldwell
- Matt Helliker
- Renan Ozturk
- Will Gadd
- Ricky Bell
- Freddie Wilkinson
- John Jackson
- David Lama
- Sean 'Stanley' Leary
- Stefan Glowacz
- Leo Houlding
- Tim Emmett
- Jason Pickles
- Hilaree O'Neill
- Joey Schusler
- Mark Landvik
- Matt Blank
- Pat Moore
- Rob Jarman
- Sam Seward
- Scotty Lago
- Tara Kerzhner
- Travis Rice
- Tyson Swasey
- Kurtis Sorge
- Jonathan Winter
- Karl Thompson
- Theo Sanson
- Andy Farrington
- Candide Thovex
- Danny Davis
- Darren Berrecloth
- Filippo Fabbi
- Ian Flanders
- Jon Devore

== Production ==
After her critically acclaimed film, Sherpa, producer Peedom resumes her work with American mountaineer and photographer Renan Ozturk. He is responsible for most of the images in the film. American actor Willem Dafoe narrates the film and reads passages from Robert Macfarlane's book "Mountains of the Mind". The production company was Stranger Than Fiction.

== Critical response ==
On review aggregator Rotten Tomatoes, the film has an approval rating of 84% based on 68 reviews, with an average rating of 7.1/10. The website's critical consensus reads, "Mountain offers a visually thrilling – and surprisingly affecting – look at man's relationship with some of Earth's most imposing natural wonders." On Metacritic, the film has a weighted average score of 82 out of 100, based on 13 critics, indicating "universal acclaim".

Janine Israel from The Guardian gave the film four out of five stars and called it a "masterful documentary". Gayle MacDonald from The Globe and Mail gave the film three out of four stars, praising the visual and musical feature of the film. Harry Windsor from The Hollywood Reporter called it "one of the most visceral essay films ever made" thanks to the musical score and the non-traditional narrative approach, however, he criticised the length of the movie, defining it "slightly overextended".

== Accolades ==
At the 8th AACTA Awards, Mountain won three awards: "Best Cinematography in a Documentary" (Renan Ozturk), "Best Original Music Score in a Documentary" (Richard Tognetti), and "Best Sound in a Documentary" (David White and Robert Mackenzie). The documentary was also nominated for "Best Editing in a Documentary" (Christian Gazal and Scott Gray) and "Best Feature Length Documentary.

Robert Mackenzie was nominated for the "Award for Best Sound" at the 2017 Australian Screen Sound Guild. The film was also nominated for "Best Documentary Feature" at the 2017 Hamptons International Film Festival and "Best Documentary Film (Local or International)" at the 2018 Australian Film Critics Association Awards.
