= Collegium Records =

British record label

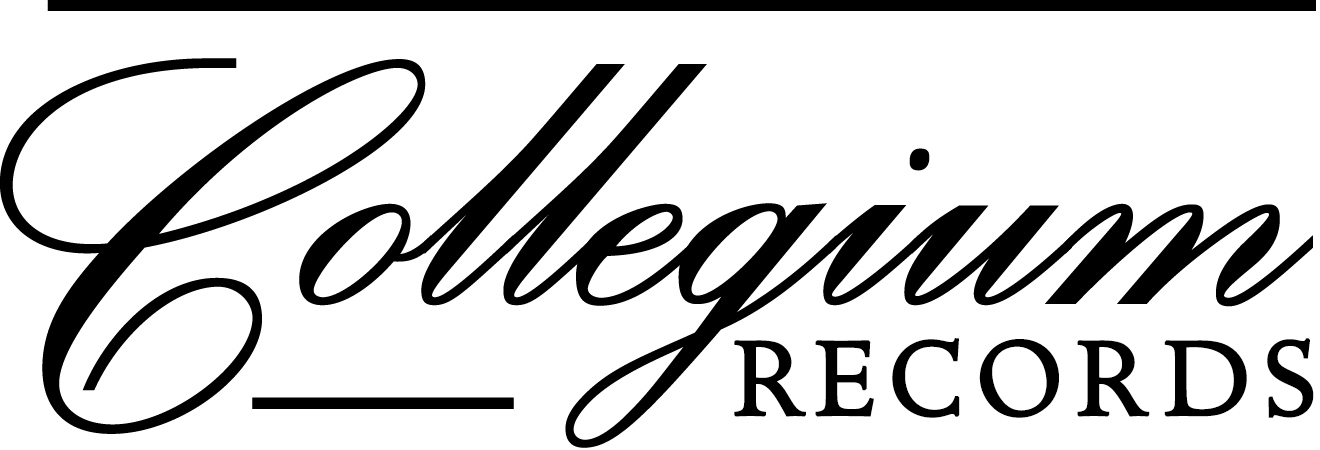
- Founded: 1984
- Founder: John Rutter
- Distributor: Naxos
- Genre: Classical
- Country of origin: England

Album issued by Collegium in 2006

Collegium Records is an English classical music record label founded in 1984 by British composer and conductor John Rutter, primarily to record his work with the Cambridge Singers. The label has also worked with artistes including composer Tarik O'Regan, soprano Elin Manahan Thomas, the City of London Sinfonia, and the Choir of Clare College, Cambridge.
