= Dejan Lazić =

Croatian pianist and composer (born 1977)

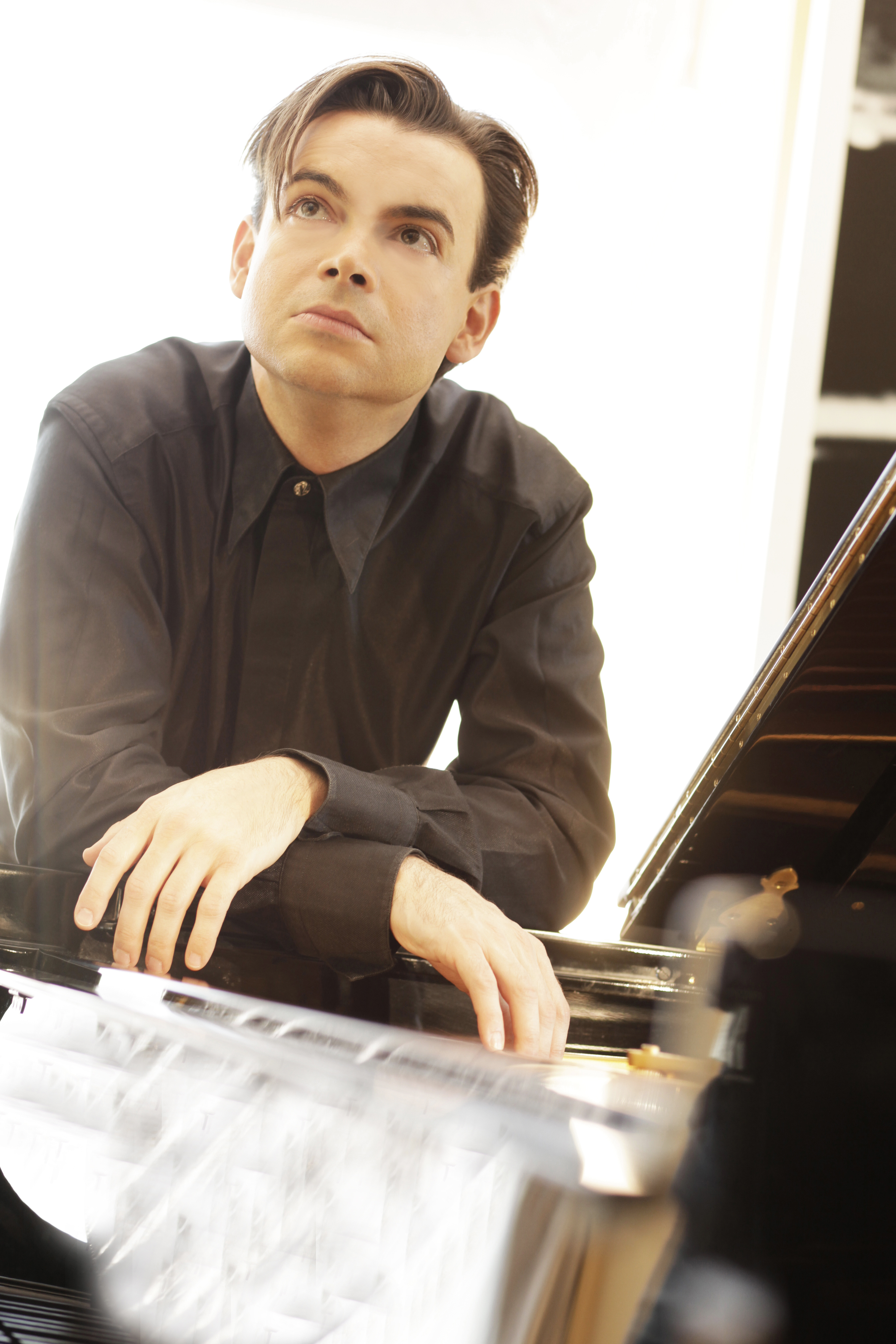
Dejan Lazić photographed by Susie Knoll

Dejan Lazić (born in Zagreb, 1977) is a Croatian pianist and composer, and a naturalised Austrian citizen. He has appeared with such orchestras as the Budapest Festival Orchestra, Rotterdam Philharmonic, Philharmonia Orchestra, City of Birmingham Symphony, Bamberger Symphoniker, Swedish Radio, Danish National, Helsinki Philharmonic, Australian Chamber Orchestra and NHK Symphony Orchestra, working with such conductors as Iván Fischer, Vladimir Ashkenazy, Giovanni Antonini, Kirill Petrenko, Robert Spano and John Storgårds.

Lazić made his BBC Proms debut in summer 2011, performing two concerts; once with BBC Philharmonic Orchestra, to give the UK premiere of his own arrangement of the Brahms Violin Concerto for piano and orchestra and again to perform Liszt with Budapest Festival Orchestra and Iván Fischer. Further performances with BFO/Fischer in the current season include dates in Budapest and on tour in Gent, Milan and at the Beethovenfest Bonn. He appears also with the Kammerorchester Basel, performing at the Vienna Konzerthaus, Hamburger Philharmoniker at Hamburger Ostertöne festival, Trondheim Symphony, Helsinki Philharmonic and, further afield, Orquestra Sinfônica do Estado de São Paulo, plus Pacific and Atlanta Symphony Orchestras.

Lazić appeared in the Far East with orchestras such as NHK Symphony Orchestra, Yomiuri Nippon Symphony Orchestra (including concerts at Tokyo's Suntory Hall and Metropolitan Art Space), Sapporo Symphony, Seoul Philharmonic, Hong Kong Philharmonic, as well as a series of recitals throughout Japan and at the Forbidden City Concert Hall in Beijing, China. In summer 2008 he performed Beethoven's 3rd Piano Concerto at the Beijing Great Hall of People in a televised pre-Olympics gala concert for an audience of 7,000.

Alongside his solo career, Lazić is also a chamber musician. Recently Artist in Residence with the Netherlands Chamber Orchestra, he has given recitals at Amsterdam Concertgebouw, London Queen Elizabeth Hall, Munich Prinzregententheater, Washington Kennedy Center, plus in Montreal, Tokyo, Beijing and Istanbul.

He records for Channel Classics and has released a dozen recordings so far, including works by Scarlatti/Bartók and Schumann/Brahms, all as part of his Liaisons series; the next in the series will couple together CPE Bach/Britten. His live recording of Rachmaninov Piano Concerto No 2 with London Philharmonic Orchestra/Kirill Petrenko received the German Echo Klassik Award 2009. His latest release is a disc featuring Beethoven's 4th Piano Concerto, recorded live with the Australian Chamber Orchestra led by Richard Tognetti.

Lazić is also active as a composer. His works include various piano compositions, chamber music and orchestral works, as well as cadenzas for Mozart, Haydn, and Beethoven piano concertos. His arrangement of Brahms's Violin Concerto for piano and orchestra was premiered with the Atlanta Symphony Orchestra and Robert Spano in 2009 and further performances this season, in addition to BBC Proms, will include at Amsterdam's Concertgebouw and in Japan. A live recording of the concerto was released in January 2010. Currently he is working on his own Piano Concerto.

Born into a musical family in Zagreb, Croatia, Lazić grew up in Salzburg, Austria, where he studied at the Mozarteum. He now lives in Amsterdam.

== "Right to be forgotten" controversy ==
On 30 October 2014, Lazić attempted to use the European Union "right to be forgotten" law to remove a critical review published by The Washington Post.
