= Pieter Rombouts =

Dutch violin maker

Pieter Rombouts (1667 – 1729) was a Dutch violin maker. He also made violas da gamba and cellos.

== Biography ==
Pieter Rombouts was baptized in the Oude Kerk, Amsterdam, on 25 November 1667 as the son of Jan Rombouts (a naval clerk) and Sibilla Barents. After Jan Rombouts' death, Barents remarried, to violin maker Hendrik Jacobs. Pieter Rombouts married Machdalena Kruyskerk from Kalverstraat in 1706, from the Botermarkt. He lived with his mother at the time; he stated that he was 32 years old.

He was buried on 27 September 1729, in the Zuiderkerk (his profession was listed as violin maker at the Bootermarkt). His widow moved to Binnenamstel and was one of the many rentiers Amsterdam had in 1742. She was among the richest 5% of the country's inhabitants. Her son, Wijnand, became a citizen of the city in 1740 and then announced that his father had died.

== Professional life ==
Rombouts ran workshops on Sint Antoniesbreestraat and Botermarkt. He was also known as Pieter Jacobs, after his stepfather. His stringed instruments were highly sought after, partly because of their highly arched design, which was also used by Italian violin makers such as Nicola Amati and Pietro Guarneri. His violins can also be recognized by their reddish-brown varnish and (sometimes) the use of baleen. Tarisio describes his work as less refined than that of his stepfather.

== Legacy ==
A violin and viola da gamba he made are in the Kunstmuseum Den Haag (Scheurleer collection). The cellist Pieter Wispelwey plays a baroque cello by Rombouts.
