= Toby Hession =

English composer, conductor, and pianist

Toby Hession (born 6 February 1997) is an English composer, conductor, and pianist.

== Early life and studies ==
Hession was born in Peterborough. Between 2010 and 2015 he attended Chetham's School of Music, Manchester, studying piano with Masayuki Tayama, with whom he continues to study, and composition with Gavin Wayte. He read music at Clare College, Cambridge and graduated in 2018, having held a choral scholarship and an instrumental award there.

== Compositions ==
Hession has written works which have been performed in numerous venues (amongst them Westminster Abbey, King's College, Cambridge, Peterborough Cathedral, etc.) by such ensembles as the Choir of Clare College, Cambridge, Aurora Orchestra, the Manchester Camerata, the Commonwealth Festival Orchestra and Inner Voices.

Hession's choral works include a commission by The King's Singers and a set of canticles premièred by the Choir of Clare College, Cambridge in 2018. His works for the stage include Told By An Idiot (2022), In Flagrante (2023) and the operetta A Matter of Misconduct!, which was first performed at the Festival Theatre, Edinburgh, on 6 June 2025 and then travelled to London's Opera Holland Park, all on libretti by Emma Jenkins.

Hession's works have been broadcast on Classic FM and Radio 3 and are published by Edition Peters.

== Conductor ==
Hession has conducted a wide range of ensembles in venues such as West Road Concert Hall, Cambridge, Westminster Abbey, Bridgewater Hall and Manchester Cathedral.

In January 2018, Hession conducted the UK premiere of Iván Fischer's Eine Deutsch-Jiddische Kantate in Clare College Chapel.

== Pianist ==
Hession has given performances across the UK, at venues including West Road Concert Hall, Cambridge, St. Martin in the Fields, St. James's Piccadilly, London, the Royal Northern College of Music and Peterborough Cathedral. He has performed Grieg's Piano Concerto and Beethoven's Fifth Piano Concerto ('Emperor') with the Cambridge University Music Society (CUMS) orchestra and the East Anglia Chamber Orchestra respectively.
