= Kent Association for the Blind =

Registered charity

- Founded: 1920
- Type: Blindness organization
- VAT ID no.: 03339912
- Registration no.: 1062354
- Purpose: Supporting sight impaired people to live independent lives.
- Location: 72 College Road, Maidstone, England
- Region served: Kent, Medway, Bromley, Bexley
- Key people: Eithne Rynne
- Website: http://www.kab.org.uk
- Formerly called: Kent County Association for the Blind

Kent Association for the Blind is a registered charity providing rehabilitation services for children and adults with visual impairment to help them live independent lives. Services are provided by six rehabilitation teams based in Kent, Medway and Bromley. Additional specialist support is provided in Bexley.

== Origins ==
The charity was founded in 1920 to provide registration and support services for soldiers whose vision had been damaged during the First World War. The UK Government's ‘Blind Person’s Act’ of 1920 authorised Local Authorities to “promote the welfare of blind persons”. The primary responsibilities of the Association were “the compilation of a complete and up-to-date register of all blind persons in the County" and "the investigation of all cases needing help”. By March 1921, nine months after the Association was created, 902 people had been registered (the population of Kent in June 1921 was 1.6 million), and it had provided services for 70 individuals.

== Current services ==
=== Rehabilitation ===
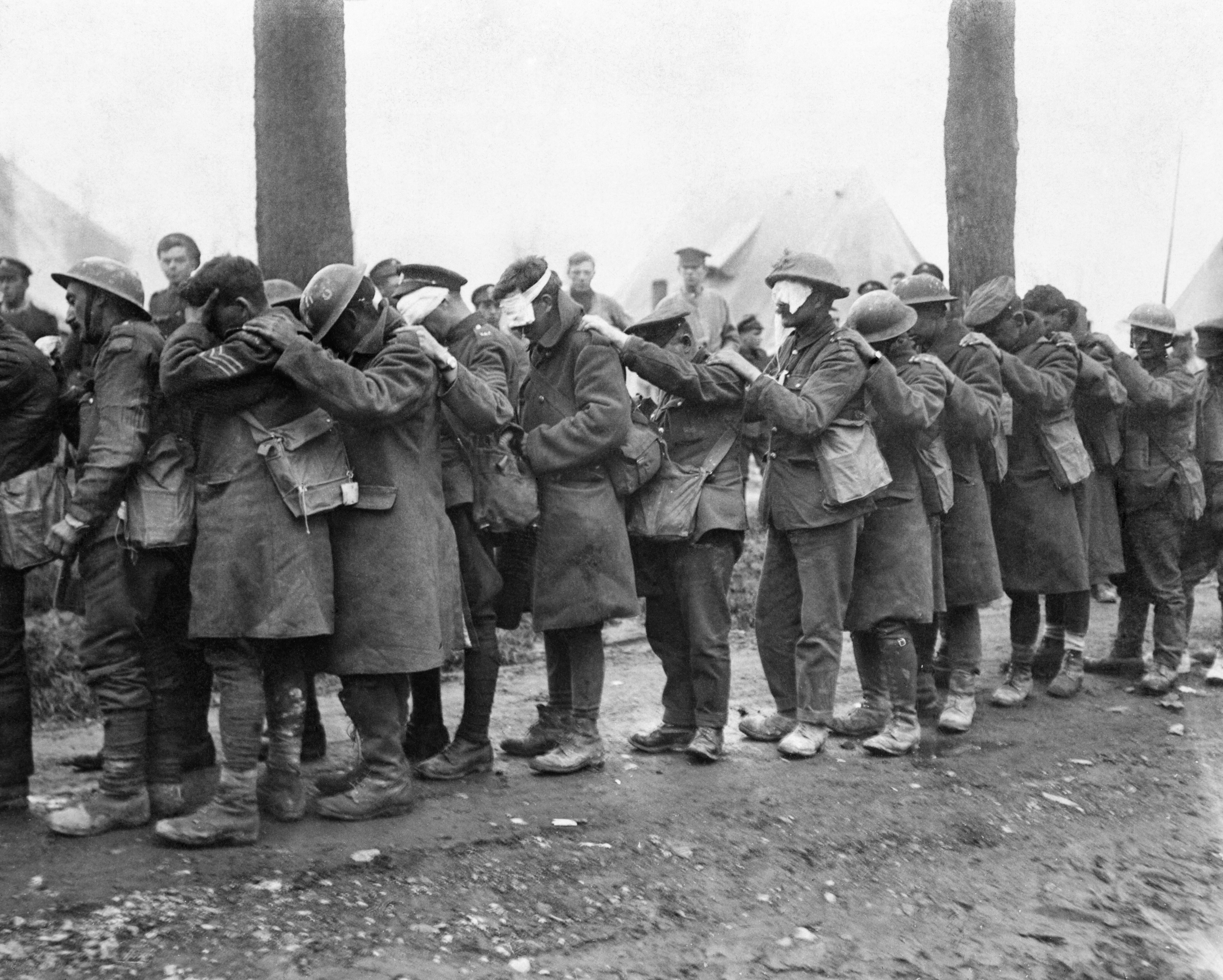

Rehabilitation services provide information and advice, and daily living skills and mobility training to help ensure that people with sight impairments are able to live active and independent lives. Specialist support for people with learning disabilities recognises that there is a much higher incidence of sight impairments amongst people with learning disabilities than the non-learning disabled population.

=== Guide Communicator Service ===
The charity provides a specialist one-to-one service for people with dual sensory impairment (deafblind). A team of Guide Communicators act primarily as facilitators for people who are deafblind, helping them to interact within their local communities and environment.

=== Leisure and social support ===
The charity operates a network over six local clubs and groups throughout the region. These groups provide social support and activities including art and craft groups and social clubs for older people.

=== Digital Kent talking newspapers ===
Weekly talking newspapers and magazines were provided to almost 2,000 people whose sight is impaired. The majority of subscribers of this free service were in their 80s and 90s and the service which includes recordings of local news, helped them keep in touch with local news and events. The service was ended in 2022 due to declining demand.

=== Transcription service ===
KAB offers a service to companies and organisations to make their information accessible to sight impaired people. The service transcribes material into digital audio formats including CD, USB, MP3, SD and DAISY as well as into large print or Braille.

=== Training ===
KAB in partnership with Canterbury Christ Church University offer a two-year Foundation Degree in Health and Social Care (Visual Impairment Rehabilitation) to provide trained rehabilitation professional specialising in working with people with sight impairments.

== Funding ==
Although it received funding from Local Authorities, KAB depends upon donations from public, business and foundation sources to fund its work. As much as a third of its income is received from these voluntary sources.
