= Lydia Kakabadse =

British composer

Lydia Kakabadse (born 1955) is a British composer of vocal, choral and chamber music. Her musical style is tonal and modal with influences from chant and early polyphony, Orthodox liturgical music and other non-western music. It also incorporates the Arabic scale with traditional Western harmonies.

Her choral piece Odyssey was commissioned by the Hellenic Institute of Royal Holloway, University of London. In 2015 she was commissioned to write a choral piece, I Remember by her old school, Forest Preparatory School in Altrincham, for performance at an inter-school music event. Two short pieces were performed at the Three Choirs Festival in Gloucester Cathedral in 2019, and her chamber work Concertato was performed at the Chatsworth Arts Festival later the same year. Her chamber work Russian Tableaux was broadcast by BBC Radio 3 to mark International Women's Day in 2015 and 2017.

== Compositions ==
Kakabadse's work includes:

- Arabian Rhapsody Suite
- As I Sat at the Café
- A Vision
- Cantica Sacra
- Cantus Planus
- Concertato
- Courage
- Dance Sketches
- Eldorado
- Haunted Houses
- I Remember
- Kontakia
- Odyssey
- Recitativo Arioso + Variations
- Russian Tableaux
- Sancte Ioseph
- Spectre of the Maiden Scorned
- Spellbound
- The Coachman's Terror
- The House Where I was Born
- The Mermaid
- Theotokia
- The Phantom Listeners
- The Ruined Maid
- The Song of the Shirt
- The Way through the Woods

== Recordings ==
- The Phantom Listeners (2011), Naxos
- Cantica Sacra (2016), Divine Art
- Concertato (2017), Divine Art
- Ithaka (2019), Divine Art.
