= Jennifer Peedom =

Australian filmmaker

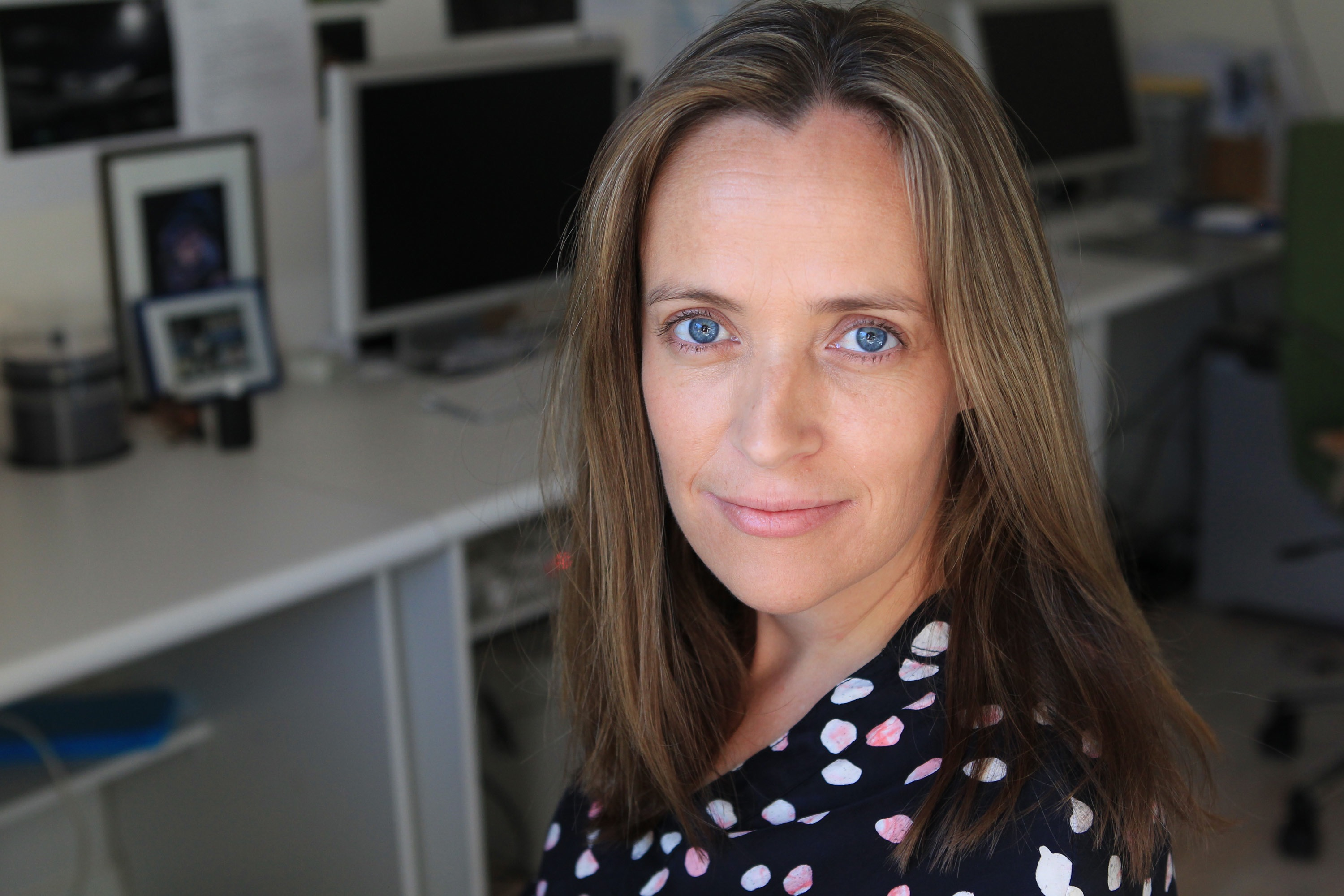
- Peedom in 2014
- Born: Jennifer Peedom; Canberra
- Education: RMIT, Melbourne
- Occupations: Director, writer, producer
- Years active: 2000–present
- Spouse: Mark Rogers
- Website: www.jenpeedom.com.au

Jennifer Peedom is an Australian filmmaker. She has written, directed, and produced feature-length documentary films, including Sherpa (2015) and Mountain (2017), as well as a number of TV series. She co-directed the 2021 feature documentary River, and her feature documentary about cave diving, Deeper, was released in 2025. Peedom's narrative feature film Tenzing, featuring Tom Hiddleston, was released in Australian cinemas on 9 October 2026 ahead of its 16 October release on Apple TV+.

== Early life and education ==
Jennifer Peedom was born in Canberra, Australia.

She graduated with a Bachelor of Business (Honours) from RMIT in Melbourne in 1997.

== Career ==
=== Filmmaking ===
Peedom's first film was an SBS Dateline 2003 special titled Everest's Sherpas: Forgotten Heroes of the Himalayas, focusing on the lives of the Sherpas who take tourists up the mountain. It would be the start of a long creative relationship with the Himalayas and the Sherpa community.

Peedom's feature documentary film Solo (co-directed with David Michôd) won the 2009 Australian Film Institute Award for Best Documentary Under One Hour. It also won the Film Critics Circle of Australia Award and the Australian Directors' Guild award, as well as six major awards at international film festivals.

Her film Sherpa, which was filmed during the 2014 Mount Everest avalanche, won the 2015 Grierson Award for Best Documentary at the BFI London Film Festival. It premiered internationally at the Telluride Film Festival and also screened at Toronto Film Festival and received a BAFTA nomination in 2016 for Best Documentary.

In 2017 Peedom directed Mountain, a collaboration with the Australian Chamber Orchestra (ACO) with script by Robert Macfarlane, narrated by Willem Dafoe. It screened theatrically in 27 countries and went on to become, at the time of its release, the highest grossing non-IMAX Australian documentary of all time (as of 3 March 2022, third). It won three AACTA Awards in 2018.

In 2021 she co-directed, with Joseph Nizeti, River, a documentary about rivers with a similar scope and format as Mountain. The film is also written by Macfarlane, narrated by Dafoe, and accompanied by a soundtrack by the ACO.

Her feature documentary about Richard "Harry" Harris, an Australian doctor and recreational cave diver who was largely responsible for rescuing a group of Thai boys stranded in a flooded cave in 2018, titled Deeper, was released in Australian cinemas on 30 October 2025, after being selected for screening at SXSW in Austin, Texas. Luke Buckmaster, writing in The Guardian, gave the film three stars out of five, calling it "interesting but not exactly visually stunning", writing that it did not explain to the viewer why cave divers do what they do. The diving magazine website InDepth wrote that the film "shines a rare and positive light on the sport", and was impressed by "the detailed incorporation of safety features". X-Ray Mag called it "a visual and technical feast" for divers, but a somewhat detached view of the sport, that "does not fully penetrate the emotional or philosophical heart of its protagonist".

In 2025, filming began on Peedom's narrative feature film Tenzing, featuring Tom Hiddleston. It was released in Australia cinemas on 9 October 2026 ahead of its 16 October release on Apple TV+.

=== Teaching ===
In 2012, Peedom lectured on documentary film at AFTRS.

== Awards and recognition ==
In 2004, Peedom was named NSW Young Telstra Business Woman of the Year.

She was the winner of the inaugural David and Joan Williams Documentary Fellowship in 2011.

== Personal life ==
As of 2022 Peedom is married to stills photographer Mark Rogers, and they have two children.
