= John Painter (cellist) =

Australian classical cellist (1932–2025)

John Galloway Painter AM (28 September 1932 – 13 September 2025) was an Australian classical cellist. He founded the Australian Chamber Orchestra in 1975, and was director of the Sydney Conservatorium of Music from 1982 to 1985.

== Life and career ==
Painter was born in Adelaide on 28 September 1932. He was associated with arts organisations such as the Music Board and Community Arts Committee of the Australia Council for the Arts, the board of Musica Viva Australia, the Victorian Institute of Colleges, the National Institute of Dramatic Art and the Australian National Academy of Music.

In 1996, Painter was a judge of the Sydney International Piano Competition of Australia. In 2013–14, he was Chair of adjudicators for the inaugural Australian Cello Awards, with the Finals Concert held in Sydney on 30 March 2014.

Painter died in Canberra on 13 September 2025, at the age of 92.

== Awards and honours ==
In 1981, Painter was made a Member of the Order of Australia for service to music.

=== Bernard Heinze Memorial Award ===
The Sir Bernard Heinze Memorial Award is given to a person who has made an outstanding contribution to music in Australia.

Year	Nominee / work	Award	Result	Ref.
2002	John Painter	Sir Bernard Heinze Memorial Award	Awarded	
