= Canterbury Festival =

Music festival in Kent, England

The Canterbury Festival is Kent's international festival of the arts. It takes place in Canterbury (England) and surrounding towns and villages (including Faversham, Whitstable and Margate) each October/November and includes performances of a variety of types of music, art, comedy, circus, theatre, walks, talks, and a Science strand. It has featured performances by Sir Willard White, Michael Nyman, Hugh Masekela, Rebecca Stephens, Texas, Joanna MacGregor, Van Morrison, Bryn Terfel, Sophie Ellis-Bextor, Tom Allen, Michael Mcintyre and Ned Sherrin and by ensembles such as the Polish National Radio Symphony Orchestra, the Tchaikovsky Symphony Orchestra, the Endellion and Brodsky Quartets, the Ensemble Cordial, Brass 10, and the Soweto Gospel Choir. Venues include Canterbury Cathedral, the Great Hall at Kent College, the Malthouse Theatre at The King's School, Westgate Hall and At Gregory's Centre for Music at Canterbury Christ Church University.

== History ==
It was initiated in the 1920s by George Bell during his time as Dean of Canterbury. Guest artists during his time included John Masefield, Gustav Holst, Dorothy L. Sayers, and T. S. Eliot (whose 1935 drama Murder in the Cathedral was commissioned by Bell for the festival). That was within the first ten years of the festival in which it had flourished, with its plays. The festival was established closely with the friends of Canterbury organization. In 1970 the Dean at the time and city council got together and joined forces, to work on the festival together for the first time. Then in 1984 the festival got a revamping. A new theatre had been built in Canterbury, and the festival started to include almost every art form. That year the festival included music, visual arts, cinema, theatre, literature and more. International events helped the festival gain the name of Kent’s international arts festival in 2004. That year the festival had lasted three weeks. Now the festival is two weeks but holds over 200 events in those two weeks with 65,000 festival goers. The festival also includes things like classical music, contemporary music and dance, international music, comedy, talks and even walks.

== Achievements ==
The festival was previously a National Portfolio Organization, receiving national arts funding from the Arts Council. The Festival is currently supported by Partner and Principal Sponsor Canterbury Christ Church University who celebrated ten years as Partner and Principal Sponsor in 2021. The Festival is also supported by Headline Sponsors Kent College and Paul Roberts Associates, alongside local support and funding from businesses, organisations and trusts from across East Kent, as well as Corporate Members, Vice Presidents and the Festival Friends. Between 2013 and 2019 Canterbury Festival presented a programme of unique events in the Salon Perdu Spiegeltent, a 1920s Art Nouveau temporary venue. During the Pandemic Canterbury Festival presented a smaller Festival in October 2020 with a reduced programme and socially distanced seating, the programme included Joanna MacGregor performing all 32 of Beethoven's Sonatas. In 2022 Canterbury Festival welcomed light and sound artists Luxmuralis to Canterbury Cathedral for the first time, presenting Shine: Let There Be Light, a three day light and sound installation attended by 11.5 thousand people.

== External links and references ==
- Official website
