= Australian Chamber Orchestra =

Australian not-for-profit chamber orchestra

- Short name: ACO
- Founded: 1975
- Location: Walsh Bay Wharves Precinct, Sydney
- Concert hall: City Recital Hall
- Music director: Richard Tognetti
- Website: aco.com.au

The Australian Chamber Orchestra (ACO) is an Australian orchestra focused on chamber music based in Sydney.

== History ==
The Australian Chamber Orchestra was founded by cellist John Painter in 1975. Richard Tognetti was appointed lead violin in 1989 and subsequently appointed artistic director.

As well as frequent Australian tours, the Sydney-based Australian Chamber Orchestra often tours Asia, Europe and the US, including regular performances at London's Wigmore Hall, New York City's Carnegie Hall and Lincoln Center, Vienna's Musikverein and Washington's Kennedy Center. The ACO is the only frequently touring Australian musical ensemble internationally.

In 2014 an album of the orchestra, featuring the American soprano Dawn Upshaw as soloist, won three Grammy Awards. The orchestra appears in the films Musical Renegades and Musica Surfica and the television series Classical Destinations, series two.

In 2005, ACO Collective, a second ensemble combining emerging artists and Australian Chamber Orchestra musicians was formed as a training and regional touring orchestra.

The ACO musicians perform on a collection of several Golden Age string instruments, including three Stradivarius violins. Richard Tognetti performs on a 1743 Guarneri del Gesù violin, on loan from an anonymous benefactor. Principal violin Satu Vänskä performs on the 1726 Belgiorno Stradivarius on loan from Guido and Michelle Belgiorno-Nettis, and principal violin Helena Rathbone plays a 1732 Stradivarius violin on loan from an anonymous benefactor. Principal viola Stefanie Farrands plays a 1610 viola by Giovanni Paolo Maggini. Principal cello Timo-Veikko Valve performs on a 1616 Amati cello on loan from the ACO Instrument Fund, and double bassist Maxime Bibeau plays a 1585 instrument by Gasparo da Salò, Maggini's teacher.

In the wake of the COVID-19 pandemic, the risk of live events being cancelled led the orchestra to produce a series of concert films, StudioCasts, for digital distribution, releasing eight 50-minute films in 2021.

== Awards and nominations ==
=== AIR Awards ===
The Australian Independent Record Awards (commonly known informally as AIR Awards) is an annual awards night to recognise, promote and celebrate the success of Australia's Independent Music sector.

| Year | Nominee / work | Award | Result | Ref. |
|---|---|---|---|---|
| 2021 | Brahms: Symphonies 3 & 4 Ensemble Offspring – Songbirds (with Richard Tognetti) | Best Independent Classical Album or EP | Nominated | |
| 2022 | River (with Richard Tognetti) | Best Independent Classical Album or EP | Nominated | |
| 2024 | Beethoven (with Richard Tognetti) | Best Independent Classical Album or EP | Won | |
| 2025 | Memoir of a Snail | Best Independent Classical Album or EP | Nominated | |

=== ARIA Music Awards ===
The ARIA Music Awards is an annual awards ceremony that recognises excellence, innovation, and achievement across all genres of Australian music. They commenced in 1987.

| Year | Nominee / work | Award | Result | Ref. |
|---|---|---|---|---|
| 1987 | Mozart in Delphi | Best Classical Album | Nominated | |
| 1993 | Janáček: Kreutzer Sonata for Strings, Barber: Adagio for Strings, Walton: Sonata for Strings (with Richard Tognetti) | Best Classical Album | Won | |
| 1994 | Mendelssohn: Octet in E-flat for Strings, Op. 20; Sinfonia No. 9 in C. Swiss (with Richard Tognetti) | Best Classical Album | Nominated | |
| 1994 | Symphony Serenades and Suites (with Richard Tognetti) | Best Classical Album | Nominated | |
| 1996 | Peter Sculthorpe: Music for Strings | Best Classical Album | Won | |
| 1996 | Spirit | Best Classical Album | Nominated | |
| 1997 | Il Tramonto – The Sunset | Best Classical Album | Nominated | |
| 2000 | Beethoven Violin Concerto & Mozart Symphony No. 40 (with Richard Tognetti) | Best Classical Album | Nominated | |
| 2004 | Musical Renegades | Best Original Soundtrack, Cast or Show Album | Nominated | |
| 2007 | Bach Violin Concertos (with Richard Tognetti) | Best Classical Album | Won | |
| 2009 | Classical Destinations II | Best Classical Album | Nominated | |
| 2010 | Mozart Violin Concertos (with Richard Tognetti & Christopher Moore) | Best Classical Album | Nominated | |
| 2011 | Mozart Violin Concertos Vol 2 (with Richard Tognetti) | Best Classical Album | Nominated | |
| 2016 | Mozart's Last Symphonies (with Richard Tognetti) | Best Classical Album | Nominated | |
| 2017 | Mountain (with Richard Tognetti) | Best Original Soundtrack, Cast or Show Album | Nominated | |
| 2019 | Heroines (with Richard Tognetti) | Best Classical Album | Nominated | |
| 2022 | River (with Richard Tognetti) | Best Original Soundtrack or Musical Theatre Cast Album | Won | |
| 2023 | Indies & Idols (with Richard Tognetti) | Best Classical Album | Won | |
| 2024 | Beethoven Symphonies 1, 2 & 3 'Eroica' (with Richard Tognetti) | Best Classical Album | Nominated | |
| 2025 | Tchaikovsky: Serenade for Strings and Adante Cantabile / Shostakovich: Chamber Symphony in C Minor' (with Richard Tognetti) | Best Classical Album | Nominated | |
| 2025 | Memoir of a Snail (Original Motion Picture Soundtrack) | Best Original Soundtrack or Musical Theatre Cast Album | Nominated | |
| 2026 | Beethoven & Brahms Concertos for Violin and Orchestra (with Richard Tognetti) | Best Classical Album | Nominated | |
