= List of Nate Is Late episodes =

Nate Is Late is a French animated television series created by Sylvain Huchet and Peter Saisselin and produced by Watch Next Media, La Factorie Animation, Superprod Studio and Nate Is Late Productions for France 4, Super RTL, 9Go! (season 1 only), and YouTube (season 3 only). The series revolves around Nate and Malika, two children who constantly get sidetracked on adventures that make them late for school. When they finally arrive, Principal Prudence almost always chooses to not believe their stories.

== Series overview ==
Series	Episodes	Originally released		
Series	Episodes	First released	Last released	Network
1	52	26 May 2018	9 September 2018	9Go!
2	52	31 January 2022	1 June 2022	Pop
3	52	5 April 2025	TBA	YouTube

== Episodes ==
=== Season 1 (2018) ===
No. overall	No. in season	Title	Written by	Storyboarded by	Original air date
1	1	"The Garbage Goblins"	Sylvain Huchet and Peter Saisselin	Édouard Kuchiman	26 May 2018
Nate accidentally drops his new watch into the sewer where he and his best friend, Malika, have to go down to retrieve it. There, they meet a goblin named Pimple whose family is being threatened by a troll.
2	2	"The Roman Ruins"	David Witt	Jérémy Guiter	26 May 2018
The duo's shortcut through a construction site leads to an old colosseum underground where they meet Atticus, the ghost of a young gladiator who was afraid to fight back then and is cursed to haunt the grounds until he proves himself. A chance comes up when the three run afoul of two disgruntled construction workers.
3	3	"The Carnivorous Plant"	Peter Saisselin	Édouard Kuchiman	26 May 2018
Nate forgots to water the class's Venus flytrap Kiki over the weekend and needs to revitalize it quick. The duo's gardener friend, Violet, gives them some formula to do so, but Nate uses too much causing the plant to grow gigantic.
4	4	"The Dragon"	Cyril Vernet	Virginie Hanrigou	26 May 2018
Nate comes across a baby dragon and comes to care for it. But the two realize its mother will be looking for it. Not helped that a local animal catcher, Maxime, seeks the dragon for his own greedy ends.
5	5	"The Insects"	Reid Harrison	Gaultier Buiret	27 May 2018
The duo end up accidentally shrunk thanks to the device of the bumbling scientist friend, Professor Toybos. In order to reverse the transformation, they have to traverse his yard to reach the device before it is taken away by garbage collectors. They are helped by some friendly bugs along the way.
6	6	"The Secret Agent"	Joris Morio	Victor Ianni	27 May 2018
The duo come across a secret agent who claims he's on a case. But not all is as it seems.
7	7	"The Leprechaun"	Fiona Leibgorin; Original idea by: Sonia Gozlan and Françoise Ruscak	Ivan Evans	2 June 2018
The duo help a leprechaun named Shaun to find an evil one who stole his gold coins which they must get back quickly before Shaun turns to stone.
8	8	"The Adorable Monster"	Augustin Mas and Stéphanie Tallon	Morade Rahni	3 June 2018
On the way to school, Nate and Malika are invited to ride a dark ride in the park where they're scared by the prop monsters save for one at the end. They find out the monsters are real and the ride was a test to get their scaring diploma. However, the last monster, Wizimix, fails because he looks too cute. Taking pity on him, the duo convince the instructor to give Wizimix another chance, but she threatens them if they lie to her.
9	9	"The Haunted House"	David Witt	Daniel Dubuis	2 June 2018
The duo agree to deliver a letter to an abandoned mansion on the way to school but end up trapped inside with another occupant and find the house is haunted and bringing objects to life within.
10	10	"The Enchanted Frog"	Alice Diener	Althea Aseoche	3 June 2018
The duo come across a talking frog named Gideon who was cursed by the mother of his true love, Chloe, because she assumes he only sought Chloe for her beauty rather than true love. Nate gets turned into a frog in an attempt to break the spell via kissing, forcing the three to raid the witch's lair and find a way to get Nate and Gideon back to normal.
11	11	"The Kid from the Future"	Simon Lecocq	Gaultier Buiret	2 June 2018
The duo are about to make it to school without incident when they see a boy named Ascor emerging from a time portal seeking to change an event in the past that results in his timeline having stricter restrictions in his school. The duo travel into the future to see what it is like and must later retrieve Ascor's time travel board before it is destroyed by the robotic principal.
12	12	"The Mermaids"	Diane Morel and Françoise Boublil	Luke Allen	2 June 2018
While walking through the park, Nate drops his cookie wrapper in the lake. When he goes to retrieve it, he's enchanted to fall into it. Malika follows and the duo find out mermaids live within who aren't happy that humans are throwing trash into the lake, and have created a trash monster from the magic waters. The duo agree to help stop it and prevent further pollution.
13	13	"The Genie"	Simon Lecocq	Ivan Evans, Peter Sheehan, and Benjamin Vatré	9 June 2018
The duo are given a lamp to deliver and find it houses a genie inside. However, he schemes to be free and tricks Nate into taking his place, forcing Malika to try to set things right.
14	14	"The Magic Book"	Fiona Leibgorin	Althea Aseoche	9 June 2018
Malika's favorite book about a warrior princess named Leviah suddenly sucks Nate and her inside its world where they meet the titular heroine and help her to stop the evil King Ari from taking all the water of the savanna. However, if they complete the story, Leviah will die in the final encounter as she was written.
15	15	"The Sorcerer's Apprentice"	Jane Schneider	Gaultier Buiret	9 June 2018
Nate and Malika meet Winkle, a young wizard in training from the Middle Ages who accidentally warped himself to the future. While trying out Winkle's wand, Nate accidentally summons a chimera and forces the three to run. Winkle reveals he was actually supposed to fight it as a final test but procrastinated on studying and tried to avoid it via time travel. The duo must help him gain the courage to face it and stop its threat.
16	16	"The Cuddly Toy"	Marie Manand	Ivan Evans	16 June 2018
The duo come across a toy bunny who belongs to the local bully, Terry. He claims it isn't his when they try to return it. But they find the bunny is alive and is taken by the council of toys to find another owner. However, the toy bunny isn't ready to leave Terry yet and Nate and Malika must convince the council that Terry still needs her.
17	17	"The Superhero"	Simon Lecocq, Pierre-Gilles Stehr, and Xavier Vairé	Mike Chavez	16 June 2018
The duo comes across a heroine name Miracle Girl who loses her headband that gives her her powers. Nate takes it but finds himself in trouble against her arch-nemesis, a blob monster named Gigantix. Prompting Miracle Girl, he and Malika have to work together to stop his plot of crashing a satellite into Earth.
18	18	"The Alien"	Peter Berts	Victor Ianni	10 June 2018
The duo come across an alien named Zediac who is intrigued to experience human school. But he reveals that space pirates are after him for a ransom. However, things aren't what they seem.
19	19	"The Robot"	Jean-Christophe Hervé and Cédric Perrin	Benjamin Vatré	16 June 2018
Toybos's robot, Elvex, feeling neglected by his creator, starts bringing appliances to life in the city to take it over and leave humans without their amenities. Nate, Malika, and Toybos must find a way to stop him.
20	20	"Santa's Reindeer"	David Evans	Luke Allen	9 June 2018
It's Christmas time but Malika isn't interested in writing to Santa due to not getting what she wanted last year, thus not believing in him. This changes when she and Nate happen across Santa who is looking for his missing reindeer, Brian, who got separated from him during a training run. The duo help out and find their search leads to another encounter with the greedy animal catcher, Maxime.
21	21	"The Pocket Watch"	Maël Le Mée and Raphaelle Rio	Luke Allen	16 June 2018
Nate showcases a pocket watch his father lent him. However, its mechanism becomes jammed while he and Malika are making their way to school and suddenly warps them back to the start of the morning. The duo find themselves in a time loop that rewinds them back after a set amount of time and must figure out a way to get the watch fixed within the loop to stop it.
22	22	"The Cyborgs"	Simon Lecocq	Victor Ianni	10 June 2018
Another invention of Toybos, this time an AI named Zimbra, has gone rogue and begins replacing humans with robotic duplicates. When Nate and Malika stumble upon the plot, they have to stop her before she takes over the city.
23	23	"The Mummy"	David Witt	Gaultier Buiret	17 June 2018
Nate and Malika arrive at the museum early for a class field trip. Nate notices the backdoor open and Malika and he venture inside where they find two thieves named Boris and Clementine robbing in the place. In midst of the scuffle, a mystical amulet activates and brings the mummy of Queen Pshut to life.
24	24	"Grandpa"	Alice Deiner	Althea Aseoche	17 June 2018
While racing against each other to school, the duo bump into an elderly woman by accident. However she turns out to be a witch and, slighted by the action, curses the two to be elderly themselves. They now must find a way to find her to reverse the transformation in their aged state, helped along by Nate's grandfather.
25	25	"The Candy Factory"	Sam Meikle	Morade Rahni	23 June 2018
Nate and Malika happen upon a new candy store that makes delicious sweets. Curious how they can be so good, they sneak inside and find a factory below run by gnomes who are being forced to work for the shopkeeper due to holding their hats (the source of the magic) hostage, prompting the duo to help them out.
26	26	"The Video Game"	David Evans	Victor Ianni	23 June 2018
Nate and Malika become characters in a video game made real. If they can't get to the middle of the maze of drains underneath the city, they might become pixelated avatars forever.
27	27	"The Pirate"	Augustin Mas and Stéphanie Tallon	Benjamin Vatré	23 June 2018
Malika shows Nate a telescope that she found in her attic. It belonged to her great-great-great grandmother, and it contains a map to a treasure hidden somewhere in town.
28	28	"The City in the Sky"	Maël Le Mée and Raphaelle Rio	Joseph Herbelin	23 June 2018
On their way to school, Nate and Malika see a rope ladder dangling down from the sky. They decide to climb it and they are amazed to discover a flying city, hidden in the clouds.
29	29	"The Living Paintings"	Fiona Leibgorin	Victor Ianni	23 June 2018
Nate and Malika have arrived early for their class visit to the museum, and they are pulled into the mysterious world of paintings.
30	30	"The Tree People"	Maël Le Mée and Raphaelle Rio	Althea Aseoche	23 June 2018
As they cross through the park to go to school, Nate and Malika find Violet weeping next to an old tree.
31	31	"The Lucky Ring"	Augustin Mas and Stéphanie Tallon	Joseph Herbelin	24 June 2018
The duo come across a construction worker named Griselda who offers Nate a "lucky" ring that she needs help pulling off her finger. He succeeds and takes possession of it and indeed, many lucky occurrences happen to him. But the luck suddenly goes bad to the point where it becomes harmful to Nate, prompting the duo to find out what's going on and get the ring off of him.
32	32	"The Faun"	Jane Schneider	Ophélie Mahé	24 June 2018
The duo realize the park's statue of a faun is missing and find some prints leading away from the pedestal. Following it, they come across a party of various fauns, one of whom is named Dion who explains that he and the other fauns have come to life from the statue state for a week. He is the party's host and proclaims Nate and Malika as "entertainment". But when they prove to be a hit with the guests, Dion wishes for the two to stay longer than intended.
33	33	"The Ninja"	Augustin Mas and Stéphanie Tallan	Victor Ianni	30 June 2018
Nate and Malika meet Jin, a ninja who offers to train them. In order to become a master, he needs to prove he has students.
34	34	"The Magic Shoes"	Marie Manand	Althea Aseoche	30 June 2018
It is Track and Field Day at the school, though Nate isn't looking forward to it. He tries to claim he left his running shoes at home. But Malika prompts him to put on some spare shoes she finds at the track. However they force Nate to run nonstop. A fellow classmate reveals he had brought them to compete feeling he lacked the skills to do so, so he and Malika must work together to get the shoes off Nate.
35	35	"The Great Ape"	Simon Lecocq	Althea Aseoche	30 June 2018
Another adventurous experience seems to be on the cards for Nate and Malika as they cross paths with Willy, a runaway orangutan who could use their help.
36	36	"The Shooting Star"	Simon Lecocq	Manny Banados	30 June 2018
While trying to get to school before sunrise, a shooting star named Kappa Ceti falls near the duo. She pleads for their help when a bigger star named Alpha Tauri comes looking for her, intent on absorbing her light.
37	37	"The Battle of the Gods"	Alice Diener	Morade Rahni	30 June 2018
A storm strikes the neighborhood this morning. Trying to take shelter, Nate and Malika discover its cause: the Greek gods are arguing over which of them deserves to rule over Mount Olympus.
38	38	"The Totems"	Zoé Guiet	Benjamin Vatré	30 June 2018
Nate and Malika are surprised to come across Mrs. Rainfort, Maurice, and Violet all in bad moods. They come across a shaman who explains something is agitating everyone's spirit animals in the spirit realm which is affecting their demeanors. The duo offer to aid him in going into said realm to find and stop the culprit.
39	39	"The Gingerbread Man"	Cyril Deydier	Victor Ianni	29 July 2018
On the way to school, Nate and Malika save a talking gingerbread man from a cat. But the little biscuit boy isn't very grateful, steals Nate's chili pepper, and ends up running into a house owned by a giant ogre. While his creator/mother, Josette, comes looking for him, the duo help out to make sure both come out safely.
40	40	"The Cave Girl"	Juliette Bas	Benjamin Vatré	29 July 2018
Nate and Malika meet a girl named Oona who is from the Stone Age and slipped into the present time period through a portal opened by Professor Toybos. What's more, she starts taking a liking to Maurice, forcing the duo to try and help him as well as get Oona back to her rightful time.
41	41	"The Flash"	Maël Le Mée and Raphaelle Rio	Ophélie Mahé	5 August 2018
The duo comes across an odd camera that, when it takes a picture, creates a living negative of that person, which exhibits the opposite traits of their original. However, Terry ends up snatching the camera away from them. The duo work to get it back, but are hampered by Terry's negative who is friendly but clumsy.
42	42	"The Spore"	David Witt	Morade Rahni	5 August 2018
Violet is unwell, so Nate and Malika take her to Professor Toybos. He surmises that Violet has ingested the spore of a rare plant that is turning her into a plant!
43	43	"The Dream"	Peter Saisselin	Morade Rahni	12 August 2018
Malika must save Nate when he gets stuck in a dream where he is chased by gigantic numbers.
44	44	"The Wolf"	Augustin Mas and Stéphanie Tallon	Althea Aseoche	12 August 2018
A huge beast has ransacked Cosmo's kiosk, so Nate and Malika decide to investigate. Eventually, they find out the beast is actually a young woman named Pat who just happens to be a werewolf that was suppressing the transformation with an amulet but has lost it and now changes at the smell of food. Nate ends up scratched in the encounter, forcing him and Malika to find the amulet to bring Pat back to normal before he transforms completely.
45	45	"The Gremlins"	Sam Meikle	Ophélie Mahé	19 August 2018
Nate and Malika come across a pair of gremlins who are planning a prank that will engulf the city in sewage. Our heroes must turn the tables on the pranksters to save the city.
46	46	"King Nate"	Jane Schneider	Gener Ocampo	19 August 2018
Nate is mistaken for a visiting king, and while he is performing the king's official duties with no clue what to do, Malika discovers that the real king has gone into hiding.
47	47	"The Dinosaur"	David Witt	Benjamin Vatré	26 August 2018
Professor Toybos invents a special spray that turns animals into dinosaurs. Nate accidentally squirts Maurice with the dinosaur DNA spray, which turns the boy into a T-Rex.
48	48	"The Concert"	David Evans	Althea Aseoche	26 August 2018
Malika's favorite singer is doing a charity concert in the park, but his voice is stolen. When Nate confronts him, his own voice is replaced by chicken sounds.
49	49	"The Snow Fairy"	Jean-Christophe Hervé and Cédric Perrin	Manny Banados	2 September 2018
Nate needs a birthday present for his mother and finds a snow globe with a fairy from Cosmo. However, when it ends up busted, it releases an actual snow fairy inside who was trapped in it by humans. She then proceeds to start freezing everything in sight as a way of "fun", forcing the duo to try and stop her.
50	50	"The Unicorn"	Alice Diener	Morade Rahni	2 September 2018
Nate and Malika discover that a unicorn which is living in the park is able to control people's minds with his horn, and he uses it on Nate and Malika in order to make them do his bidding.
51	51	"The Invaders"	Simon Lecocq	Joseph Herbelin	9 September 2018
52	52	"The Invaders"	Simon Lecocq	Victor Ianni	9 September 2018
Nate and Malika actually manage to make it on time with no problem on the last day of school to their and Principal Prudence's surprise. All seems well... until they end up kidnapped by aliens who try to tap their memories to invade Earth. After they escape, the aliens launch a premature invasion necessitating Nate and Malika to call on all their friends they made through the season to help fend them off.

=== Season 2 (2022) ===
No. overall	No. in season	Title	Written by	Storyboarded by	Original air date
53	1	"The Lady of the Lake"	Augustin Mas and Stéphanie Tallon	Théophile Laurent	31 January 2022
Nate and Malika meet a lady turned into water centuries ago by an ancient curse, and trapped in the lake for all eternity.
54	2	"The Thunderbird"	Juliette Bas	Édouard Kuchiman	1 February 2022
Nate and Malika run into an ornithologist who is trying to prove the existence of the legendary thunderbird.
55	3	"The Crocodile Man"	Thomas Personeni	Stéphanie Russo	2 February 2022
Nate and Malika meet a reporter investigating a crocodile-man hiding in the town's sewers. Things get complicated when a REAL crocodile appears!
56	4	"The Golem"	Thomas Personeni	Gaultier Buiret	3 February 2022
Nate and Malika meet Easter, an alchemist chasing after the clay Golem she created. Nate and Malika have to save it from the alchemist, who wants to destroy her creature!
57	5	"The Hairdresser"	Augustin Mas and Stéphanie Tallon	Alexis Wemaere	4 February 2022
On their way to school, Nate and Malika meet a hairdresser who has invented a spray that makes people's hair grow incredibly fast.
58	6	"The Mood Enhancer"	Simon Lecocq	Théophile Laurent	7 February 2022
Nate and Malika discover that a crazy inventor has decided to eradicate bad moods by altering everyone's brain against their will. Nate and Malika have to stop him!
59	7	"The Chess Game"	Théophile Laurent	Théophile Laurent	8 February 2022
Nate and Malika discover an old chess game in Cosmo's shop. But as Malika tries to teach Nate the rules, the pieces suddenly come to life and restart their centuries-old fight!
60	8	"The Drone"	Wagner Cardeňa	Stéphanie Russo	9 February 2022
Pedro is winning over the inhabitants with his super-sophisticated delivery drone... but Nate and Malika find out that he's stealing his goods from Cosmo's shop!
61	9	"The Astronaut"	Zoé Guiet	Gaultier Buiret	10 February 2022
Nate and Malika meet Cleo, an astronaut who has been ejected from the space station where she works with her fellow researcher. To help, our heroes embark on a space mission!
62	10	"The Gorgon"	Renaud Besse-Bourdier	Alexis Wemaere	11 February 2022
Nate and Malika meet Stheno, a gorgon sculptor who can turn people into stone with her third eye! When she turns Maurice into a sculpture, our heroes get in her way.
63	11	"The Dimensional Rift"	Caroline Torelli	Gaspard Sumeire	28 February 2022
Nate comes across Professor Toybos being chased by a rival scientist, who locks him up in a dimensional rift... and Nate with him! While Malika tries to stop Toybos's rival, Nate and Toybos have to find a way to communicate with her from the rift to help her.
64	12	"The Reptilians"	Claire Dufresne	Alexis Wemaere	28 February 2022
Suzaris is a reptilian who has emerged from a fault line in the ground to explore the human world. She befriends Nate and Malika but the rift that she has opened is causing earthquakes and threatens to swallow the town.
65	13	"The Enchanted Bracelet"	Simon Lecocq	Théophile Navet	1 March 2022
While heading to school, the duo nearly run into Hazel (the witch from "The Grandpa") and try to avoid offending her, only to find out it is Maurice in her body. He explains she stole his with a magical bracelet to enjoy youth again. The duo set out to find her and return Maurice body, but things quickly get complicated when they experience the bracelet's effects themselves.
66	14	"The Ink Thief"	Simon Lecocq	Gaultier Buiret	1 March 2022
Nate and Malika meet Joanna, a famous novelist who has writer's block and uses a magic pen to write for her! But for the pen to work, she has to feed it texts and it soon takes on a mind of its own with malicious intentions.
67	15	"The Tiki"	Yann Ropars	Théophile Laurent	2 March 2022
The town receives a gift from Polynesia: a Tiki, a sacred volcanic stone statue. But suddenly, the Tiki becomes alive and threatens to unleash its devastating power on the city!
68	16	"The Puppet"	Wagner Cardeña	Cédric Guarneri	2 March 2022
Nate and Malika meet Garett, a ventriloquist's magical puppet, who pranks unsuspecting people. Nate is a huge fan of Garett's, but he and Malika soon find his pranks hurtful.
69	17	"The Mandrake"	Augustin Mas and Stéphanie Tallon	Victor Ianni	3 March 2022
As Nate and Malika gather plants in the park to fill the herbarium they need for a school assignment, Nate mistakenly unearths a mandrake whose cries can control nearby plant-life and threatens to envelop the entire city if the duo can't calm it down.
70	18	"The Pendulum"	Claire Dufresne	Stéphanie Russo	3 March 2022
Malika falls under the spell of a magic pendulum held by Marvo the Hypnotist. Under his influence, she steals a precious diamond from the museum and gives it to Marvo! But he turns out to be under a hypnosis as well and reveals that Igor (from "The Secret Agent") is behind things, having stolen his pendulum to commit crimes.
71	19	"The Sphinx"	Théophile Laurent	Théophile Laurent	4 March 2022
In the town's Roman ruins, Nate and Malika discover a secret passage which leads them to a Sphinx! She offers them legendary treasure if they can answer her riddles correctly.
72	20	"The Vampires"	David Evans	Victor Ianni	4 March 2022
Nate and Malika meet friendly a vampire named Winifred. His classmate Harmony has evil intentions, and soon our heroes have to face a blood-thirsty vampire queen returning from limbo!
73	21	"The Giant Fish"	Jonathan Evans	Théophile Navet	7 March 2022
Nate and Malika get swallowed by a giant fish! Inside the fish they find Maxime Dermy, the unscrupulous animal trafficker who has been swallowed too! Forcing the three to work together and find a way out.
74	22	"The Wedding Dress"	Margherita Mauro	Stéphanie Russo	7 March 2022
Nate and Malika stumble upon a magic wedding dress that's bringing clothes to life... and the wedding dress falls in love with Nate's new bow-tie, dragging him along! Chloe (from "The Enchanted Frog") returns revealing it is her dress she accidentally animated with a spell and needs the duo's help to stop it from bringing other clothes to life as well.
75	23	"The Home Spirit"	Stéphanie Tallon	Cédric Guarneri	8 March 2022
A poltergeist moves into Malika's house and starts wrecking it! Only Malika's "home spirit" can get rid of him, but it was living in the bread bin that she just threw away.
76	24	"The Great Pili-Pala"	Claire Espagno	Stéphanie Russo	8 March 2022
Tako, a squid-man, wants to free the Great Pili-Pala. Nate and Malika must work with the Mermaid Queen and stop the ancient monster before it makes the water rise and floods the entire city!
77	25	"The Endless Recess"	Vladimir Haulet and Alice Diener	Victor Ianni	9 March 2022
Nate and Malika arrive at school on time! They can enjoy the morning recess for once. But while playing hopscotch, they awake a strange spirit dressed like a Harlequin who wishes to play...forever.
78	26	"The Chicken Cop"	Renaud Besse-Bourdier and Simon Lecocq	Théophile Laurent	9 March 2022
A robot policeman with a chicken head replaces Policeman Dwayne! Depressed, Dwayne decides to retire. But soon, the Chicken Cop malfunctions and starts wreaking havoc!
79	27	"The Kitsune"	Melanie Alexander	Victor Ianni	2 May 2022
Kitsu, a young Kitsu, a young Japanese Kitsune, is stealing food and causing mayhem. But there's worse: the fox has aroused the wrath of a dragon spirit who now threatens to destroy the town!
80	28	"The Collector"	Simon Lecocq	Gaspard Sumeire	3 May 2022
Nils, a collector of magic game cards, turns Melanie, the town's mailwoman, into a character in his game! To free her, Nate and Malika have to challenge him and win the game!
81	29	"The Kappa"	Claire Dufresne and Oriane Vittu de Kerraoul	Stéphanie Russo	4 May 2022
Nate and Malika rescue a kappa, a creature who lives in the park's pond. The creature decides it has to repay them as a debt of honor, but its attempts to help them go wrong...
82	30	"The Beanstalk"	Stéphanie Tallon	Théophile Navet	5 May 2022
A rain of stones is threatening to wreck Nate and Malika's neighbourhood, because there's a war going on... in the kingdom of giants, up above the clouds!
83	31	"The Demigod's Test"	Baptiste Renard	Viravong Chanthapanya	6 May 2022
Today is the School Olympics! At the stadium Nate and Malika meet Chloros, a frail looking demigod who has to prove to his father, Zeus, that he is a great athlete.
84	32	"The Glitch"	Wagner Cardeña	Gaspard Sumeire	9 May 2022
Nate and Maurice have fun playing a VR video game until they accidentally release the evil AI, Zimbra (from "The Cyborgs"), that turns Maurice into a computer virus and starts affecting reality! The duo work with Toybos to try and stop her plans to turn the whole world digital.
85	33	"The Tiny Tops"	Margherita Mauro	Paul Hervé	10 May 2022
Nate finds a tiny figurine in the street belonging to the King of the Tiny Tops. Furious that his statue was stolen, the King wages war against our heroes.
86	34	"The Magician's Top Hat"	Jonathan Evans	Théophile Navet	11 May 2022
Nate and Malika meet Fluffy, a talking rabbit! He needs their help, because the magical world where he lives is being threatened by Jack Flash, the evil magician.
87	35	"The Chromapix"	Théophile Laurent	Théophile Laurent	12 May 2022
Nate and Malika discover that the neighbourhood is being painted grey by a Necropix, a space creature who hates colours. Luckily, a young Chromapix arrives to stop it!
88	36	"The Gingerbread Family"	Vladimir Haulet and Baptiste Renard	Cédric Guarneri	13 May 2022
On the way to school, Nate and Malika run into tiny gingerbread creatures who are causing mayhem in town. Investigating leads them to another encounter with Ivan who seeks to us the candy factory to make himself a new gingerbread brother.
89	37	"The Alphabet Agency"	Vladimir Haulet and Simon Lecocq	Hélène Sauvagnat	16 May 2022
Nate and Malika cross paths with the superheroine Miracle Girl once more when a secret agent arrives to arrest her! Quickly they discover that she's the victim of a conspiracy engineered by a past foe of hers.
90	38	"The Wild Beasts"	Augustin Mas and Jérémy Elsair	Théophile Navet	17 May 2022
Nate and Malika run into Maurice, who is half transformed into a hamster! They take him to their friend Pat, the werewolf vet, but Pat has problems of her own in the form of her recently appointed village chief who distrusts humans and wants Pat to come home. Forcing her hand with a magical moonstone that can turn people into animals if she refuses. The three team up to reverse the effects and try to convince him not all humans are bad.
91	39	"The Return of the Cuddly Toys"	Vladimir Haulet, Hadrien Krasker, and Matthieu Bockenhove	Stéphanie Russo	18 May 2022
Nate and Malika run into Brian, Santa's reindeer, who needs their help at the North Pole: Santa's in danger from Stan, his evil brother!
92	40	"The Race Car"	Jérôme Lefévère and Tom Gobart	Paul Hervé	19 May 2022
Nate and Malika find an old racing car hidden in a dead-end. Our heroes try to help her find her former owner, but they're chased by someone who wants to sell her for scrap!
93	41	"Inside Professor Toybos"	Vladimir Haulet and Claire Espagno	Victor Ianni	20 May 2022
Professor Toybos is in danger: he seems to have lost his mind. So Nate and Malika use his latest invention to get inside his brain and convince his logical side to return to his post before his passion and hatred sides do irreparable damage to Toybos's mind!
94	42	"The Asteroid"	Augustin Mas and Wagner Cardeña	Théophile Laurent	23 May 2022
Nate accidentally breaks his solar system project and Malika and he visit Professor Toybos to get it fixed, only for his house to blast off into space once they go inside. Toybos reveals he's going to an asteroid to mine for a rare mineral that can power devices. The duo accompany him on his mission but find that his rival, Felding (from "The Dimensional Rift"), is also there as well, leading to a confrontation.
95	43	"The Time Travellers"	Simon Lecocq	Victor Ianni and Théophile Laurent	24 May 2022
Nate and Malika are reunited with Asgord as he chases a thief that stole his time traveling hoverboard who seeks to steal animals from their timeline and preserve them in his own collection. The three work together to stop him but a mistake by Nate threatens to destroy all time.
96	44	"The Nebulons"	Jérôme Lefévère and Tom Gobart	Paul Hervé	25 May 2022
On their way to school, Nate and Malika run into Billy, the shepherd of the City in the Sky, who is looking for his herd of Nebulons. These funny, cloudy sheep are the main source of water in the city, so he needs to bring them back as soon. But they run into trouble with a Nebulon rustler named Carla looking to steal them for her own ends.
97	45	"The Witches' Convention"	Baptiste Renard	Théophile Laurent	26 May 2022
The duo stumble upon a convention attended by witches. They convince them to let the pair stay but the duo end up framed for a crime they didn't commit and must find the culprit before the witches punish them.
98	46	"The Kobolds"	Jonathan Evans	Viravong Chanthapanya	27 May 2022
On their way to school, Nate and Malika fall into a tunnel where they meet a group of Kobolds who are digging tunnels under the city. But when their giant pet mole starts to tunnel unusually fast, the town's foundations become unstable.
99	47	"The Superstars"	Simon Lecocq	Stéphanie Russo	30 May 2022
The duo head out early due to Malika wanting to stop by the theater to audition for a talent show. However, they come across a talent manager named Betty who uses a magic wand to brainwash Malika into a pop star so she can create pop star duo called S2 and become rich and famous. Nate must enter the audition himself to get Malika back to normal, aided by Maurice and his dance moves.
100	48	"The Goblin's Cousin"	Vladimir Haulet and Oriane Vittu de Kerraoul	Paul Hervé	30 May 2022
A putrid smell is going through the town. Nate and Malika track it to the sewers where they reunite with the goblin, Pimple, who explains the smell is coming from his cousin who has moved into the city but refuses to take a bath and hates anything hygienic. Nate, Malika and Pimple must find a way to clean him and convince him that the smell is affecting others.
101	49	"The Golden Crown"	Augustin Mas and Stéphanie Tallon	Théophile Navet	31 May 2022
At the museum, Nate and Malika run into Boris and Clementine (from "The Mummy") again, and to stop them from stealing the precious golden crown of an Inca emperor. But when Nate and Boris, who wore the crown, start turning everything they touch into gold, the duo realize the crown is cursed and, along with Clementine, have to find a way to reverse it before Boris's greed turns the whole town golden.
102	50	"The Scarecrow"	Augustin Mas and Baptiste Renard	Stéphanie Russo	31 May 2022
Nate and Malika encounter Noctis, small black creatures that gather in cities to plunge its inhabitants them into darkness. Fortunately, Jack the Scarecrow comes along to chase them away.
103	51	"The Banana Peel"	Oriane Vittu de Kerraoul	Théophile Navet	1 June 2022
104	52	"The Banana Peel"	Vladimir Haulet	Stéphanie Russo and Gaultier Buiret	1 June 2022
Nate and Malika help Ben, the banana peel, get his powers back, but he betrays them. Instead of using his powers to become human, he takes revenge on humanity by turning the town into a magic realm, exposing all the magical beings the duo encountered over the series. In order to combat him, Nate and Malika must team with the Alphabet Agency and all their allies before he completely takes over the world.

=== Season 3 (2025–26) ===
No. overall	No. in season	Title	Written by	Storyboarded by	Original air date
105	1	"The Reality Show"	Édouard Kuchiman	Édouard Kuchiman	12 April 2025
Nate and Malika have been kidnapped by aliens fascinated by their morning adventures. Quotax, the producer of Galactic TV, is so impressed that he wants to make a show with them as the stars! Nate isn't interested at all and just wants to escape, but Malika, still upset about losing the class elections the day before, wants to stay in this place where everyone seems to adore her...
106	2	"The Books"	Édouard Kuchiman and Jean Méranger-Galtier	Édouard Kuchiman and Alexis Wemaere	19 April 2025
It's chaos at the library this morning: all the characters have escaped from their books and have come to life in the real world... including Johnny Cross and Leviah, Nate and Malika's favorite heroes! Unfortunately, the two are arguing and refuse to work together. And when their archenemies, Dr. Spectre and King Arie, also emerge from the books, things start to get even more complicated...
107	3	"The Blue Rose"	Baptiste Renard and Édouard Kuchiman	Victor Ianni	5 April 2025
Fahim, the former genie of the lamp, is feeling down. He wants to give his beloved Mrs. Rainfort a blue rose, just like in her favorite Arabian Nights tale! Following Nate's idea, the genie takes them into the magical world of the story. Together, they have to complete several challenges to find the blue rose... but it seems like these challenges have another purpose...
108	4	"The Friendship Bracelet"	TBD	TBA	2026
109	5	"The Valkyrie"	TBD	TBA	2026
110	6	"Boss Terry"	TBD	TBA	2026
111	7	"Cosmo's Bazar"	TBD	TBA	2026
112	8	"The Daruma"	TBD	TBA	2026
113	9	"The Snowman"	TBD	TBA	2026
