= Crunch Time =

Crunch time may refer to:

- Crunch Time (album), a 1999 album by saxophonist Hank Crawford and organist Jimmy McGriff
- Crunch Time (TV series), an Australian television series
- Crunch Time (web series), an American web television series
- Crunch Time (play), an Australian play by David Williamson

== See also ==
- Shturmovshchina, the Russian equivalent of "crunch time"
- Crunch (video games), a time period in which video game developers are expected to work overtime
