= Surprises! =

- Genre: pre-school
- Starring: James Buckingham; Laura Murphy; Hugo Chiarella
- Country of origin: Australia
- Original language: English
- No. of seasons: 3

Production
- Running time: 30 minutes
- Production company: Ambience Entertainment

Original release
- Network: Nine Network (2012); 9Go! (2013-2015, 2018-2020)
- Release: 14 October 2012 – 26 December 2014

Related
- Magical Tales

Surprises! is an Australian pre-school children's television series which first aired on the Nine Network on 14 October 2012. It then aired on the network's 9GO! channel.

It was produced by Ambience Entertainment and was a spin-off series from William & Sparkles' Magical Tales, another show now airs on 9GO!

Surprises! is set in a stylised travelling space contraption where William the Wizard and Sparkles the Fairy are joined by their courier friend, Digby Dash. Together the team lead a group of pre-schoolers as each new episode uncovers a daily surprise.
