= Brisbane Festival =

International arts festival

- Genre: Major arts, theatre, music and cultural festival
- Frequency: Annual
- Locations: Brisbane, Queensland
- Country: Australia
- Inaugurated: 1996
- Organiser: Brisbane City Council; Queensland Government
- Website: brisbanefestival.com.au

Brisbane Festival is one of Australia's leading international arts festivals, and is held each September in Brisbane, Australia.

Its presence dominates the city for three weeks in September and its line-up of classical and contemporary music, theatre, dance, comedy, opera, circus and major public events such as Riverfire attracts an audience of around one million people every year.

In 2019, Artistic Director David Berthold transformed the Festival into Australia's largest major international arts festival, presenting more works to more people than any other.

== History ==
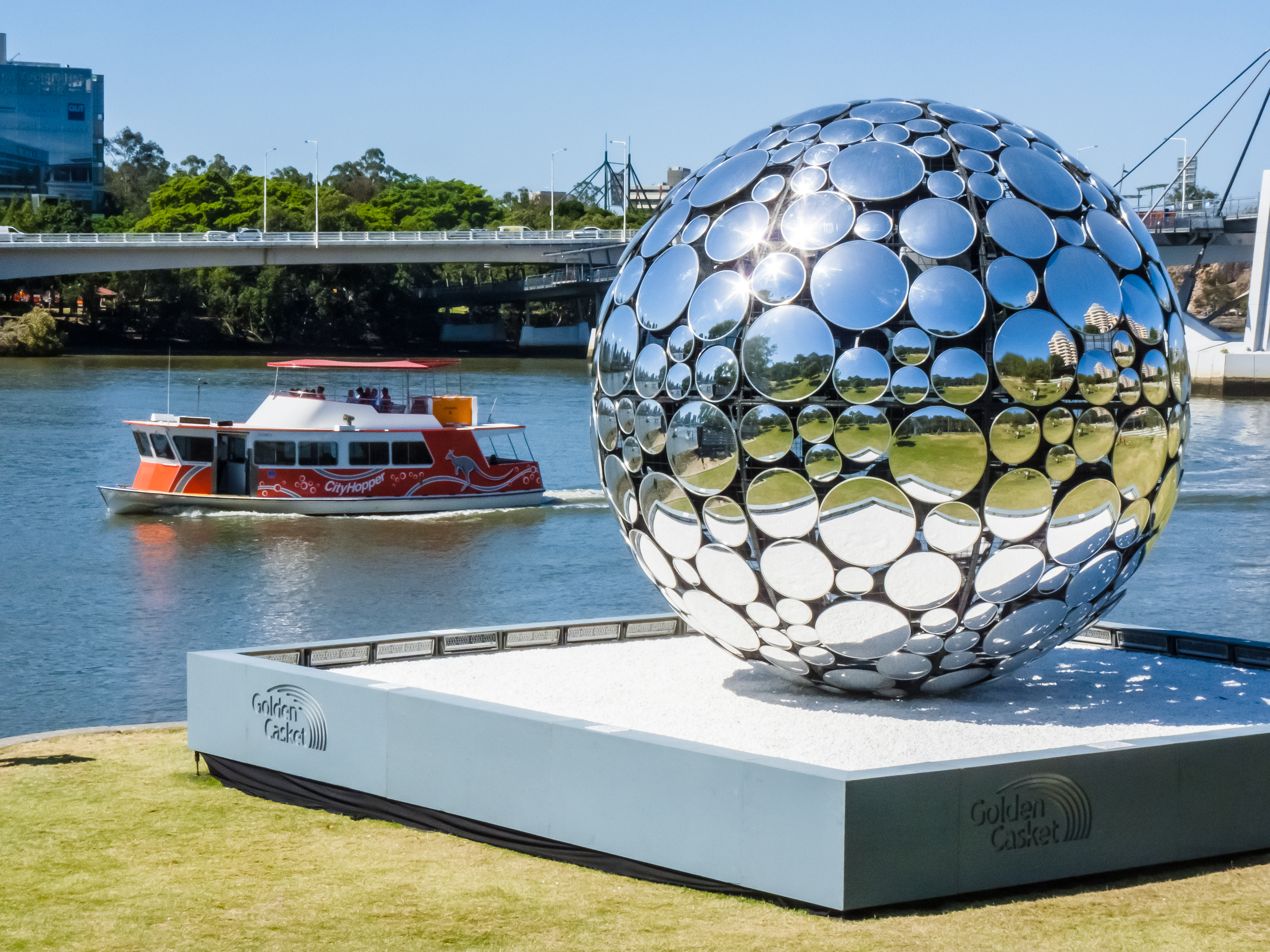
Brisbane Festival Mirror Ball, 2012

Brisbane Festival was first held in 1996 as a joint initiative of the Queensland Government and Brisbane City Council, intended to foster the arts. The festival evolved from Brisbane's Warana Festival, first held in 1962 following on from the successful Centenary of Celebrations in 1959. The Warana Festival was an annual Spring extravaganza which included a 2 hour parade through the city streets featuring decorated floats, marching girls, entertainers, and bands, under the blue Brisbane skies. Warana, which is an Aboriginal word for "blue skies", endured until the early 1990s and was eventually transformed into the more sophisticated Brisbane Festival of today.

Originally held biennially, Brisbane Festival became an annual event in 2009 when it merged with Riverfire. The festival has had five artistic directors; Tony Gould (1996–2004), Lyndon Terracini (2006–2009), Noel Staunton (2010–2014), David Berthold (2015–2019) and Louise Bezzina (2020–2025).

In 2009, the opera Miracle in Brisbane by the Italian composer Giorgio Battistelli was performed at the Judith Wright Centre of Contemporary Arts. Directed by Rhoda Roberts with Deborah Mailman as assistant director, the opera was performed by an Aboriginal and Torres Strait Islander cast, including Mailman, Aaron Fa'aoso, Djakapurra Munyarrayan, and Casey Donovan.

The 2016 event featured 3D street art.

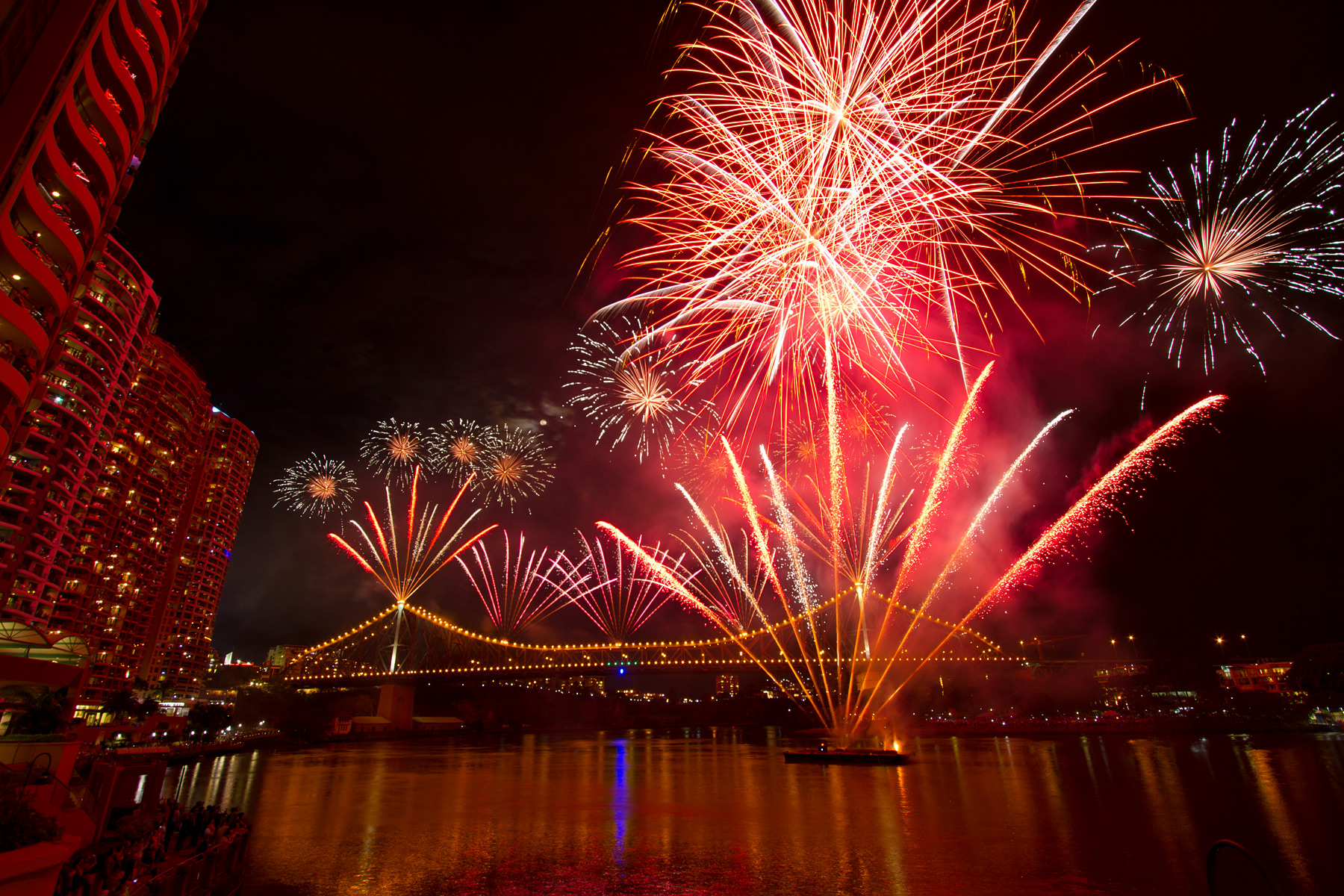
Riverfire in 2012

The 2020 festival was estimated to have generated $14 million into the Brisbane economy. Because of the pandemic Riverfire was excluded from the event in 2020.

In 2021, the theme for the festival was Brightly Brisbane. It featured light installations in several locations.

== See also ==
- List of festivals in Brisbane
- List of festivals in Australia
