= Crunch Time (TV series) =

Australian children's lifestyle television series

- Genre: Children's, Lifestyle
- Starring: Nick Vindin; Alice Zaslavsky
- Country of origin: Australia
- Original language: English
- No. of seasons: 2
- No. of episodes: 130

Production
- Executive producers: Monica O'Brien; Matthew Boughen
- Running time: 24 minutes

Original release
- Network: 9Go!
- Release: 16 May 2016 – 23 June 2018

Crunch Time is an Australian children's lifestyle television series produced by Ambience Entertainment which first aired on 9Go! on 16 May 2016. The series promotes healthy living, featuring cooking, sports and young guests. It is hosted by Nick Vindin and Alice Zaslavsky. The series airs weekdays at 7:30 am on 9Go!.

== Format ==
Crunch Time is a lifestyle program for the tween audience. Hosts Alice Zaslavsky (MasterChef Australia, Kitchen Whiz) and Nick Vindin (Move It, SBS TV) are joined by two young guests each episode, children aged between 11 and 13, who join them for the course of the show. The children discuss their special talents, hobbies and interests, or share stories. The guests later join the hosts to create a healthy recipe in the kitchen, and then participate in a backyard sport or activity. The series has an emphasis in promoting healthy living, eating and being active.

Other segments in the show include a Word of the Day, a R.A.D. ("Really Awesome-ly Difficult" or variation) Word, which the hosts may attempt to use throughout the course of the episode. At the end of each show, the guests must either smell, touch or taste a mystery object in the Cube of Curiosity and attempt to guess what is inside. The guests are also asked a thought-provoking question each episode.

Crunch Time is set in a colourful backyard, designed as a hangout for tweens. An outdoor Kitchen is featured, along with a grassy Turf and a Hang Out with couch style seating.

== Production ==
The series premiered on 9Go! on 16 May 2016, airing 7:30 am weekdays. The first series contained 65 episodes and concluded in August.

Vindin is credited as a writer and Zaslavsky as an associate producer of the food segment.

== See also ==
- List of Australian television series
