= Actors' & Entertainers' Benevolent Fund of Queensland =

Registered charity for artists

- Founded: 1975
- Founder: Alan Edwards AM MBE
- Purpose: Assisting Performing Arts Professionals
- Location: South Brisbane, Queensland, Australia
- Region served: Queensland, Australia
- Key people: Michael Balk JP (president); Oliver Samson (vice president); Michael Mandalios (treasurer); En Rui Foo (secretary); Tim Fairfax AC (patron)
- Website: www.abfqld.com.au

The Actors' & Entertainers' Benevolent Fund of Queensland (Inc) is a registered charity assisting actors, performers, and entertainers in times of dire circumstance. It is commonly known as the Actors' Benevolent Fund, ABF QLD, and The Fund. The Fund is run by an elected committee of industry professionals, with Michael Balk JP as the current president.

== History ==
The Fund was started by Alan Edwards AM MBE in 1975. Charities of this kind have been operating across the world for over a century, including the Actors' Benevolent Fund of NSW and the Victorian Actors' Benevolent Fund.

The Actors' Benevolent Fund of NSW, of which Don Crosby was the serving president, provided a donation of $500 to seed the charity.

Alan Edwards AM MBE, a prominent figure in local performing arts who was the first artistic director of the established Queensland Theatre Company in 1970, was the inaugural president of the charity. Edwards served in that role until 1994.

== Lifetime Achievement Award ==
The Fund presents an industry award to recognise excellence and lifetime achievement in the arts in Queensland. It is named in honour of the founding president Alan Edwards. The first award was recognised in 2002.

=== Recipients of the Alan Edwards Lifetime Achievement Award ===
Award Recipients
Year	Name	Occupation
2002	Leo Wockner	Actor/Union Activist
2003	Carol Burns	Actor/Director
2004	Errol O'Neill	Actor/Playwright
2005	Kaye Stevenson	Actor
2006	Rod Horton	Arts Administrator
2007	Penny Everingham	Actor/Puppeteer
2008	Dr Tony Gould AM	Arts Administrator
2009	Joan Whalley OAM	Arts Administrator
2010	June Craw OAM	Arts Administrator
2011	NO AWARD	NO AWARD
2012	Brian Tucker CPA	Arts Supporter/Advocate
2013	Dianne Eden OAM	Teacher/Mentor
2014	Jim Vilé	Artistic Director/Teacher
2015	Michael Forde Margery Forde	Actor/Playwright/Director Actor/Playwright/Director
2016	Sue Rider	Artistic Director/Dramaturg
2017	Robby Nason	Arts Administrator/Costume Designer
2018	David Walters	Lighting Designer/Mentor
2019	Sue Benner	Arts Administrator/Director/Writer
2020	Kate Foy	Actor/Director/Educator
2021	Roxanne McDonald	Actor
2022	Paul Dellit OAM	Actor/Mentor/Producer
