= Nate Is Late =

French children's series

- The show's title.
- Genre: Comedy; Fantasy
- Created by: Sylvain Huchet; Peter Saisselin
- Directed by: Jérémy Guiter (seasons 1–2); Édouard Kuchiman (seasons 2–3); Gaultier Buiret (season 3)
- Creative directors: David Maingault; Antoine Birot
- Voices of: Jane U'Brien; Sarah Aubrey; Keith Scott; Jillian O'Dowd (season 1); André de Vanny (season 1); Ariane Sallis (season 2)
- Composers: Nathalie Loriot; Franck Hedin
- Countries of origin: France; Australia (season 1)
- Original languages: French; English
- No. of seasons: 3
- No. of episodes: 156 (list of episodes)

Production
- Executive producers: Karen Horne (season 1); Elaine Beckett (season 1); Hannah Rosenhain (season 1); Jo Rooney (season 1); Andy Ryan (season 1)
- Producers: Philippe Alessandri; Sylvain Huchet (seasons 2–3)
- Editors: Ivy Buirette (seasons 1–2); Rémi Bancourt (season 3)
- Running time: 11 minutes
- Production companies: Watch Next Media; Nate is Late Productions (season 1) Safari de Ville (season 2)

Original release
- Network: France 4, France 3 and Canal J (France); 9Go! (Australia); Super RTL (Germany); Ketnet (Belgium)
- Release: 26 March 2018 – present

Nate Is Late (French: Oscar et Malika, toujours en retard, lit. 'Oscar and Malika, always late') is an animated television series created by Sylvain Huchet and Peter Saisselin. The series is produced by Watch Next Media and Nate is Late Productions (season 1), with the participation of France Télévisions, Super RTL, Nine Network (season 1), Ketnet (season 1) and Canal J (season 2), and distributed by KidsFirst. The series originally aired on France 4, Super RTL, and 9Go!.

A second season was confirmed by the production companies of the series. A third season is currently in production, in honor of the series' 5th anniversary, and premiered on YouTube on 5 April 2025.

== Premise ==
Every morning, Nate and Malika go to school, but get sidetracked on adventures that make them late. When they finally arrive at school, Principal Prudence almost always chooses to not believe their stories.

== Episodes ==
Series	Episodes	Originally released		
Series	Episodes	First released	Last released	Network
1	52	26 May 2018	9 September 2018	9Go!
2	52	31 January 2022	1 June 2022	Pop
3	52	5 April 2025	TBA	YouTube

== Broadcast ==
The series was produced for broadcast on France.TV (France), Super RTL (Germany), 9Go! (Australia, season 1), and YouTube (international, season 3). In addition, the series airs on Pop and Tiny Pop and is slated to premiere on CBBC and BBC iPlayer on 1st September 2026. (UK), Cartoon Network (India) and Discovery Kids (MENA).

A second season premiered on RTS 1 in Switzerland on 27 August 2021.

== Reception ==
Fernanda Camargo of Common Sense Media gave the series three stars out of five, describing it as a "fun buddy comedy... full of fantasy, thin on lessons."
