= Move It (game show) =

- Genre: Game show; Children
- Created by: John Donaldson
- Written by: Matthew Boughen; Lisa Malouf; Rebecca Martin; Ben Elwood
- Presented by: Nick Vindin
- Country of origin: Australia
- Original language: English
- No. of series: 5
- No. of episodes: 325

Production
- Executive producers: Monica O'Brien; Matthew Boughen
- Production locations: Sydney, New South Wales
- Editor: Ed Coyle
- Running time: 24 minutes
- Production company: Ambience Entertainment

Original release
- Network: 9Go!
- Release: 17 February 2014 – 2018

Move It is an Australian children's game show series that aired on 9Go! on weekdays at 8:00 am. Episodes were repeated on Saturdays at 12:00 pm.

The series began airing on 17 February 2014, presented by Nick Vindin and filmed in a studio in Sydney. In four rounds, two teams of two children compete to match words to categories given by the host. The team with the highest score play for prizes in the final game.

Move It was filmed at Fox Studios Australia.

== Format ==
The set consisted of two banks of five monitors, one bank for each team, and podiums for each team.

The first round is called "Move It and Match It", and sees one player from each team at a time matching words on the monitors as the answers to clues given by the host, all related to a given category. Players are given 45 seconds to move up and down the screens pressing the button under each one to select an answer and to choose its position. Teams earn 5 points per correct answer, plus if all answers are correct, bonus points are awarded at a rate of 1 point per second left on the clock at the end.

The second round is a buzzer round where the teams are given questions related to a certain category. In addition to earning 5 points, each correct answer reveals an image of that answer on the monitors. Once all the questions have been asked, the two players who didn't play the first round move up to the monitors to lock in the images according to clues given on a central monitor. Each correct match earns a further 5 points.

The third round is also a buzzer round, but this time questions and clues are worth 10 points. At the monitors, teams are given the clues one a time by the host and can't start moving until the end of the clue.

In the bonus round, the team with the most points must lock in groups of objects in a specified order, for example shortest to tallest or lightest to heaviest. If all objects are placed in the right order, then they win the prize.
