= Michael Balk =

Australian actor and producer

- Education: Queensland University of Technology
- Occupations: Actor, Producer, Television Presenter
- Years active: 2000–present

Michael Balk is an Australian actor, television presenter, radio announcer and producer.

== Personal life ==
Michael grew up in the Clarence Valley in Northern Rivers New South Wales. He attended primary and secondary school in Grafton before moving to Brisbane to study Arts/Law at Queensland University of Technology.

Balk is the nephew of acclaimed filmmaker Philip Hearnshaw, and grandson of Australian Liberal Politician Eric Hearnshaw.

== Career ==
Balk is best known for his original television roles, notably scrapboy in dirtgirlworld & Get Grubby TV, Glen Goosebump in SMASHHDOWN!, and various characters on BrainBuzz.

Michael appears in musicals, theatre productions and television commercials.

Between 2006 and 2010 Michael was lead presenter and producer at Steve Irwin's Australia Zoo.

Michael is the president of the Australian charity the Actors & Entertainers Benevolent Fund of Queensland. He served as president of Actors Equity Queensland for many years, and as a board director for the MEAA. Michael is currently the Federal President of the Media Entertainment Arts Alliance.

== Awards and nominations ==
Michael was nominated for Best Emerging Artist at the Matilda Awards in 2005 and 2006.

In 2010 dirtgirlworld was nominated for a Logie Award in the Outstanding Children's Program category. The creators of the show dedicated the nomination to key creatives on the team citing Michael Balk among them.

The stars of dirtgirlworld were recognized with an AFI Award in Melbourne, Australia in 2010.

dirtgirlworld also received nominations for a BAFTA and Prix Jeunesse Award in 2010, and for Outstanding Preschool Programme at the 2011 JAPAN prize in Tokyo.

In 2013, Balk and the team from the ABC went on to win the International Digital Emmy Award in Cannes for their work on dirtgirlworld.

Balk was voted in the Clarence Valley's Most Influential People of 2019.
