= Tony Gould (arts director) =

Australian arts director (1937–2020)

Tony Gould AM
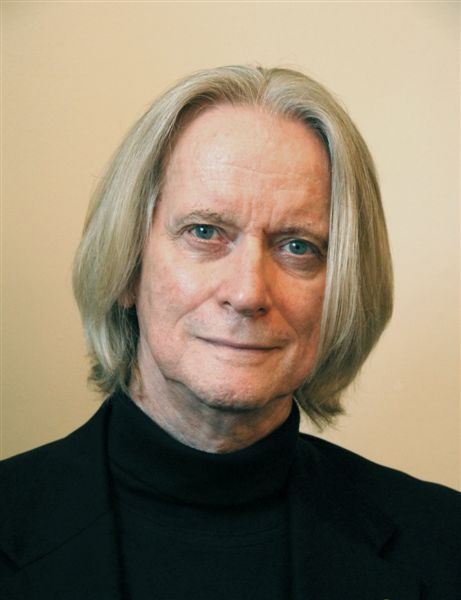
- Born: Anthony M. Gould; 1937; Sydney, Australia
- Died: 10 March 2020 (aged 82); Australia
- Occupations: Theatre art director, producer and manager
- Years active: 1961–2002 (retirement)
- Known for: Founding director of the Queensland Performing Arts Centre and the Brisbane Festival
- Awards: Centenary Medal; JC Williamson Award

Anthony M. Gould (1937 – 10 March 2020) was a theatre impresario, as an arts director, producer and manager, he was the founding director of the Queensland Performing Arts Centre (QPAC) and the Brisbane Festival.

== Career ==
Gould was born in Sydney and worked as a professional actor in the UK and later in Australia. He joined the Australian Elizabethan Theatre Trust and became an Arts Administrator in 1961. Over the next ten years he was a theatre producer and co-ordinated performing activities from overseas and Australia. He was appointed in 1972 by the Australian Broadcasting Corporation to the position of State Concert Manager for Queensland. He later moved to Sydney ABC, spending seven years presenting world class concert artists and symphony orchestras and presented around 750 concerts annually.

In 1979, after a worldwide search, Gould was named Director of Queensland's $130 million Performing Arts Centre (QPAC). Following the opening of the Centre in 1985, it received acclaim for its achievements in all disciplines of the performing arts. Under Gould's direction the Centre became known internationally for its contribution to the development of social-justice performing arts programs. During his time at QPAC, Tony Gould was chairman of the board of the Queensland Symphony Orchestra.

He served on the Council of the Queensland University of Technology, the Queensland Arts Council, the Queensland Cultural Centre Trust and the Music Council of Australia. He was a member of the Board of the Queensland Performing Arts Trust and served on the Australia International Cultural Council (AICC) – a body established to promote Australia's Arts image overseas.

In 1998, Tony Gould was awarded, by the Queensland University of Technology (QUT), the degree of Doctor of the University. The following year was the twentieth anniversary of his appointment as Director of the Queensland Performing Arts Trust and Gould received a special award from Brisbane Tourism for an Outstanding Contribution by an Individual for his leadership with arts-tourism initiatives.

In addition to his responsibilities as CEO and Artistic Director of QPAC, Gould established and was Artistic Director of the multimillion-dollar 1996, 1998, 2000, 2002 and 2004 Brisbane Festivals. These major international events received critical and public acclaim. It was Gould's policy that his festivals should include a high proportion of Australian performers and Australian performing companies.

In 2001, Griffith University admitted him to the degree of Doctor of the University. In 2002, he was appointed to the position of adjunct professor at QUT in the faculty of Creative Industries.

In 2002, after 23 years at QPAC, Gould retired from his position as founding Director. During that period, attendances totalled more than eight million and there were in excess of twelve thousand performances. Gould worked with all major stage and concert producers and his focus has invariably been on the appointment of Australian performers and creative artists

== Awards ==
In 2005, Gould was honoured by the Government of Queensland as a Queensland Great for his "Invaluable Personal Contribution to Queensland".

Gould has been appointed an Australia Day Ambassador (Queensland) on seven occasions (2005 to 2013). He has also been awarded the Australian Centenary Medal.

On his retirement, to acknowledge Gould's contribution to the live-performance industry, the exhibition space at the Arts Centre was named the Tony Gould Gallery.

== Personal life ==
Gould was married to former actress Jeannette Brown and they have two children. Their son Dr Anthony M. Gould is a professor at Laval University in Canada and a visiting professor at Cornell University in the US and their daughter Kate Gould, former chief executive of the Adelaide festival of arts, is the CEO/Founder of an online business consortium OurBodyCorp and OurPlaceManager and is also an Arts Consultant. Kate Gould is a director of the Adelaide Football Club (the Crows).

== Honours ==
In 1994, Gould was made a Member of the Order of Australia for service to the arts.

In 2008, Gould was presented with a Lifetime Achievement Award by The Actors' and Entertainers' Benevolent Fund of Queensland. He was Patron of the Fund from 2010 until his passing in 2020.

The Helpmann Awards is an awards show, celebrating live entertainment and performing arts in Australia, presented by industry group Live Performance Australia (LPA) since 2001. In 2010, Gould received the JC Williamson Award, the LPA's highest honour, for their life's work in live performance. This national award recognises an outstanding contribution to the Australian Live Performance Industry and is the highest honour that Live Performance Australia can bestow on an individual. He is also honoured in Live Performance Australia's Hall of Fame.
