= Maree Lowes =

Australian actress (born 1987)

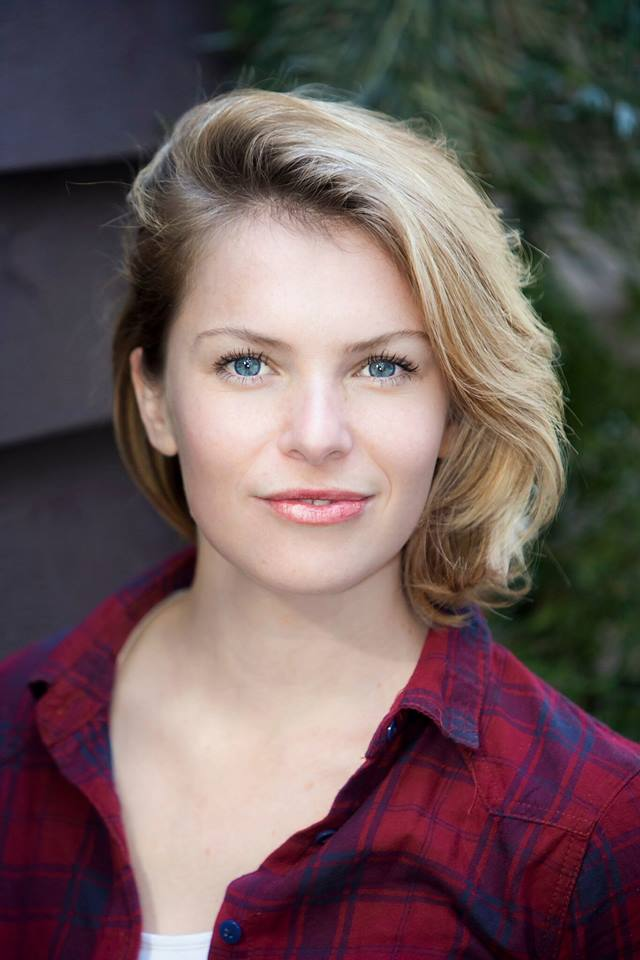
- Maree Lowes, 2015
- Born: 30 March 1987 (age 39); Grafton, New South Wales, Australia
- Education: University of Newcastle
- Occupation: Actress
- Years active: 2009-present

Maree Lowes is an Australian actress. She is best known for appearing as "dirtgirl" in the children's TV show dirtgirlworld and Get Grubby TV.

== Career ==
Maree Lowes is the star of the animated series dirtgirlworld, which has aired in 128 countries and is an Emmy Award-winning series. dirtgirlworld later evolved into the live action series and aired on ABC TV, get grubby TV.

In 2016, Lowes made her debut on stage at the Sydney Opera House as 'dirtgirl' in the musical 'Get Grubby - dirtgirl's eco musical'.

Other credits include the NRL educational series "He Said, She Said", short films such as Prairie (2020), The Last Stupid Thing, #goodtimes and Waiting For the Turning Of the Earth whose ensemble cast included Barry Otto, Rhys Muldoon and Anne Louise-Lambert.

Lowes has also worked as a content creator, 1st Assistant Director, Producer in music and TV and a Music Video stylist.
