= Dirtgirlworld =

Animated children's television series

- Genre: Animated series Educational
- Created by: Cate McQuillen; Hewey Eustace
- Developed by: Mememe Productions
- Voices of: Maree Lowes; Michael Balk; Krew Boylan; Gibson Nolte; Jason Davis
- Music by: Cate McQuillen; Hewey Eustace
- Countries of origin: Australia; Canada
- Original language: English
- No. of episodes: 52

Production
- Executive producers: Cate McQuillen; Hewey Eustace; Steven DeNure; Beth Stevenson; Jenny Lalor; Daniel Besen
- Production companies: Mememe Productions (Note: As Dirtgirlworld Productions Pty, Ltd.); Decode Entertainment (Note: As Decode/Dirtgirl Productions Inc.)

Original release
- Network: ABC Kids (Australia); CBC (Canada); CBeebies (UK)
- Release: 5 October 2009 – 2011

Dirtgirlworld, stylized as dirtgirlworld, is an animated children's television series, created by Cate McQuillen and Hewey Eustace of Mememe Productions. Visually designed by Jean Camden, James Hackett and Cate McQuillen, it was animated by Hackett Films in Australia and Spin Productions in Canada. The show was co-produced by Mememe Productions (Australia) and Decode Entertainment (Canada). The show has 52 eleven-minute episodes commissioned by CBeebies, the Canadian Broadcasting Corporation (CBC) and the Australian Broadcasting Corporation (ABC).

The show first aired on CBC on 5 October 2009, on CBeebies on 2 November 2009, and on ABC on 4 December 2009. It aired in the United States on Sprout, on 22 April 2010.

The series used 3D Computer animation combined with photomontage and live action.

== Synopsis ==
Dirtgirl, Scrapboy, Ken the weevil, Grubby the grub and Hayman the scarecrow all live together on a farm. In each episode, Dirtgirl has adventures outside, gets grubby and learns about nature while interacting with the other characters.

== Main characters ==
All the characters' names are in lowercase

- Dirtgirl (voiced by Maree Lowes) is a gumboot-wearing red-haired farm girl with blue eyes who grows tomatoes and drives a big orange tractor.
- Scrapboy (voiced by Michael Balk) is a boy who is a whiz with junk and is dirtgirl's best friend. He also works on scraps and loves recycling.
- Ken (voiced by Gibson Nolte) is a daredevil weevil who loves cows and wants to be a superstar stunt-bug. In the theme song, Ken jumps out of the cannon during a stunt.
- Grubby (voiced by Krew Boylan) is an orange grub caterpillar who is best friends with ken and also likes to perform stunt with him. She loves to eat dirt and is a stunt ringmaster.
- Hayman (voiced by Jason Davis) is a scarecrow who guards the garden and scares the crows away. He mostly says "Hay".

== Episodes ==
No.	Title
1	"Morning"
Everyone feels like something different for breakfast. Hayman loves hay, Grubby prefers a big bowl of dirt, and Dirtgirl wants eggs and spinach. Scrapboy comes over for his favourite meal, bringing the pancake machine.
2	"Grubby"
Dirtgirl discovers a new place to grow carrots after the bathtub springs a leak. Grubby isn't having a good day, and growing carrots proves to be grubby business. It all leads to a case of mistaken identity.
3	"Antics"
Do ants have eyelids? Find out the ants-wer to this eye-opening question with Dirtgirl.
4	"Choice"
Scrapboy teaches Dirtgirl how to play a game called heads or tails, where you flip a coin and call heads or tails and whoever calls correctly wins. The pair decide to make all of their decisions for the day by playing heads or tails.
5	"Juice"
You can squeeze a lot into a morning. Especially if you're Dirtgirl. Scrapboy needs as many oranges as he can get his hands on and Dirtgirl is happy to oblige, her trees are full of oranges.
6	"Wild"
It's time to go wild in Dirtgirlworld. There are lots of fun ways to camp and, on a marshmallow bed, even Ken winds up a happy camper.
7	"Seeds"
Dirtgirl and Scrapboy are extending the vegetable garden. The winter veggies need more sunshine, so Scrapboy has his digger going at full speed finishing the new winter garden bed.
8	"Hayman"
Scrapboy and Dirtgirl attempt to refuel the tractor with corn juice while keeping the crows at bay. Meanwhile, Ken and Grubby try to impress with their solar popcorn.
9	"Dig"
Today is a perfect day for dreaming in the sun but Dirtgirl knows if you want the gardening done you've got to dig it! Dirtgirl loves digging.
10	"Creepy Crawly"
One night, once a year, beneath the golden glow of the harvest moon, the most wonderful thing happens in Dirtgirlworld... the creepy crawly concert.
11	"Bees"
To attract bees to her garden, Dirtgirl plans a sweet-pea tee pe, and Scrapboy is happy to bring her wooden stakes.
12	"Circles"
Cheese, corn, hay, woodchips, and mud, Dirtgirl looks at all the certain different pizza toppings.
13	"Jam"
Strawberry jam, a tricky chicken and a disappearing stunt bug, now there's a Dirtgirl recipe for fun if ever we've heard one!
14	"Home"
An old cardboard box is transformed into a bedroom fit for a superstar stunt weevil, and Dirtgirl finds out where the peas call home.
15	"Walkabout"
Nature detective Dirtgirl is on a kind of walkabout, a nature walkabout.
16	"Balance"
Every day Dirtgirl tries hard to balance her life for the good of the planet. How she chooses to live and the things she does helps make the planet we live in. Dirtgirl knows all about balance.
17	"Swap"
In this episode, find out what happens when everyone in Dirtgirlworld swaps jobs.
18	"Windy"
Windy weather is great kite flying weather. But kite flying will have to wait today. It's tomato rescue time, Ken meets a chicken mid-air, some ants can can-can, and Scrapboy builds the best box kite any of them have ever seen.
19	"Slugs"
Everyone has a weakness and slugs are Dirtgirl's. She doesn't like them at all.
20	"Found"
Something soft, something that smells nice and something that sings now that sounds like a scavenger hunt all over Dirtgirlworld.
21	"Leak"
Everyone in Dirtgirlworld knows just how important saving water is, so when the water tank springs a leak, it's all hands on deck.
22	"Harmony"
Both Ken and Dirtgirl plan to spend the whole day together doing fun things.
23	"Giants"
Giant pumpkins have invaded Dirtgirlworld. Who will win the giant pumpkin competition in Dirtgirlworld?
24	"Beach"
A rainy day isn't a great day for a beach party, unless it's an inside beach party!
25	"Pond Pals"
When frogs start appearing everywhere but the frog pond, it's time for Dirtgirl to take a nature walkabout. She finds that the frog pond is not in very good shape.
26	"Fungus"
Dirtgirl knows a lot about mushrooms, but she didn't know they could fly.
27	"Apples"
It's apple-picking season in Dirtgirlworld. Dirtgirl and Scrapboy try to think of 101 different ways to use an apple, including celebrating Grubby's birthday.
28	"Wheels"
An old bicycle wheel creates big power for Scrapboy.
29	"Tools"
In this episode Dirtgirl and Scrapboy learn all about using the right tool for the right job and why the chickens are dancing.
30	"Time Capsule"
After buying a time capsule last summer, Dirtgirl and Scrapboy decide now is the time to dig it up, and Ken is sent into the future.
31	"Rainbows"
Dirtgirl sees a beautiful rainbow, which sends Grubby searching for a pot of gold.
32	"Scrapbox Racer"
Scrapboy challenges Dirtgirl to a race.
33	"Pollination"
Dirtgirl learns all about bees and Ken gets his own miniature garden.
34	"Windfall"
It's a windy day in Dirtgirlworld, and Ken tries hi-hand at feather surfing.
35	"Worms"
After seeing what a great job worms do composting, Dirtgirl decides to make her own worm farm.
36	"Treasure"
Everyone is encouraged by Dirtgirl to do some spring cleaning, but Ken is upset when Grubby throws away his birthday cards.
37	"Dinosaur"
Dinosaur bones are discovered by Scrapboy in Dirtgirl's garden, whilst Ken performs The Amazing Potato Stunt.
38	"Dream"
Dirtgirl has a dream where Ken is super brave and famous, Grubby has a passion for yoga, Hayman can talk, and Scrapboy repeats everything.
39	"Snug"
Scrapboy is hosting a sleepover in his tree house and Ken is worried he may not be able to go to sleep so far away from home.
40	"Egg"
Scrapboy builds an automatic egg-o-hover to deliver eggs straight to his and Dirtgirl's houses, but realises that he likes coming over to get eggs. Besides, the chickens would rather lay their eggs in a nest anyway.
41	"Solstice"
It's the summer solstice and everyone is preparing celebratory dance for the Summer Dance Party Night, including Hayman.
42	"Habitat"
A bandicoot is causing trouble in the garden, so Dirtgirl and Scrapboy set out to build it a new habitat.
43	"Germinate"
Dirtgirl tries to teach Ken about all the things needed to make a seed grow. Ken misinterprets the information and tries to grow Grubby a hair-bow tree.
44	"Wing Ding"
Roger the rooster has left for the weekend, so, of course, the chickens are throwing a huge party they call the wing ding.
45	"Butterflies"
There is another creepy-crawly conga tonight and Dirtgirl is going to make sure the chickens don't ruin it this time.
46	"Hatching"
A new baby chick has hatched in Dirtgirlworld and Velma and her egg have mysteriously gone missing.
47	"Trees"
Everyone is celebrating Arbor Day in Dirtgirlworld and Grubby invites the ringmaster of Cinque de soil to watch a stunt.
48	"Arhhh!"
Dirtgirl and Scrapboy discover a pirate chest and key and decide to play pirates for the rest of the day, leading Ken and Grubby to confuse them with real pirates.
49	"Rain"
Dirtgirl tries to figure out all of the signs in nature that signal it's about to rain in Dirtgirlworld.
50	"Water"
It's a sunny day in Dirtgirlworld and the water tank is nearly empty. Dirtgirl is on a mission to save every little drop of water she can.
51	"Tall"
Dirtgirl takes everyone to a playhouse she has made entirely out of sunflowers. Once there, everyone gets a chance to tell a tall tale.
52	"Earthday"
It's earth day in Dirtgirlworld and it's time for the earth day parade... a parade where all living things in Dirtgirlworld come together to celebrate the little things they do every day to help the earth survive.

== Awards ==
- 2013 Emmy Awards – Digital content for Children and Young People
- 2010 Australian Film Institute Awards – Best Children's Animated Series
- 2010 Australian Directors' Guild – GRASS award (Green awareness encouragement award)
- 2010 Australian Directors Guild – Best Direction in an Animation Program
- 2011 Byron Bay Film Festival – Best Animation
- 2010 British Academy Children's Awards – Nominated for International
- 2010 Prix Jeunesse – 0–5 years Finalist
- 2010 Logie Awards – Nominated for Most Outstanding Children's Program
- 2011 Seoul INPUT Festival – Participant
- 2012 Japan Prize – Finalist
- 2011 International Songwriting Competition – Best Kid's Song
- 2013 Screen Producers Australia – Interactive Production of the Year

=== ARIA Music Awards ===
Year	Nominated works	Award	Result
2011	Dig It	Best Children's Album	Nominated
2012	Dirtgirl Rocks The Planet	Best Children's Album	Nominated
