= JC Williamson Award =

Australian entertainment award

- Awarded for: In recognition of "individuals who have made an outstanding contribution to the Australian live entertainment and performing arts industry and shaped the future of our industry for the better."
- Country: Australia
- Presented by: Live Performance Australia (LPA)
- First award: 1998; 28 years ago
- Website: Website

The JC Williamson Award (formally known as the James Cassius Williamson Award) is a lifetime achievement award presented annually as a sector of the Helpmann Awards, governed by Live Performance Australia.

The awards are named after the American actor, who became Australia's foremost pioneering leading theatre entrepreneur James Cassius Williamson

The board of directors of the JC Williamson Awards committee elects recipients who are members of the performing arts, art administrators, entrepreneurs, members of the media, playwrights, theatre producers, directors and politicians

In 2020 and 2021, the awards where cancelled due to COVID-19, but it was announced in May 2021, that recipients will be awarded for the 2020 season.

== Recognition incitement ==
The awards are a lifetime achievement award in recognition with the incitement of "individuals who have made an outstanding contribution to the Australian live entertainment and performing arts industry and shaped the future of our industry for the better", the award is the highest honour the LPA can bestow.

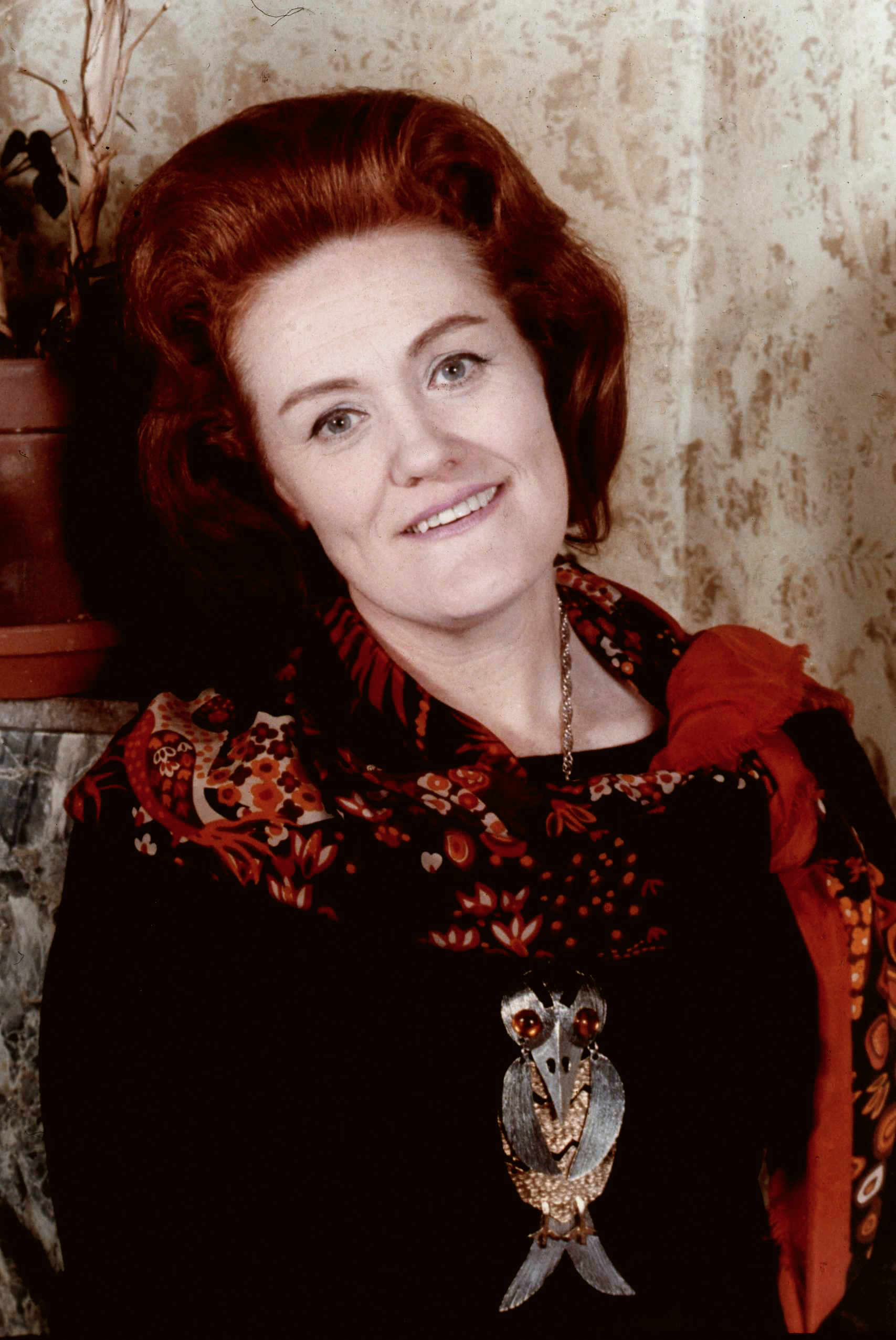
Operatic soprano, Dame Joan Sutherland, received the award in 2005.

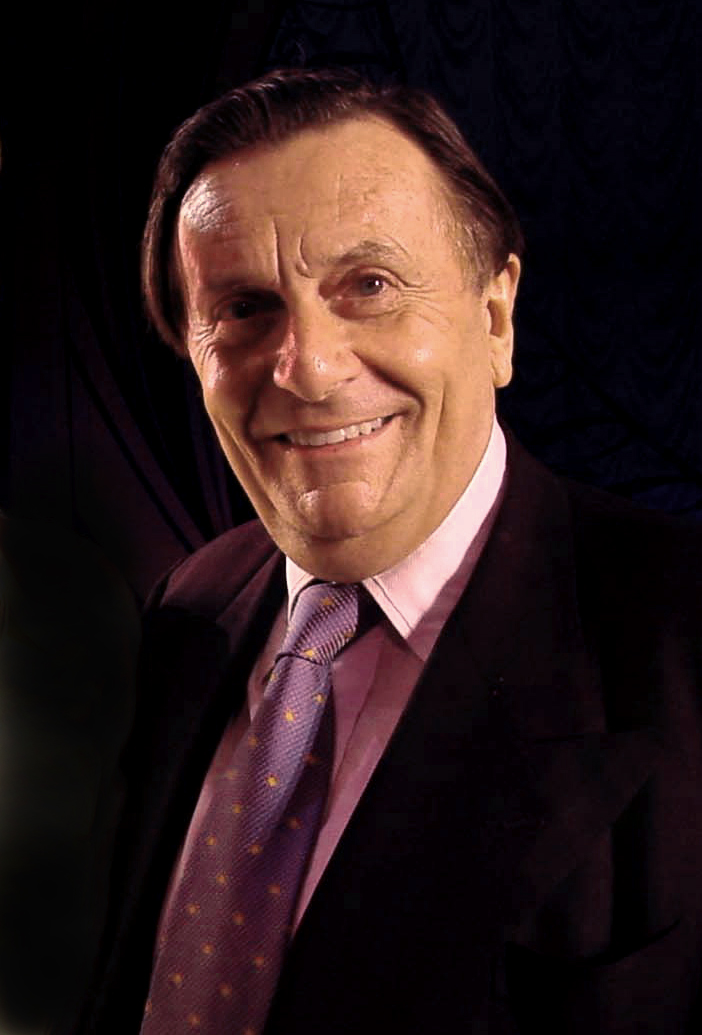
Comedian, Barry Humphries, was the 2008 recipient.

== Recipients ==
Year	Recipient(s)	Occupation	Ref(s)
1998	Edna Edgley; Kenn Brodziak	Edna Edgley - Theatre entrepreneur Kenn Brodzik - Concert promotor, producer, artist manager	
1999	Googie Withers; John McCallum	Googie Withers - Stage and screen actress, dancer John McCallum- theatre, film and TV actor and television producer	
2000	Award not given		
2001	Ruth Cracknell	Actress, comedienne and author	
2001	Clifford Hocking	Impresario and festival director	
2002	Kevin Jacobsen	Concert promotor, former musician	
2002	Graeme Murphy	Dancer/Choreographer	
2003	Wendy Blacklock; John Robertson	Wendy Blacklock Actress, theatre entrepreneur John Robertson - Producer	
2004	John Farnham	Singer	
2004	John Sumner	Founder and director of the Melbourne Theatre Company	
2005	Dame Joan Sutherland; David Williamson	(Dame) Joan Sutherland Coloratura Soprano; David Williamson - Playwright, dramatist	
2006	John Clark	Director	
2006	Graeme Bell	Musician	
2007	Dame Margaret Scott	Dancer/Choreographer, teacher, administrator	
2007	Barry Tuckwell	Musician	
2008	Sue Nattrass	Performer	
2008	Barry Humphries	Actor and comedian	
2009	John Bell	Actor, theatrical impresario	
2009	Michael Gudinski	Entertainment promotor, founder of Mushroom Records	
2010	Tony Gould	Queensland performing artsdirector	
2010	Brian Nebenzahl		
2011	Jill Perryman; Toni Lamond; Nancye Hayes	Jill Perryman - Actress and singer; Toni Lamond - Vaudevillian, cabaret performer, comedienne, actress, singer, dancer, writer, presenter; Nancye Hayes - Actress, singer, dancer/choreographer, director, narrator	
2012	Jimmy Little; Katharine Brisbane	Jimmy Little - Country singer/musician Katharine Brisbane - Journalist	
2013	Kylie Minogue; David Bleckinsop	Kylie Minogue - Singer and actress David Bleckinsop	
2014	John Frost	Producer	
2015	Paul Kelly	Musician, singer-songwriter	
2016	Stephen Page	Artistic director	
2017	Richard Tognetti	Musician	
2018	Robyn Archer; Reg Livermore; Robyn Nevin; Archie Roach; Jim Sharman	Robyn Archer -; Singer; writer; stage director; artistic director; arts patron Reg Livermore-; Actor; singer; theatrical performer; former television presenter Robyn Nevin; Actress; director; stage producer; theatre founder Archie Roach; Singer; songwriter; musician; Indigenous Australian rights activist Jim Sharman; Screen writer; director; producer; playwright	
2019	Kev Carmody	Singer-songwriter, Musician	
2020	Deborah Cheetham, David McAllister	Cheetham (Indigenous Australian soprano, actress, composer and playwright); McAllister (German Australian Politician)	
