= Smashhdown! =

- Genre: Game show
- Presented by: Andy Sunderland; Nick Allen-Ducat; Ashlee Lollback
- Country of origin: Australia
- Original language: English
- No. of series: 3
- No. of episodes: 550

Production
- Production locations: Brisbane, Queensland
- Running time: 30 minutes
- Production company: Nine Entertainment Co

Original release
- Network: 9Go!
- Release: 17 December 2018 – present

Smashhdown! is an Australian children's sports game show on 9Go!. The show features sports challenges and trivia to find "Australia's number one junior sports all-rounder".

== Production ==
Series 1 of the series began airing on 17 December 2018, presented by school teacher Andy Sunderland with commentators played by Michael Balk (Glen Goosebump) and Briana Goodchild (Glenda Goosebump). There are six tournaments in Series 1, featuring 25 shows per tournament. The show also features guest appearance from athletes such as netballer players Gretel Tippett (Diamonds) and Mahalia Cassidy (Firebirds), Australian Rules footballer Alex Witherden (Brisbane Lions), soccer player Daniel Leck (Brisbane Roar) and New Zealand international rugby league player Alex Glenn.

Series 2 began production in August 2019 and consists of four tournaments. Like the previous series, each tournament features 25 shows. The host for series 2 is Nick Allen-Ducat.

Series 3, titled Smashhdown!: Search for The G.O.A.T, is hosted by Ashlee Lollback, with Michael Balk continuing his role as a commentator. The series also features cast members Sami Afuni, Arnijke Larcombe-Weate and Danielle Remulta. The third series shifted the format of the series from a sports game show featuring child contestants due to COVID-19 restrictions. Horrible Histories inspired a new format featuring an ensemble of eight performers assuming historical and comedic characters. Head of Production and Programming for Nine Queensland, Geoff Cooper, stated in December 2022 that production of the third series (containing 250 episodes) had been completed. He estimated between 500 and 700 had been filmed overall; new episodes will air in 2023.

== Series overview ==
Series	Episodes	Originally released	
Series	Episodes	First released	Last released
1	150	17 December 2018	6 September 2019
2	150	16 March 2020	5 February 2021
3	250	29 November 2021	12 May 2023
