= BrainBuzz =

Australian children's television series

- Genre: Children
- Presented by: Kellyn Morris
- Starring: Clare Van Dorssen; Michael Balk
- Country of origin: Australia
- Original language: English
- No. of seasons: 2
- No. of episodes: 197

Production
- Production locations: Brisbane, Queensland
- Running time: 30 minutes (with ads)

Original release
- Network: 9Go!
- Release: 19 February 2018 – 14 February 2020

BrainBuzz is an Australian children's show on 9Go! from 19 February 2018, starring Kellyn Morris, scientist Clare Van Dorssen and "Einstein", played by Michael Balk. The series involves children who explore, dissect and solve many of the world's frequently asked questions and has been described as "science by stealth". The program is filmed at the QTQ Studio in Brisbane, Australia.

== Series overview ==
Series	Episodes		Originally released	
Series	Episodes		First released	Last released
1	132	65	19 February 2018	18 May 2018
1	132	65	20 August 2018	16 November 2018
1	132	2	31 August 2019	7 September 2019
2	65	55	7 October 2019	20 December 2019
2	65	10	3 February 2020	14 February 2020
