= William & Sparkles' Magical Tales =

- Genre: Children's television
- Country of origin: Australia
- Original language: English
- No. of seasons: 7
- No. of episodes: 315

Production
- Running time: 30 minutes
- Production company: Ambience Entertainment

Original release
- Network: Nine Network (2010–2012); 9Go! (2013–2017)
- Release: 5 March 2010 – 17 March 2017

William & Sparkles' Magical Tales is an Australian children's television series first screened on the Nine Network on 5 March 2010. The series of half-hour episodes is created by Ambience Entertainment for pre-school aged children.

William & Sparkles' Magical Tales follows the adventures of Sparkles the Fairy and William the Wizard, in the Enchanted Forest. Their friends include Nooshy & Pozo, Awesome Guy, Queen of the Fairies and many other guests.

== Cast ==
- Laura Murphy as Sparkles the Fairy
- James Buckingham as William the Wizard
- Chris Lane as Pozo
- Matthew McCoy as Nooshy
- Blake Young as Awesome Guy (Seasons 1, 3, 4, 5 and 6)
- Andrew Fritz as Awesome Guy (Season 2)
- Chelsea Plumley as Queen of the Fairies
- Jay James-Moody as the Magic Doctor of the Enchanted Forest
