= 9Go! =

Australian television channel

- Logo used since 2015
- Type: Children's programming • Teen programming
- Country: Australia
- Broadcast area: Sydney, Melbourne, Brisbane, Adelaide, Perth, Darwin, Northern NSW and Gold Coast, Regional Queensland, Southern NSW/ACT, Broken Hill NSW, Griffith NSW/MIA, Regional VIC, Mildura VIC, Tasmania, Spencer Gulf SA, Eastern SA, Regional WA, Remote Central & Eastern
- Network: Nine Network

Programming
- Language: English
- Picture format: 576i SDTV; 1080i HDTV (Note: HD simulcast available in metropolitan and non-Imparja/SCA regional areas)

Ownership
- Owner: Nine Entertainment
- Sister channels: Channel 9; 9HD; 9Gem; 9Life; 9Rush; Extra; 9GemHD

History
- Launched: 9 August 2009; 17 years ago
- Replaced: Nine Guide (2001–2008)
- Former names: GO! (2009–2015)

Links
- Website: 9now.com.au

Availability

Terrestrial
- TCN Sydney (DVB-T): 1059 @ 8 (191.5 MHz)
- GTV Melbourne (DVB-T): 1074 @ 8 (191.5 MHz),
- QTQ Brisbane/Sunshine Coast (DVB-T): 1030 @ 8 (191.5 MHz)
- NWS Adelaide (DVB-T): 1106 @ 8 (191.5 MHz)
- STW Perth/Mandurah (DVB-T): 1026 @ 8 (191.5 MHz)
- Freeview Nine metro (virtual): 93/99
- Freeview WIN Regional QLD, Southern NSW/ACT, Northern NSW/Gold Coast, Regional VIC, Mildura VIC/Sunraysia, Tasmania, Mount Gambier/Riverland, Griffith NSW, Darwin NT, Regional WA (virtual): 82 (92 Darwin)
- Freeview Seven Eastern SA, Broken Hill NSW (virtual): 83
- Freeview Imparja remote (virtual): 99

Streaming media
- 9Now

9Go! is an Australian free-to-air digital television multichannel, which was launched by the Nine Network on 9 August 2009, replacing Nine Guide. It is a youthful channel that offers a mix of comedy, reality, general entertainment, movies, animation and drama aimed at people between the ages of 2 and 18.

== History ==
=== 2009: Origins and launch ===
The general concept for GO! was revealed on 23 March 2009, with the Nine Network announcing their intention to start a standard-definition variety-based multichannel, launched midway through 2009. The channel's name and branding was first revealed as GO!99 on 14 April 2009 by TV Tonight, a blog dedicated to Australian television.

The channel's final name was confirmed by the Nine Network via A Current Affair as GO! on 15 July 2009, as well as multi-coloured logo variations.

The channel went to air at 1:00 pm on 5 August 2009, broadcasting a promo loop. GO! officially began broadcasting scheduled programming from 9 August 2009 at 6:30 pm with a 1-minute promo featuring the song "Go!" by Sydney based sound house group Noise International featuring vocals by Sharon Muscat. It was then followed by an episode of Wipeout, the first programme to air on the new channel.

There have been reports that GO!'s technical launch had caused a significant number of digital TV receivers to no longer pick up Nine's digital channels. In response, Nine established a helpline for viewers experiencing problems or requiring assistance to tune in to the new channel.

On 24 November 2009, the channel launched via Foxtel Cable on channel 129.

After major demands for the channel's theme song (which was written specifically for the channel), it was released independently by Noise International on 4 December 2009, having promised a month earlier. A music video was also produced (notable for the usage of neon dancers), which was regularly shown as a filler on the channel.

=== 2010–2014: Newsbursts, launch in regional areas, first birthday and new presentation ===
GO! introduced Newsbursts, a news-break filler program in May 2010. Presented by young journalists in the Nine newsroom, these would usually feature a few breaking news stories and the weather. These were later dropped in 2011, replaced by repeats of Nine Newsbreak.

GO! celebrated its first birthday in 2010 by playing movies every night at 10pm during the month of August 2010. GO! also played a mini clip during the commercial breaks thanking everyone for watching GO!.

In September 2010, GO! aired a promo promoting new shows using the song All Eyes on Me by Sammy Small, licensed from Extreme Music.

Darwin received the channel on 18 October 2010 (over a year after other capital cities started transmitting the multi channel). From December 2010, Nine Network affiliate Imparja Television commenced transmission of the GO! channel to viewers in remote areas of Central, Northern and Eastern Australia, before expanding to Eastern South Australia on 11 November 2011.

GO! received a new on-air presentation for 2011. GO! also played a mini clip after programs during Summer 2010/2011, featuring the song "Hello" by The Potbelleez. The slogan "Let's GO! 2011" was also used to promote new shows airing on the channel.

This presentation remained unchanged for the next few years, with Noise International's theme music reinstated. Rumours of a on-air presentation relaunch appeared after the channel's program lineups were redesigned in September 2013. Initially, the new lineups used "Let's Go" by Ashley Allen as background music, but was reverted to the regular theme music shortly after. "Let's Go" was also used in promos for the channel's 2014 program lineup and for children's movies.

=== 2014–2016: Rebrand and refocus ===
On 2 February 2014, the channel received a new logo and the on-air presentation graphics were updated by creative company DD8.

On 26 November 2015, the Nine Network introduced a network-wide rebrand of all of its digital channels with GO! being renamed 9Go!. Additionally, 9Go! was moved to channel 93, but a simulcast remained available on channel 99. Later, 9Go!'s on-air theme was changed for a continuous design across all of its channels. This included a new look for program listings, program advertisements and promos and introduced the in program classifications.

=== 2016–present: Regional media shakeup and beyond ===
Nine announced that it had signed a new affiliation deal with Southern Cross Austereo on 29 April 2016, replacing WIN Television as the primary Nine affiliate starting 1 July 2016. Consequently, 9Go! was broadcast by Southern Cross into Regional Queensland, Southern NSW/ACT and Regional Victoria on channel 53, also on TDT in Tasmania on channel 53.

On 12 December 2016, 9Go!'s daytime schedule was mostly reformatted into a children's programming block branded Go! Kids. Children's programming aired from 6am to 6pm on 9Go! in addition to being available via streaming on the 9Now service, with regular programming broadcast outside of those hours. In late 2019, the Go! Kids block was discontinued because of the cancellation of Kids' WB and their long-running output deal with Warner Bros.

In March 2021, Nine announced that WIN Television would be returning as the primary Nine regional affiliate from 1 July 2021. Consequently 9Go! got bumped up to channel 82.

9Go! in regional areas provided by WIN Television was converted into a MPEG-4 HD channel on 6 December 2023. 9Go! in Nine metropolitan areas was converted into a MPEG-4 HD channel on channel 99 on 8 May 2024. The HD feed launched in Darwin and northern NSW at the same time as metropolitan areas and a SD simulcast is still available on channel 93.

== Programming ==
Original plans for 9Go! suggested it would consist of a mix of entertainment and lifestyle programming (this rule wasn't featured until the launch of future Female-oriented HD channel 9Gem in 2010). However, this branding was replaced by a youth-orientated light-entertainment channel instead. 9Go!'s programming is generally structured under nightly themed blocks, which consists of comedy on Sunday, all new reality shows on Tuesday, sci-fi on Wednesday, female-skewed drama on Thursday (until the launch of 9Gem, when it was replaced by movies instead), and movies on Friday. Movies screen with "limited and brief commercial breaks". The schedule is designed not to cannibalise viewers from the main Nine channel.

It was announced in June 2009 that the Nine Network had signed a $500 million deal with Warner Bros. to continue its current output deal for another five years from 2011 to 2015. The deal helped Nine retain existing content (including many television series and films), as well as providing new content for both its primary channel, 9Gem (launched in 2010) and 9Go!.

The network also has ongoing content new and classic film and television brands from Warner Bros. Pictures, New Line Cinema, DC Studios, Warner Bros. Pictures Animation, Castle Rock Entertainment, Village Roadshow Pictures and Metro-Goldwyn-Mayer.

=== Current programming ===
==== Children's ====
- The Actually Really Very Difficult Show (2023–present)
- Barbie's Dreamhouse
- Beyblade X
- Earth Science Investigators (2023–present)
- Lego Dreamzzz
- Lego Friends
- Pokémon (2016–present)
  - Pokémon Horizons: The Series
  - Pokémon Horizons – The Search for Laqua
  - Pokémon Journeys: The Series
  - Pokémon Master Journeys: The Series
  - Pokémon Ultimate Journeys: The Series
- TheatreDome (2025–present)

==== Preschool ====
- Dino Ranch (2022–present)
- Earth to Luna! (2020–present)
- Gigantosaurus (2021–present)
- Gus, the Itsy Bitsy Knight
- Hop

==== Comedy ====
- The Nanny
- Seinfeld
- Young Sheldon
- The Big Bang Theory

==== Documentary ====
- Driving Test
- Southern Justice

==== Drama ====
- Arrow
- Gossip Girl
- Gotham
- The Originals
- Pretty Little Liars

==== Lifestyle ====
- Surfing Australia TV

==== Light entertainment ====
- BattleBots

==== Reality ====
- Auction Hunters
- Best Ink
- Can't Pay? We'll Take It Away!
- Cold Water Cowboys
- Container Wars
- Survivor

=== Former programming ===
==== Adult animation ====
- Aqua Teen Hunger Force
- The Brak Show
- China, IL
- Duncanville
- Father of the Pride
- Harvey Birdman, Attorney at Law
- Mike Tyson Mysteries
- Moral Orel
- Rick and Morty (Seasons 1 and 2 only)
- Robot Chicken
- South Park
- Squidbillies
- Supernatural: The Animation
- The Venture Bros.
- Watchmen: Motion Comic

==== Children's ====
- Adventure Time (2011–21)
- Alien TV (2019–24)
- The Amazing World of Gumball (2014–23)
- Animaniacs
- Bakugan: Armored Alliance
- Bakugan: Battle Planet
- Bakugan: Evolutions
- Bakugan: Geogan Rising
- Bakugan: Legends
- Barbie Dreamhouse Adventures
- Barbie Dreamtopia
- Batman: The Brave and the Bold
- Be Cool, Scooby-Doo!
- Ben 10 (2005 series)
- Ben 10 (2016 series)
- Ben 10: Alien Force
- Ben 10: Omniverse
- Ben 10: Ultimate Alien
- Berry Bees (2019–23)
- Beware the Batman
- Beyblade Burst
  - Beyblade Burst Evolution
  - Beyblade Burst Rise
  - Beyblade Burst Turbo
  - Beyblade Burst QuadDrive
  - Beyblade Burst QuadStrike
  - Beyblade Burst Surge
- BrainBuzz (2018–21)
- Buzz Bumble (2014–17)
- Camp Lazlo
- Captain Flinn and the Pirate Dinosaurs (2015–19)
- Care Bears: Unlock the Magic
- Clarence
- Class of 3000
- Classic Looney Tunes
- Creature Mania (2018)
- Crunch Time (2016–18)
- The Day My Butt Went Psycho! (2013–19)
- Dennis and Gnasher (2009 series) (2013–17)
- Digimon Fusion
- Dogstar (2013–15)
- Dumbotz (2019–23)
- Ed, Edd n Eddy
- Fanshaw & Crudnut (2017–20)
- Firehouse Tales
- Flash and Dash
- Flea Bitten (2013–14)
- The Flintstones
- Foster's Home for Imaginary Friends
- The Gamers 2037 (2020–23)
- Generator Rex
- Green Lantern: The Animated Series
- Heidi (2015–19)
- Hi Hi Puffy AmiYumi
- The Jetsons
- Josie and the Pussycats
- Jungle Beat
- Justice League Action
- Justice League Unlimited
- Kaijudo: Rise of the Duel Masters
- Kids' WB (2009–19)
- Kitchen Whiz (2013–16)
- Legion of Super Heroes
- Lego City (2019)
- Lego City Adventures
- Lego Marvel Super Heroes (2019–20)
- Lego Nexo Knights (2016–21)
- Lego Ninjago: Masters of Spinjitzu (2016–23)
- Lego Star Wars: Droid Tales
- Lego Jurassic World: Legend of Isla Nublar (2019–25)
- Lego Monkie Kid
- Little Charmers
- Littlest Pet Shop
- Littlest Pet Shop: A World of Our Own
- Loonatics Unleashed
- The Looney Tunes Show
- Mad
- Marine Boy
- Marvel's Avengers Assemble (2019)
- Max Steel
- Mega Man: Fully Charged
- Monsuno
- Most Extreme Alien Planet Earth (2017)
- Move It (2014–18)
- My Gym Partner's a Monkey
- My Little Pony: Friendship Is Magic
- Nate Is Late (2018–21)
- New Looney Tunes
- Over the Garden Wall
- Pinky and the Brain
- Pirate Express (2015–21)
- Polly Pocket
- Power Players
- Power Rangers
  - Power Rangers Beast Morphers
  - Power Rangers Dino Charge
  - Power Rangers Dino Fury
  - Power Rangers Megaforce
  - Power Rangers Ninja Steel
  - Power Rangers Samurai
- The Powerpuff Girls (2016 series)
- Pyramid (2009–15)
- Rabbids Invasion
- Regal Academy
- Regular Show
- Rev & Roll
- Ricky Zoom (2020–22)
- Robocar Poli
- Robotomy
- Scooby-Doo! Mystery Incorporated
- Scooby-Doo, Where Are You!
- Secret Mountain Fort Awesome
- Shaggy & Scooby-Doo Get a Clue!
- The Skinner Boys (2014–21)
- Smashhdown! (2018–24)
- The Smurfs (1981)
- Sonic Boom (2015–18)
- Space Chickens in Space (2018–23)
- Space Nova (2021–24)
- SpongeBob SquarePants (2015–17)
- Squirrel Boy
- Star Wars Rebels (2019)
- Steven Universe
- Sym-Bionic Titan
- Tamagotchi! (2010–14)
- Tangled: The Series (2019)
- Teen Titans
- Teen Titans Go!
- Tenkai Knights
- Thunderbirds
- Thunderbirds Are Go
- The Tom and Jerry Show (2014) (2014–25)
- Tom and Jerry Tales
- Transformers: Cyberverse
- Transformers: Prime
- Turning Mecard
- Uncle Grandpa
- Wacky Races (1968)
- We Bare Bears
- Wild Kratts
- Winx Club
- WWE Slam City
- Xiaolin Showdown
- Yo-Kai Watch
- Young Justice
- Yu-Gi-Oh!
  - Yu-Gi-Oh! Arc-V
  - Yu-Gi-Oh! SEVENS
  - Yu-Gi-Oh! VRAINS
  - Yu-Gi-Oh! Zexal

==== Preschool ====
- Hi-5 (2012, 2017–18)
- Hiccup & Sneeze (2017–19)
- I Am Me (2020)
- Imagination Train (2015–17)
- Kate & Mim-Mim
- The Lion Guard (2019)
- Mickey and the Roadster Racers (2019)
- Paw Patrol (2014–20)
- Puppy Dog Pals (2019)
- Rainbow Rangers
- Sofia the First (2019)
- Spidey and His Amazing Friends
- Sunny Bunnies
- Super Wings
- Surprises! (2012–15, 2018–20)
- Teddies (2017–20)
- Transformers: Rescue Bots
- Transformers: Rescue Bots Academy
- True and the Rainbow Kingdom
- Vampirina (2019)
- William & Sparkles' Magical Tales
- Yamba's Playtime

==== Comedy ====
- 2 Broke Girls
- 3rd Rock From the Sun
- Aliens in America
- Anger Management
- Bad Robots
- Big School
- Blackadder
- Community
- Curb Your Enthusiasm
- Everybody Loves Raymond
- Frasier
- Friends
- Full House
- Get Smart
- Green Acres
- Ground Floor
- Hellcats
- Just Shoot Me!
- Kevin Can Wait
- The King of Queens
- Little Britain
- Mad About You
- Malcolm in the Middle
- Married... with Children
- M*A*S*H
- The Middle
- Mike & Molly
- The Mindy Project
- Mom
- Mr. Mayor
- The New Adventures of Old Christine
- Parenthood
- The Partridge Family
- Privileged
- Reno 911!
- Spin City
- Step Dave
- Suburgatory
- Sullivan and Son
- Super Fun Night
- That '70s Show
- Two and a Half Men
- Weeds

==== Documentary ====
- The Crew

==== Drama ====
- The A-Team
- Airwolf
- Almost Human
- The Avengers
- Baywatch
- The Bionic Woman
- Bonanza
- Buck Rogers in the 25th Century
- The Carrie Diaries
- Charlie's Angels
- CSI: Crime Scene Investigation
- CSI: Miami
- CSI: NY
- Dante's Cove
- Dawson's Creek
- Drop Dead Diva
- The Dukes of Hazzard
- Eastwick
- ER
- The Following
- Friday Night Lights
- Fringe
- Hercules: The Legendary Journeys
- Heroes
- The Incredible Hulk
- iZombie
- Knight Rider
- The Last Ship
- MacGyver
- Miami Vice
- Moonlight
- New Amsterdam
- Nikita
- Nip/Tuck
- Primeval
- Quantum Leap
- Royal Pains
- SeaQuest DSV
- The Six Million Dollar Man
- Sliders
- Stalker
- Star Trek: The Original Series
- Starsky & Hutch
- Step Dave
- Terminator: The Sarah Connor Chronicles
- Unnatural History
- V
- The Vampire Diaries
- The Wire
- Xena: Warrior Princess

==== Lifestyle ====
- Fishing Australia

==== Light entertainment ====
- The ARIA Music Show
- Australia's Funniest Home Videos (includes Daily Edition)
- Balls of Steel Australia
- The Beer Factor (2012)
- The Cube
- The Darren Sanders Show
- Eclipse Music TV
- The Ellen DeGeneres Show
- Extra
- GO! Surround Sound
- ManSpace
- Oh Sit!
- Science of Stupid
- Top Gear
- Top Gear Australia
- Top Gear US
- Total Wipeout UK
- Wipeout USA

==== Factual ====
- Fugitive: Black Ops
- Police Ten 7
- RBT

==== Reality ====
- 16 and Pregnant
- Airplane Repo
- American Idol
- American Ninja Warrior
- Australian Ninja Warrior
- Bachelor Pad
- The Bachelor US
- The Bachelorette US
- Big Brother
- The Block
- The Block New Zealand
- Bridezillas
- Britain's Got Talent
- Car SOS
- Dance Moms
- Dance Your Ass Off
- Deepwater
- Dog and Beth: On the Hunt
- Dog the Bounty Hunter
- Ghost Town Gold
- The Great Australian Bake Off
- The Hills
- Hollywood Medium with Tyler Henry
- Keeping Up with the Kardashians
- Lip Sync Battle
- Meet the Hockers
- MTV Cribs
- MTV Cribs UK
- Neighbours at War
- The NRL Rookie
- South Beach Tow
- Speeders
- Storage Hunters
- Sun, Sex and Suspicious Parents
- Tattoo Fixers
- Teen Mom
- Tool Academy
- Total Divas
- Very Cavallari
- The Voice Australia
- The Voice US
- Wife Swap USA

==== WWE ====
- WWE Raw
- WWE SmackDown

=== Sport ===
NRL matches were shown on 9Go! on Friday nights if the cricket was scheduled on 9Gem in Victoria, Tasmania, South Australia and Western Australia. 9Go! also broadcast the 2015 Liverpool FC tour matches against Brisbane Roar and Adelaide United. The NBL was broadcast on 9Go! on Sundays if the cricket was scheduled on 9Gem. On 16 August 2017 it was announced that WWE programming including Monday Night Raw and SmackDown Live would air every week on the channel in a reduced one hour format. Raw airs on Thursdays at 11PM and SmackDown Live airs following the Friday night movie.

== Availability ==
9Go! is available in standard definition and high definition in metropolitan areas and regional areas through Nine Network owned-and-operated stations: TCN Sydney, GTV Melbourne, QTQ Brisbane, NWS Adelaide and STW Perth. It is also available through affiliated stations WIN Southern NSW/ACT, NTD Darwin, NBN Northern New South Wales, GTS/BKN Broken Hill NSW, AMN Griffith NSW, VTV Regional VIC, STV Mildura, RTQ Regional QLD, TVT Tasmania, GTS/BKN Spencer Gulf SA, SES/RTS Eastern SA, WOW Regional WA and Remote Central & Eastern.

== Logo and identity history ==
When GO! was in development stages, the concept name was revealed as GO!99 on 14 April 2009 with a black and white concept logo. On 15 July 2009, news program A Current Affair confirmed the name as GO! along with a scheme of multi-coloured logos based on the original concept logo. On 2 February 2014, the channel's branding was refreshed with a new, 3D glossy logo with multi-coloured gradient variants. Following the network-wide rebrand on 26 November 2015, the channel was renamed 9Go! with the famous "nine dots" from Nine's logo integrated into then-current logo, but with the O in lowercase. WIN Television has a variant of the 9Go! logo with the aforementioned channel's logo above 9Go!'s 2009–2014 logo.

Original concept logo

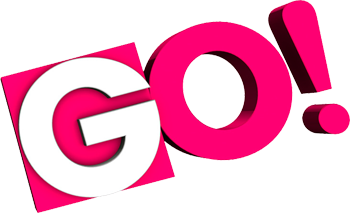
9 August 2009 – 1 February 2014

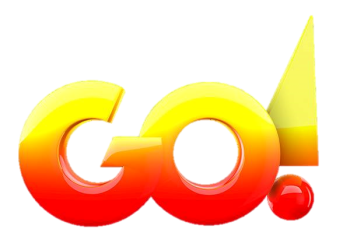
2 February 2014 – 25 November 2015

26 November 2015 – present

=== Identity history ===
- 9 August 2009 – 1 February 2014: Good to GO! (first era) (accompanied in promotional trailers by "Go!" by Noise International feat. Sharon Muscat)
- Christmas slogan (since December 2009): GO! HO! HO!
- 2010–2012: Let's GO! (accompanied in promotional trailers by "Hello" by The Potbelleez)
- 2 February 2014 – 25 November 2015: GO! For It!
- 26 November 2015 – present: Good to Go! (second era)
