= Economy of Brisbane =

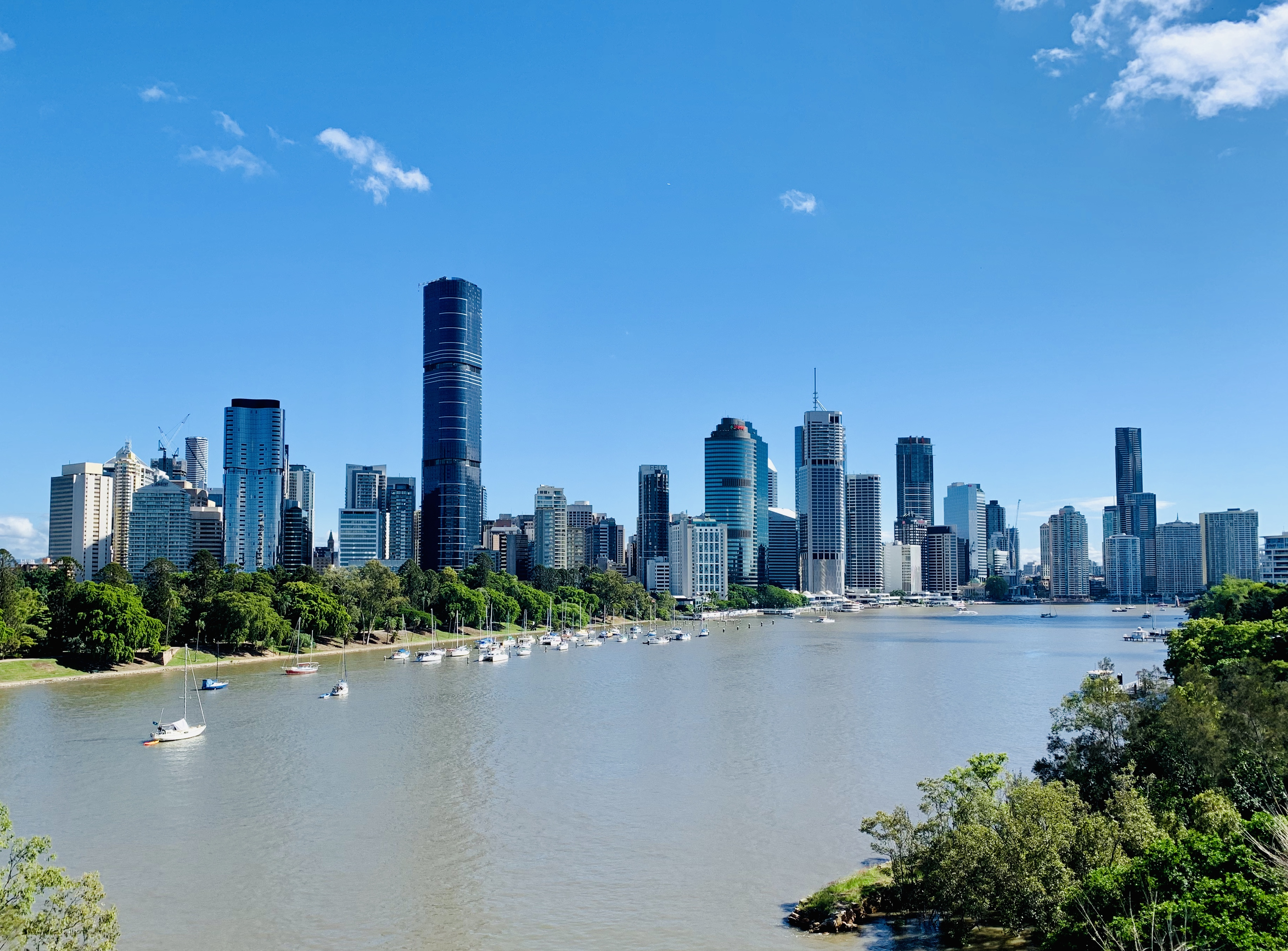
- Skylines of Brisbane CBD from Kangaroo Point, Queensland
- Currency: Australian Dollar (A$ or AUD)
- Fiscal year: 1 July – 30 June

Statistics
- GDP: 177 billion (2017–18)
- GDP growth: 3.3% (2017–18)
- GDP per capita: $67,300 (2015–16)
- Inflation (CPI): 1.5% (annual from March Qtr 2019)
- Unemployment: 5.5% (December 2018)
- Main industries: Health care, professional services, retail trade, tourism, education
- All values, unless otherwise stated, are in US dollars.

The economy of Brisbane consists mainly of several industries, including health care, professional services and retail trade. It holds a population of over 2.4 million people in broader urban centres and localities, with a mean age of 35 years. Brisbane's Gross Domestic Product was $170.5 billion in 2017–18, contributing to around half of Queensland's overall economy and 9.4% of national gross domestic product.

Major export categories for the economy include tourism ($7.1 billion, year to September 2018), education ($3.8 billion, 2014) and goods exports through the Brisbane Airport and Port of Brisbane ($16.1 billion, 2017–18). The cyclical downturn of the 2000s mining boom has led to investments being directed towards other industry sectors, with a projected $15 billion infrastructure boom during the early 2020s. Projects include the Cross River Rail project, with the Palaszczuk government expected to fund approximately half of the operation.

The Greater Brisbane region expands over 15,826 square kilometres, covering 8 local government areas and is notable for its 344-kilometre (214 mi) Brisbane River. It is the third largest city in Australia.

Categorised as a global city, Brisbane is among Asia-Pacific cities with largest GDPs and is one of the major business hubs in Australia, with strengths in mining, banking, insurance, transportation, information technology, real estate and food.

Some of the largest companies headquartered in Brisbane, all among Australia's largest, include Suncorp Group, Virgin Australia, Aurizon, Bank of Queensland, Flight Centre, Great Southern Bank, Australian Retirement Trust, Domino's Pizza Enterprises, Star Entertainment Group, ALS, TechnologyOne, NEXTDC, Super Retail Group, New Hope Coal, Jumbo Interactive, National Storage, Collins Foods and Boeing Australia. Most major Australian companies, as well as numerous international companies, have contact offices in Brisbane.

Tourism is an important part of the Brisbane economy, both in its own right and as a gateway to other areas of Queensland, as international education, with over 95,000 international students enrolled in universities and other tertiary education institutions in the central Brisbane City Council local government area alone in 2018.

== History ==
The penal era in Brisbane ended in 1842 and free settlers began to colonise the city, driving the population up to 6000 by 1859. Between the years 1860 and 1865, more than 35,000 free settlers moved to Brisbane after it was declared as Queensland's capital city.

During World War II, Brisbane experienced another population boom, becoming the headquarters for the South West Pacific campaign. The economy experienced significant growth as both US citizens and Australian citizens from other states migrated to the city to contribute to the war effort, almost doubling Brisbane's population and signifying Brisbane as a training area. Medical facilities, workshops and depots necessary for the war effort were erected, creating thousands of jobs and giving rise to significant economic growth.

The 2010–2011 Queensland floods severely affected Brisbane, with 78% of the state declared to be in a disaster zone. An estimated 18,000 properties were flooded in the Brisbane's metropolitan area, including the broader Brisbane River Valley and Ipswich.

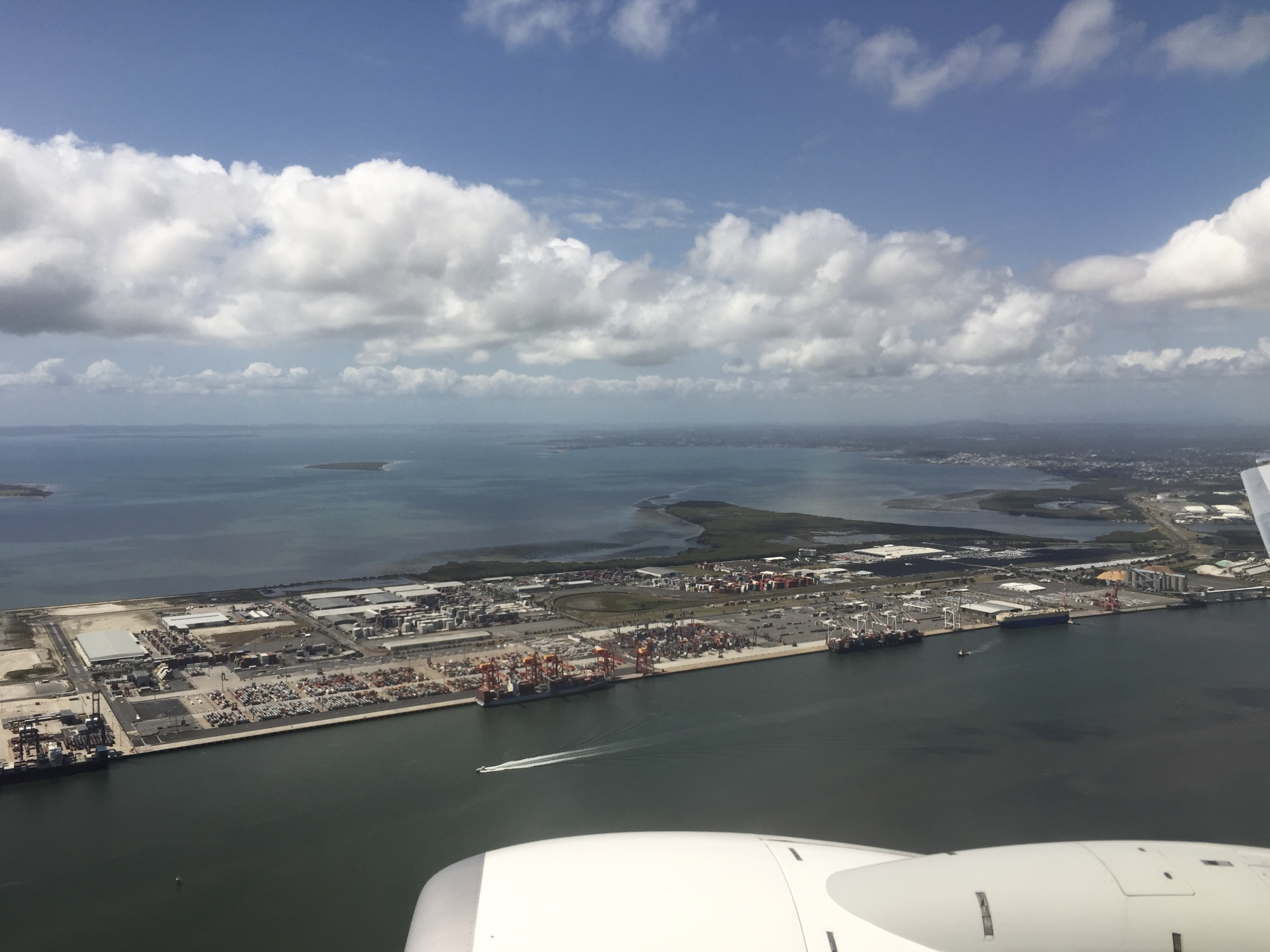
Port of Brisbane, Queensland

By 11 January 2011, twenty thousand homes had been affected, with The Brisbane River Walk (a bridge suspending over the river), collapsing into the surrounding water. This, along with other damages, resulted in $2.55 billion of insurance payouts, with the loss of infrastructure and businesses within the city severely damaging the economy. As a consequence, population growth slowed as people feared future floods, whilst economic growth slowed as the city began to rebuild.

=== The Port of Brisbane ===
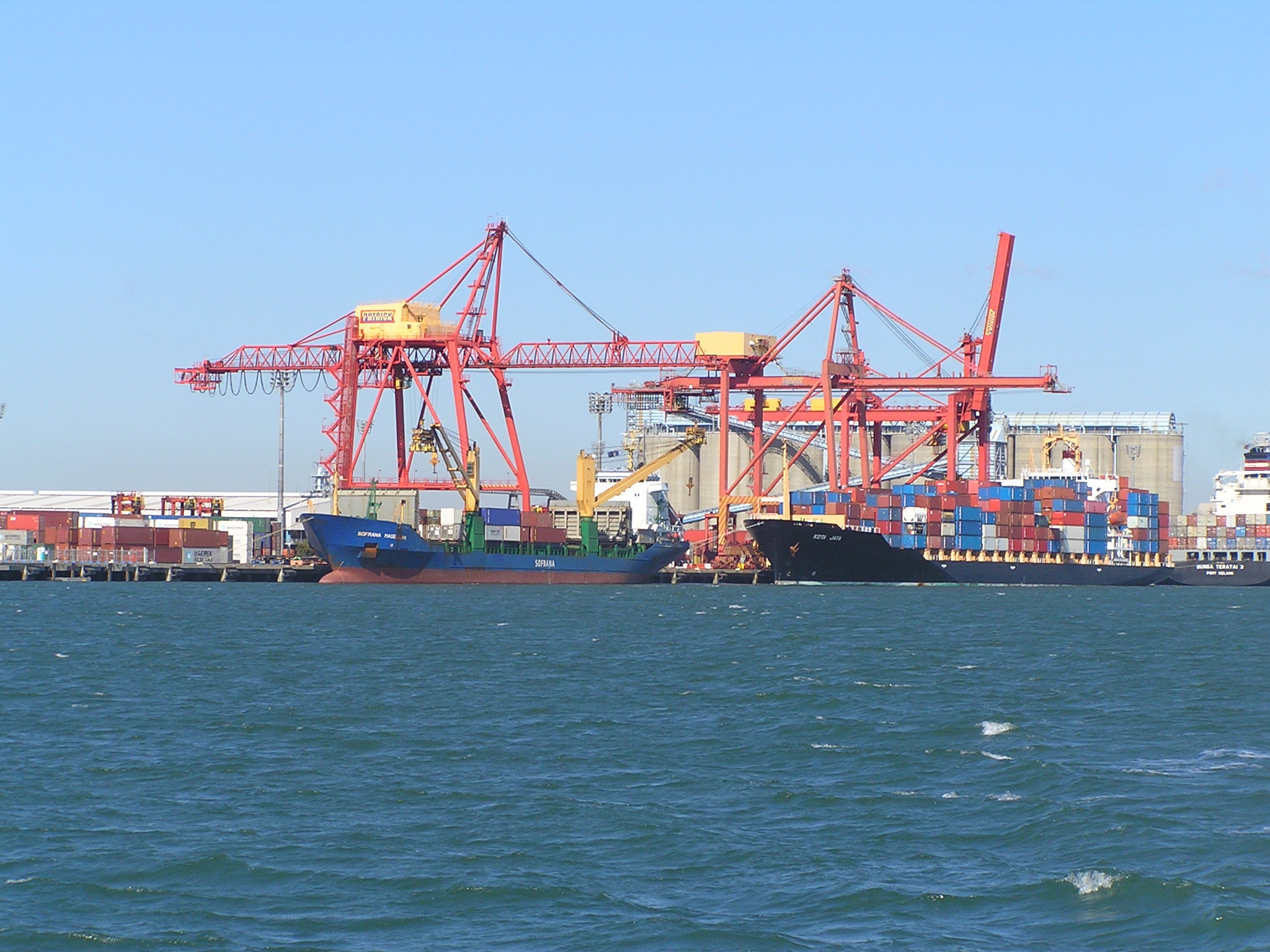
The Port of Brisbane

Brisbane throughout its history has been one of Australia's most important seaport cities. The Port of Brisbane located at the Brisbane River's mouth on Moreton Bay and on the adjacent Fisherman's Island, created by means of land reclamation. It is the 3rd busiest port in Australia for value of goods. Container freight, sugar, grain, coal and bulk liquids are the major exports. Most of the port facilities are less than three decades old and some are built on reclaimed mangroves and wetlands. The Port is a part of the Australia TradeCoast, which includes the Brisbane Airport along with large industrial estates located along both banks at the mouth of the Brisbane River.

The Port of Brisbane holds historical significance in regards to prosperous economic growth in both Brisbane and broader Queensland. The Port of Brisbane Pty Ltd outlines that, "The history of European settlement in Brisbane is directly tied to the development and evolution of its port," and that it has strengthened international ties, which is crucial if Brisbane is to become a global city.

In 2016–17, it facilitated the export and import of 33.2 million tonnes of commodities.

== Industries ==
The top five industries in Brisbane by employment as of November 2018 are:

1. Health care and social assistance (176,594 employed persons)
2. Professional, scientific and technical services (114,680 employed persons)
3. Retail trade (119,409 employed persons)
4. Education and training (100,450 employed persons)
5. Construction (113,310 employed persons)

Large population growth over South-East Queensland has led to the expansion of labour-intensive employment including construction, education, government, health and retail, which accounts for over half of Brisbane's total employment. Between 2011 and 2016, the number of employed persons in Greater Brisbane increased by 63,169, with the largest increase occurring in education and training (+16,983 persons) and health care and social assistance (+15,946 persons).

=== Resource sector ===
Employment in the mining industry throughout Australia tripled from a low of 75,400 in February 2001 to a peak of 275,200 in May 2012. At this peak, a total of 2.4% of the Australian workforce were employed in the mining industry, with the largest areas of related social, economic and demographic impact occurring in Western Australia and Queensland. Brisbane acts as a headquarter for many mining and resources businesses in broader Queensland, which is rich in natural resources. Queensland is the world's largest exporter of seaborne metallurgical coal and in 2013, 41% of the world's unconventional gas projects were under construction within the state. Many of the profits earned from these businesses trickle into the Brisbane economy.

Though the resource boom is slowly declining and starting to negatively affect Brisbane's economic growth, it continues to contribute to the economy's Gross Regional Product. In 2017, Brisbane's Gross Regional Product was valued at $162 billion, with a 16.6% contribution from the resource sector. In June 2017, Brisbane was estimated to home 198,863 businesses, of which 7277 are directly supported by the resources sector. The sector contributed $25.8 billion to the Greater Brisbane economy in 2016–2017.

=== Education ===
The state of Queensland mandates that children between the ages of 6 and 16 receive schooling, with the state offering twelve years of formal schooling and two years of preliminary schooling.

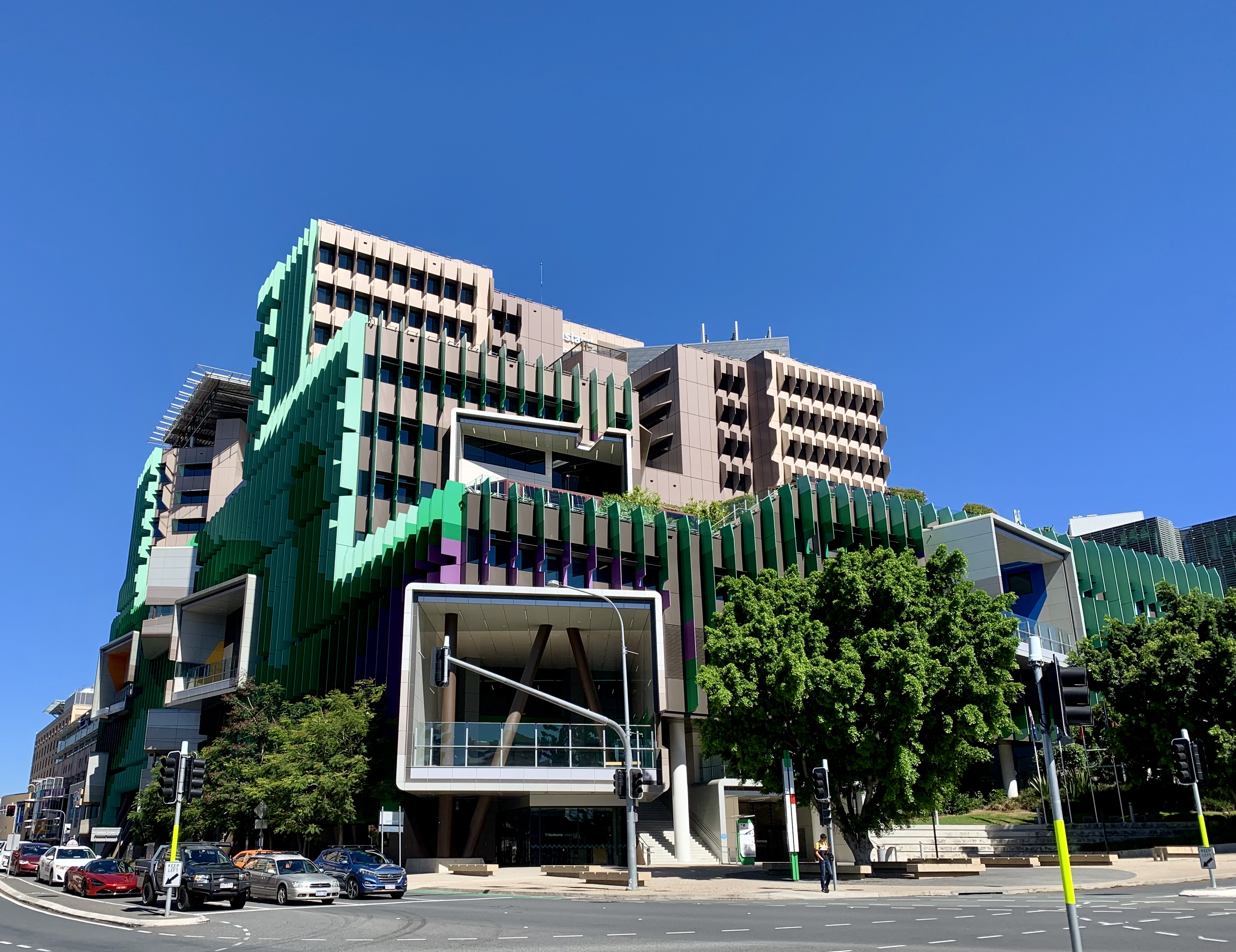
Queensland Children's Hospital, South Brisbane

As Brisbane is home to more than 443,000 people between the ages of 5 and 19 years, it makes sense that one of the city's largest industries is education, with 100,450 employed persons in 2018. Brisbane is also home to many tertiary institutions, including Griffith University, The Queensland University of Technology and The University of Queensland. These three universities alone have more than 148,000 enrolled students and attract thousands of international students every year. This is in line with national standards, as education is Australia's third-largest export, with the international education sector contributing $32.2 billion to the Australian economy in 2017.

=== Healthcare ===
In 2016, more people in Greater Brisbane worked in the health care and social service industries than any other line of work, totalling 141,121 employed persons. There are over 30 private hospitals and 20 public hospitals in Brisbane and its surrounding suburbs, including the Mater Hospital network, the Princess Alexandra Hospital and the Royal Brisbane & Women's Hospital, which is the largest hospital in the southern hemisphere. Healthcare in Brisbane falls under the state-run healthcare scheme Medicare, which is government-funded through income tax.

== Labour market ==
The population of Brisbane totals over 2.4 million citizens and ranks as the third largest city in Australia, accounting for 19% of the country's population. Unemployment in Greater Brisbane was at a rate of 6.1% in December 2018, which is in line with the state's unemployment rate, which ranks as the second-most unemployed state in the country as of March 2019. The 2016 census data shows that the median age in Brisbane is 35, with around 20% of the population being categorised as children aged 0–14. This is an indication of a relatively young population, pointing to the need for a strong education services sector.

The Lord Mayor's Economic Development Steering Committee has identified a need for growth in education employment, detailing that in the years 2012–2031, education will be amongst the fastest-growing industries for job growth. This is outlined in their Economic Development Plan 2012–2031, delineating that there is a strong need for a redirection of resources to improve education facilities and infrastructure across the city.

== Retail ==
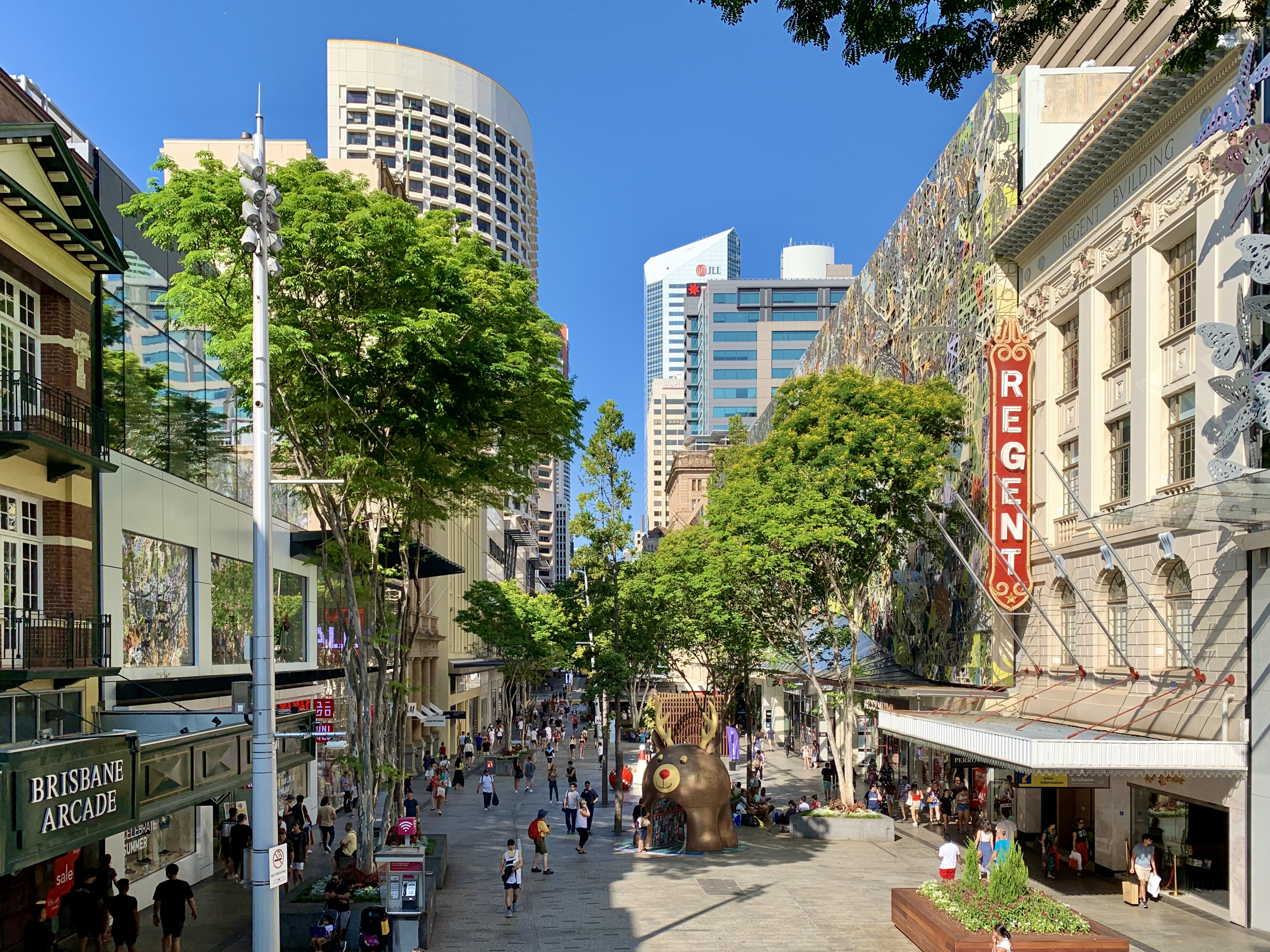
The Queen Street Mall, Queensland's largest pedestrian mall

Retail in the CBD is centred around the Queen Street Mall, which is Queensland's largest pedestrian mall. Shopping centres in the CBD include the Myer Centre, the Wintergarden, MacArthur Central and QueensPlaza, with the last of these along with Edward Street forming the city's focus for luxury brands. There are historical shopping arcades at Brisbane Arcade and Tattersalls Arcade. Suburbs adjacent to the CBD such as Fortitude Valley (particularly James Street), South Brisbane and West End are also a major inner-city retail hubs.

Outside of the inner-city, retail is focused on indoor shopping centres, including numerous regional shopping centres along with six super regional shopping centres, all of which are among Australia's largest, namely: Westfield Chermside in the north; Westfield Mt Gravatt in the south; Westfield Carindale in the east; Indooroopilly Shopping Centre in the west; Westfield North Lakes in the outer-north; and Logan Hyperdome in the outer-south. Brisbane's major factory outlet centres are the Direct Factory Outlet at Skygate and Jindalee.

The 100 hectare Brisbane Markets at Rocklea are Brisbane's largest wholesale markets, whilst smaller markets operate at numerous locations throughout the city including South Bank Parklands, Davies Park in West End and the Eat Street Markets at Hamilton.

== Brisbane Economic Development Plan 2012-2031 ==
The Brisbane Economic Development Plan 2012-2031 is a council publication that sets out Brisbane's priorities and actions that are required in order to achieve its economic goals by 2031. It has three main pillars by which it measures its success:

"With growth from today’s $114 billion economy to an expected $217 billion by 2031, Brisbane is on track to become one of the world’s most prosperous cities...Forecast economic growth is expected to outstrip population growth with Brisbane’s economic output projected to increase by 40%, from roughly $55,000 per person in 2011 to over $75,000 (in 2011 dollars) per person by 2031."

- 1.5 million employed citizens (in the Brisbane metropolitan area)
- Achieving a $217 billion economy
- $75,000 per capita income

The plan outlines Brisbane's need to strengthen the city's relationship with Asia, maximise job growth, improve its tourism potential and to develop its digital economy, as outlined by the Lord Mayor of Brisbane (at the time of publication), Graham Quirk. Four goals are outlined that are necessary to achieve the above successes:

1. Build Brisbane's global reputation
2. Become more productive
3. Attract talented and global connections
4. Become a 'lifestyle city'

The plan outlines that in order to achieve these goals, Brisbane's population must grow significantly. An estimated 443,000 workers will need to be accommodated in the city by 2031, with 343,000 of these additional workers required by 2021. The council has also forecasted that the population within metropolitan Brisbane alone will grow by 820,000 people, with an estimated two-thirds of additional jobs to be within the Local Brisbane Government area.

The council also wants to increase Brisbane's global reputation as a new 'World City' by attracting international businesspeople. in doing so, they hope to increase global awareness of Brisbane's attractiveness and to promote growth in tourism, attract international investment and draw in talented workers. Numerous international conventions have already been held in Brisbane for this purpose, which contribute more than $200 million to the economy annually. These include:

- 26th Commonwealth Agricultural Conference 2014
- Annual Meeting of the International Society for Paediatric and Adolescent Diabetes 2015
- World Water Congress 2016
