= Nick Vindin =

Australian broadcaster

Nick Vindin is an Australian television and radio presenter.

== Television career ==
Vindin is best known for his role as host of the popular cycling travelogue "The Scenic Cyclist" which has aired on SBS TV since 2015 and has seen him ride the roads of Italy, Spain, Peru, Bolivia and the United States.

In 2015, Vindin covered the Tour of Spain in Europe and that same year also anchored the network's coverage of the Tour of California from on location, again taking on a series of 10 rides around California in an online feature called California Cruising

Vindin has been a regular on SBS TV working as a sports reporter for their flagship news program SBS World News since 2009. In his capacity as a sports anchor Vindin has covered some of the major sporting events to a national audience live from the field. Formula One has always been a keen area of interest and Vindin has pulled off some big interviews for the network chatting with world champion Lewis Hamilton, Nico Rosberg, Daniel Ricciardo, Susie Wolff, Kevin Magnussen, Jolyon Palmer, Romain Grosjean, Pastor Maldonado and Sergio Pérez – all of which ran on prime time TV on SBS in Australia.

He has also filled in for SBS TV's veteran Cycling Host Mike Tomalaris to anchor the weekly World of Cycling program during the Tour de France and the Giro d'Italia.

Ever keen to demonstrate his willingness to take on a challenge, in 2014 Vindin cycled 1,000 kilometres on a bike from La Paz in Bolivia to Cusco in Peru. Documenting the Andean adventure and the altitude sickness alike in a web series called "Two on 2 do Peru" on the networks's Cycling Central platform.

Vindin has also read the main news and presented the sport for SBS TV's NITV News in the absence of their regular presenters.

Prior to working at SBS World News Vindin began his career in journalism working with Fox Sports News (Australia) and at Fox Reality Channel in the United States.

== Sydney to Hobart ==
Vindin has a colourful history with the infamous Sydney to Hobart yacht race. In 2010, Vindin was doing a live cross at the start of the race on board a media boat and was hit by one of the favourites Wild Thing.

In 2013, he made a mends competing in the race on board yacht Southern Excellence II – which went on to finish 12th over the line. Nick was also reporting for SBS from on board the entrant.

The following year he also secured a spot on board American supermaxi Rio 100 which, after more than sixty hours of racing, was narrowly beaten into third place by home favourite Ragamuffin. Vindin again broadcast for SBS while racing his way into fourth position over the line. In 2015, he again reunited with the Rio100 crew to sail in the SoCal300 yacht race, a regatta the crew went on to win and set a new line honours record.

Vindin maintains his Sydney to Hobart Yacht Race feel good point was in 2015 when he joined mariner Giovanni Soldini aboard Maserati to claim a second fourth-place finish on line honours in a race which saw a third of the fleet, including defending champion Wild Oats XI retire due to boat breaking conditions.

== Philanthropy ==
Vindin is the founding chairman of breast cancer fundraising initiative Concert for the Cure. He started the charity after losing his mother to breast cancer at the age of 15.

Concert for the Cure has held fundraisers with some of the biggest names in Australian music including Powderfinger and Jet and won an ASTRA Awards in 2008 for the Most Outstanding Music Program or Coverage – MAX Sessions: Powderfinger, Concert for the Cure (MAX).

== Awards ==
In 2014, Vindin was crowned a "Witchery Man" of style and substance, Australia's preeminent Hair & Style awards. That same year he was presented with the Woollahra Council Award for the Most Innovative Cultural/Arts Initiative.
