= Namila Benson =

Australian radio broadcaster and television presenter

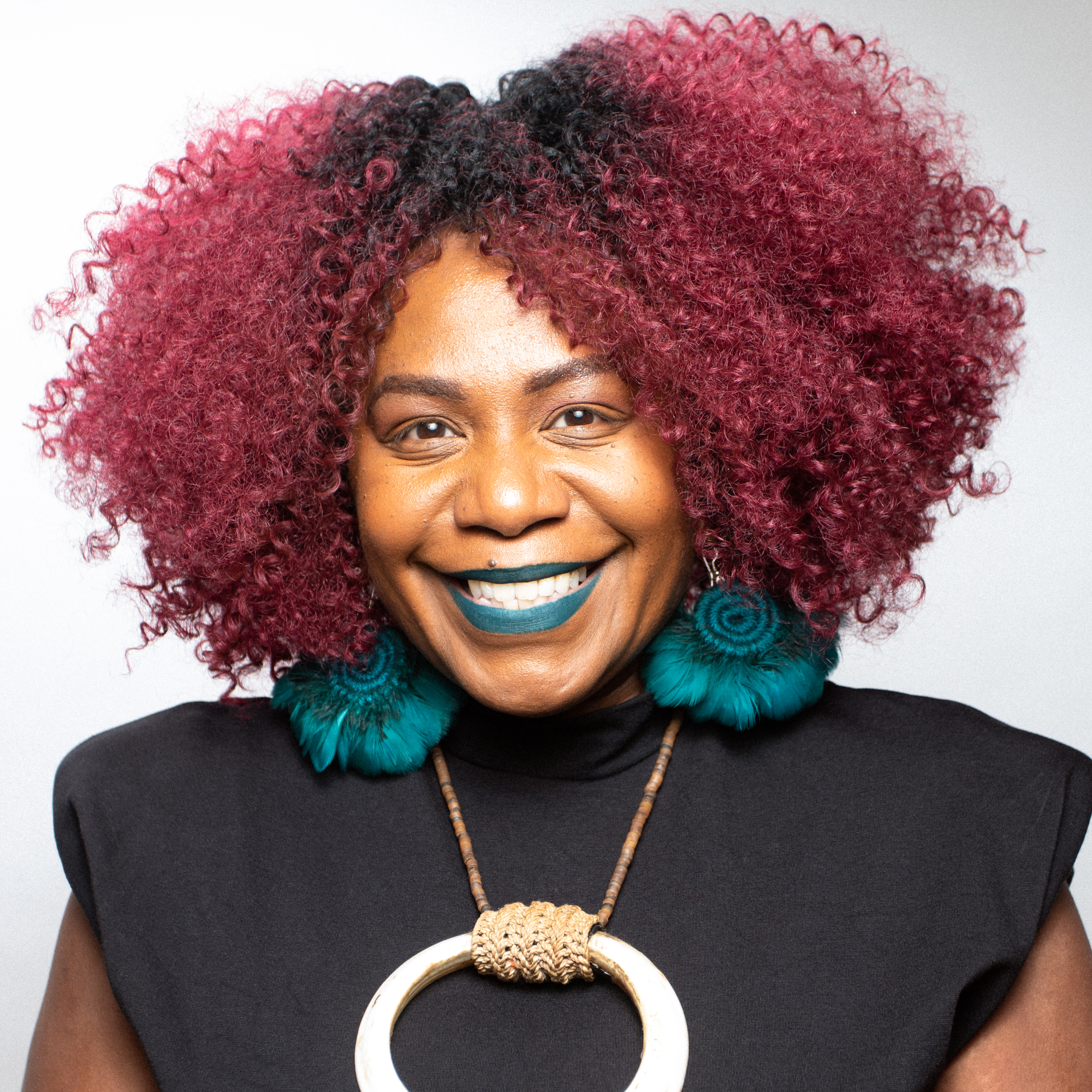
- Born: Melbourne, Australia
- Occupations: Radio and TV presenter
- Years active: 1994–present
- Father: Warium Benson

Namila Benson is an Australian radio broadcaster, podcaster, and television presenter, known for her work for the Australian Broadcasting Corporation, on Radio National and ABC Television. From 2021 to 2023, she hosted a weekly arts show on ABC TV called Art Works, and is the host and co-creator of the ABC TV show The Art Of... that began airing in June 2024.

== Early life and education ==
Namila Benson was born in Australia of Papua New Guinean parents. She is a Tolai woman from Rabaul in the East New Britain Province in Papua New Guinea, and was born in Melbourne, Australia.

Her father, Warium Benson, worked as a broadcaster for 36 years with Radio Australia, between 1975 and 2011.

== Career ==
Since starting in radio at Melbourne community broadcaster 3CR in the mid-nineties, Benson spent two and a half decades working across a number of media platforms, including as a field reporter on the Australian Broadcasting Corporation (ABC) television arts show, Art Nation, as a producer and presenter on Radio Australia's Pacific Service and presenter on 3RRR FM radio.

Between 2017 and 2019, she worked as a producer on the Radio National mornings program, Life Matters. In 2019, she moved across to presenting and co-producing the national visual arts program, The Art Show, on ABC Radio National.

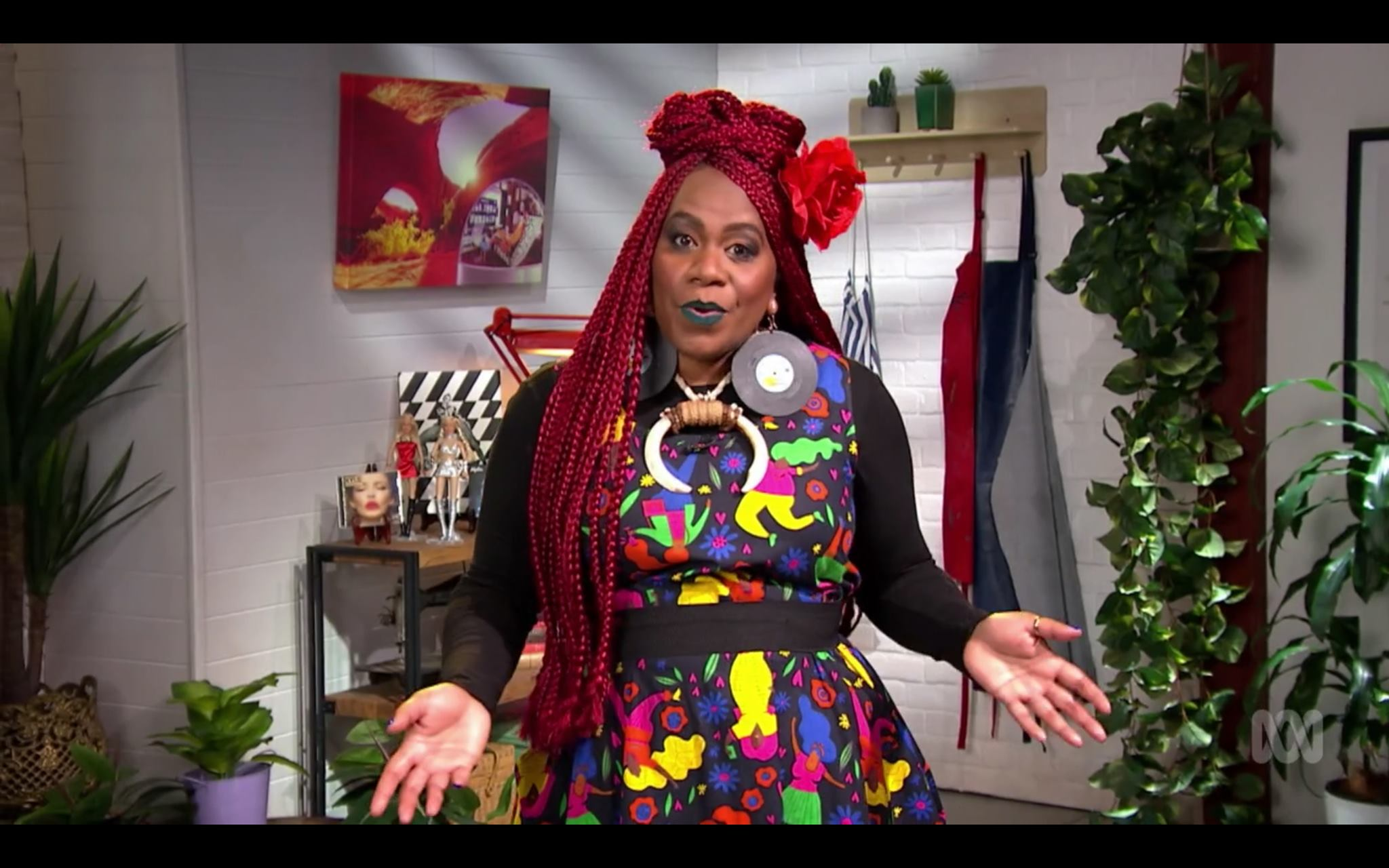
Benson, hosting Art Works, November 2021

Between 2021 and 2023, she hosted a weekly arts show on ABC TV named Art Works. Benson hosted 100 episodes of the ABC Television show Art Works across three seasons (2021, 2022 & 2023). Art Works aired on ABC TV and ABC TV Plus, and continues to be viewable on ABC iView.

In November 2023, the ABC announced that Benson would host a new TV arts show, named The Art of... which began airing in June 2024. Benson is the host and co-creator of the ABC TV show The Art Of... that began airing in June 2024.

Benson uses her platform to challenge cultural norms and encourage meaningful discussions. She has been vocal about the need for Australians to engage in "difficult, open, and honest conversations".

== Other activities ==
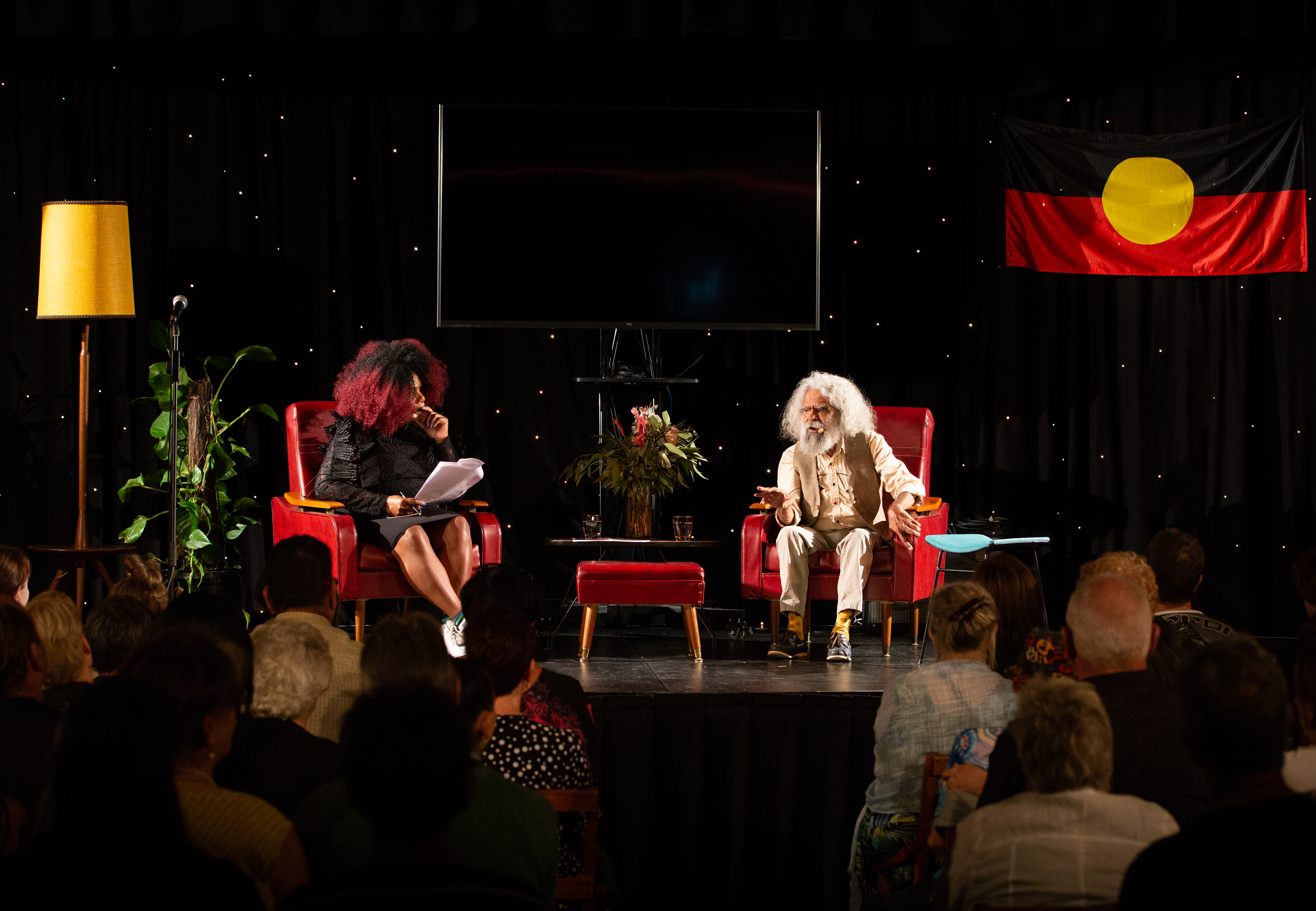
Jack Charles and Benson at the Melba Spiegeltent, March 2019

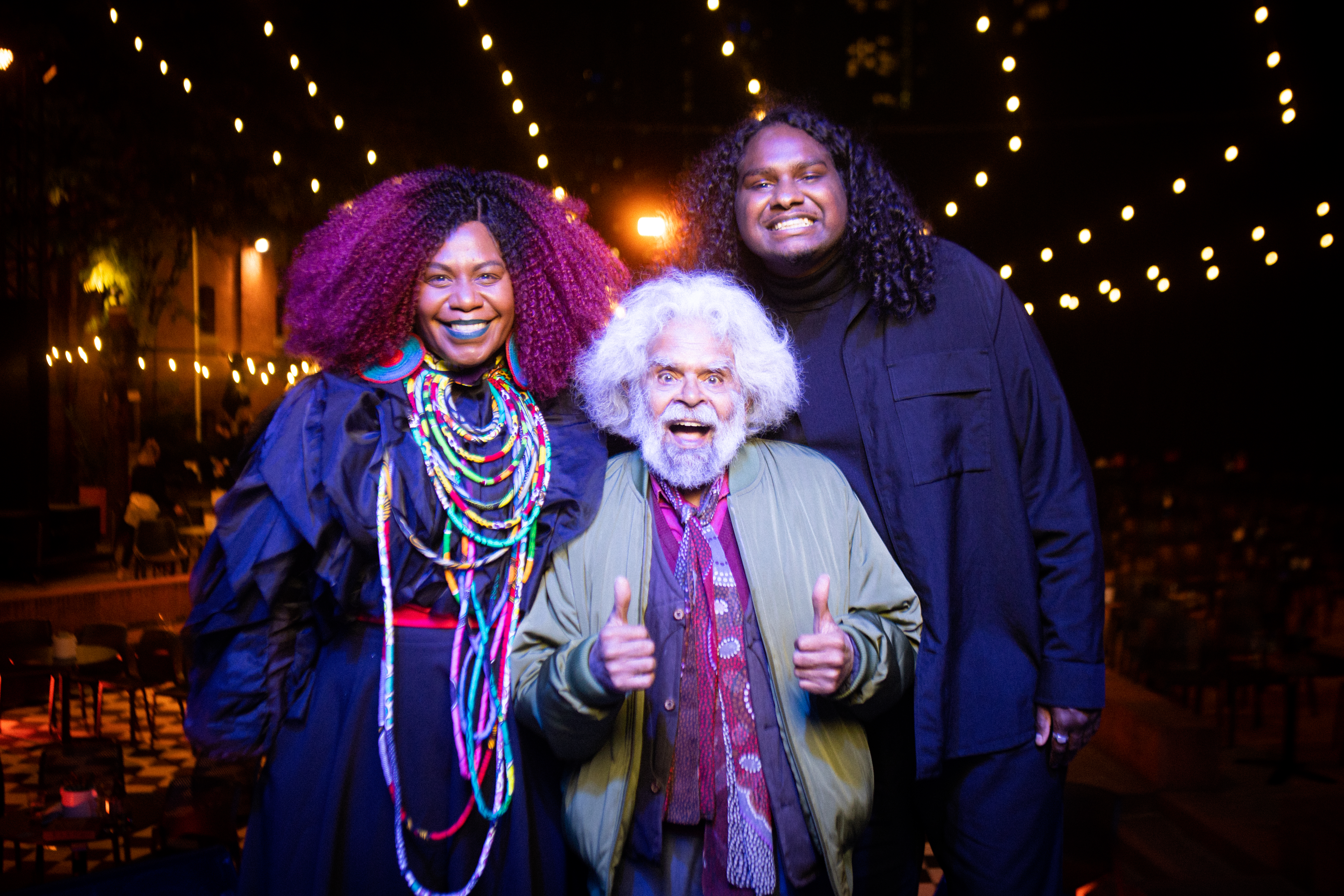
Benson, Jack Charles, and Baker Boy at "Night With Uncle Jack" at the Malthouse Theatre, Melbourne, November 2021

Benson has acted as a mentor to help young people get into media in Australia and abroad. She has run workshops at radio stations 3CR, SYN, PBS 106.7FM, and 3RRR.

In 2015, she worked in Papua New Guinea, running media training with producers, presenters and journalists from the National Broadcasting Corporation of Papua New Guinea.

In 2019, Benson hosted talks with Jack Charles and various special guests at the Melba Spiegeltent in Melbourne.

She hosted conversations with singer Archie Roach, and renowned First Nations elder, actor, and activist Uncle Jack Charles, at the Stories of Song and Resilience Event in December 2017 at the Sydney Opera House.

In 2019, Wil Anderson featured Benson on episode 151 of his podcast, Wilosophy.

For the 22nd Biennale of Sydney in 2020, titled NIRIN: Art From the Edge, focusing on international contemporary art by First Nations artists, she hosted a six-part podcast series called "Behind the Biennale".

In 2023, Benson hosted the annual Semi-Permanent and Never Permanent design festivals, interviewing speakers including: Sinéad Burke, Mona Chalabi, Mikaela Jade, Liam Young, and others.

In March 2024, she hosted the Australian International Documentary Conference Awards at ACMI, Melbourne.

Benson collaborated with Jack Charles on writing his memoir Jack Charles: Born-Again Blakfella, published on 18 August 2020 by Penguin Books. The memoir was shortlisted by the Australian Book Industry Awards as the 2020 Biography Book of the Year.

== List of TV series ==
=== Art Works season 1 ===
Benson hosted 33 episodes of the first season of ABC Television show Art Works in 2021, which began airing on ABC TV on 5 March 2021.

Episode	Guests and topics	Date aired
1	Uncle Jack Charles, Atong Atem, Ramesh Mario Nithiyendran	5 May 2021
2	Ziggy Ramo, Airi Ingram	12 May 2021
3	Opera Australia, Mary Quant, Siobhan Reddy, Natalie Aroyan	19 May 2021
4	Museum of Contemporary Art Australia & ABC Classic 100	26 May 2021
5	Miss First Nation & the Ramsay Art Prize	2 June 2021
6	Archibald Prize, Peter Wegner, Guy Warren (artist), Archie 100	9 June 2021
7	Kate Just, Great Woy Woy Tea Cosy Showcase, Andre Sardone	16 June 2021
8	Hilma af Klint, Incognito Art Show, Sue Cramer, Nicholas Chambers	23 June 2021
9	Dark Mofo 2021	30 June 2021
10	Megan Cope, Richard Bell (artist), Brian Robinson and Toby Cedar, NAIDOC Week 2021	7 July 2021
11	Just Not Australian Touring Exhibition	14 July 2021
12	Arts Access Victoria Amplify Festival, Heesco	21 July 2021
13	Maree Clarke, Science Gallery in Melbourne	28 July 2021
14	Supercell Festival of Contemporary Dance, Elisa Jane Carmichael, Sophie Fleming, Kate Usher, Brisbane Comedy Festival	4 August 2021
15	Deborah Cheetham Fraillon, Malthouse Theatre's Because the Night, Scattered, Anna-Wili Highfield	11 August 2021
16	Mo'Ju, Vipoo Srivilasa & The Wellness Deity Project	18 August 2021
17	Maxine Beneba Clarke, New Writers Collective & Alex Lahey	25 August 2021
18	National Aboriginal & Torres Strait Islander Art Award, Ishmael, Stone Country, Lorraine Kabbindi White, Ida Sophia	1 September 2021
19	Kylie Bracknell (formerly Kylie Farmer), Lucy Irvine, Demolition, Janelle McMillan, Polytoxic	8 September 2021
20	Boy Swallows Universe, Murrniny, Ngaiire	15 September 2021
21	Daniel Lafferty, Deborah Cheetham Fraillon, The Rivers Sing, Sami Shah	22 September 2021
22	Brenton E. McKenna, Mick Turner, Bukhchuluun Ganburged	29 September 2021
23	Claire McArdle, David Moran, Voices of Colour	6 October 2021
24	Lisa Waup, Sally Rees, Yhonnie Scarce, Nicolette Fraillon, Lee Lewis, Dalisa Pigram, Rachael Swain, #KnowMyName	13 October 2021
25	Muster, Terrapin, Dale Woodbridge-Brown	20 October 2021
26	First Nations Fashion and Design	27 October 2021
27	Bukhchuluun Ganburged, Vika and Linda, Jonathan Zawada, Ausmusic Month	3 November 2021
28	Art in the Vines, Patricia Piccinini	10 November 2021
29	OzAsia Festival, Koolbardi wer Wardong	17 November 2021
30	Neo Teen Takeover, Wendy Mocke, Fiona Lee	24 November 2021
31	Jazz Money, Tarnanthi, Serwah Attafuah	1 December 2021
32	Transformation, Time Pass, Baai	8 December 2021
33	La Mama Theatre (Melbourne), Stella Prize	15 December 2021

=== Art Works season 2 ===
Benson hosted 37 episodes of the second season of ABC Television show Art Works in 2022 which began airing on ABC TV on 16 March 2022.

Episode	Guests and topics	Date aired
1	Summer Arts Festivals, Arts Washing. Featuring Rachael Maza, Gabrielle de Vietri, Ali Murphy-Oates, Joshua Thompson, Sera Waters, Daniel Jaber	16 March 2022
2	Dean Cross x Sidney Nolan, Eucalyptusdom, Adrienne Doig	23 March 2022
3	Lorne Sculpture Biennale, Biennale of Sydney, Daina Sgarioto, Tamara Bekier	30 March 2022
4	WOMADelaide, Jaslyn Hall, Alex Seton, Parvyn Singh, Dya Singh	6 April 2022
5	Marco Fusinato, Melbourne International Comedy Festival, Louise Coghill, Frida Las Vegas	6 April 2022
6	Bundanon, Aretha Brown, Emma Donovan, Graeme McCullough	13 April 2022
7	AQAL, David Quirk, Caitlin Yeo, Sky Song	20 April 2022
8	National Indigenous Art Triennial, Sammy Hawker, Keva York	27 April 2022
9	Safa El Samad, Gabbi Bolt, Jordan Benson	4 May 2022
10	Venice Biennale, Deborah Kelly, Marco Fusinato, Parrtjima, Christopher Zanko	11 May 2022
11	Lissette Endacott, Katie West, Tamworth Country Music Festival	18 May 2022
12	Sydney Writers Festival, Chelsea Watego, Clementine Ford, Debra Keenahan, Eliza Hull, Nils Frahm, Tony Birch	25 May 2022
13	Australian Fashion Week, Dylan Mooney, Nicol & Ford, Alicia Crossley, Great Southern Dance, Dan Golding	1 June 2022
14	Vivid Sydney, Luca French, Billie Robertson, Sue Cato, Tiyan Baker, Tully Arnot, Amani Haydar, Cut N Polish	8 June 2022
15	Rising (arts festival), Zeina Thiboult, Luke Arnold & Richard Tognetti	15 June 2022
16	Sampa the Great, Rising (arts festival), Benjamin Law and Vanessa Alexander	22 June 2022
17	Dylan Mooney, Emma Donovan, Aretha Brown, Katie West and the National Indigenous Art Triennial	29 June 2022
18	Christopher Zanko, Sammy Hawker, Graeme McCullough, Bundanon Art Museum and Parrtjima Festival	6 July 2022
19	Dark Mofo, Alex Podger, Naomi Hobson, Cement Fondu, Stephanie Lake, Robin Fox and Phoenix Central Park	13 July 2022
20	Brisbane Street Art Festival, Jess Ribeiro, Second Echo Ensemble, Outside Boy and Miles Brown	20 July 2022
21	Back to Back Theatre, Noah Johnson, Soft Centre and S.J Norman	27 July 2022
22	Arts Week, Looking for Alibrandi, Megan Cope and the National Gallery of Victoria's Queer Exhibition	10 August 2022
23	Gay Hawkes, Abdul Abdullah, Dr Josh Harle, Tactical Space Lab, BLEACH and the Royal Theatre Winton	17 August 2022
24	Del Kathryn Barton, Blaze, Zahra Elham, Afghan Star, Sarah L'Estrange, the Miles Franklin Award	24 August 2022
25	Fangirls, Yve Blake, Kirli Saunders, The Minties, Omar Sakr, West Australian Symphony Orchestra, Blaze, Eunice Andrada & the National Poetry Month Gala	31 August 2022
26	Sydney Theatre Company, Bharatanatyam, Rukshikaa Elankumaran, Matthew Backer, Kip Williams, Rosie Dennis, Christine Johnston, Jordan Morrison, The Scramble Project	7 September 2022
27	Anna Cordell, Whitefella Yella Tree, Dylan Van Den Berg, Callen Purcell, Guy Simon, Vanessa Tomlinson, Cat Jones	14 September 2022
28	Dr Fiona Foley, COVID sonification, Dr Mark Temple, Holly Greenwood, Broome Performing Arts Co-Op, Justine De Bruyn, Amanda Riley	21 September 2022
29	Australian Centre for the Moving Image, Somebody's Daughter, Fiona Hall & AJ King	28 September 2022
30	Brisbane Festival & Club Weld, Dr Anita Heiss, The House of Alexander, Nina Gotsis, Olana Janfa, Jerrah Patston, Sam Worrad, Charbel Nehme, Club Weld, Joseph Williams, Erica Izett, Rupert Betheras	5 October 2022
31	Waru, Janice Wong, Nadurna, Ben Nguyen, Hunter Page-Lochard	12 October 2022
32	Virginia Gay, Cyrano, William Barton, Aunty Delmae Barton, Donna Kendrigan, David Humphries, Handmade Universe at the State Library of Victoria	19 October 2022
33	Rodney Bell, Alter State, Rooke Circus, Luke Whitten	26 October 2022
34	Jonathon Oxlade, The Australian Ballet, Tasman Keith, Keva York	2 November 2022
35	Bell Shakespeare, Gerwyn Davies, Kurt Boseke, FUNPARK arts festival	9 November 2022
36	Maria Tran, Gemma Black, Night Songs, Unpopular at the Powerhouse Museum, Liveworks Festival of Experimental Art	16 November 2022
37	Bangarra Dance Theatre, AI Art, Matt Hsu's Obscure Orchestra, Heather Rose	23 November 2022

=== Art Works season 3 ===
Benson hosted and/or appeared on the following episodes of the third season of ABC Television show Art Works in 2023:

Episode	Guests and topics	Date aired
1	WorldPride, Adelaide & Perth Festivals	12 March 2023
2	Sydney Modern, Thea Perkins, The Oscars, Kate Jinx, Jamie Tram	19 March 2023
3	Women of Troy at Hobart's Ten Days on the Island festival, Perun Bonser, Sammy Hawker, Nick Cave, and Warren Ellis	26 March 2023
4	Thom Monckton, Rose Riebl, Jamin, WOMADelaide	2 April 2023
5	Lucy Guerin, Adelaide Festival, The Sheep Song, Matt Sloane, Aurelia St Clair, Sashi Perera, Jason Tamiru	9 April 2023
6	Home of the Arts, Gold Coast, Rel Pham, Mia Salsjo, Jason Lim	16 April 2023
7	Jen Cloher, TMAG, Thabani Tshuma	23 April 2023
8	Reuben Kaye, Daniel Riley, Vieux Farka Touré	30 April 2023
9	wani toaishara, The Poison of Polygamy, La Boite Theatre, Queensland Theatre	7 May 2023
10	Kirsten Lyttle, Mithu Sen, Classics for Kids, Bandura	14 May 2023
11	Maggie Hensel-Brown, Leuli Eshraghi, Lacework, Perth Design Week, Eric Avery, Computer Art	21 May 2023
12	Jessica Cottis, Germaine Acogny, Slammed, Nani Puspasari, Rania Ahmed	28 May 2023
13	Ajak Kwai, Kaylene Milner, WAH-WAH, Nathaniel Youkhana	4 June 2023
14	Rod McNicol, Tina Turner, Ugly Art, Arts Project Australia	11 June 2023
15	The Torch, Vivid Sydney, UFO, Mdou Moctar	18 June 2023
16	Straw Marquetry, The Other Art Fair, Nabilah Nordin, Nick Modrewski, Zaynab Farah	25 June 2023
17	The Social Studio, Food Art, Cash Savage, Desire Marea	2 July 2023
18	Bobbi Lockyer, Dominic Guerrera, King Stingray	9 July 2023
19	ROCKAMORA, Evi Ferrier, Karen Marks, Kasper Schmidt Mumm, Aida Azin, Jason Phu	16 July 2023
20	The Huxleys, Fulu Miziki, Bruno Booth, Sarah Lock	23 July 2023
21	Jamaica Moana, Paul Ryan, Ida Sophia, Thando	30 July 2023
22	Tee Ken Ng, Jason deCaires Taylor, Mel Ree	6 Aug 2023
23	Lindy Lee, Halo Vocal Ensemble, Jordy van den Nieuwendijk, Satsuki Odamura	13 Aug 2023
24	Gallery of Modern Art, Brisbane, The Weekend, Brendan Huntley, Gary Bigeni, Nardi Simpson, Kaleena Briggs	20 Aug 2023
25	Now or Never Festival, State Theatre Company of South Australia, Joseph Tawadros, Zahra Newman, Melbourne Electronic Sound Studio	27 Aug 2023
26	Moulin Rouge! The Musical, Melbourne International Film Festival, The Chairs, Restless Dance Theatre	3 Sept 2023
27	Charis Schwarz, Judy Watson, Olivia Davies, Ernest Aines	10 Sept 2023
28	Raphaela Rosella, Mikaela Stafford, Sarah Mary Chadwick, Huda the Goddess.	17 Sept 2023
29	Arts Week 2023, Australian Tapestry Workshop, Nat Bartsch, Where Water Meets, Alice Lindstrom, Iran Sanadzadeh	24 Sept 2023
30	Desert Mob, Dalisa Pigram, Ron Hurley, Laurie May	1 Oct 2023

=== The Art Of... season 1 ===
Benson is the host and co-creator of the ABC TV show The Art Of...

Episode	Episode name and guests	Date aired
1	Heartbreak: Celeste Mountjoy, Clementine Ford, Emma Donovan, Josh Thomas, Yumi Stynes, Mary Mcgillivray	4 June 2024
2	Being Imperfect: Amanda Palmer, Audrey Powne, Yhonnie Scarce, Mary Mcgillivray, Richard Lewer	11 June 2024
3	Masculinity: Courtney Act (guest host), Winston McCall, Gil Jenek, Fez Faanana, Thomas Worrell, Dylan Rodriguez, Briefs Factory, Billy Bane, Mary Beard, Mary McGillivray	18 June 2024
4	Sex: Paul Yore, Kitty Obsidian, Michala Banas, Mary Beard, Vanessa Hughes, Mary McGillivray	25 June 2024
5	Making A Difference: Angélique Kidjo, Kutcha Edwards, Bimini, Mary McGillivray	2 July 2024
6	Rage: Nazeem Hussain, Christos Tsiolkas, Del Kathryn Barton, Barkaa, Mary McGillivray	9 July 2024
7	Being Funny: Shaun Micallef, Zainab Johnson, Dane Simpson, Badiucao, Mary Beard, Mary McGillivray	16 July 2024
8	Climate: Megan Cope, Yael Stone, Ghenoa Gela, Jessie French, Mary McGillivray	23 July 2024
9	Hair: Patricia Piccinini, Nyadak ‘Duckie’ Thot, Zeïna Thiboult, Manu Harrison, Mary McGillivray	30 July 2024
10	Starting Over: Osher Günsberg (guest host), Sam Kissajukian, Emma Watkins, Gavin Wanganeen, Audrey Griffen, Carl Villis, Mary McGillivray	6 August 2024
11	Motherhood: Del Kathryn Barton, Atong Atem, Ella Ganza, Kelly-Dawn Hellmrich, Prof. Mary Beard, Mary McGillivray	13 August 2024
12	Food: Matt Preston (guest host), Kirsten Tibballs, Ben Shewry, Jenni Kemarre Martiniello, Mary McGillivray	20 August 2024
13	Ageing: Yumi Stynes (guest host), Lindy Lee, Kathy Lette, Meryl Tankard, Maree Clarke, Mary McGillivray	27 August 2024
14	Sport: Elise Kellond-Knight (guest host), Otis Hope Carey, Michael Wilson, Tamara Oudyn, Mary McGillivray	3 September 2024
15	Money: Daniel Browning (guest host), Michael Zavros, Kay Abude, Richard Bell (artist), Andrei Molodkin, Mary McGillivray	10 September 2024
