= Georges Creek =

Georges Creek may refer to:

== Places ==
=== Australia ===
- Georges Creek (Armidale Dumaresq), a tributary of the Macleay River in New South Wales

=== In the United States ===
- Maryland:
  - George's Creek, Maryland, unincorporated community in Allegany County
  - Georges Creek (Potomac River), a tributary of the Potomac River in western Maryland
  - Georges Creek Valley is located in Allegany County, Maryland along the Georges Creek (Potomac River)
- North Carolina:
  - Georges Creek (Deep River tributary), a stream in Chatham County, North Carolina
- Ohio:
  - Georges Creek (Ohio Brush Creek), a stream in Ohio
- Pennsylvania:
  - Georges Creek (Monongahela River tributary), a stream in Fayette County, Pennsylvania
- Texas:
  - George's Creek, Texas, an unincorporated community in Texas
- Virginia:
  - Georges Creek (Whitethorn Creek tributary), a stream in Pittsylvania County, Virginia
- West Virginia:
  - Georges Creek (Kanawha River), a stream in West Virginia

== Other uses ==
=== In the United States ===
- Georges Creek Coal and Iron Company (1835-1863), a defunct coal mining, iron producer and railroad company that operated in Maryland
- Georges Creek Railroad (1853-1863), a railroad operated by the Georges Creek Coal and Iron Company in Western Maryland between Westernport, Maryland, and Frostburg, Maryland
- Georges Creek and Cumberland Railroad (1876-1917), a railroad that operated in Maryland between Cumberland, Maryland Lonaconing, Maryland
- Georges Creek Subdivision (1987-2015), a railroad line owned by CSX Transportation along the former Thomas Subdivision of the Western Maryland Railway (WM)
- Georges Creek Railway (2006), a 14-mile line shortline railroad between Westernport, Maryland and Carlos, Maryland

== See also ==
- George River
- George Creek
