= Georges River College =

Georges River College may refer to:

- Georges River College Hurstville Boys Campus
- Georges River College (Peakhurst Campus)
- Georges River College (Penshurst Campus)
- Georges River College (Oatley Senior Campus)

== See also ==
- Georges River
- George River (disambiguation)
