= Anthony Pateras =

Australian composer (born 1979)

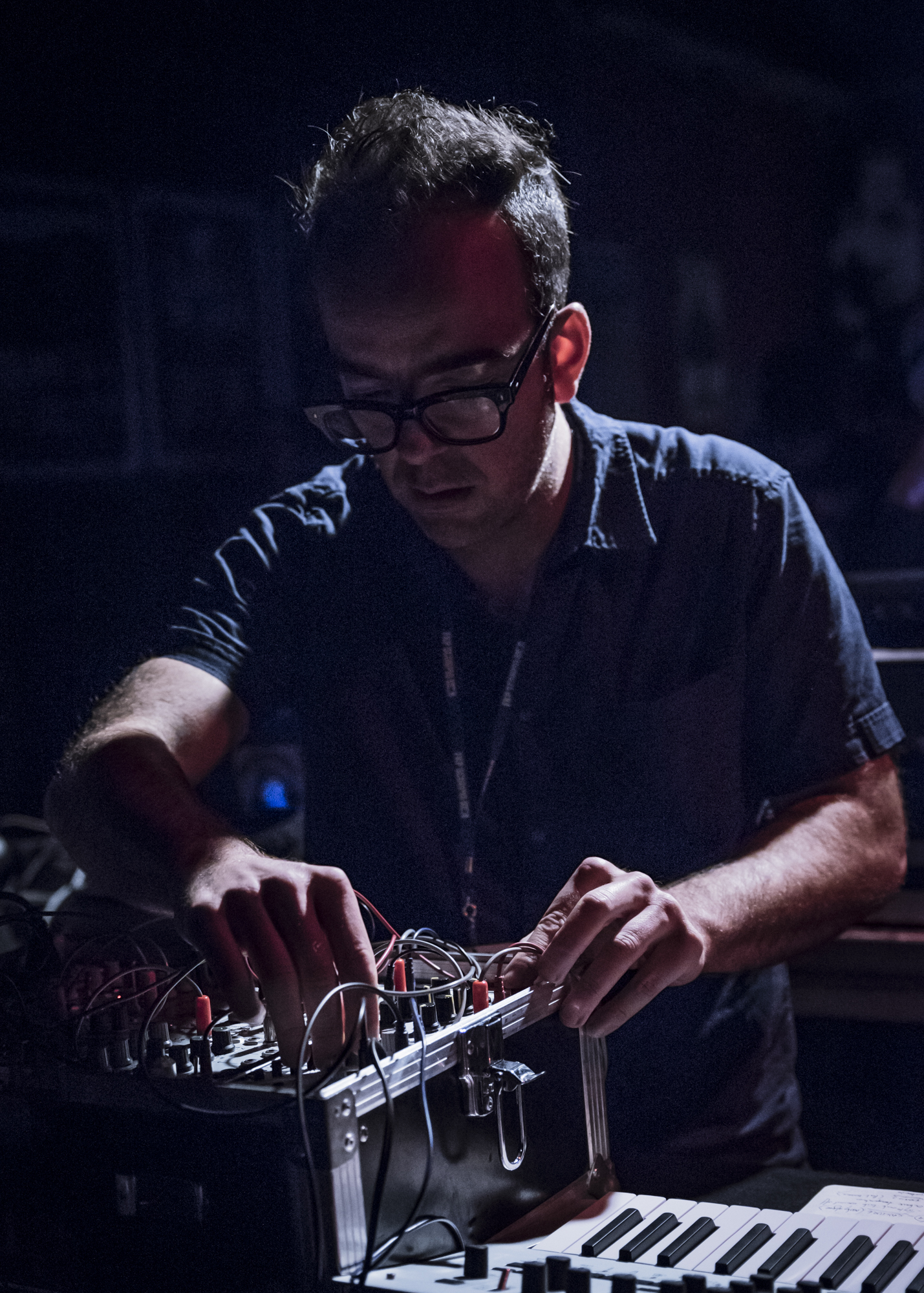
- Pateras, Live at Strom, Munich, 2018

Background information
- Born: Anthony Peter Pateras; 1979 (age 46–47); Melbourne, Victoria, Australia
- Genres: Contemporary classical; electroacoustic
- Occupations: Musician; composer; producer; conductor
- Instruments: Piano; prepared piano; synthesisers; vocals
- Years active: 1996–present
- Labels: Tzadik; Editions Mego; Immediata; Ipecac; Southern Lord; Penultimate Press; Second Sleep
- Website: anthonypateras.com

Anthony Peter Pateras (born 1979) is an Australian-born composer, pianist and electronic musician. He has released several solo albums and collaborated with other artists. Pateras has performed and recorded in Australia, North America and Europe. At the APRA Music Awards' Art Music Awards, he has been nominated three times: 2011 for Performance of the Year for his composition, Refractions, performed by Clocked Out and Speak Percussion; 2012 for Work of the Year – Instrumental for Flesh and Ghost performed by Speak Percussion; and 2015 for Performance of the Year for Beauty Will Be Amnesiac or Will not Be at All performed by Synergy Percussion.

== Early years ==
Anthony Peter Pateras was born in 1979 and grew up in Melbourne. He received classical training on the piano. His early band, Elemenopede, was formed in Melbourne in 1996 and played local venues including the Punters Club, Fitzroy. The line-up was Pateras on keyboards, Greg Craske on guitar, Luke Fitzgerald on drums, Dan Flynn on vocals and Mark Woodford on bass guitar. They released an extended play, I'm with Stupid, in May 1998, launched at the Punters Club, but they had disbanded by early 2001.

Pateras started tertiary education at La Trobe University, studying composition with Graeme Leak, Neil Kelly and John McCaughey. In 2007 he completed his PhD at Monash University with Thomas Reiner. Pateras' thesis was, "Exploratory combinations of composition, improvisation and electronics based on relationships between form and timbre."

== Solo work ==
=== 1999 to 2008 ===
As an undergraduate Pateras scored numerous theatrical productions at La Mama, The Carlton Courthouse, LaTrobe Student Theatre and Belvoir St Theatre. He was a sound composer for a play, Carboni, written by John Romeril and performed at the Carlton Courthouse in June 1999. For William 37 (November–December 2001) at La Mama, Pateras worked with Jeremy Collings on the soundscape, which Kate Herbert of The Herald Sun reviewed, "[it] has some appropriate and interesting moments but is often too loud, intrusive and poorly placed."

Between December 1999 and June 2001, he recorded Malfunction Studies, in Melbourne, New York and Copenhagen. Fellow musicians were Collings on cello, Elemenopede bandmate Fitzgerald on percussion, Justine Anderson as soprano, Jane Burnside on clarinet, Kathy Cameron as alto, Tom Chiu on violin, Matt Dowling on violin, Emily Hayes as mezzo-soprano, Luke Peyton on turntable and percussion, Helle Thun as soprano and Victorian College of the Arts' Percusion Ensemble on various percussion instruments. It was released as a CD album in 2002.

From 2001 till 2006 Pateras scored short films; two of which were accepted in the Cinéfondation section at the Cannes Film Festival: Ben Hackworth's Martin Four (2001) and Pia Borg's Footnote (2004). He curated the Articulating Space concert series from 2001, which transformed into the Melbourne International Biennale of Exploratory Music, in 2008.

Pateras' early works include the percussion solo Mutant Theatre, written for Vanessa Tomlinson and premiered in March 2001 at the Melbourne Museum. Mutant Theatre was issued as his solo album via John Zorn's Tzadik Records in January 2004. It was rated by AllMusic's staff writer as three-and-a-half stars out-of five. Pateras composed the tracks, provided piano, prepared piano and vocals, and conducted the session musicians as well as co-producing the work.

"Chromatophore for 8 amplified strings" was composed for the inaugural Cybec Melbourne Symphony Orchestra 21st Century Composers' Program in 2003. The piece was selected as a Recommended Work at the International Rostrum of Composers in 2004, and in 2006 was performed at Walt Disney Concert Hall by the Los Angeles Philharmonic, conducted by Brett Dean. He toured with the Australian Chamber Orchestra in 2007, composing "Autophagy, for amplified string quintet, prepared piano and electronics." The Sydney Morning Herald's critic Peter McCallum observed, "[it's] a rough sound world of spikes, thuds and wispy slides like black lines painted roughly on bare brick." Both "Chromatophore for 8 amplified strings" and "Autophagy" appear on his solo album, Chromatophore (September 2008). AllMusic's François Couture described the album, "there is no real theme, genre, form, or instrumentation running through the six works... except [his] creativity and broad palette."

=== 2009 to 2015 ===
Pateras composed and conducted a performance, Percussion Portrait, at the Melbourne Recital Centre in 2009. It brought together two groups: Clocked Out (Nozomi Omote, Vanessa Tomlinson) from Brisbane and Speak Percussion (Nat Grant, Peter Neville, Matthias Schack-Arnott, Eugene Ughetti) from Melbourne. Steven Hodgson of Australian Music Centre (AMC) reviewed the work's last part, Refractions (2008), "highly sectionalised, progressing from texture to texture with a continued sense that pitch and rhythmic materials have been selected to serve the instrumental combination in use at any particular time." At the APRA Music Awards of 2011, Refractions, was nominated for an Art Music Award for Performance of the Year as delivered by Clocked Out and Speak Percussion.

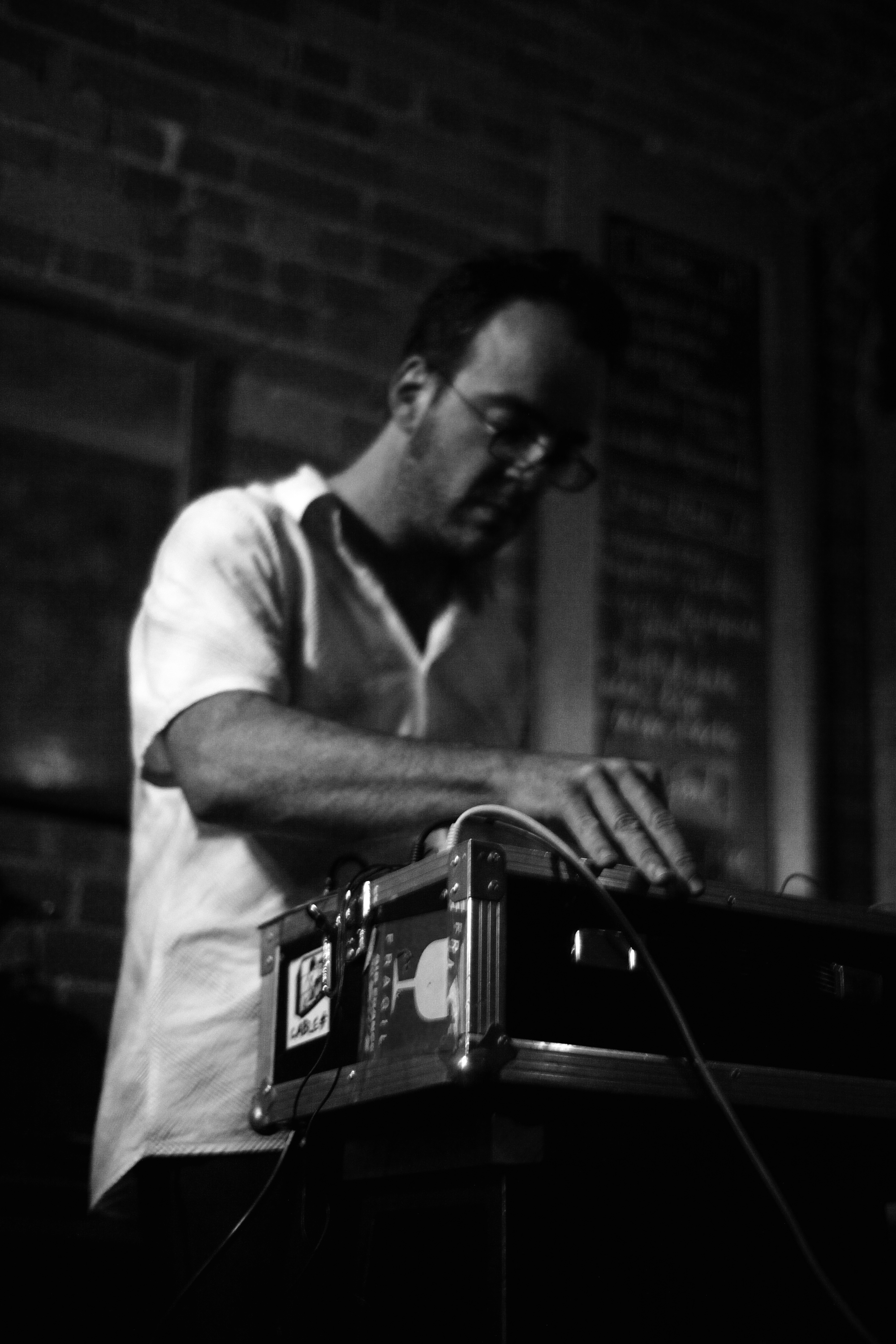
Pateras performing live, Melbourne, March 2012

At the APRA Music Awards of 2012 Pateras was nominated for Art Music Award for Work of the Year – Instrumental for Flesh and Ghost, which was performed by Speak Percussion in September 2011. The judging panel described Flesh and Ghost, as "a wonderfully epic piece where the composer utilises the 12-player percussion ensemble beautifully, creating a one sound world and a lovely sense of texture. It has a sense of space with spectrums of sound."

Pateras provided the score for the psychological thriller film, Errors of the Human Body (2012), directed by Eron Sheean and starring Michael Eklund, Karoline Herfurth, Tómas Lemarquis and Rik Mayall. The soundtrack album was released on Editions Mego. In that year he composed Ontetradecagon – his interpretation of jazz musician, Miles Davis' work. Pateras performed it live-in-the-studio for Andrew Ford's The Music Show on Radio National. RealTime journalist Chris Reid determined, "[it] pays homage to the experimentalism of both Davis and Stockhausen by exploring the conjunction of jazz improvisation and experimental music." The piece featured the composer on a Revox B77 tape recorder placed in the centre of the concert hall, with AAO members spaced about in six groups.

Synergy Percussion commissioned an hour-long percussion sextet from Pateras, Beauty Will Be Amnesiac or Will not Be at All for their 40th anniversary in 2014. The celebratory piece was premiered at Carriageworks. The Sydney Morning Herald's music critic David Vance noted "As the sound sources migrate from skins to metal, wood, and glass, individually or in combination, so too does the experience of these changing sonorities." At the APRA Music Awards of 2015 he was nominated for Art Music Award: Performance of the Year for Beauty Will Be Amnesiac or Will not Be at All, as performed by Synergy Percussion.

=== 2016 to current ===
In 2016 BBC Symphony Orchestra presented Pateras' composition Immediata at Maida Vale Studios under Brett Dean, with Thomas Gould as soloist and Pateras on a Revox tape recorder. That same year Toronto Symphony Orchestra performed his Fragile Absolute at Roy Thomson Hall, also conducted by Dean. Pateras was a Fellow at Akademie Schloss Solitude in Stuttgart in 2018. While there he recorded pipe organ for the song, "Troubled Air", on SUNN O)))'s album, Life Metal (April 2019).

Pateras' concert work, Pseudacusis, was commissioned by the 2019 Musica Sanae project to explore relationships between sound and medicine. Musica Sanae is a collaboration of three European realities: Phonurgia, Naples, In Situ Foundation, Sokołowsko (Poland) and NK Projekt, Berlin. Pseudacusis was performed in Naples, Sokołowsko, Kraków and Berlin. According to Pateras it was inspired by "auditory pareidolia, exploding head syndrome, otoacoustic emissions and psychoacoustics, in general." Pseudacusis, which was later issued as an album, is based on a live performance, on 27 September 2019, at the Sacrum Profanum Festival in Małopolska Garden of Arts, Kraków. Ben Harper of Boring Like a Drill reviewed the album, "By the latter half of the work, you’re wondering how much of the frenzied, stuttering percussion solos are happening in front of the audience and whether you hallucinated Pateras playing some cocktail lounge jazz rhapsody in amongst it all."

== Collaborations ==
Pateras has collaborated with various musical artists. He worked in bands: North of North, tētēma, Thymolphthalein, PIVIXKI, Beta Erko and Pateras/Baxter/Brown. He has formed duos with: Erkki Veltheim, Valerio Tricoli (as Astral Colonels), Jérôme Noetinger and Rohan Drape. Pateras has also collaborated with eRikm, Stephen O'Malley, Anthony Burr and Robin Fox.

=== Duo with Robin Fox ===
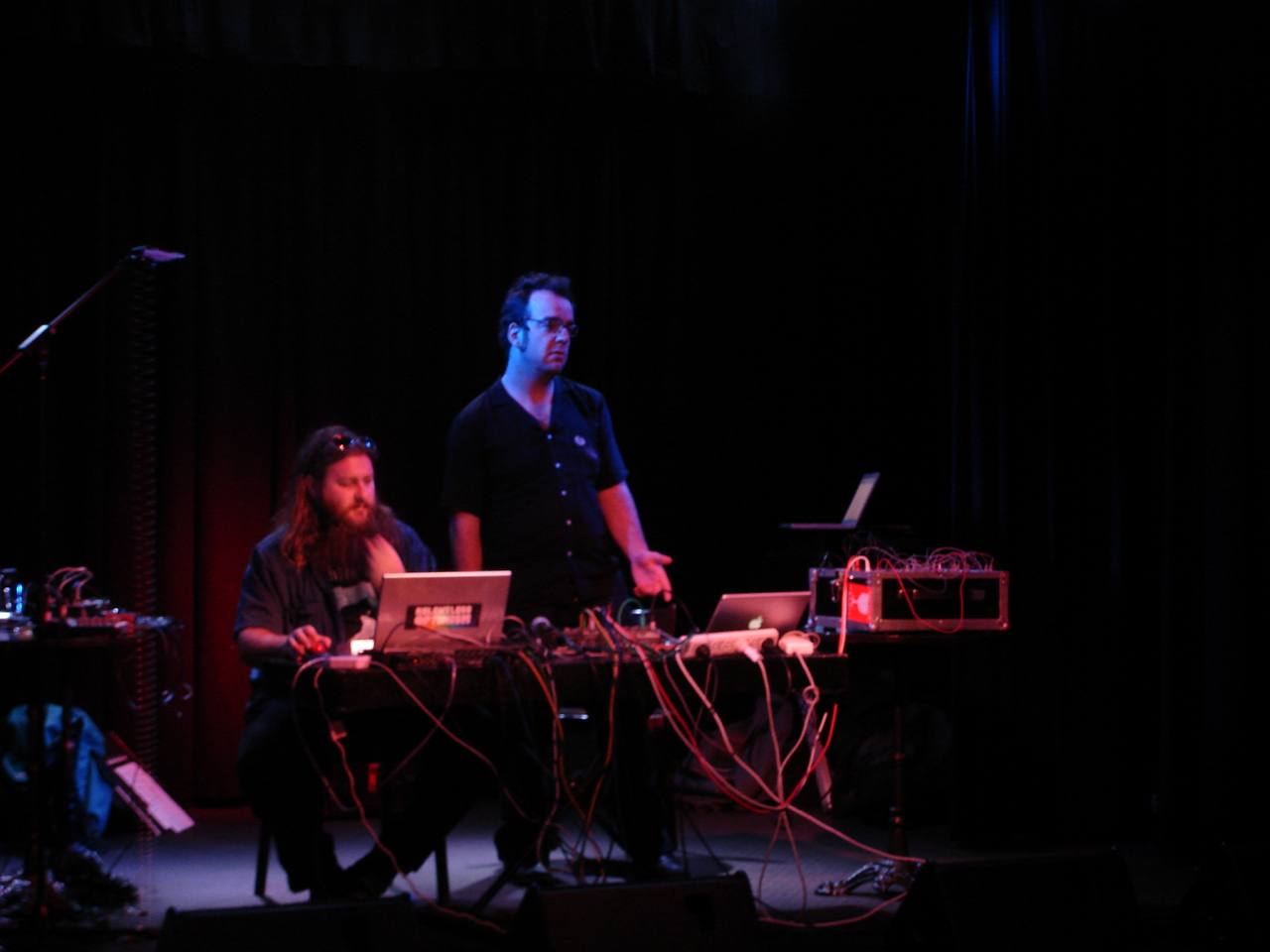
Robin Fox (at left) and Anthony Pateras (right), Toff in the Town, July 2008

Pateras met Robin Fox at La Trobe University in the late 1990s, where Fox was archiving recordings. Fox, an electro-acoustic improviser and composer, introduced Pateras to obscure Australian experimental music. In May 2003 Pateras and Fox released their duo album, Coagulate, via Synaesthesia Records. AllMusic's Couture opined, "[it] is blatantly maximalist: loud, occasionally harsh, very in-your-face and occasionally quite entertaining."

Their second collaborative album, Flux Compendium (March 2006), had Couture observe, "the two electronicians toned down the harsh noise in favor of a more discreet – and intriguing – sound palette. It seems these two can build impromptu compositions out of any type of sound: breath, belches, coins, laughs, doors, and yes, even pure electronic tones."

End of Daze, his third album with Fox, followed in January 2007, which Couture felt was, "chock-full of exciting experimental music, and nicely sequenced into a fun yet challenging listen... Samples and glitches are digitally treated and combined on the fly to produce fast-paced pieces that stand somewhere between sound collage and digital noise music."

=== Pateras/Baxter/Brown ===
In 2002 David Brown and Sean Baxter were performing in an art collaborative, Western Grey. Western Grey supported the launch of Pateras' album, Malfunction Studies at Footscray Community Arts Centre in July 2002. Consequently, Pateras/Baxter/Brown were formed as a trio in Melbourne in that year, with Pateras on prepared piano, Brown on prepared guitar and Baxter on drums. Their first album, Ataxia, appeared in June 2004. Cyclic Defrost reviewer, Bob Baker Fish observed that on the album, "the trio utilise a number of different techniques, yet repeatedly arrive at a similar minimal, almost silent location, which allows the individual sounds an additional emphasis or resonance."

In 2020 Baker Fish described the trio's music as "difficult to pin down but it was influenced by jazz, classical music, new music, extreme metal, sound art and free improvisational traditions." In Disclaimer, Baxter wrote, "Pateras/Baxter/Brown was originally conceived as a radical free jazz trio." He elaborated:

What rapidly coalesced in our discussions was to form a group combining traditional acoustic instrumentation to explore expanded sound-worlds with a conscientious collective listening dynamic, coherent compositional spontaneity and a total commitment to free improvisation.

On their second album, Gauticle, AllMusic's Couture noticed, "[they] play their instruments in unorthodox ways, looking for quiet, delicate sounds. Pateras spends most of his time inside the piano, hitting, scraping, and rubbing its strings." Peter Blamey wrote in RealTime in 2007, "what is most interesting about this music is the way small percussive events coalesce into streams and layers of sound moving at different speeds, each of these layers containing elements from all 3 players". In an interview about the album, Baxter stated, "these three very familiar acoustic instruments, each with traditionally unique sonic identities, have been approached by us in ways where their sounds become very unfamiliar." Sean Baxter died on 15 March 2020.

=== Pivixki ===
Pateras, on piano, keyboards and electronics, formed a Melbourne-based experimental music duo, Pivixki (formatted as PIVIXKI), with Max Kohane on drums in 2009. They issued their debut self-titled album in August of that year. Jade Cantwell of TheDwarf.com.au cautioned, "for the majority of listeners don't even bother. Demanding. Chaotic. Jarring. Off-putting." Their second album, Gravissima, appeared in 2010. Chicago Reader's Philip Montoro described Pivixki as grindcore piano, which "plays a futuristic, fractalized rendition of the style, a la Gridlink or Atomsmasher."

The duo sent a sampler to Ipecac Recordings, which was founded by Mike Patton (of Faith No More) and Greg Werckman (ex-DUH). Pateras caught up with Patton, when the latter visited Melbourne, they decided to perform together initially as Patton/Pivixki. Their show in San Francisco in 2011 was reviewed by Politusic's writer, who felt "Just when you'd think the entire thing was about to dissolve into total chaos, they would snap together in an instant and transform the mood into yet another new form. The onstage chemistry between all three guys was intense and sometimes funny."

=== Another Other ===
In 2013 Pateras, who was then-based in Berlin, collaborated with Natasha Anderson, Sabina Maselli and Erkki Veltheim on a large-scale audio-visual work, Another Other, for the contemporary opera company, Chamber Made. It is response to Ingmar Bergman's film Persona (1966), Veltheim explained:

It is not an adaptation, interpretation or version, you cannot recognise it in relation to the film. We see it as a new work that we say cannibalises the linear structure of the original. We take the skin off the film, extract the content and fill it with our own content."

The production had a season in Castlemaine (2014) and Melbourne (February 2016). Owen Richardson of The Sydney Morning Herald gave the latter performance four-out-of-five stars. He described how the four performers, "sit between two banks of seats, separated from the audience by semi-transparent screens: there are also screens behind the seats and to one side."

=== tētēma ===
Pateras collaborated again with Patton to establish the tētēma project. They released their first album Geocidal at the end of 2014. Danny Baraz of Janky Smooth felt it was, "nothing short of an abstract, conceptual masterpiece. There are no hooks here. This will receive no radio play – except, possibly from the least commercial, college radio stations."

The second album by the group, Necroscape, appeared in April 2020, with Pop Matters' Justin Vellucci declaring, "[it] is not a record of hits; instead, it unfolds in Bizarro chapters as a catalog of misses... [they] flesh out some interesting sonic touches and have a grasp on ambiance, sure. But, sadly, the compliments have to end there." While the staff writer from Smells Like Infinite Sadness observed, "[it's] very much a challenging listen... but its unique, crazy quilt mix of musical components should be just as engaging for any adventurous listener."

The tētēma project performed live at the 2017 MONA FOMA festival, Hobart. Writing in The Guardian, Shaun Prescott assessed that "tētēma didn't enrapture with anthems or token festival rock gestures, they enraptured with mood, with surprises, and with evocations rarely felt by audiences not inclined to spend their Friday and Saturday evenings in stuffy basement, warehouse or gallery venues."

== Musical approach ==
Pateras' Immediata, was cited by Musicworks' René van Peer as encapsulating his two compilation albums, Collected Works 2002–2012 (2012) and Collected Works Vol. II (2019) – each comprising five CDs. Specifically, van Peer felt that with Immediata, Pateras "synthesizes notation, improvisation and electroacoustic music." Philip Clark from Grammophone writes "there's no particular aural distinction between his composed and improvised work." Music critic Peter Margasak notes "Improvisation plays a big role in much of the music, but it's almost always situated within a rigorous compositional conceit." In an interview with The Quietus' Patrick Clarke, Pateras detailed his approach:

I feel that there are two poles you oscillate between as an artist, and they interact differently depending on the person. You can refine one approach forever until it becomes a singular thing, or you try a bunch of experiments with different strategies and see what happens. I very much fall in the second category.

== Discography ==
=== Solo albums ===
List of albums
Title	Album details
Malfunction Studies (Anthony Pateras and Victorian School of the Arts, Percussion Ensemble)	Released: 1 July 2002; Label:independent (self-released); Format: CD
Mutant Theatre	Released: 20 January 2004; Label: Tzadik Records (TZA 7095); Format: CD
Chasms	Released: 2007; Label: SIRR Records (sir 0030); Format: CD
Chromatophore	Released: 1 September 2008; Label: Tzadzik Records (TZA 8057); Format: CD
Errors of the Human Body OST	Released: 12 March 2012; Label: Editions Mego (eMEG O140); Note: Soundtrack album; Format: CD
Collected Works 2002–2012	Released: 30 April 2012; Label: Immediata (IMM001); Note: Compilation album; Format: 5×CD
Blood Stretched Out	Released: 2017; Label: Immediata (IMM008); Note: Live album; Format: CD
Collected Works Vol. II [2005-2018]	Released: 2019; Label: Immediata; Format: 5×CD, DL
Pseudacusis	Released: 2021; Label: Bocian; Format: CD

=== Anthony Pateras and Robin Fox ===
List of albums
Title	Album details
Coagulate	Released: May 2003; Label: Synaesthesia (SYN 007); Format: CD
Flux Compendium	Released: 7 March 2006; Label: Mego / Editions Mego (80); Format: CD
End of Daze	Released: 20 January 2009; Label: Editions Mego (DEMEGO 006); Format: CD

=== Pateras/Baxter/Brown ===
List of albums
Title	Album details
Ataxia	Released: June 2004; Label:Synaesthesia; Format: CD
Gauticle	Released: April 2006; Label: Synaesthesia (019); Format: CD
Interference	Released:2008; Label: emp.pl/records (emd. 008); Format:
Live at L'Usine	Released: 2008; Label: Cave12; Format: CD
Bern · Melbourne · Milan	Released: 2019; Label: Immediata; Format: CD

=== Pivixki ===
List of albums
Title	Album details
Pivixki	Released: 1 August 2009; Label: Sabbatical (SBB014); Format: CD
Gravissima	Released: 27 July 2010; Label: Lexicon Devil (LEXDEV030); Format: CD

=== Thymolphthalein ===
List of albums
Title	Album details
Ni Maître, Ni Marteau	Released: 2011; Label: Editions Mego; Format: LP
Mad Among the Mad	Released: 2015; Label: Immediata; Format: CD

=== tētēma ===
List of albums
Title	Album details
Geocidal	Released: 2014; Label: Ipecac; Format: LP, CD, DL
Necroscape	Released: 2020; Label: Ipecac; Format: LP, CD, DL

=== Anthony Pateras and Erkki Veltheim ===
List of albums
Title	Album details
Entertainment = Control	Released: 15 September 2015; Label: Immediata (IMM003); Format: CD
The Slow Creep of Convenience	Released: 2017; Label: Immediata; Format: CD
Duos for Other Instruments	Released: 2020; Label: All That Dust; Format: CD

=== Astral Colonels ===
List of albums
Title	Album details
Good Times in the End Times	Released: 24 March 2016; Label: Immediata (IMM005); Format: CD
The Difference of Similarity/The Similarity of Difference	Released: 7 June 2019; Label: Second Sleep (SSLP 090); Format: LP

=== North of North ===
List of albums
Title	Album details
The Moment in and of Itself	Released: 2016; Label: Immediata; Format:
North of North	Released: 2018; Label: Off Compass; Format: CD

=== Rohan Drape and Anthony Pateras ===
List of albums
Title	Album details
Ellesmere	Released: 2017; Label: Immediata (IMM012); Format: CD
The Traces of a Mistake, the Most Simple One Possible the Reactions of Even Younger Children	Released: 23 September 2021; Label: Superpang (SP095); Format: DL

=== Miscellaneous collaborations ===
List of albums
Title	Album details
I'm OK. You're OK (by Beta Erko)	Released: 15 March 2005; Label:Quecksilber Music (QUECKSILBER 9)/Inertia; Format: CD
Switch on a Dime (by Extended Pianos)	Released: 24 March 2016; Label: Immediata (IMM004); Format: CD
The Long Exhale (by Anthony Burr/Anthony Pateras)	Released:18 July 2016; Label: Immediata (IMM007); Format:
Music in Eight Octaves (by 176)	Released: 2017; Label: Immediata (IMM011); Format: CD
Rêve Noir (by Stephen O'Malley and Anthony Pateras)	Released: 2017; Label: Immediata (IMM013); Format: CD
Albédo (by eRikm & Anthony Pateras)	Released: 2019; Label: CCAM Editions/Vand'Oeuvre (VDO1951); Format: CD, LP
A Sunset for Walter (by Jérôme Noetinger and Anthony Pateras)	Released: 31 October 2019; Label: Penultimate Press (PP43); Format: LP, DL

=== Guest appearances ===
List of albums
Title	Album details
In the Pendulum's Embrace	Artist: Oren Ambarchi; Released: 2008; Label: Southern Lord; Format: LP
Black Sea	Artist: Fennesz; Released: 2008; Label: Touch; Format: CD
Life Metal	Artist: Sunn O))); Released: 2019; Label: Southern Lord; Format: LP, CD, DL

== Awards and nominations ==
=== ARPA Music Awards ===
The APRA Music Awards are held in Australia and New Zealand by the Australasian Performing Right Association to recognise songwriting skills, sales and airplay performance by its members annually. The Australian ceremonies began in 1982. In 2001, APRA joined forces with the Australian Music Centre (AMC) to present awards for Australian classical music, initially known as Classical Music Awards. From 2011 they were renamed as the Art Music Awards. Pateras has been nominated for Art Music Awards three times.

Year	Nominee / work	Award	Result	Ref.
2011	Refractions (Anthony Pateras) – Clocked Out and Speak Percussion	Performance of the Year	Nominated	
2012	Flesh and Ghost (Pateras) – Speak Percussion	Work of the Year – Instrumental	Nominated	
2015	Beauty Will Be Amnesiac or Will not Be at All (Pateras) – Synergy Percussion	Performance of the Year	Nominated	

=== Other awards and accolades ===
- 2004: Honourable Mention, Gaudeamus Music Week, for Twitch
- 2007: Ian Potter Emerging Composers Fellowship
- 2014: Sidney Myer Creative Fellowship
- 2017: ZKM GigaHertz Production Prize (shared with Valerio Tricoli)
- 2020: Michael Kieran Harvey Scholarship
