= Georges River College (Oatley Senior Campus) =

Georges River College Oatley Senior Campus

Location
- Oatley Ave & Hurstville Rd, Oatley, New South Wales, 2223; Australia; 33°58′36″S 151°04′51″E

Information
- Type: Government-funded co-educational comprehensive senior secondary day school
- Motto: Creating Your Future
- Established: 2001
- Educational authority: New South Wales Department of Education
- Oversight: NSW Education Standards Authority
- School code: 8284
- Principal: Anna Girginis
- Staff: c. 82 (2024)
- Teaching staff: c. 67 (2024)
- Years: 11–12
- Enrolment: c. 678 (2025)
- Website: oatleyseniorcampus.nsw.edu.au

Georges River College Oatley Senior Campus is a government-funded, co-educational senior secondary school in Oatley, a suburb in southern Sydney, New South Wales, Australia. Operated by the New South Wales Department of Education, the campus provides education for students in Year 11 and Year 12.

The campus forms part of the Georges River College, together with the Hurstville, Peakhurst and Penshurst campuses. The Oatley Senior Campus was established in 2001 and operates as the college's specialist senior secondary campus.

== History ==
Georges River College Oatley Senior Campus was established in 2001 as part of the Georges River College collegiate structure. The campus was designed to provide senior students with access to a broad range of Higher School Certificate courses and shared educational opportunities across the college.

Oatley Senior Campus has operated as a co-educational school for Years 11 and 12. The other Georges River College campuses transitioned to co-educational enrolment from 2025.

== Campus ==
The campus is located at the intersection of Oatley Avenue and Hurstville Road in Oatley. It is administered by the New South Wales Department of Education and is accredited by the NSW Education Standards Authority.

== Notable alumni ==
- Michael Auprince, OAM – Australian swimmer and wheelchair basketball player.
- Thomas Petrovski – Australian professional footballer.
