= George Creek =

George Creek may refer to:

- George Creek (Alberta), a stream in Canada
- George Creek (Asotin Creek), a stream in the U.S. state of Washington

== See also ==
- Georges Creek (disambiguation)
