= Fraillon =

Fraillon is a surname. It may refer to:

- Nicolette Fraillon (born 1960), Australian conductor
- Zana Fraillon (born 1981), Australian writer for children and young adults
