= Claire Field =

Australian artist and curator

Claire Field is an Australian curator and artist based in Sydney Australia.

Claire values broader discussions about value systems within the arts, emphasising care, ethics, and the social functions of contemporary art practices. She was the co-founder of the collaborative project Favour Economy, with Bronwyn Treacy and Alexandra Pedley, and subsequent co leaders Stella Chen and MX Tonié Field. Favour Economy was a digital platform for women artists and industry peers to share their experiences with others through an "audio favour". The project began in 2015 and produced 5 volumes, which were published annually as a podcast and online. In 2021 Claire Field and Stella Chen wrote the chapter Sharing Alternative Value in the Arts for Jacqueline Millner and Gretchen Coombs book Care Ethics and Art, published by Routledge. This chapter discusses the overlapping, varied, and conflicting perceptions of value shared to the project, and explore how these can inform alternative ethical frameworks that care for and value women working in the arts.

Favour Economy was a participant in the Doing Feminism; Sharing the World residency program (curated by Anne Marsh and Caroline Phillips), and the Aesthetics, Politics and Histories: The Social Context of Art 2018 AAANZ Conference at RMIT School of Art. Volume 1 (2015–2016) and Volume 2 (2016–2017) of the Favour Economy archives were installed as a participatory installation at George Paton Gallery, Melbourne and AIRspace Projects, Sydney (2017), with Volumes 1, 2 and 3 exhibited at Museum of Contemporary Art Australia (MCA) ARTBAR Things We Do Together curated by Lara Merrett in Sydney 2019, and again as a participatory sound installation as part of International Women's Day at the MCA in 2020.

Field co-curated, with Tian Zhang, the exhibition Site of Passage, at Customs House, NSW, in 2019. The exhibition included the work of nine contemporary Australian artists; Atong Atem, Cigdem Aydemir, Anindita Banerjee, Liam Benson, Vonda Keji, Nikki Lam, Nicole Monks, Raquel Ormella and Christian Thompson who each investigate aspects of who they are in their work and through this process claim parts of themselves that may have been complicated or obscured by colonisation, displacement or migration. Site of Passage referenced the history of the Customs House as a place of cross-cultural interaction as the point of immigration into Sydney for over 140 years and acknowledges that Warrane (Circular Quay) was the site of first contact between the Gadigal and the British, a moment in time that led to the invasion of Aboriginal land and the dispossession of Aboriginal people and their cultures.

In Field's practice as a visual artist, she exhibited work as part of the RMIT University VVitchVVaVVe Post Digital Aesthetics Symposium(2018 curated by Nancy Mauro-Flude and Tom Penney) and has held two solo exhibitions at Salamanca Arts Centre, Hobart: 2002 Kelly's Garden, curated by Arjan Kok, and 2005 Cluster Obscurer.
