= Atong Atem =

Australian artist

Atong Atem is an Australian artist based in Melbourne. She is known for her photography, including photographic self-portraits, but also creates paintings and other types of art. Her work has been widely exhibited, including at the Tate Modern in London, and a solo exhibition at the National Gallery of Victoria in 2026–27.

== Early life and education ==
Atong Atem was born in 1991 of South Sudanese parents in Addis Ababa, Ethiopia. She is of Dinka Bor heritage. When she was a few weeks old, her family moved to a refugee camp in Kenya, eventually migrating to Australia on a humanitarian visa when Atem was six, settling in New South Wales.

After switching from studying architecture, Atem studied painting at the University of Sydney, completing her studies at RMIT University in Melbourne.

== Career ==
Atem has mainly in photography, and is based in Melbourne, Victoria.

Around 2013, Atem created Studio Serie.

In 2021, she was commissioned to adorn two facades of Hanover House on Melbourne's Southbank. Her work, titled Outside Living, comprised a wallpaper design overlaid with LED lighting. In the same year, Atem released Banksia, a video exploring African immigration to Australia, which was shown at the Art Gallery of South Australia as part of the winter arts festival Illuminate Adelaide.

In 2023, she created a series of photographic works called Dust, featuring portraits of herself while heavily pregnant. The series centred on birth and death and the surrounding ceremonies, referencing Christianity and Dinka mythology. After having her child, she turned to painting.

As of 2026 she is represented by Sullivan and Strumpf.

=== Art practice and style ===
Atem's photographic work draws inspiration from Malian photographers Seydou Keïta and Malick Sidibé. According to Namila Benson, her works "confront and re-contextualise misrepresentations of Black bodies in art, capturing a contemporary era of African identity in Australia".

== Recognition and awards ==
- 2017: Brisbane Powerhouse Melt Portrait Prize
- 2018: Inaugural NGV and MECCA M-Power scholarship

== Exhibitions ==
Atem has had exhibitions at Melbourne's Immigration Museum, NGV's Triennial, Melbourne's winter arts festival Rising, Messums London, as well as works in Red Hook Labs (New York City), Vogue Fashion Fair (Milan, Italy) and the Unseen Amsterdam art fair.

She created the 2023 work Dust for an exhibition at PhotoIreland in June 2023. Her work was exhibited at the Tate Modern in London in 2023.

In November 2026, Atem became the first African Australian artist to have a solo exhibition at the NGV in Melbourne. The exhibition, titled Passage: The Art of Atong Atem is at NGV Australia, is on at the Ian Potter Centre until 14 June 2027. It includes Men in this Town, a series of photographs of herself wearing neon-coloured suits and a Stetson hat, and Stars and Constellations which she created for the National Maritime Museum in Amsterdam, Netherlands.

== Personal life ==
She married Otillo Page, and they have a son, Isagani, nicknamed Sesame. The birth of her son took 30 hours and affected her deeply.

She said in 2026: "I come from a culture where art-making, storytelling, myth, song, are an inherent part of the way we live life.
