= Wilma Smith (violinist) =

Fijian violinist (born 1956)

Wilma Smith (born 1956) is a Fijian-born violinist. She was born in Suva, Fiji and raised in Auckland, New Zealand. She has been concertmaster of the New Zealand Symphony Orchestra, and co-concertmaster of the Melbourne Symphony Orchestra in Australia from 2003-2014. She plays a 1761 Guadagnini violin. She was awarded the 2025 Sir Bernard Heinze Memorial Award.

== Career ==
Born in Fiji, Smith studied at Auckland University and had an early professional experience with the Auckland Symphonia (now Philharmonia) and New Zealand Symphony Orchestra. She then continued her studies in Boston at the New England Conservatory with Dorothy DeLay and Louis Krasner, playing in masterclasses for many others including Josef Gingold, Yehudi Menuhin and Sándor Végh. Smith was the founding first violinist of the Lydian String Quartet, prizewinners at Evian, Banff and Portsmouth International Competitions and winners of the Naumburg Award for Chamber Music. Although the Lydian String Quartet was Smith's professional focus in Boston, she also worked regularly in the Boston Symphony Orchestra and led the Harvard Chamber Orchestra, the Handel and Haydn Society and Banchetto Musicale, a period instrument baroque orchestra.

=== New Zealand String Quartet (1987) ===
An invitation to form the New Zealand String Quartet took Smith back to Wellington in 1987 and she was first violinist of the quartet until her appointment as Concertmaster of the New Zealand Symphony Orchestra in 1993. During her years with the quartet they toured New Zealand and Australia extensively and performed at the Tanglewood Festival. Prior to her departure for Melbourne, the NZSO honoured her with the title of Concertmaster Emeritus.

=== Melbourne Symphony Orchestra ===
Smith became Concertmaster of the Melbourne Symphony Orchestra (MSO) in 2003. The MSO's Chief Conductor Sir Andrew Davis has stated that, of all the performances of Ralph Vaughan Williams's The Lark Ascending he has conducted, Smith's was "unquestionably the most beautiful". He describes her as "an exceptional musician with whom [he] felt an immediate rapport".

In June 2013 Smith announced her retirement from the MSO from the end of the 2014 season.

=== Musical partnerships and collaborations ===
Smith has enjoyed a longstanding duo and chamber music partnership with New Zealand pianist Michael Houstoun. She was founding First Violinist of the Lydian String Quartet in Boston (1980-1987) and the New Zealand String Quartet (1987-1993). She is currently Second Violinist of the Flinders Quartet and violinist/curator of Wilma & Friends while enjoying piano trio collaborations with Yasmin Rowe and Yelian He in Rock, Paper, Scissors and with Laurence Matheson and Matthias Balzat in the Argyle Trio.

== Teaching ==
Smith is also a teacher of violin at the University of Melbourne, and privately.

== Personal ==
Smith's partner is Peter Watt, a computer consultant, with whom she has three offspring, Jay, Rosalie and Sophie.
