= Robyn Denholm =

Australian business executive (born 1963)

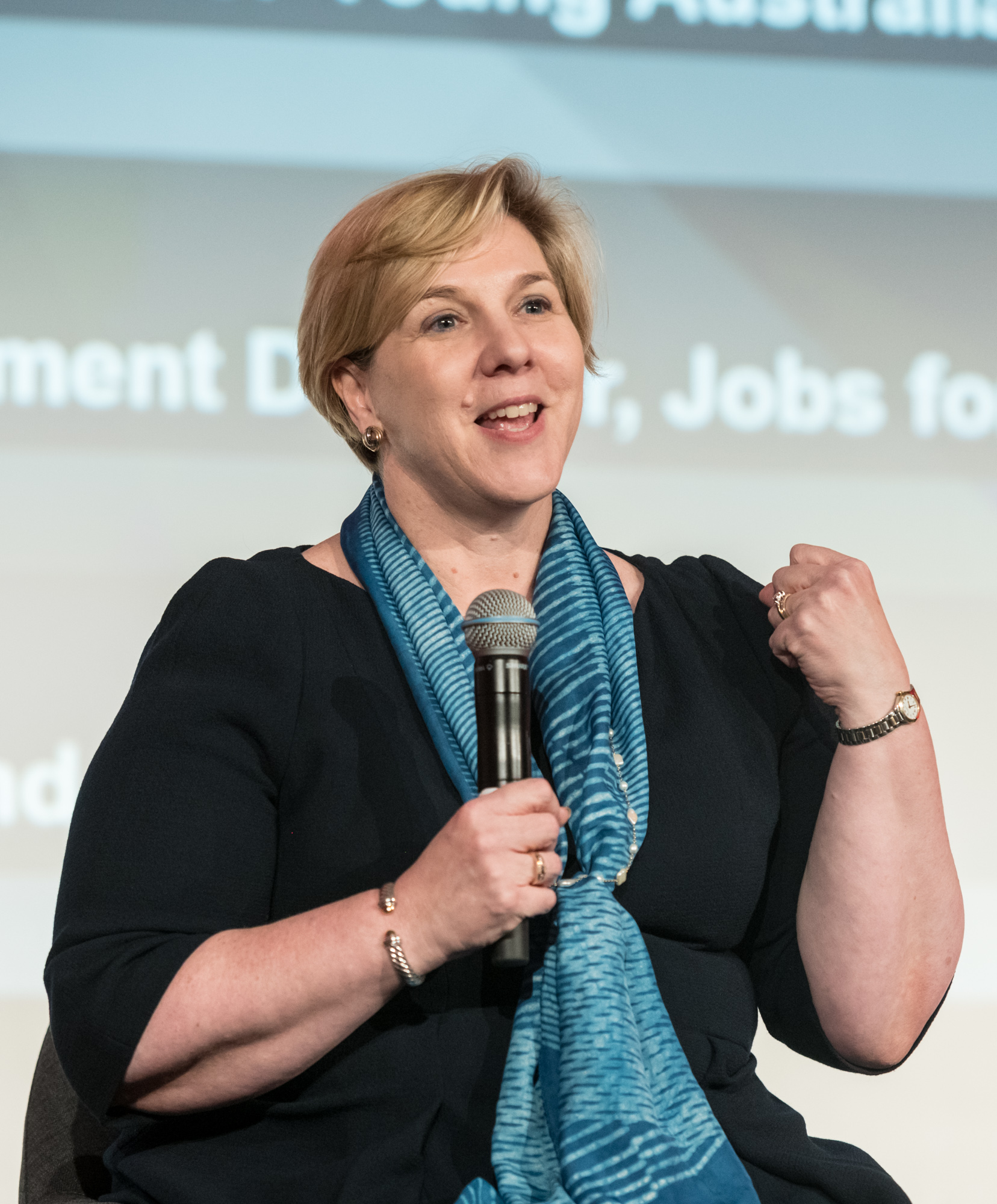
- Denholm in 2018
- Born: Robyn M. Sammut; 27 May 1963 (age 63); Milperra, New South Wales, Australia
- Education: University of Sydney (BA); University of New South Wales (MCom)
- Occupations: Chartered accountant; Chief financial officer
- Title: Chair of the Board of Tesla, Inc.
- Term: November 2018 – present
- Predecessor: Elon Musk

Robyn M. Denholm (/ˈdɛnhoʊm/; née Sammut; born 27 May 1963) is an Australian business executive and former accountant who is chair of Tesla, Inc. In November 2018, Denholm was chosen by Elon Musk to succeed him as chair of Tesla. She previously served as chief financial officer of computer hardware manufacturer Juniper Networks and Australian telecommunications company Telstra. Prior to her appointment, she was relatively unknown in the United States. As of 2025, she had the highest remuneration of any public company chair in the United States.

== Early life ==
Denholm was born 27 May 1963 in Milperra, New South Wales. Her parents met and married in Tripoli, Libya, immigrating to Australia in the 1950s. She has Maltese and Italian ancestry on her father's side and Maltese and Scottish ancestry on her mother's side; her father spoke five languages.

Denholm grew up in the Sydney suburb of Lugarno with her older brother and younger sister. Her father worked as a welder and her mother was a ledger machine operator. When she was seven years old, the family purchased a service station and workshop in Milperra. Denholm handled the financial accounts, repaired cars, pumped petrol and became interested in cars. She attended Peakhurst High School.

Denholm graduated from the University of Sydney with a bachelor's degree in economics, and from the University of New South Wales in 1999 with a master's degree in commerce. Denholm is a chartered accountant (generally equivalent to a certified public accountant in the United States) and a member of Chartered Accountants Australia and New Zealand.

== Career ==
After graduating, Denholm began her career at Arthur Andersen in Sydney in 1984. She became the vice president of finance for Toyota Australia in 1989, a position she held for seven years. She joined the finance division of Sun Microsystems in 1996, and relocated to Sun's offices in the United States in 2001, becoming head of its corporate strategic planning division. In 2007, Denholm was appointed chief financial officer of Juniper Networks and relocated to Silicon Valley.

Denholm joined Tesla’s board in 2014 as a director and chair of the audit committee, receiving approximately US$17 million in stock options during her tenure. She moved back to Sydney in 2017, when she took a job as chief operations officer at Telstra in early 2017 and was appointed chief financial officer on 1 October 2018, a role she held until May 2019.

Denholm was appointed chair of Tesla in November 2018, following a settlement between Tesla, Elon Musk, and the U.S. Securities and Exchange Commission (SEC) requiring Musk to step down from the role after his controversial 2018 tweet about taking Tesla private. By March 2025, she had reportedly received $682 million in cash and stock awards since joining Tesla and had sold approximately $532 million worth of stock. Denholm has faced scrutiny, including judicial criticism over her independence as Chair, and the outsized compensation packages awarded to her and to Musk, which she has defended pointing out that Tesla’s market value increased substantially under their leadership.

Beyond Tesla, Denholm has remained active in investment and sports. In January 2021, she became an operating partner at Blackbird Ventures, a venture capital firm. The following year, her family office, Wollemi Capital Group, acquired a 30% stake in the Australian basketball teams the Sydney Kings and Sydney Uni Flames.

== Personal life ==
Denholm is married to David Taylor, a retired electrical engineer. She has a son and a daughter from a previous marriage. She had her son at age 24 and she had her daughter in 1993. She moved from Sydney to Colorado with her children in 2001. She moved back to Sydney in 2017.

=== Net worth ===
Denholm debuted on The Australian Financial Review 2021 Rich List with a net worth of A$688 million. As of May 2025, her net worth was assessed at A$952 million on the 2025 Rich List. In 2023, Denholm was ranked 80th on the Forbes list of the World's 100 Most Powerful Women and was ranked 95th on Fortune's Most Powerful Women list.

Year	Financial Review Rich List		Forbes Australia's 50 Richest	
Year	Rank	Net worth (A$)	Rank	Net worth (US$)
2021	162 ▲	$688 million ▲		
2022				
2023	n/a	not listed		
2024	n/a	not listed		
2025	166 ▲	$952 million ▲		

Legend
Icon	Description
Steady	Has not changed from the previous year
▲	Has increased from the previous year
▼	Has decreased from the previous year
