= Sir Bernard Heinze Memorial Award =

Award for contribution to classical music in Australia

The Sir Bernard Heinze Memorial Award is an Australian music award.

== History and description ==
The award was inaugurated in 1982. It honours the memory of Sir Bernard Heinze (1894–1982), who for 31 years was Ormond Professor of Music at the University of Melbourne, and one of the major pioneers of orchestral life in Australia.

The award is in the form of a medallion and is given to a person who has made an outstanding contribution to music in Australia.

== Recipients ==
- 1986 Ruth Alexander
- 1987 Professor Emeritus Sir Frank Callaway AO
- 1988 Malcolm Williamson AO
- 1989 Patrick Thomas AM
- 1990 Beryl Kimber
- 1991 John Hopkins AM
- 1992 Leonard Dommett
- 1993 Peter Sculthorpe AO
- 1994 Yvonne Kenny AM
- 1995 Jan Sedivka AM
- 1996 Richard Mills AM
- 1997 Donald Hazelwood AO
- 1998 Richard Gill AO
- 1999 Don Burrows AO
- 2000 John Curro AM
- 2001 John Painter AM
- 2002 Stephen McIntyre AM
- 2003 Graeme Koehne AO
- 2004 Richard Divall AO
- 2005 Richard Tognetti AO
- 2006 Graham Abbott
- 2007 Barry Tuckwell AC
- 2008 Richard Bonynge AC
- 2009 Brett Dean
- 2010 Simone Young AM
- 2011 Carl Vine AO
- 2012 Roger Covell AM
- 2013 John Williams
- 2014 Anne Boyd AM
- 2015 Margaret J. Kartomi AM
- 2016 Mary Vallentine AO
- 2017 Ronald Farren-Price AM
- 2018 Judy Bailey OAM
- 2019 Deborah Cheetham AO
- 2020 Richard Letts AM
- 2021 Lyn Williams AM
- 2022 Piers Lane AO
- 2023 Nicolette Fraillon AM
- 2024 Linda Barwick AM
- 2025 Wilma Smith
- 2026 John Davis
