= Byron J Scullin =

- Also known as: Spiderface
- Origin: Australia
- Occupation: Composer

Byron J Scullin is an Australian composer and sound designer.

His sound design work has appeared in performances and exhibitions at National Gallery of Victoria, Rising Festival, and Dark Mofo.

His 2015 Dark Mofo art piece Bass Bath was a collaboration with the company Supple Fox, made up of Hannah Fox and Tom Supple. The work featured eight "2100 horsepower monolithic subwoofers" in the space which audience members could move around to change their experience, with the low tones causing a physical sensation across their body.

In 2017 he returned to Dark Mofo with Supple Fox. Their art piece Siren Songs included 450 speakers and a helicopter broadcasting sound around the city as part of the performance which The Guardian called "eerie, dark and beautiful." The work later toured the Perth Festival where it was reworked for the new setting. They then reimagined the piece as Clarion Call for a performance in Ipswich as part of SPILL Festival of Performance where it included local musicians Shirley Collins, Elizabeth Fraser, and Beth Gibbons.

Byron has released one single under the alias Spiderface. A Seasonal Gift was released in 2014 as a free single with David Thrussell. Elsewhere, he has worked with Francois Tetaz, Darrin Verhagen, Philip Brophy, and Midnight Juggernauts.

In 2016 he co-founded the Melbourne Electronic Sound Studio (MESS) along with Robin Fox, which contains a collection of synthesisers and other electronic music instruments available to the public.

In 2021, Scullin's work The Rivers Sing (created with artists Deborah Cheetham Fraillon and Thomas Supple) was presented as part of the RISING: festival in Melbourne. It was presented again as part of RISING: 2024.
