= Robin Fox (musician) =

Australian musician

- Born: 1973
- Origin: Australia
- Occupation: Musician
- Labels: Room40

Robin Fox is an Australian musician. He has released several solo albums as well as collaborations with Anthony Pateras and Oren Ambarchi. His work with Anthony Pateras has been noted for making a significant contribution to noise music.

His mother was an experimental music composer and his stepfather ran the computer music department at La Trobe University. After dropping out of law school, Robin decided to focus on music inspired by his mother's work. He later returned to studying and has a PhD in composition from Monash University and an MA in musicology, with published articles on experimental music and composition.

He has collaborated with his partner choreographer Stephanie Lake on several dance works, and has created sound and light-shows for Australian contemporary dance company Chunky Move. These included his work with lasers which led to him being nicknamed the "king of lasers", and has seen him tour around the world.

In 2016 he co-founded the Melbourne Electronic Sound Studio (MESS) along with Byron J Scullin, which contains a collection of synthesisers and other electronic music instruments available to the public. That same year he installed a giant theremin in Girgarre as part of the town's regional arts project.

In 2021 he released two new albums on Australian experimental music label Room40.
