= Deborah Cheetham Fraillon =

Australian singer, composer and Aboriginal leader

Deborah Cheetham Fraillon AO
- Born: Deborah Joy Cheetham; 24 November 1964 (age 61); Nowra, New South Wales, Australia
- Education: Bachelor of Music, NSW Conservatorium of Music
- Occupations: Singer; composer; arts leader
- Employer(s): Sydney Conservatorium of Music, Short Black Opera
- Spouse: Nicolette Fraillon (m. 2023)

Deborah Joy Cheetham Fraillon AO (born Deborah Joy Cheetham, 1964) is an Aboriginal Australian soprano, composer, and playwright. She leads Short Black Opera, based in Melbourne, which provides training and opportunities for emerging Aboriginal and Torres Strait Islander musical artists.

In February 2023, she was appointed inaugural Elizabeth Todd Chair of Vocal Studies at the Sydney Conservatorium of Music.

== Early life and education ==
Deborah Joy Cheetham was born in 1964 in Nowra, New South Wales. She is a member of the Stolen Generations, being taken from her mother when she was three weeks old and was raised by a white Baptist family. The musician Jimmy Little was her uncle.

She attended Penshurst Girls High School (now Georges River College (Penshurst Girls Campus)).

Cheetham graduated from the NSW Conservatorium of Music with a Bachelor of Music Education Degree.

== Writing and performing career ==
In 1997, Cheetham wrote the autobiographical play, White Baptist Abba Fan, which tells of her experiences of coming to terms with her homosexuality and racial identity while trying to reunite with her Aboriginal family. White Baptist Abba Fan has toured internationally.

As a soprano, Cheetham has performed in France, Germany, Switzerland, the United Kingdom, and New Zealand. She sang at the opening ceremonies of the 2000 Summer Olympics and the 2003 Rugby World Cup.

In October 2010, Cheetham's opera Pecan Summer, based on the 1939 Cummeragunja walk-off, was premiered in Mooroopna, Victoria. She wrote, composed, and performed in the production by the Short Black Opera Company. This was the first opera written by an Indigenous Australian and involving an all-Indigenous cast.

In 2018, Cheetham was one of 52 people who contributed to Anita Heiss's book Growing Up Aboriginal In Australia, along with Adam Goodes, Miranda Tapsell, and Celeste Liddle.

Cheetham wrote Australia's first requiem based on the frontier wars between First Nations people in south-western Victoria and settlers between 1840 and 1863. The requiem, "Eumeralla, a war requiem for peace" is sung entirely in the Gunditjmara language. The first performance of the requiem on 15 June 2019 featured Cheetham with the Melbourne Symphony Orchestra, the MSO Chorus and the Dhungala Children's Choir.

In 2021, Cheetham's work The Rivers Sing (created with artists Byron J Scullin and Thomas Supple) was presented as part of the RISING: festival in Melbourne. It was presented again as part of RISING: 2024.

Cheetham's second opera, Parrwang Lifts the Sky, premiered during Victorian Opera's 2021 season and was sung in the Wadawurrung language.

Her work Ancient Land Processional, performed in three Indigenous languages, was commissioned by the University of South Australia and is heard at every graduation ceremony.

In 2022, a new short work, Ghost Light, was performed as part of the Sydney Symphony Orchestra's "50 Fanfares" project.

== Academic career ==
In November 2019, Cheetham was appointed Professor of Practice at the Sir Zelman Cowen School of Music at Monash University. She is also the 2020 Composer in Residence at the Melbourne Symphony Orchestra.

Cheetham was appointed to the Sydney Conservatorium of Music in February 2023 as inaugural Elizabeth Todd Chair of Vocal Studies.

== Other activities ==
In May 2018 Cheetham also became patron of the Girls' Voices of the Cathedral choir (St Paul's Anglican cathedral Melbourne).

Cheetham has advocated for the lyrics to "Advance Australia Fair" to be rewritten.

=== Short Black Opera ===
Cheetham leads the national First Nations opera company Short Black Opera, based in Melbourne. It provides "training and performance opportunities for Aboriginal and Torres Strait Islander singers, composers, conductors, and instrumentalists", including running workshops for schoolchildren. The Short Black Opera for KIDS program was formed in 2009 in order to create a children's chorus to perform in Pecan Summer, which became known as the Dhungala Children's Choir and continues to operate.

== Personal life ==
Cheetham is openly lesbian. In 2022 it was announced that she was dating the conductor Nicolette Fraillon, and she is now known as Deborah Cheetham Fraillon, after the pair married on 2 January 2023 at their home in the Sydney suburb of Church Point. Previously, she had been in a long-term relationship with Toni Lalich, with whom she also enjoyed a lengthy artistic partnership.

== Awards and honours ==
In the 2014 Queen's Birthday Honours List, Cheetham was appointed an Officer of the Order of Australia (AO), for "distinguished service to the performing arts as an opera singer, composer and artistic director, to the development of Indigenous artists, and to innovation in performance".

In April 2018, the University of South Australia awarded Cheetham an Honorary Doctorate (D.Univ.) in recognition of her distinguished service to the community.

=== Australian Women in Music Awards ===
The Australian Women in Music Awards is an annual event that celebrates outstanding women in the Australian Music Industry who have made significant and lasting contributions in their chosen field. They commenced in 2018.

Year	Nominee / work	Award	Result
2018	Deborah Cheetham	Auriel Andrew Memorial Award	Won
2021	Deborah Cheetham	Lifetime Achievement Award	awarded

=== Bernard Heinze Memorial Award ===
The Sir Bernard Heinze Memorial Award is given to a person who has made an outstanding contribution to music in Australia.

Year	Nominee / work	Award	Result
2019	Deborah Cheetham	Sir Bernard Heinze Memorial Award	awarded

=== Helpmann Awards ===
The Helpmann Awards is an awards show, celebrating live entertainment and performing arts in Australia, presented by industry group Live Performance Australia (LPA) since 2001. In 2020, Cheetham received the JC Williamson Award, the LPA's highest honour, for their life's work in live performance.

Year	Nominee / work	Award	Result
2020	Deborah Cheetham	JC Williamson Award	awarded

=== Music Victoria Awards ===
The Music Victoria Awards, are an annual awards night celebrating Victorian music. They commenced in 2005.

Year	Nominee / work	Award	Result	Ref.
2021	Deborah Cheetham (with Byron Scullin and Tom Supple)	Best Experimental Act or Avant-Garde Act	Nominated	

=== National Live Music Awards ===
The National Live Music Awards (NLMAs) are a broad recognition of Australia's diverse live industry, celebrating the success of the Australian live scene. The awards commenced in 2016.

Year	Nominee / work	Award	Result
National Live Music Awards of 2019	Deborah Cheetham	Live Classical Act of the Year	Won

=== Victorian Honour Roll of Women ===
The Victorian Honour Roll of Women was established in 2001 to recognise the achievements of women from the Australian state of Victoria.

Year	Nominee / work	Award	Result
2015	Deborah Cheetham	Victorian Honour Roll of Women	awarded

=== Don Banks Music Awards ===
In 2023 Cheetham Fraillon was awarded the Don Banks Music Award in the inaugural Creative Australia Awards, taking the place of the Australia Council Awards. The Don Banks Music Award was established in 1984 to publicly honour a senior artist of high distinction who has made an outstanding and sustained contribution to music in Australia.

=== Red Ochre Award for Lifetime Achievement ===
Cheetham Fraillon received the 2025 Red Ochre Award for Lifetime Achievement for artistic excellence.
