= Georges Creek (Kanawha River tributary) =

Stream in the American state of West Virginia

Coordinates: 38°18′08″N 81°33′34″W

Georges Creek is a stream in the U.S. state of West Virginia. It is a tributary of the Kanawha River.

Georges Creek was named after George Alderson, a local judge.

== See also ==
- List of rivers of West Virginia
