= George's Creek, Texas =

Unincorporated community in Texas, United States

- Unincorporated community
- Location within Texas Location within the United States
- Coordinates: 32°17′39″N 97°38′16″W
- Country: United States
- State: Texas
- County: Somervell
- Elevation: 702 ft (214 m)
- Time zone: UTC-6 (Central (CST))
  - Summer (DST): UTC-5 (CDT)
- ZIP code: 76070
- Area code: 254
- GNIS feature ID: 1378349

George's Creek, also spelled Georges Creek, is an unincorporated community in northeastern Somervell County, Texas, located off of U.S. Highway 67.

== History ==
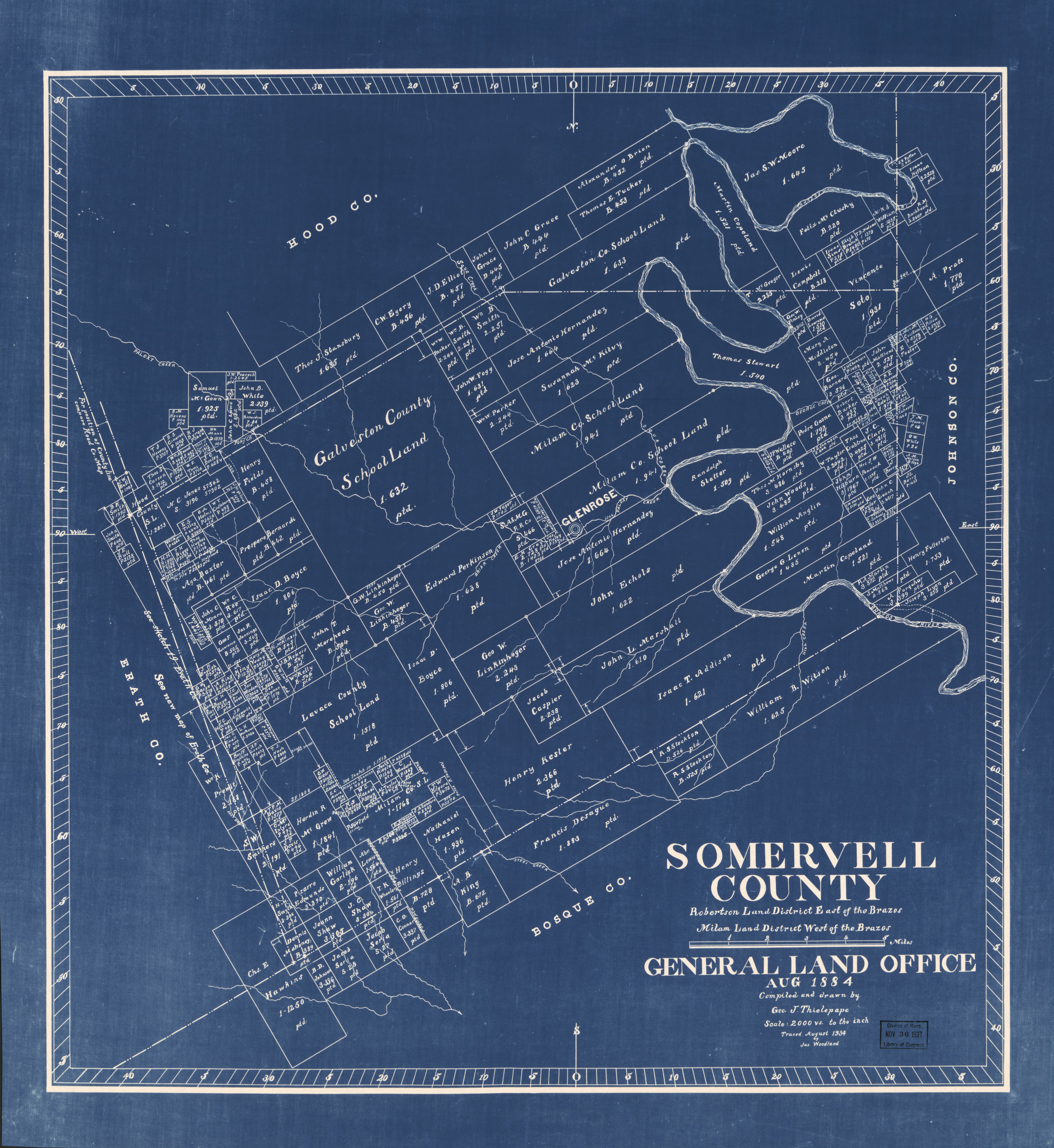
Land ownership map of Somervell County in 1884. Both George Barnard's and J.H. Chambers' plots are recorded

The community was a companion town to Fort Spunky and was developed on the 8-mile long George's Creek, a tributary of the Brazos River.

The community was located on land owned by George Barnard, an owner of several trading posts for Native Americans and the namesake of the aforementioned creek. He bought several thousand acres of land around the area. At the time, the community was part of Johnson County. J.H. Chambers and Norv Randle, the first settlers of the town, came in 1854. A copper and sulfur mine opened during the Civil War. After the war, many families came to George's Creek, most of them farmers. A cotton gin, school, church, and a cemetery operated in the town's business center following the influx of families. It became a part of Somervell County in 1875, following its transfer to Hood County at some point. A year later, a post office serving the community opened. A blacksmith, photography studio, shoe store, barbershop, doctor's office, and a telephone exchange all operated in the community at some point. In the 1880s, two Baptist churches served the community. Cumberland Presbyterian and Methodist congregations also existed. Following the advent of the automobile and paved roads, many residents moved to cities. Smaller farms were merged into large ranches and the population began to decline from 86 in the mid-1920s to 25 in 1960. The post office ceased operations in 1939. A population count in 1988 saw the number of residents rise back to 86. 66 was the recorded population in 2000 and 2010.

Every year since 1892, relatives of the early settlers meet at the cemetery and partake in a clean-up, dinner, and reunion on the grounds. Around 400 came in the mid-1970s. The creek proved to be rich in silica and a mine that specialized in the material thrived in the town around 1888. Unimin operates a silica mine on the banks of the creek today.

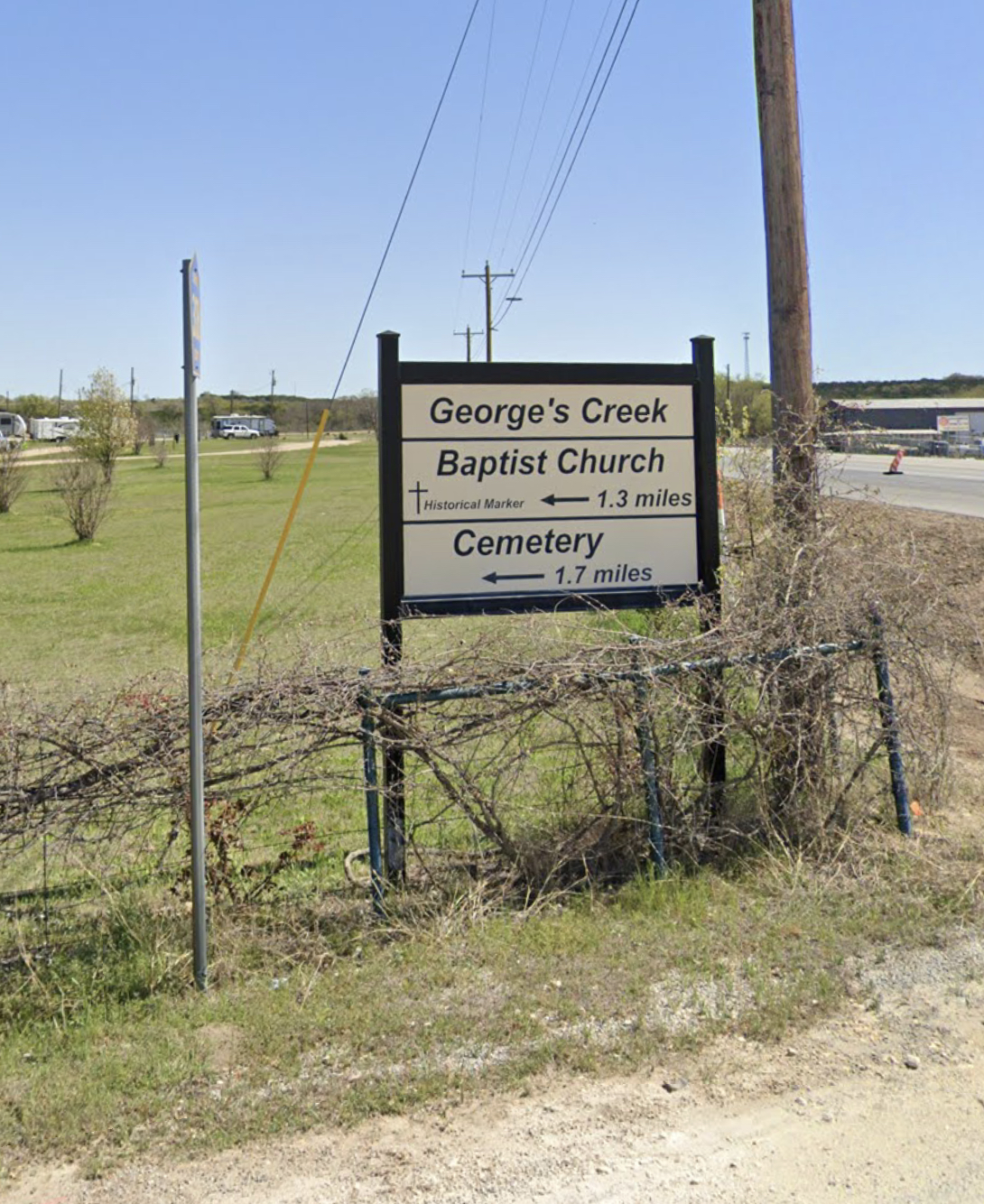
George’s Creek, Somervell County, Texas

George's Creek Baptist Church was established in 1885, with the sanctuary built in 1915 following various places serving as places of worship for the congregation, including the Methodist church, schoolhouses, and even tents. A video from The Atlantic documented the church and showed its decline from a thriving congregation to averaging an attendance of around six or seven people.
