= George Creek (Alberta) =

Stream in the country of Canada

Coordinates: 52.60003°N 116.60225°W

George Creek is a stream in Alberta, Canada. It is a tributary of the Blackstone River.

George Creek has the name of George Buxenstein, a land agent.

== See also ==
- List of rivers of Alberta
