= Georges Creek (Ohio Brush Creek tributary) =

Stream in Ohio, U.S.

Coordinates: 38°56′15″N 83°29′12″W

Georges Creek is a stream in the U.S. state of Ohio. It is a tributary of Ohio Brush Creek.

Georges Creek was named for the local George family of pioneer settlers.

== See also ==
- List of rivers of Ohio
