= Katie West =

Australian artist

Katie West is a Western Australian interdisciplinary artist. Her work often features dyed textiles and native plants, creating multi-sensory installations.

== Early life ==
West grew up in on a farm on Noongar country, north of Perth, and is of Yindjibarndi descent.

== Art practice ==
Her exhibitions often feature dyed textiles and native plants, sewn and woven. She exhibits multi-sensory installations. She documents the processes of her work as a form of storytelling. She often uses motifs such as baskets or digging sticks as critical commentary on how museum collections show "cultural objects and their makers as fixed in time".

== Recognition and awards ==
West won the Falls Creek Resort Indigenous Art Award and Dominik Mersch Gallery Award in 2017.

She was chosen as a participant in the Kickstart program in 2015 and exhibited at the Next Wave Festival in 2016.

In 2023, her work Fence lines & Digging sticks was selected as a finalist for the Ramsay Art Prize at the Art Gallery of South Australia.
