= PhotoIreland =

- Location within Central Dublin
- Established: 2009
- Location: 4 Temple Bar, Dublin, Ireland
- Coordinates: 53.3456°N 6.2638°W
- Type: Arts organisation
- Founder: Ángel Luis González
- Website: photoireland.org

PhotoIreland (originally PhotoIreland Foundation) is an Irish cultural organisation which organises the annual PhotoIreland Festival, and runs an exhibition space and bookshop called The Library Project in Temple Bar, Dublin.

== Foundation and development ==
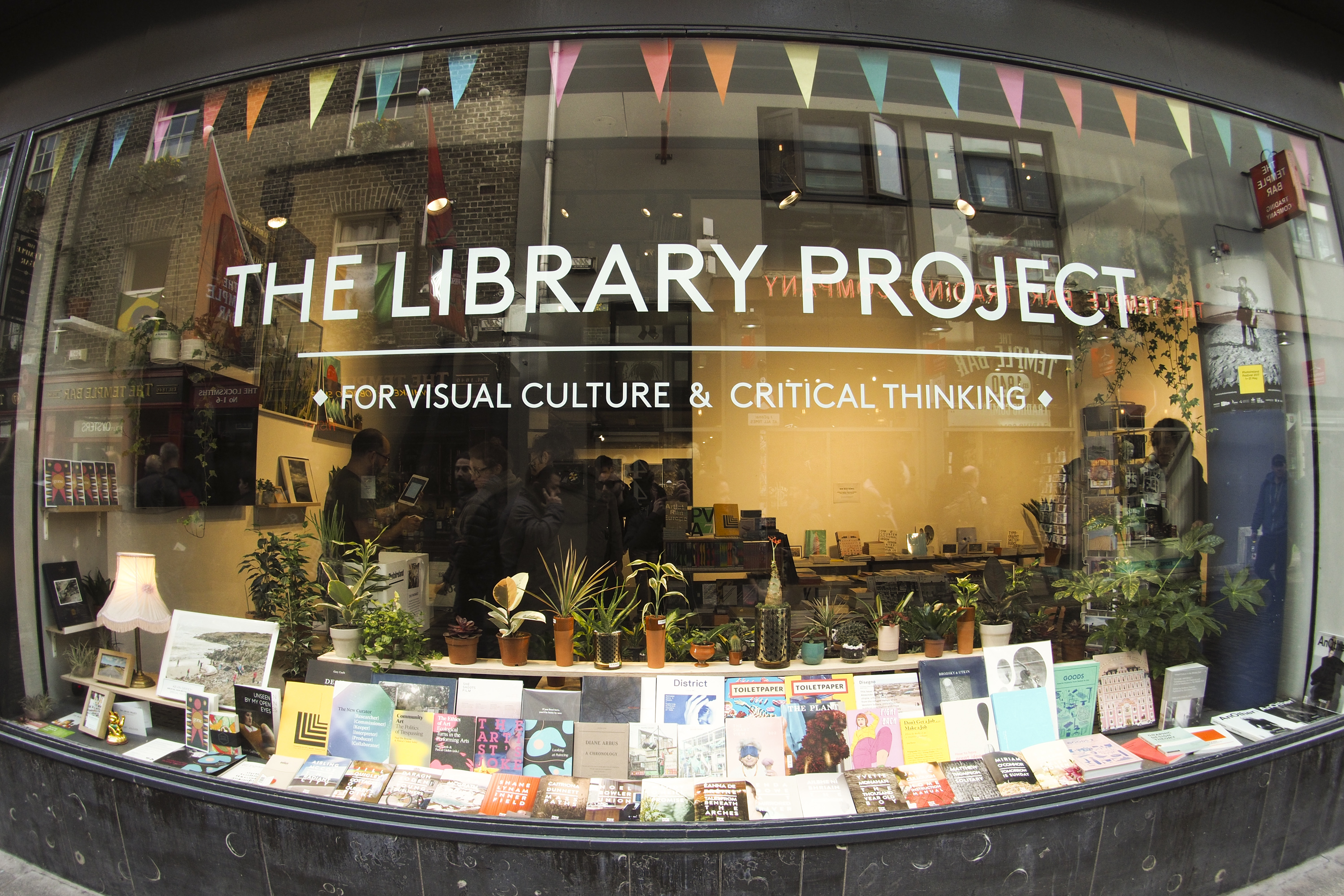
Window of the Library Project in Temple Bar

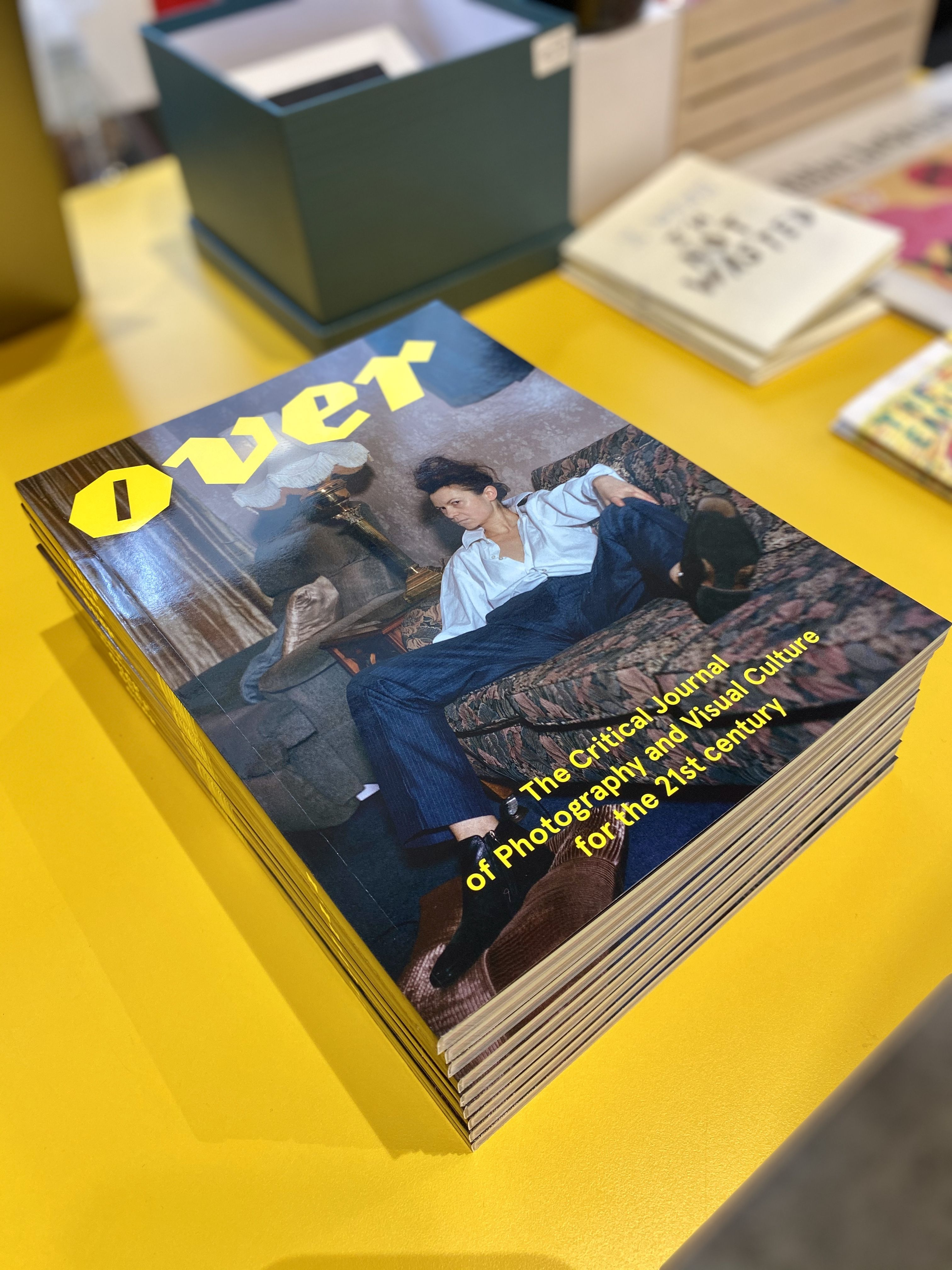
Over Journal, Issue 1, launched in July 2020.

PhotoIreland Foundation was founded by Ángel Luis González in 2009. It changed its name to PhotoIreland and now runs an annual PhotoIreland Festival and the Halftone print fair. Working with curator Moritz Neumüller, the organisation held its first annual (month long) "PhotoIreland Festival" in 2010.

The Library Project, a bookshop in Dublin's Temple Bar area, was founded in 2011. The bookshop specialises in books on photography, a library and a gallery space. It contains photo-books, fanzines and magazines relating to photography. It was initially part of a book fair and a collection of material that arose from that event in 2011. PhotoIreland and The Library Project found permanent premises in Temple Bar in 2013.

In 2020, PhotoIreland launched the publication Over Journal – the Critical Journal of Photography and Visual Culture for the 21st century.

In 2025, PhotoIreland opened a new photography venue, the International Centre for the Image, in Dublin's North Docklands. Upon its opening, the organisation's library moved from the Library Project premises in Temple Bar to the new venue in the Docklands.
