= George River =

George River may refer to:

- George River (Quebec), Nunavik, Canada
- Georges River, Nova Scotia, Canada
- George River (Southland), New Zealand
- George River (Marlborough), New Zealand
- George River (Western Australia)
- George River (Alaska), a river of Alaska

== See also ==
- Georges River
- George Rivers (1553–1630), English politician
- Georges River College (disambiguation)
