= Melbourne Electronic Sound Studio =

Music organization in Melbourne, Australia

- Abbreviation: MESS
- Formation: 2016
- Founder: Robin Fox and Byron J Scullin
- Type: Nonprofit
- Headquarters: Melbourne, Australia
- Location: The Atrium, Fed Square Melbourne, Victoria, Australia
- Coordinates: 37°49′03.8″S 144°58′09.9″E
- Website: MESS

The Melbourne Electronic Sound Studio (MESS) is an Australian independent non-profit arts organization founded by sound artists Robin Fox and Byron J Scullin in 2016. MESS features a collection of synthesizers, drum machines, and other electronic instruments which are available to use.

The instruments in their collection are on loan from local musicians, including major contributions from Tony Osmond and Gotye. Due to the size of the collection, only a third can be displayed at one time, so are rotated regularly.

Access to MESS is provided through an annual membership, allowing members to book out instruments and play them or record with them in the space. Notable international musicians who have visited include Legowelt, Clark, and David Chesworth who was their artist in residence in 2017.

MESS have also displayed their collection in exhibitions and public performances, which has included partnerships with Red Bull, Google, and the Grainger Museum.

On 27 March 2021, MESS Synthesiser Orchestra performed at the Sidney Myer Music Bowl Melbourne. The orchestra featured 40 synthesizers spanning from the 1960s to the present day.

On 21 May 2025, it was announced that MESS would move from their headquarters in North Melbourne to Federation Square's Atrium. MESS reopened on 19 September with plans for "expanded programs, greater accessibility, and the capacity to welcome more people than ever before to the studio".
