= RealTime =

Australian arts magazine

RealTime, also known as RealTime Arts, was a free Australian arts magazine, published by Open City in print from 1994 until 2015 and online from 1996 to December 2017.

== History ==
The free national arts magazine RealTime, also known as RealTime Arts, was launched in 1994 by Sydney-based writer/performers Virginia Baxter and Keith Gallasch. They had established a performance company called Open City in 1987, which became the publisher. The magazine, which focused on experimental and hybrid arts practices, was seed-funded by the Australia Council for the Arts, and secured ongoing funding after its popularity became evident. By the 2000s, it was a 56-page magazine produced bi-monthly, with 27,000 copies delivered to 1,000 locations across the country.

With its initial focus on contemporary innovative performance, theatre and dance as well as contemporary classical and experimental music, other media such as sound art, film, video and digital media art were also covered. It aimed to cover forms that were not being covered in mainstream arts magazines, and also focused on Indigenous Australian art and the work of artists with disability.

RealTime stuck to longform reviews, and "experiential" reviewing was encouraged, following Susan Sontag's, Deborah Jowitt's, Sally Banes' styles, based on perceptual phenomenology.

In 1996 the RealTime website was created, initially publishing reviews of the Adelaide Festival of Arts under the direction of Barrie Kosky. Thereafter the bi-monthly print edition was also published online, which expanded the readership considerably. More frequent emailed editions started to be produced from 2009.

The last printed edition was published in December 2015, with RealTime published weekly online. However with little opportunity to sell advertising, the magazine was no longer financially viable after 2017, so the decision was made to cease publication with the last issue of that year.

With support from the Australia Council, effort was concentrated into publishing a full archive of every issue, and the UNSW Library started work on creating fully searchable digital copies of the 130 editions of the print magazine from 1994 to 2015, for publication on the National Library of Australia's Trove website.

== Today ==
Today, the RealTime website includes digitised print editions from 1994 to 2000, plus all online editions from 2001 to 2018, as well as many other features. It has a portal for dance, featuring dance on screen and RealTime onsite at dance events.

== Other publications ==
RealTime received commissions from arts festivals all over the world, and in addition was called upon to publish other works:

- The In Repertoire series (1999-2004) promoting Australian art, commissioned by the Australia Council
- Dreaming in Motion, A Celebration of Australian Indigenous Filmmaking (2007), commissioned by the Australian Film Commission (still unique in its subject matter, as of 2021)
- Bodies of Thought: 12 Australian Choreographers (2014), sponsored by the Australia Council
