= Georges River College (Peakhurst Campus) =

Coordinates: 33.9669°S 151.0561°E

Georges River College Peakhurst Campus

Location
- Rona Street; Peakhurst, New South Wales; Australia

Information
- School type: Public comprehensive co-ed secondary day school
- Motto: Respect, Responsibility, Excellence
- Established: 1964
- School code: 8408
- Principal: Diane Wilson
- Grades: 7–10
- Enrolment: 835 (2025)

Peakhurst High School, also known as Georges River College Peakhurst Campus, is a Co-Ed middle school that offers comprehensive education from years 7 to 10.

Students who complete Year 10 at GRC Peakhurst Campus have a place in GRC Oatley Campus (11–12).

== Facilities ==
Facilities include:

- D Block – Maths & Computing. Consists of several maths classrooms and computer labs, as well as the school administration area on the lower level
- A Block – Design & Technology. Contains kitchens and textile rooms. Also consists of a computer lab, photography dark room, science labs, classrooms for special ed students, child studies room & more.
- E Block – English & HSIE. Consists mainly of English rooms, History rooms and Geography classrooms, but also science labs.
- C Block – CAPA – Contains several Art rooms, Woodwork and Metalwork rooms, Music classrooms, and some computer labs.
- F Block – Varied – F Block holds multipurpose classrooms. It contains a Japanese room, a dance room, PE rooms, a gym, and two science labs.

== Former well-known students ==
Robyn Denholm
