= Nicolette Fraillon =

Australian conductor

Nicolette Ella Fraillon AM (born 29 July 1960) is an Australian conductor, who was chief conductor of The Australian Ballet from 2003 until 2022.

== Career ==
Fraillon grew up in Melbourne, a child of immigrant parents of French Huguenot, Sicilian and Austrian Jewish descent. Her family is musical: both grandfathers were cellists, and her great-uncle Guillaume was principal double bass player with the Melbourne Symphony Orchestra.

She started violin and piano studies as a child; her teachers included Brian Buggy (violin) and Ada Corder (piano). She played with the Victorian Youth Symphony Orchestra and the Melbourne Youth Orchestra for some time.

As an adult she studied viola under Chris Martin at the University of Melbourne. She studied conducting at the Hochschule für Musik in Vienna, Austria, from 1984, and later in Hanover, Germany. Her professional conducting debut was with the Nederlands Dans Theater, when she deputised for another conductor who had fallen ill. In the Netherlands, she also worked on a production of Les Misérables, both playing viola in the orchestra and working as second conductor. Later she was appointed music director and chief conductor of the Dutch National Ballet.

In 1995 she was engaged by the Tasmanian Symphony Orchestra, becoming the first Australian woman to conduct an Australian symphony orchestra. She later conducted the West Australian Symphony Orchestra.

In October 1997 Fraillon was appointed director of the Canberra School of Music, effective from June 1998. In 1998 she commenced at the Australian Opera and Ballet Orchestra. In 2003 she was appointed chief conductor of The Australian Ballet. She was their first woman conductor, and, in 2016, the world's only woman music director of a ballet company. In November 2021, Fraillon announced that she would leave that position in 2022. In 2023, she was awarded the Sir Bernard Heinze Memorial Award.

== Personal life ==
Fraillon has been married three times, and has two sons. She has been married to soprano Deborah Cheetham Fraillon since January 2023.
