= Georges River College (Penshurst Campus) =

Georges River College Penshurst Campus

Location
- 2 Austral Street; Penshurst, New South Wales, 2222; Australia; 33°57′53″S 151°05′10″E

Information
- Former names: Penshurst Secondary Home Science School (1955–1958); Penshurst Girls High School (1959–2000); Georges River College Penshurst Girls Campus (2001–2024)
- School type: Public comprehensive co-ed secondary day school
- Motto: Creating Your Future
- Established: 1955
- Educational authority: NSW Department of Education
- School code: 8857
- Principal: Noeline Ross
- Years: 7–10
- Enrolment: 540 (2026)
- Colours: Navy and light blue
- Website: penshurst-h.schools.nsw.gov.au/

Georges River College Penshurst Campus is a comprehensive co-educational secondary school, located in the suburb of Penshurst, in Sydney, New South Wales, Australia.

== Notable alumni ==
- Deborah Cheetham AO, Aboriginal Australian soprano, actor, composer and playwright.
