= Rising (festival) =

Annual arts festival in Melbourne, Australia

RISING
- 2024 festival banner
- Genre: Major arts, theatre, music and cultural festival
- Frequency: Annually
- Locations: Melbourne, Australia
- Years active: 4
- Inaugurated: 2022
- Attendance: 753,0000 (2023)
- Patron: Creative Victoria
- Website: rising.melbourne

Rising (stylised RISING) is a city-wide arts festival held in Melbourne, Australia. The festival was announced in 2020 as Melbourne's premier arts and culture festival, replacing the Melbourne International Arts Festival and White Night Festival, and is supported by the Victoria State Government. Following two attempts to launch the festival in 2020 and 2021 disrupted by the coronavirus pandemic, Rising has been held annually each June in Melbourne from 2022. The festival has received praise for the depth and variety of its events and First Nations programming, whilst also receiving critiques about its ability to capture the purpose and identity of its predecessors.

== History ==
=== Origins and initial attempts ===
Rising was conceived by co-artistic directors Gideon Obarzanek and Hannah Fox, both artists with previous directorial experience in the creative industries and arts festivals including Dark Mofo, the Melbourne Festival and Melbourne Fringe Festival. The festival was first proposed in 2020 as a replacement for the Melbourne International Arts Festival and White Night Festival, and received support from state Government agencies to provide $2 million in funding, seeking a expressions of interest for grants to local artists to contribute "ambitious", "unusual", and "radical" concepts specific to Melbourne that would contribute to the "night-time culture" concept of the festival. Rising's inaugural festival, scheduled to take place in August 2020, was delayed by the COVID-19 pandemic and postponed to 2021.

In March 2021, a rescheduled program was announced for Rising, expected to occur over 26 May to 6 June. The program engaged 800 artists in over 130 events, intended to focus on "site-specific performance and large-scale public art, new collaborations in theatre and dance and novel line-ups in live music". The program included several installations and events in site-specific areas in the Birrarung, Chinatown, Arts District, Midtown and Satellite precincts, with the stated intent of developing "multiple connected experiences" across the city. A headline event for the festival was the installation A Miracle Constantly Repeated by artist Patricia Piccinini, an exhibition that utilised the Flinders Street Station Ballroom and was the first time the space was accessible to the public in 35 years. On 27 May 2021, the Victorian Government announced a public health directive and seven-day statewide lockdown to manage the effects of an abrupt outbreak in the coronavirus pandemic. The organisers immediately cancelled events and issued refunds during the lockdown, although several site installations remained in place for the duration of the festival. Plans to relaunch the festival in its second week in June were abandoned after the lockdown period was extended, leading to a cancellation of the remainder of the program.

=== Inaugural and later festivals ===
The first complete Rising festival was held from 1–12 June 2022 after announcement in March of that year. The program involved over 80 projects and 225 events involving 685 Australian artists. Around 40 per cent of the events announced for the 2021 festival were incorporated into the program for 2022, with the remainder of the previous year's events deferred due to venue and artist availability.

== Events ==
Rising festivals include a mixture of music, performing arts, dance, and art in their programming. The festival has been noted for including a focus on site-specific installations and performances that transform the precincts of inner-city Melbourne and experimental works that are "immersive or ephemeral" in nature.

Year	Dates	Program	Notes	Source
2021	26–27 May	Installations included A Miracle Constantly Repeated by Patricia Piccinini, Ancestral Memory by Maree Clarke and Mitch Mahoney, The Rivers Sing by Deborah Cheetham Fraillon, Byron J Scullin and Thomas Supple, and Wandering Stars by The Lantern Company.	Prematurely cancelled on May 27.	
2022	1–12 June	Musicians included Ana Roxanne, Arab Strap, Andy Shauf, Baxter Dury, Boris, Buffalo Daughter, CHAI, Ed Kuepper, Harvey Sutherland, Jim White, Kelly Lee Owens, Lawrence English, Lucy Dacus, Midori Takada, Marisa Anderson, Masego, Moses Sumney, Sampa the Great, Shabazz Palaces, Teeks, The Goon Sax, Tkay Maidza, Vanessa Tomlinson, Xylouris White and Yussef Dayes.		
2023	7–18 June	Musicians included Birdz, Cornelius,Debby Friday, Ethel Cain, Iceage, Ichiko Aoba, Loraine James, Madlib, Mim Suleiman, Obongjayar, Paul Kelly, Real Lies, Robyn Archer, Ruth Radelet, RVG, Shintaro Sakamoto, The Damned, Thundercat, Weyes Blood and Witch.		
2024	1–16 June	Musicians included Asha Puthli, Blonde Redhead, Christeene, Dirty Three, Dorian Wood, Evian Christ, Fever Ray, Good Morning, Jlin, Onefour, Sammy Butcher, Sky Ferreira, Snoh Aalegra, Tinariwen, Tirzah, Yasiin Bey and Yves Tumor.		
2025	4–15 June	Beth Gibbons, Black Star, Cease + Desist, Chapter Music, Chris Abrahams, Japanese Breakfast, Jessica Pratt, Leah Senior, Liquid Architecture, Marlon Williams, Michael Beach, Mick Turner, Mount Kimbie, Ned Collette, Pete & Bas, Soccer Mommy, Suki Waterhouse, Thalia Zedek		

== Reception ==
Rising has received praise for its breadth of programming and involvement of First Nations artists, and also critique towards the festival's overall identity and stated purpose. Kristen Hé of NME commended the 2023 festival for its "extensive [and] diverse roster", describing the festival as having an appeal that elevated it from its counterparts due to the "abundance of ways in which it makes the city come to life", and Karen Gwee similarly highlighted the 2022 festival for its "thoughtful and varied approach to programming" and being "more sprawling and free-floating" than a typical festival, although noting its broad roster and timeframe made the festival occasionally feel "atomised" and incohesive. Jane Howard of ABC noted that the 2022 festival was a "smaller" and "gentler" festival compared to its predecessors, noting that its "unexpected discoveries" and "small interventions" had positively "changed the shape of the city", but described the fesetival as having "missteps" and "teething issues" due to the "underwhelming" nature of some of the installations. Writing for The Conversation, Sarah Austin highlighted the 2023 festival's "significant and thrilling work" by First Nations artists, but believed the festival had "yet to establish what kind of intervention it is making in our cultural conversation".

Some critics were less positive in their assessment of the festival's impact. Describing the festival as facing an "identity crisis", Cameron Woodhead of The Age praised the 2023 festival's "extensive live music program" and leading role of First Nations artists, but critiqued the festival, stating "it lacks an articulated purpose", "clashes with established interstate festivals", such as Dark Mofo and Vivid Sydney, and was yet to reconcile the "conflicting missions" of predecessors White Night and the Melbourne Festival. First expecting that the festival may be a "refreshing change" to the "bare" arts calendar caused by the pandemic and end of previous festivals, Karen van Ulzen of Dance Australia later considered the 2022 festival to be a "disappointment" and "need a rethink" due to its contrast with the events and tone of White Night and Melbourne Festival, unclear name and branding as an arts festival, and poor weather in part due to the winter timing.

The 2024 festival received more positive coverage, including from past detractors, acknowledging the event had landed a tight and cohesive program. The Age praised the 2024 program, saying Naarm/Melbourne's biggest arts festival had "finally, five years in, achieved lift-off". The Australian called the festival a "winner", with critic Tim Douglas writing: "With Mofo having gone quiet across Bass Strait, Melbourne has taken the midwinter mantel and run with it. With Orbazanek and Fox in their element... RISING is – as its name suggests – a festival in the ascendant."

== Awards and nominations ==
=== Music Victoria Awards ===
The Music Victoria Awards are an annual awards night celebrating Victorian music. They commenced in 2006.

Year	Nominee / work	Award	Result	Ref.
2022	Rising	Best Metro Festival	Nominated	
2023	Rising	Best Metro Festival	Won	
