= Australian Jazz Bell Awards =

- Awarded for: To recognise the talent and achievements of Australian jazz artists locally and internationally
- Country: Australia
- Presented by: Melbourne International Jazz Festival; The Australian Jazz Awards Limited
- First award: 2003
- Final award: 2021

Australian Jazz Bell Awards, also known as the Bell Awards or The Bells, are annual music awards for the jazz genre in Australia. They were named in honour of Australian jazz pianist, composer and band leader, Graeme Bell (1914–2012), at their inception in 2003 at the Melbourne International Jazz Festival.

The awards were announced by Bell and Victoria's Minister for the Arts, Mary Delahunty, on 5 June 2003 to recognise the talent and achievements of Australian jazz artists locally and internationally. They were the inspiration of festival chairman, Albert Dadon, and its artistic director, Adrian Jackson. The latter explained, "The Bells will put the spotlight on the Australian jazz industry that it has never enjoyed before. These new industry gongs will recognise the achievement of excellence by many artists, record companies and venues, and will encourage others to match those achievements."

In 2008, the Australian Jazz Awards Limited, a not-for-profit organisation with its own independent board, was established to present the awards, which thereby became separate from the Melbourne International Jazz Festival committee. The number of awards has varied with six to nine categories being provided each year. The awards were not presented in 2005 or 2020.

== Awards ==
=== 2003 Bell Awards ===
The inaugural Australian Jazz Awards were presented at Melbourne's Grand Hyatt Hotel during the Melbourne International Jazz Festival on 28 August 2003, honouring artists in nine categories.

Year	Nominee / work	Award	Result
2003	Sandy Evans	Australian Jazz Artist of the Year	Won
2003	Australian Art Orchestra	Australian Jazz Ensemble of the Year	Won
2003	Bennetts Lane Big Band	Australian Jazz Venue of the Year	Won
2003	Collected Works – Allan Browne	Best Australian Classic Jazz Album	Won
2003	Mikrokosmos – Andrea Keller	Best Australian Contemporary Jazz Album	Won
2003	Making Wings – Judy Jacques	Best Australian Jazz Vocal Album	Won
2003	The Soul of Things – Tomasz Stanko	International Jazz Album of the Year	Won
2003	Aron Ottignon	Young Australian Jazz Artist of the Year	Won
2003	Ade Monsbourgh	Graeme Bell Hall of Fame	Inductee

=== 2004 Bell Awards ===
On 10 August 2004 a new artistic director of the Melbourne International Jazz festival, Carlo Pagnotta, formerly director of Italy's Umbria Jazz Festival, announced the 27 nominees of the second Bell Awards, honouring artists in nine categories. The winners were awarded on 25 August in Melbourne.

Year	Nominee / work	Award	Result
2004	Phil Slater	Australian Jazz Artist of the Year	Won
2004	Paul Grabowsky	Australian Jazz Artist of the Year	Nominated
2004	Jamie Oehlers	Australian Jazz Artist of the Year	Nominated
2004	The Necks	Australian Jazz Ensemble of the Year	Won
2004	Alister Spence Trio	Australian Jazz Ensemble of the Year	Nominated
2004	Julien Wilson Trio	Australian Jazz Ensemble of the Year	Nominated
2004	Bennetts Lane Big Band	Australian Jazz Venue of the Year	Won
2004	Side-On Cafe	Australian Jazz Venue of the Year	Nominated
2004	Hyde Park Hotel	Australian Jazz Venue of the Year	Nominated
2004	Bob Barnard's Jazz Party – Bob Barnard	Best Australian Classic Jazz Album	Won
2004	Catfish Row – Moovin' & Groovin' Orchestra	Best Australian Classic Jazz Album	Nominated
2004	Now You Are Talking My Language – Society Syncopators	Best Australian Classic Jazz Album	Nominated
2004	Big Small Band Live – Mike Nock	Best Australian Contemporary Jazz Album	Won
2004	Tales of Time and Space – Paul Grabowsky	Best Australian Contemporary Jazz Album	Nominated
2004	Strobe Coma Virgo – Phil Slater	Best Australian Contemporary Jazz Album	Nominated
2004	The Secret – Alison Wedding	Best Australian Jazz Vocal Album	Won
2004	Gold – Vince Jones	Best Australian Jazz Vocal Album	Nominated
2004	The Crying Game – Michelle Nicolle	Best Australian Jazz Vocal Album	Nominated
2004	Suspended Night – Tomasz Stanko Quartet	International Jazz Album of the Year	Won
2004	Up for It – Keith Jarrett	International Jazz Album of the Year	Nominated
2004	I'm All For You – Joe Lovano	International Jazz Album of the Year	Nominated
2004	Felix Bloxsom	Young Australian Jazz Artist of the Year	Won
2004	Aaron Choulai	Young Australian Jazz Artist of the Year	Nominated
2004	Mat Jodrell	Young Australian Jazz Artist of the Year	Nominated
2004	Allan Browne	Graeme Bell Hall of Fame	Inductee
2004	Don Burrows	Graeme Bell Hall of Fame	Nominated
2004	John Pochée	Graeme Bell Hall of Fame	Nominated

=== 2006 Bell Awards ===
In 2006 Albert Dadon took over the role of artistic director of the Melbourne International Jazz festival, following differences with Pagnotta over the festival's direction two years earlier. Dadon was chairman of the Australian Jazz Bell Awards, for their third ceremony honouring artists in nine categories.

Year	Nominee / work	Award	Result
2006	Paul Grabowsky	Australian Jazz Artist of the Year	Won
2006	The Necks	Australian Jazz Ensemble of the Year	Won
2006	Bennetts Lane Big Band	Australian Jazz Venue of the Year	Won
2006	Live at Umbria Jazz '05 – Joe Chindamo	Best Australian Classic Jazz Album	Won
2006	The Assemblers – Jamie Oehlers	Best Australian Contemporary Jazz Album	Won
2006	Moon of Manakoora – Janet Seidel	Best Australian Jazz Vocal Album	Won
2006	The Ground – Tord Gustavsen Trio	International Jazz Album of the Year	Won
2006	Aaron Choulai	Young Australian Jazz Artist of the Year	Won
2006	John Pochée	Graeme Bell Hall of Fame	Inductee

=== 2007 Bell Awards ===
In 2007 Albert Dadon continued as artistic director of the Melbourne International Jazz festival and as chairman of the fourth Australian Jazz Bell Awards, honouring artists in seven categories.

Year	Nominee / work	Award	Result
2007	Jamie Oehlers	Australian Jazz Artist of the Year	Won
2007	"Five Bells" – Paul Grabowsky	Australian Jazz Composition of the Year	Won
2007	Five Bells and Other Inspirations – Allan Browne's Australian Jazz Band	Best Australian Classic Jazz Album	Won
2007	You R Here - Session 2 – Jamie Oehlers Double Drummer Group	Best Australian Contemporary Jazz Album	Won
2007	Grace – Lisa Young	Best Australian Jazz Vocal Album	Won
2007	Shannon Barnett	Young Australian Jazz Artist of the Year	Won
2007	Don Burrows	Graeme Bell Hall of Fame	Inductee

=== 2008 Bell Awards ===
On 29 April 2008 the Australian Jazz Awards Limited presented the fifth Australian Jazz Bell Awards, with Deputy Prime Minister of Australia, Julia Gillard attending. The awards were separated from the Melbourne Jazz Festival in 2008 with a new company The Australian Jazz Awards Limited formed as a not-for-profit organisation with its own independent board, to run the ceremony. They honoured artists in eight categories.

Year	Nominee / work	Award	Result
2008	Julien Wilson	Australian Jazz Artist of the Year	Won
2008	The Fool Poets Portion – Eugene Ball	Australian Jazz Composition of the Year	Won
2008	14 Little Creatures – Stephen Magnusson	Australian Jazz Composition of the Year	Nominated
2008	The Thousands – Phil Slater	Australian Jazz Composition of the Year	Nominated
2008	Cuttin' Capers – Sweet Lowdowns	Best Australian Classic Jazz Album	Won
2008	The Misty Downs Session – Howler's Cotton Club	Best Australian Classic Jazz Album	Nominated
2008	In-Sync – The Syncopators	Best Australian Classic Jazz Album	Nominated
2008	Little Claps – Andrea Keller Quartet	Best Australian Contemporary Jazz Album	Won
2008	The Drunken Boat – Allan Browne Quintet	Best Australian Contemporary Jazz Album	Nominated
2008	The Thousands – Phil Slater	Best Australian Contemporary Jazz Album	Nominated
2008	Phil Slater Quartet	Best Australian Jazz Ensemble	Won
2008	Allan Browne Quintet	Best Australian Jazz Ensemble	Nominated
2008	Julien Wilson Trio	Best Australian Jazz Ensemble	Nominated
2008	Nightlight – Megan Washington	Best Australian Jazz Vocal Album	Won
2008	Elana Stone – Elana Stone	Best Australian Jazz Vocal Album	Nominated
2008	Cuttin' Capers – Sweet Lowdowns	Best Australian Jazz Vocal Album	Nominated
2008	Sam Anning	Young Australian Jazz Artist of the Year	Won
2008	Bernie McGann	Graeme Bell Hall of Fame	Inductee

=== 2009 Bell Awards ===
On 23 April 2009 the Australian Jazz Awards Limited presented the sixth Australian Jazz Bell Awards, with Gillard attending. They honoured artists in seven categories.

Year	Nominee / work	Award	Result
2009	Live at the Famous Spiegeltent – The Syncopators	Best Australian Classic Jazz Album	Won
2009	Lost and Found – Oehlers, Grabowsky, Beck	Best Australian Contemporary Jazz Album	Won
2009	Old Grooves for New Streets – Way Out West	Best Australian Jazz Ensemble	Won
2009	"Till Death Does Me Part" – Johannes Luebbers	Best Australian Jazz Song	Won
2009	Work Songs – Tina Harrod	Best Australian Jazz Vocal Album	Won
2009	Jeremy Rose	Young Australian Jazz Artist of the Year	Won
2009	Mike Nock	Graeme Bell Hall of Fame	Inductee

=== 2010 Bell Awards ===
On 15 April 2010 the seventh Australian Jazz Bell Awards were presented, which honoured artists in seven categories.

Year	Nominee / work	Award	Result
2010	The Gathering – Stu Hunter	Best Australian Contemporary Jazz Album	Won
2010	Homage – Sam Anning, Allan Browne, Marc Hannaford	Best Australian Classic Jazz Album	Won
2010	Epic – Jonathan Zwartz	Best Australian Jazz Ensemble	Won
2010	"The Sea" – Jonathan Zwartz	Best Australian Jazz Song	Won
2010	If You Were There – Kristin Berardi	Best Australian Jazz Vocal Album	Won
2010	Linda Oh	Young Australian Jazz Artist of the Year	Won
2010	Bob Barnard	Graeme Bell Hall of Fame	Inductee

=== 2011 Bell Awards ===
On 5 May 2011 the eighth Australian Jazz Bell Awards were presented, which honoured artists in eight categories.

Year	Nominee / work	Award	Result
2011	The New Sheiks – Leigh Barker	Best Australian Traditional Jazz Album	Won
2011	An Accumulation of Subtleties – Mike Nock Trio	Best Australian Contemporary Jazz Album	Won
2011	The Subterraneans – The Subterraneans	Best Australian Jazz Blend Album	Won
2011	Australian Art Orchestra/Young Wagilak Group	Best Australian Jazz Ensemble	Won
2011	Song from the Highest Tower – Eugene Ball	Best Australian Jazz Song	Won
2011	Elly Hoyt – Elly Hoyt	Best Australian Jazz Vocal Album	Won
2011	Johannes Luebbers	Young Australian Jazz Artist of the Year	Won
2011	Tony Gould	Graeme Bell Hall of Fame	Inductee

=== 2012 Bell Awards ===
On 3 May 2012 the ninth Australian Jazz Bell Awards were presented, which honoured artists in eight categories.

Year	Nominee / work	Award	Result
2012	Collected Works Volume II: Fifty Years of New Orleans Jazz – Alan Browne	Best Australian Traditional Jazz Album	Won
2012	1234 – Nick Haywood Quartet	Best Australian Contemporary Jazz Album	Won
2012	Fish Boast of Fishing – Peter Knight	Most Original Australian Jazz Album	Won
2012	Andrea Keller Quartet	Best Australian Jazz Ensemble	Won
2012	"Spir" – Luke Howard & Janos Bruneel	Best Australian Jazz Song	Won
2012	Kristin Berardi Meets the Jazzgroove Mothership Orchestra – Kristin Berardi Meets Jazzgroove Mothership Orchestra	Best Australian Jazz Vocal Album	Won
2012	Alex Boneham	Young Australian Jazz Artist of the Year	Won
2012	Brian Brown	Graeme Bell Hall of Fame	Inductee

=== 2013 Bell Awards ===
On 2 May 2013 the tenth Australian Jazz Bell Awards were presented by Jazz Artist and Chairman Albert Dadon AM and with Tracey Curro as MC at Melbourne's Regent Theatre, which honoured artists in eight categories.

Year	Nominee / work	Award	Result
2013	A Great Day for the Race – Flap!	Best Australian Traditional Jazz Album	Won
2013	Magnet – MAGNET	Best Australian Contemporary Jazz Album	Won
2013	Sarcophile – Marc Hannaford	Most Original Australian Jazz Album	Won
2013	David Ades & Friends	Best Australian Jazz Ensemble	Won
2013	"Joe the Kid" – David Ades & Friends	Best Australian Jazz Song	Won
2013	The Song That Sings You Here – Chris McNulty	Best Australian Jazz Vocal Album	Won
2013	Steve Barry	Young Australian Jazz Artist of the Year	Won
2013	James Morrison	Graeme Bell Hall of Fame	Inductee

=== 2014 Bell Awards ===
On 1 May 2014 the 11th Australian Jazz Bell Awards were presented by jazz artist and Australian Jazz Awards Limited chairman, Albert Dadon, with Tracey Curro as MC at Melbourne's Plaza Ballroom. They honoured artists in eight categories.

Year	Nominee / work	Award	Result
2014	This Is Always – Julien Wilson Quartet	Best Australian Traditional Jazz Album	Won
2014	Monash Art Ensemble – Monash Art Ensemble	Best Australian Contemporary Avant-garde Jazz Album	Won
2014	Wave Rider – Andrea Keller Quartet	Best Australian Modern Jazz Album	Won
2014	This Is Always – Julien Wilson Quartet	Best Australian Jazz Ensemble	Won
2014	"Trout River" – Julien Wilson	Best Australian Jazz Song	Won
2014	Rise and Fall – Allira Wilson	Best Australian Jazz Vocal Album	Won
2014	Monash Art Ensemble – Joseph O'Connor	Young Australian Jazz Artist of the Year	Won
2014	Judy Bailey	Graeme Bell Hall of Fame	Inductee

=== 2015 Bell Awards ===
On 30 April 2015 the 12th Australian Jazz Bell Awards were presented and hosted by Helen Kapalos at Melbourne's Regent Theatre. Nominees were announced on 20 April. The ceremony honoured artists in eight categories.

Year	Nominee / work	Award	Result
2015	A-Z of Jazz – James Morrison	Best Australian Traditional Jazz Album	Won
2015	The Hunters & Pointers – The Hunters & Pointers	Best Australian Traditional Jazz Album	Nominated
2015	Clarence Williams Tribute – Geoff Bull	Best Australian Traditional Jazz Album	Nominated
2015	Hexis – Monash Art Ensemble, George Lewis	Best Australian Contemporary Avant-garde Jazz Album	Won
2015	Don't Feed – Trio Feral, Barney McAll	Best Australian Contemporary Avant-garde Jazz Album	Nominated
2015	My Cuban Soul – Paul van Ross	Best Australian Contemporary Avant-garde Jazz Album	Nominated
2015	Su Su Nje – Daniel Susnjar	Best Australian Modern Jazz Album	Won
2015	The Bitter Suite – Paul Grabowsky	Best Australian Modern Jazz Album	Nominated
2015	The Last Sanctuary – James Mustafa Orchestra	Best Australian Modern Jazz Album	Nominated
2015	Suite Sima – Mike Nock Octet	Best Australian Jazz Ensemble	Won
2015	Su Su Nje – Daniel Susnjar	Best Australian Jazz Ensemble	Nominated
2015	Return Journey – Daryl McKenzie Orchestra	Best Australian Jazz Ensemble	Nominated
2015	"Forte Pulse Torte" – Daniel Susnjar	Best Australian Jazz Song	Won
2015	"Black Saffron" – Paul Grabowsky	Best Australian Jazz Song	Nominated
2015	"Some Kind of Dream" – Penelope Sai	Best Australian Jazz Song	Nominated
2015	We Could Be Lovers – Sarah McKenzie	Best Australian Jazz Vocal Album	Won
2015	Songs of Friends – Josh Kyle & Sam Keevers	Best Australian Jazz Vocal Album	Nominated
2015	Aspirations – Tom Barton	Best Australian Jazz Vocal Album	Nominated
2015	The Last Sanctuary – James Mustafa Orchestra	Young Australian Jazz Artist of the Year	Won
2015	Inverno – Nic Vardenga	Young Australian Jazz Artist of the Year	Nominated
2015	Not Alone – Jessica Carlton	Young Australian Jazz Artist of the Year	Nominated
2015	Graeme Lyall	Graeme Bell Hall of Fame	Inductee

=== 2016 Bell Awards ===
On 20 June 2016 the 13th Australian Jazz Bell Awards were presented at Bird's Basement, Melbourne. Nominees were announced on 12 May. The ceremony honoured artists in eight categories.

Year	Nominee / work	Award	Result
2016	Mooroolbark – Barney McAll	Best Australian Instrumental Jazz Album	Won
2016	Lady Luck – Angela Davis	Best Australian Instrumental Jazz Album	Nominated
2016	This Narrow Isthmus – Julien Wilson Quartet	Best Australian Instrumental Jazz Album	Nominated
2016	Ithaca Bound – Allan Browne Quintet	Best Australian Small Jazz Band	Won
2016	Mooroolbark – Barney McAll & Australian Symbiotic Improvisers Orbit	Best Australian Small Jazz Band	Nominated
2016	Alister Spence Trio: Live – Alister Spence Trio	Best Australian Small Jazz Band	Nominated
2016	Beginning and End of Knowing – Mike Nock / Laurence Pike	Best Produced Album	Won
2016	Mooroolbark – Barney McAll	Best Produced Album	Nominated
2016	Lady Luck – Angela Davis	Best Produced Album	Nominated
2016	2015 Live Performance Compilation – Jazzgroove Mothership Orchestra	Best Australian Jazz Ensemble	Won
2016	The Daniel Susnjar Afro-Peruvian Jazz Group – Daniel Susnjar	Best Australian Jazz Ensemble	Nominated
2016	Music for Average Photography – Mace Francis Orchestra	Best Australian Jazz Ensemble	Nominated
2016	"Nectar Spur" – Barney McAll	Best Australian Jazz Song	Won
2016	"Weeping Willow" – Julien Wilson Quartet	Best Australian Jazz Song	Nominated
2016	"A Thousand Feet from Bergen Street" – Angela Davis	Best Australian Jazz Song	Nominated
2016	Where or When – Kristin Berardi	Best Australian Jazz Vocal Album	Won
2016	Provenance – Vince Jones & Paul Grabowsky	Best Australian Jazz Vocal Album	Nominated
2016	Keep an Eye on Spring – Olivia Chindamo	Best Australian Jazz Vocal Album	Nominated
2016	Keep an Eye on Spring – Olivia Chindamo	Young Australian Jazz Artist of the Year	Won
2016	Counter Clockwork – James McLean	Young Australian Jazz Artist of the Year	Nominated
2016	Manticore – Niran Dasika	Young Australian Jazz Artist of the Year	Nominated
2016	Joe Chindamo	Graeme Bell Hall of Fame	Inductee

=== 2017 Bell Awards ===
On 15 May 2017 the 14th Australian Jazz Bell Awards were presented at Bird's Basement, Melbourne. Nominees were announced on 27 April. The ceremony honoured artists in seven categories.

Year	Nominee / work	Award	Result
2017	Consider This – Andrea Keller and Tim Wilson Duo	Best Australian Instrumental Jazz Album	Won
2017	Iron in the Blood – Jeremy Rose and the Earshift Orchestra	Best Australian Instrumental Jazz Album	Nominated
2017	Stu Hunter	Best Australian Instrumental Jazz Album	Nominated
2017	Iron in the Blood – Jeremy Rose and the Earshift Orchestra	Best Produced Album	Won
2017	Consider This – Andrea Keller and Tim Wilson Duo	Best Produced Album	Nominated
2017	The Migration – Stu Hunter	Best Produced Album	Nominated
2017	The Migration – Stu Hunter	Best Australian Jazz Ensemble	Won
2017	A Flower is a Lovesome Thing – Michelle Nicolle Quartet	Best Australian Jazz Ensemble	Nominated
2017	The Vampires	Best Australian Jazz Ensemble	Nominated
2017	"Eagle Fish" – Stu Hunter	Best Australian Jazz Song	Won
2017	Andrea Keller and Tim Wilson Duo	Best Australian Jazz Song	Nominated
2017	Eugene Ball 4tet	Best Australian Jazz Song	Nominated
2017	A Flower is a Lovesome Thing – Michelle Nicolle Quartet	Best Australian Jazz Vocal Album	Won
2017	Kristin Bernardi	Best Australian Jazz Vocal Album	Nominated
2017	The Migration – Stu Hunter	Best Australian Jazz Vocal Album	Nominated
2017	Harry Mitchell	Young Australian Jazz Artist of the Year	Won
2017	Ted Vining	Graeme Bell Hall of Fame	Inductee

=== 2018 Bell Awards ===
The 15th Australian Jazz Bell Awards were presented on 14 May 2018, which honoured artists in seven categories. Nominees were announced on 8 May.

Year	Nominee / work	Award	Result
2018	Still Night: Music in Poetry – Andrea Keller	Best Australian Jazz Vocal Album	Won
2018	I'm Glad There is You – Kristin Berardi	Best Australian Jazz Vocal Album	Nominated
2018	Solace – Kayleigh Pincott	Best Australian Jazz Vocal Album	Nominated
2018	Hearing the Blood – Barney McAll	Best Australian Instrumental Jazz Album	Won
2018	We Have Moved – Speedball	Best Australian Instrumental Jazz Album	Nominated
2018	Skylines – Evan Harris	Best Australian Instrumental Jazz Album	Nominated
2018	Hearing the Blood – Barney McAll	Best Produced Album	Won
2018	We Have Moved – Speedball	Best Produced Album	Nominated
2018	Skylines – Evan Harris	Best Produced Album	Nominated
2018	Hearing the Blood – Barney McAll	Best Australian Jazz Ensemble of the Year	Won
2018	Daniel Susnjar Afro-Peruvian Jazz Group	Best Australian Jazz Ensemble of the Year	Nominated
2018	I Hold the Lions Paw	Best Australian Jazz Ensemble of the Year	Nominated
2018	"Judgement Day" – Speedball	Best Australian Jazz Song of the Year	Won
2018	"Love Is the Blood" – Barney McAll	Best Australian Jazz Song of the Year	Nominated
2018	"Empathy" – Kayleigh Pincott	Best Australian Jazz Song of the Year	Nominated
2018	Skylines – Evan Harris	Young Australian Jazz Artist of the Year	Won
2018	Jack Earle Trio	Young Australian Jazz Artist of the Year	Nominated
2018	Milton Man Gogh	Young Australian Jazz Artist of the Year	Nominated
2018	Bob Sedergreen	Graeme Bell Hall of Fame	Inductee

=== 2019 Bell Awards ===
The 16th Australian Jazz Bell Awards were presented on 24 September 2019, which honoured artists in seven categories.

Year	Nominee / work	Award	Result
2019	Trombone Song Cycle – Josh Kyle	Best Australian Jazz Vocal Album	Won
2019	Archie – Harriett Allcroft	Best Australian Jazz Vocal Album	Nominated
2019	Old Digger's Picnic – Margie Lou Dyer	Best Australian Jazz Vocal Album	Nominated
2019	Across a Field as Vast as One – Sam Anning	Best Australian Instrumental Jazz Album	Won
2019	Echoes of Harlem – Matt Jodrell	Best Australian Instrumental Jazz Album	Nominated
2019	Zephyrix – Barney McAll (featuring Monash Art Ensemble)	Best Australian Instrumental Jazz Album	Nominated
2019	Zephyrix - Barney McAll	Best Produced Album	Won
2019	Across a Field as Vast as One – Sam Anning	Best Produced Album	Nominated
2019	Echoes of Harlem – Matt Jodrell	Best Produced Album	Nominated
2019	Five Below Live - Andrea Keller	Best Australian Jazz Ensemble of the Year	Won
2019	Animarum - Jonathan Zwartz	Best Australian Jazz Ensemble of the Year	Nominated
2019	Across a Field as Vast as One – Sam Anning	Best Australian Jazz Ensemble of the Year	Nominated
2019	Suzaku – Niran Dasika	Young Australian Jazz Artist of the Year	Won
2019	Erica – Flora Carbo	Young Australian Jazz Artist of the Year	Nominated
2019	To the Bone – Josh Bennier	Young Australian Jazz Artist of the Year	Nominated
2019	"Animarum" (from Animarum) - Jonathan Zwartz	Best Jazz Work of the Year	Won
2019	"For My Folks" (from Echoes of Harlem) – Mat Jodrell	Best Jazz Work of the Year	Nominated
2019	"Sweethearts" (from Across a Field as Vast as One) – Sam Anning	Best Jazz Work of the Year	Nominated
2019	Sandy Evans	Graeme Bell Hall of Fame	Inductee
2019	Bryce Rohde	Graeme Bell Hall of Fame	Inductee
2019	Horst Liepolt	Graeme Bell Hall of Fame	Inductee
2019	Allan Zavod	Graeme Bell Hall of Fame	Inductee

=== 2021 Bell Awards ===
The 17th Australian Jazz Bell Awards were presented, which honoured artists in seven categories.

Year	Nominee / work	Award	Result
2021	Our Songs, Not Songs – Kristin Berardi and Sam Anning	Best Australian Jazz Vocal Album	Won
2021	I Am Like the Rain – Allira Wilson, Harry Mitchell, Ben Vanderwal, Karl Florisson	Best Australian Jazz Vocal Album	Nominated
2021	The Composers' Voice: Celebrating Australian Women Composers – Elly Hoyt	Best Australian Jazz Vocal Album	Nominated
2021	The Dark Pattern – Phil Slater	Best Australian Instrumental Jazz Album	Won
2021	This World – This World (Mike Nock, Hamish Stuart, Julien Wilson, Jonathan Zwartz)	Best Australian Instrumental Jazz Album	Nominated
2021	Forever More – Nat Bartsch	Best Australian Instrumental Jazz Album	Nominated
2021	The Shape of Jazz - ZedSix	Best Produced Album	Won
2021	Love Is a Temporary Madness – Vanessa Perica Orchestra	Best Produced Album	Nominated
2021	This World – This World (Mike Nock, Hamish Stuart, Julien Wilson, Jonathan Zwartz)	Best Produced Album	Nominated
2021	This World - Mike Nock, Hamish Stuart, Julien Wilson, Jonathan Zwartz	Best Australian Jazz Ensemble of the Year	Won
2021	The Street in Canberra – Spirograph Studies	Best Australian Jazz Ensemble of the Year	Nominated
2021	These Digital Times – Andrea Keller's Five Below	Best Australian Jazz Ensemble of the Year	Nominated
2021	Stephen Byth	Young Australian Jazz Artist of the Year	Won
2021	Flora Carbo	Young Australian Jazz Artist of the Year	Nominated
2021	Sophie Min	Young Australian Jazz Artist of the Year	Nominated
2021	"Spaccanapoli" (from Love Is a Temporary Madness) - Vanessa Perica	Best Jazz Work of the Year	Won
2021	"And in the Night Comes Rain" – Jonathan Zwartz (This World)	Best Jazz Work of the Year	Nominated
2021	Tamara Murphy (Spirograph Studies): "Gospel"	Best Jazz Work of the Year	Nominated
2021	Paul Grabowsky	Graeme Bell Hall of Fame	Inductee
2021	Mark Simmonds	Graeme Bell Hall of Fame	Inductee
2021	Nick Polites	Graeme Bell Hall of Fame	Inductee
2021	Bruce Clarke	Graeme Bell Hall of Fame	Inductee

== See also ==
- Melbourne International Jazz Festival
- Australian jazz
