= Mooroolbark (album) =

2015 album by Barney McAll

Studio album by Barney McAll
- Released: 5 May 2015
- Recorded: Sydney 17 & 18 June 2014
- Studio: ABC Studios (Australia)
- Genre: Jazz; contemporary jazz; gospel; afro-Caribbean
- Length: 60:01
- Label: ABC Classics
- Producer: Produced by Barney McAll

Barney McAll chronology
Solo Piano Live (2013)	Mooroolbark (2015)	Nourriture De L'Amour (2015)

Mooroolbark is an album by Australian jazz pianist and composer Barney McAll, released on the ABC Classics Label in May 2015. Other than the composition: "Apple Tree," which has a live and studio version on the album and "Sparkler," all the tracks were recorded in ABC Studios (Australia), with additions made in Tokyo by Shannon Barnett and Brooklyn by Mino Cinelu. The name of the album, "Mooroolbark" is the Wurundjeri ethnic name for the area where McAll grew up, which McAll says is "why I play music."

== Background ==
After a 17 year long musical journey in New York (since 1989), Mooroolbark was recorded shortly after McAll's return to Australia. ABC Music refers to Mooroolbark as an "evocative series of tales gathered over years of travel and research" which "exhibit diverse colours and influences" surrounding the nucleus of McAll's unique compositional approach. Some of these "tales" may be observed in the Album Note section and the Track Listing section.

== Recording ==
Mooroolbark was recorded on the 17th and 18 June at ABC Studios in 2014. Some of the personnel on the album were not recorded at this time; Shannon Barnett was recorded by Aaron Choulai at Snap and Burn Studios in Tokyo while Mino Cinelu recorded himself in Brooklyn New York. The compositions on the album were all composed by Barney McAll who also produced the project. The album was engineered by Mitch Kenny, and mixed and mastered by Hiroyuki Sanada (Command+Z Studios NYC). The executive producer of this album was Toby Chadd and the Assistant was Andre Shrimski.

== Accolades ==
Mooroolbark was the 2015 winner of the ARIA Award for best jazz album. The album also won the 2015 Australian Independent Record Labels Association award for Best Jazz Album and the 2015 The Age Music Victoria award for Best Jazz Album. At the 2016 Australian Jazz Bell Awards Mooroolbark also received the Best Jazz Album award and won the award for Best Song, "Necar Spur."

== Track listing ==
Track Title	TIME
1. Nectar Spur	7:20
2. February	5:55
3. Coast Road	5:02
4. Jendhi	9:39
5. Non-Compliance	10:28
6. Poverty	5:15
7. Transformations	9:16
8. Apple Tree (Live Version)	7:58
9. Mooroolbark 1974	0:47
10. Apple Tree (Studio Version)	5.53
11. Sparkler (Live)	5:37

According to ABC Music, tracks 10 and 11 are only available on iTunes. The other 9 tracks have been ascribed unique meanings on the official Barney McAll website...

== Personnel ==
- Barney McAll – piano, chucky, vocals track 1
- Julien Wilson – tenor sax, bass clarinet
- Steve Magnusson – guitars
- Jonathan Zwartz – bass
- Simon Barker – drums, percussion
- Mino Cinelu – percussion tracks 1, 2, 4, 5, 7
- Shannon Barnett – trombone tracks 6 & 7
