= Bennetts Lane Jazz Club =

Coordinates: 37°48′32″S 144°58′3″E

The Bennetts Lane Jazz Club was an Australian live jazz performance music venue in Melbourne. The club was established by entrepreneur Michael Tortoni and located at the end of its namesake lane off Little Lonsdale Street from November 1992 to February 2017. New owners planned to reopen the club in new premises in Flinders Lane in the 2020s, but this plan has not come to fruition as of 2023.

Tortoni opened a new jazz club, called The JazzLab (which had been the name of an earlier performance space in the Bennetts Lane Club), in April 2017 in Leslie Street, Brunswick.

== History ==
=== Early days ===
Entrepreneur Michael Tortoni opened the Bennetts Lane Jazz Club on 27 November 1992, located at the end of its namesake lane off Little Lonsdale Street.

A second performance space was added in an adjoining building to the north called The JazzLab in January 2000 for the Melbourne International Jazz Festival. The venue's opening night featured a concert by David Jones' band AtmaSphere.

=== Change of management (2015) ===
The venue closed on 15 June 2015, following the sale of the real estate assets by Tortoni for $10 million to a developer intent on building an apartment complex on the site. Tortoni then sold the intellectual property of the club, including the employment of long-time manager Megan Evans, to entrepreneur David Marriner in June 2015.

Marriner negotiated with the developer to retain the club at its original site until they were ready to begin works. The club reopened 10 weeks after initially closing, on 27 August 2015, with a performance by Yvette Johansson, and an updated interior, air conditioning and sound system. During this time Marriner enlisted Evans' design studio, Brolly Studios, to design the new club at its future location in Flinders Lane, behind the Grand Hyatt, the plans for which were approved in 2016. The studios closed to allow space for the developer to install a display suite, and Flipboard Cafe, also onsite, continued to operate. Due to the club still operating, the opportunity to reconsider the design allowed Marriner and Evans to update their design. The new design was approved by the Melbourne City Council in 2019.

=== Closure (2015) ===
The club finally closed in February 2017. After its closure, David Marriner and his team awaited the go-ahead by the Grand Hyatt land owners to begin construction. As of February 2020 there was no news of construction or projected opening dates. On 13 November 2022, the owners appeared to have made the decision to put their efforts on hold for the time being.

=== New JazzLab ===
Tortoni opened a new jazz club called The JazzLab in April 2017, located in Leslie Street, Brunswick.

== Significance and recognition ==
The club hosted local, national and international musicians and was the flagship venue for the Melbourne Jazz Festival for many years. Lonely Planet called it "The World's Best Jazz Club" and it won the Best Venue Award at the Australian Jazz Awards in 2003 and 2004 (the award being discontinued thereafter).

== Performers ==
Musicians who performed at the club include:

- Allan Browne
- AtmaSphere
- The Cat Empire
- Hayley Clare
- Harry Connick Jr.
- Chick Corea
- Kurt Elling
- Sandy Evans
- Renee Geyer
- Herbie Hancock
- Abdullah Ibrahim
- Andrea Keller
- Branford Marsalis
- Wynton Marsalis
- Brad Mehldau
- The Necks
- Esperanza Spalding
- Justin Timberlake
- Prince
- Bill Evans (saxophonist)
- Joe Chindamo
- Tal Wilkenfeld
- James Muller
- Mark Fitzgibbon

== See also ==
- Culture of Melbourne
- Village Vanguard
