= Phil Slater =

- Genres: Jazz
- Occupation: Musician
- Instrument: Trumpet

Phil Slater is an Australian jazz trumpeter and composer based in the Illawarra region.

Slater has performed and recorded with a wide range of artists including Archie Roach, Missy Higgins, the Australian Art Orchestra, Lou Reed, Jim Black, Jonathan Zwartz, Katie Noonan, Vince Jones, Bernie McGann, Sandy Evans, Paul Grabowsky, Genevieve Lacey, PNAU, Directions In Groove, Nick Littlemore, Andrea Keller, Barney McAll, and Gian Slater. In the 1990s he studied composition with Peter Sculthorpe, Barry Conynham and Andrew Ford at the University of Sydney and University of Wollongong.

During the 1990s and 2000s Slater was a prominent member of the Sydney jazz and improvisation community and led a number of un-recorded projects including The Fresh Kills (with Samuel Dixon, Carl Dewhurst, and Simon Barker), the Very Interactive Band, the Whistle Stop Trio (with Carl Dewhurst and Simon Barker), and the Phil Slater Quartet (with Matt McMahon, Lloyd Swanton and Simon Barker).

Since the early 2000s Slater became the leader or co-leader of a number of award winning projects including Strobe Coma Virgo, Band of Five Names, Daorum, and Trace Sphere. Slater has composed and performed original music for many theatre, film and television productions including Stuff Happens and Exit The King for Belvoir Street Theatre, Mother Courage, Gallipoli, and King Lear with Sydney Theatre Company, the Tale of Samulnori with Legs On The Wall. In 2022, Slater was a featured soloist and guest Principal Trumpet with The Australian Chamber Orchestra.

Slater has been awarded the Australian National Jazz Award, the Bell Award for Australian Jazz Artist of the Year, the Bell Award for Best Australian Contemporary Jazz Ensemble (Phil Slater Quartet), the Limelight Award for Outstanding Contribution to Australian Jazz, and the Freedman Fellowship.

In 2019 he released The Dark Pattern, featuring Simon Barker (drums), Matt McMahon (piano), Matt Keegan (saxophone) and Brett Hirst (bass). The album saw him nominated for the 2019 ARIA Award for Best Jazz Album. Slater's latest recording called Immersion Lure (2023) has been described by jazz critic John Shand as "one of the timeless records of Australian music".

Slater has taught at the Sydney Conservatorium of Music since 1997, and was awarded a PhD in skill acquisition theory in 2020.

== Discography ==
Title	Details
The Thousands	Released: 2007; Label: Kimnara Records (NARA007); Format: CD, digital download
The Dark Pattern	Released: 19 July 2019; Label: Earshift Records (EAR034); Format: 2xCD, digital download
Immersion Lure	Released 2023; Label: Bandcamp; Format: CD, digital download

And featured on

- Band of Five Names by Band of Five Names (1999)
- Severence by Band of Five Names (2002)
- Empty Gardens by Band of Five Names (2006)
- Daorum by Daorum (2008) - Kimnara

== Awards and nominations ==
=== AIR Awards ===
The Australian Independent Record Awards (commonly known informally as AIR Awards) is an annual awards night to recognise, promote and celebrate the success of Australia's Independent Music sector.

Year	Nominee / work	Award	Result
2020	The Dark Pattern	Best Independent Jazz Album or EP	Nominated

=== ARIA Music Awards ===
The ARIA Music Awards is an annual awards ceremony that recognises excellence, innovation, and achievement across all genres of Australian music.

Year	Nominee / work	Award	Result	Ref.
2019	The Dark Pattern	Best Jazz Album	Nominated	

=== Australian Jazz Bell Awards ===
The Australian Jazz Bell Awards, (also known as the Bell Awards or The Bells), are annual music awards for the jazz music genre in Australia. They commenced in 2003.

Year	Nominee / work	Award	Result
2004	Phil Slater	Australian Jazz Artist of the Year	Won
2008	Phil Slater Quartet	Best Australian Jazz Ensemble	Won

- wins only
