= Eugene Ball =

Australian jazz trumpeter

- Born: 12 October 1972 (age 54)
- Genre: Jazz
- Occupations: Musician, composer
- Instrument: Trumpet
- Website: eugeneball.com

Eugene Ball (born 12 October 1972) is an Australian jazz trumpeter. He won the Best Australian Jazz Composition Award for "Fool Poet's Portion" at the Australian Jazz Bell Awards in 2008.

Fool Poet's Portion is inspired by Norse mythology with three movements: The Death of Baldr, Trickster's Intent, and The Coming of Christianity. It is performed by the Bennetts Lane Big Band which was assembled by Ball, Andrea Keller, and Nick Haywood in 2001 as a large ensemble and as a vehicle for original new work. The work was re-orchestrated and performed at a benefit concert for the Melbourne Jazz Co-op in January 2008.

Ball was awarded second place in the Wangaratta Festival of Jazz Awards in 2003, and was a finalist in the prestigious Freedman Jazz Fellowship in 2003 and 2006.

In 2004 Ball and guitarist Stephen Magnusson started Lebowski's, a series of musician-run concerts in venues not associated with jazz. The following year, 2005, Eugene Ball was an important initiator of the Melbourne Jazz Fringe Festival.

Ball was awarded a Melbourne Research Scholarship at the completion of his master's degree in Performance and Composition from Melbourne University.

He has performed with Paul Grabowsky, Mike Nock, Tony Gould, Graeme Lyall, Don Burrows, Jamie Cullum, and John Butler; and with groups The Hoodangers, the Andrea Keller Quartet, the Allan Browne Quintet, the Australian Art Orchestra, and the Ball/Magnusson/Talia trio. He is involved in several musical projects including Kadoonka, ish ish, Aaron Choulai Quintet, and the Messiaen Project performing works by Olivier Messiaen.

He teaches trumpet, improvisation, and composition and has directed ensembles at Eltham High School, Monash University, and Victorian College of the Arts. He is a lecturer in music for Melbourne Polytechnic's Bachelor Music program at the Fairfield campus.

== Awards ==
=== Australian Jazz Bell Awards ===
The Australian Jazz Bell Awards, (also known as the Bell Awards or The Bells), are annual music awards for the jazz music genre in Australia. They commenced in 2003.

Year	Nominee / work	Award	Result
2008	"The Fool Poets Portion" – Eugene Ball	Australian Jazz Composition of the Year	Won
2011	"Song from the Highest Tower" – Eugene Ball	Best Australian Jazz Song	Won
2017	"4tet" – Eugene Ball	Best Australian Jazz Song	Nominated
