= Melbourne Jazz Co-operative =

- Genre: jazz
- Dates: 1982
- Location: Melbourne
- Years active: Since 1982
- Founders: Martin Jackson, Jamie Fielding & others
- Website: http://www.mjc.org.au

The Melbourne Jazz Co-operative, better known as the Melbourne Jazz Co-op runs two jazz concerts a week in Melbourne, and is the most active jazz presenter organisation in Australia. The organisation was founded by Martin Jackson, pianist Jamie Fielding, bassist Barry Buckley and others in late 1982 with the intention of presenting as wide a range of jazz styles as on offer in Melbourne at the time. A broad range of jazz styles were encouraged including rock-influenced, bebop, avant-garde to fusion.

The initial series of concerts were held on Sunday afternoons at Royal Melbourne Institute of Technology University's Glasshouse Theatre starting January 1983, with the organisation being funded by the Australia Council for $3,000. Arts Victoria also providing funding from 1987. The organisation was a vital catalyst for the development of Melbourne's contemporary jazz scene providing opportunities for local, interstate and international performers.

Before the 1980s coordination of jazz concerts was particularly lacking. The New South Wales Jazz Co-ordination program helped the establishment of the Sydney Improvised Music Association in Sydney quickly followed by the establishment of the Melbourne Jazz Co-operative in 1982. Both sought and gained Federal Government Arts Council funding soon after establishment. Similar Jazz co-ordination programs were established in other states with Arts Council and State Government Funding.

In January 1993 the Melbourne Jazz Co-op began the weekly Sunday night 'A-Live' Jazz series at the Bennetts Lane Jazz Club. A second weekly series, the 'Transitions' on Tuesday nights started in late 1997. In 2007 a third weekly series, the "Ezz-thetics" on Thursday nights was started at the Paris Cat Jazz Club.

In the late 1980s and 1990s numerous weekend jazz festivals were organised. In 1991 it contributed a contemporary segment to the Montsalvat International Festival of Jazz. The Melbourne Women's Jazz Festival was founded in 1997 and run by the organisation until 2003, when it was handed over to independent Festival Management, while still contributing some events.

In 2008 the 25th anniversary of the organisation was celebrated with a benefit concert which included many performers, including the Bennetts Lane Big Band performing the award-winning jazz composition by Eugene Ball, Fool Poet's Portion suite. Other performers included Guitarists Ren Walters and Steve Magnusson, Saxophonist Jamie Oehlers and pianist Marc Hannaford as a duo, Mark Fitzgibbon solo piano set, performances from trios led by Allan Browne and Rob Burke, and the eight piece Mike Nock project.

Since presenting the Browne-Costello-Grabowsky Trio at its inaugural concert in January 1983, the Melbourne Jazz Co-op has presented hundreds of performances featuring many of Australia's most respected musicians, from Melbourne and interstate, as well as a number of international artists who otherwise may not have performed in Melbourne. In 2009, the Melbourne Jazz Co-op presented 152 performances featuring over 130 ensembles.
