= Smiley Hands =

1996 EP by New Zealand band Breathe

EP by Breathe
- Released: 1996
- Recorded: 1996
- Studio: Marmalade Studios, Wellington
- Length: 12:28
- Label: Felix (through BMG)
- Producer: Tom Larkin

Breathe chronology
Things Like These (1995)	Smiley Hands (1996)	Pop Life (1998)

Smiley Hands is an EP by New Zealand band Breathe, released in 1996.

Their only prior release was the Things Like These EP in 1995.

The Smiley Hands EP was the bands first release for their new record company Felix Records. It peaked at 24 on the New Zealand charts in December 1996. For their first full album and final Felix record Pop Life they rercorded the title track Smiley Hands, before being signed by Sony Music.

The track Smiley Hands was also the first video made by the band and was directed by Jonathan King (film director) who would go on to direct several famous (in New Zealand) films.

== Track listing ==
1. Smiley Hands
2. Waterslide
3. Touchdown
4. Burnt By The Sun

== Performers ==
- Guy Fisher (Drums, Percussion)
- Pet Johnson (Bass Guitar)
- Steve Gallagher (Keyboards, Sampler)
- Richard Small (Guitars, Vocals)
- Andrew Tilby (Vocals)
