= Daryl McKenzie =

Australian composer and trombonist

Daryl McKenzie (born 1962) is an Australian musical director, composer and trombonist.

McKenzie has directed the Daryl McKenzie Jazz Orchestra since 1992 playing with artists such as Bill Watrous, James Morrison (musician), and Wilbur Wilde. He was musical director for the television show Hey Hey It's Saturday (Nine Network) from 1992 to 1999 also returning for the 2010 reunion shows. He has directed the Australian Film Institute Awards for SBS television and episodes of Dancing with the Stars (Australian TV series) and the Good Friday Appeal for the Seven Network and was musical director of Australia's Got Talent Series 1. He has arranged for the television shows Australian Idol, Young Talent Time and Carols by Candlelight.

He has orchestrated and conducted movie scores including The Truman Show, Death Defying Acts, Beneath Hill 60, Hating Alison Ashley, Bootmen and Two Hands plus the Olympic and Commonwealth Games themes for the Seven Network. He has composed music used in the films Love and Other Catastrophes and Summer Coda. He arranged the Collingwood Football Club and St Kilda Football Club theme songs for the Melbourne Symphony Orchestra's performance at the 2010 AFL Grand Final. Artists to use his arrangements include Ray Charles, Randy Crawford, John Farnham, Tom Jones, Joe Cocker, Barry Manilow and B. B. King. He has been musical director for Kate Ceberano, Rhonda Burchmore, Debra Byrne the Victoria Police Showband. Daryl is currently the Program Leader for Contemporary Performance at the Australian Institute of Music in Melbourne, regularly adjudicates at the Melbourne School Bands Festival and has lectured in orchestration and arranging at the Victorian College of the Arts and the Defence Force School of Music (Australia).

== Discography ==
=== Albums ===
Album	Year	Artist	Category
Phenomenon (Hammard)	1987	Young Talent Team	Arranger/Assoc. Producer
"Super Hits 88/89" (Hammard)	1989	New Young Talent Team	Arranger/Assoc. Producer
"The Final Farewell" – (Hammard)	1989	Johnny Young and the Young Talent Teams	Arranger/Assoc. Producer
"Caught in the Act" – (Mushroom) (No.1/Gold record)	1991	Debra Byrne	Arranger
"Leading Lady" – (Columbia)	1991	Marina Prior	Arranger
"Bran Nue Dae" – Cast Album (Polygram)	1993	Cast	Arranger
"Spirit of Christmas"- (Myer/Salvation Army)	1993	Ross Wilson	Arranger/Conductor
"By Request"	1995	RAAF Central Band	Arranger
"Lilian's Story" soundtrack (Columbia/Sony)	1995	Victorian Philharmonic Orchestra	Orchestrator/Conductor
"Love and Other Catastrophes" soundtrack (Polydor)	1996	Daryl McKenzie Jazz Orchestra	Composer/Conductor
"Rhonda Burchmore" – (Shock records)	1997	Rhonda Burchmore	Arranger
"Anthology 3: Rarities" – (RCA Victor)	1997	John Farnham	Arranger
"AGSC 1998 Award Winners" (Sony)	1998	Cezary Skubiszewski	Orchestrator/Conductor
"The sound of one hand clapping" – soundtrack	1998	Victorian Philharmonic Orchestra	Orchestrator/Conductor
"The Truman Show: Music from the Motion Picture" (Milan Records)	1998	Victorian Philharmonic Orchestra	Orchestrator/Conductor
"Two Hands" – soundtrack (Festival)	1999	Victorian Philharmonic Orchestra	Orchestrator/Conductor
"Paperback Hero" – soundtrack (Universal Music)	1999	Victorian Philharmonic Orchestra	Orchestrator/Conductor
"The Wog Boy" soundtrack (Mushroom)	2000	Victorian Philharmonic Orchestra/ Daryl McKenzie Jazz Orchestra	Orchestrator/Conductor/Trombone
"Expressions" (Independent)	2000	Eduard Volcheck	Orchestrator/Conductor
"Don't Stop The Revolution" (Sony NZ)	2000	Breathe	Arranger/Trombone
"Of Someday Shambles" (Big Wheel Recreation)	2000	Jebediah	Orchestrator/Conductor
"Look at Me Now" (Minorke Records)	2002	Roland Bonet	Arranger/Trombone
"La Spagnola" soundtrack	2002	Victorian Philharmonic Orchestra/ Daryl McKenzie Jazz Orchestra	Orchestrator/Conductor
"Present" (Columbia)	2002	Killing Heidi	Orchestrator/Conductor
"Live at the Melbourne Concert Hall" (Shock records)	2003	Rhonda Burchmore	Arranger
"The Rage in Placid Lake" soundtrack (Move records)	2003	Victorian Philharmonic Orchestra	Orchestrator/Conductor
"Black and White" soundtrack (ABC Classics)	2003	Victorian Philharmonic Orchestra	Orchestrator/Conductor
"Boots and All" (Sony)	2003	Peter Brocklehurst	Arranger
"After The Deluge" soundtrack (Move records)	2004	Victorian Philharmonic Orchestra	Orchestrator/Conductor
"Bluebird of Happiness" (Phantom)	2004	Rhys Meirion	Producer/Conductor/Arranger
"Autumn" (ABC Classics)	2004	Victorian Philharmonic Orchestra	Orchestrator/Conductor
"Hating Alison Ashley" Soundtrack (Festval/Mushroom)	2003	Victorian Philharmonic Orchestra	Orchestrator/Conductor
"Songlines" (Sony)	2005	Daryl Somers	Arranger
"The Caterpillar Wish" Soundtrack (Shock records)	2006	Victorian Philharmonic Orchestra	Orchestrator
"The Swing Sessions" (Sony BMG)	2006	David Campbell	Arranger
"Salut!"	2007	Eduard Volcheck	Orchestrator
"A Symphony of Hits" (Columbia)	2008	Human Nature	Arranger
"Watchout... We've Got The Power" (Universal Music)	2008	Burkhard Dallwitz	Orchestrator/Conductor
"It's About Time" (Independent)	2008	Daryl McKenzie Jazz Orchestra	Producer/Composer/Trombone
"Death Defying Acts" Soundtrack (Lakeshore Records) 2008	2008	Victorian Philharmonic Orchestra/Daryl McKenzie Jazz Orchestra	Orchestrator/Conductor/Trombone
"Bran Nue Dae" soundtrack (Sony)	2010	Victorian Philharmonic Orchestra/Daryl McKenzie Jazz Orchestra	Orchestrator/Conductor/Trombone
"With a Little Help From Our Friends"	2010	Victoria Police Showband	Producer/Arranger
"Scallywag" (Independent)	2010	Daryl McKenzie Jazz Orchestra	Producer/Composer/Trombone
"Compass" (Sony)	2010	Mark Vincent	Arranger
"Filmworks" (Albert)	2010	Cezary Skubiszewski	Orchestrator/Conductor
"The Great Tenor Songbook" (Sony)	2010	Mark Vincent	Arranger
"The Spirit of Christmas" (Myer)	2010	Mark Vincent	Arranger
"Night and Day" (EMI)	2011	Steven Rossitto	Arranger
"Slammin' Joes" (Independent)	2011	Daryl McKenzie Jazz Orchestra	Producer/Composer/Trombone
