= Sam Anning =

Australian jazz bassist

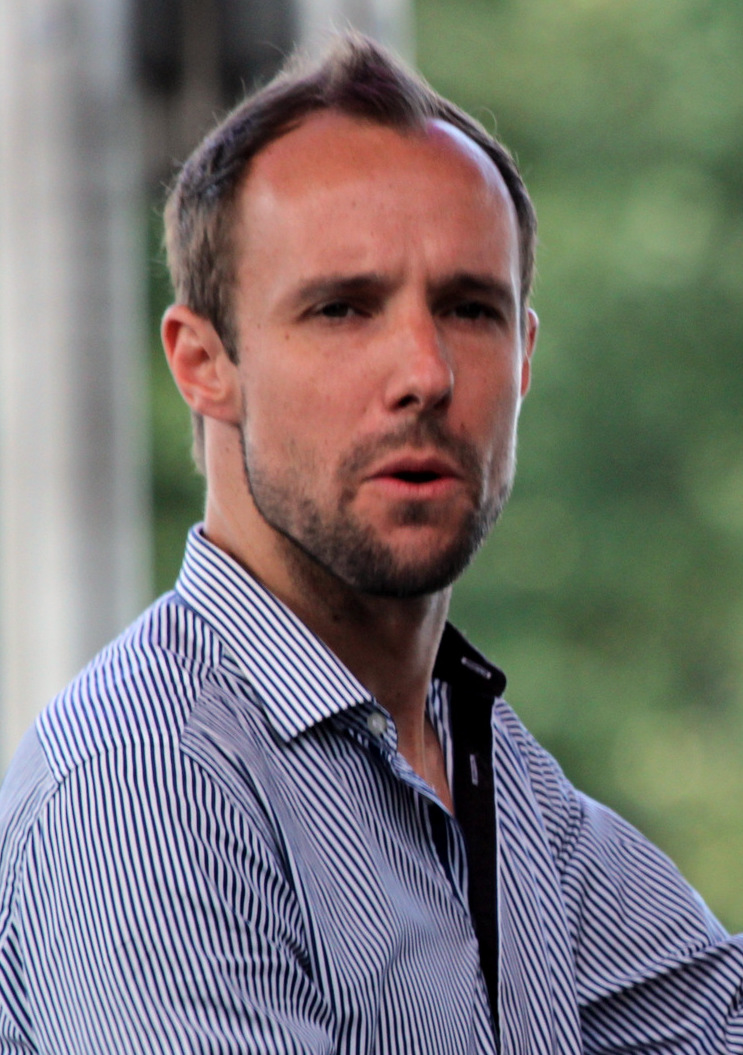
- Anning in 2014

Background information
- Origin: Australia
- Genre: Jazz
- Occupation: Bassist

Sam Anning is an Australian jazz bassist. He was nominated for ARIA Awards for Best Jazz Album with Dale Barlow, George Coleman Jr, Mark Fitzgibbon & Sam Anning - Treat Me Gently in 2009 and with Allan Browne, Marc Hannaford, Sam Anning - Shreveport Stomp in 2011.

== Discography ==
Title	Album details
Treat Me Gently (with Dale Barlow, George Coleman Jr & Mark Fitzgibbons)	Released: November 2008; Label: Head Records
Homage (with Allan Browne and Marc Hannaford )	Released: 14 April 2009; Label: Jazzhead (Head107)
Shreveport Stomp (with Allan Browne and Marc Hannaford)	Released: 2011; Label: Jazzhead (Head140)
Sweethears (with Julien Wilson & Allan Browne)	Released: November 2012; Label: Lionsharecords
Across a Field as Vast as One	Released: 18 May 2018; Format: CD, LP, Digital download; Label: Earshift Records (EAR022)
Little Did They Know (with Angela Davis and Tony Gould)	Released: 10 May 2019; Format: Label: ABC Music
Our Songs, Not Songs (with Kristin Berardi)	Released: 5 September 2019; Format: Label: Earshift Music
Pistils (with Rajiv Jayaweera)	Released: 5 June 2020; Format: Label: Earshift Music
Guardian of the Thunderhead (with George and Ivy)	Released: January 2021; Format: Label: Sam Anning
Oaatchapai	Released: December 2021; Format: Label: Sam Anning
Between Panic & Peace (with Andrea Keller & Shannon Barnett)	Released: March 2022; Format: Label: Barnett, Anning, Keller
Earthen	Released: April 2024; Format: digital; Label: Earshift

== Awards and nominations ==
=== AIR Awards ===
The Australian Independent Record Awards (commonly known informally as AIR Awards) is an annual awards night to recognise, promote and celebrate the success of Australia's Independent Music sector.

Year	Nominee / work	Award	Result
2011	Shreveport Stomp	Best Independent Jazz Album	Nominated
2022	Oaatchapai	Best Independent Jazz Album or EP	Nominated
2025	Earthen	Best Independent Heavy Album or EP	Nominated

=== ARIA Music Awards ===
The ARIA Music Awards is an annual awards ceremony that recognises excellence, innovation, and achievement across all genres of Australian music.

Year	Nominee / work	Award	Result	Ref.
2009	Treat Me Gently	Best Jazz Album	Nominated	
2011	Shreveport Stomp	Best Jazz Album	Nominated	
2022	Oaatchapai	Best Jazz Album	Nominated	

=== Australian Music Prize ===
The Australian Music Prize (the AMP) is an annual award of $30,000 given to an Australian band or solo artist in recognition of the merit of an album released during the year of award. The commenced in 2005.

Year	Nominee / work	Award	Result
2018	Across A Field As Vast As One	Australian Music Prize	Nominated

=== Music Victoria Awards ===
The Music Victoria Awards are an annual awards night celebrating Victorian music. They commenced in 2006.

Year	Nominee / work	Award	Result	Ref.
2018	Across a Field as Vast as One (as Sam Anning Sextet)	Best Jazz Album	Won	
2022	Sam Anning	Best Jazz Work	Nominated	
