= Jeremy Rose =

Jeremy Rose may refer to:

- Jeremy Rose (jockey)
- Jeremy Rose (musician)
