= Steve Barry =

Steve Barry may refer to:

- Steve Barry (race walker), Welsh race walker
- Steve Barry (musician), New Zealand born jazz pianist and composer

== See also ==
- Steeve Barry, French rugby sevens player
- Steve Barri, American songwriter and record producer
