= The Vampires (band) =

Australian world roots jazz group

- Origin: Sydney, Australia
- Genre: World-roots jazz
- Years active: 2005–present
- Label: Earshift Music
- Members: Jeremy Rose; Nick Garbett; Alex Masso; Noel Mason
- Past members: Alex Boneham, Mike Majkowski
- Website: www.thevampires.com.au

The Vampires are an Australian world roots jazz group comprising saxophonist Jeremy Rose, trumpeter Nick Garbett, drummer Alex Masso, and bassist Mike Majkowski.

== History ==
The band formed in their final year of studying for their Bachelor of Music (jazz performance) at the Sydney Conservatorium of Music in 2005.

The band has released six albums and toured extensively around Australia, Germany, the UK, Czech Republic, Austria and Italy. The band performs mostly original music by Jeremy Rose and Nick Garbett that draws inspiration from their travels around the world and experiences in life. The band has performed at every major jazz festival in Australia, the Love Supreme Festival (UK), Glasgow Jazz Festival, Edingburgh Jazz Festival, Jazzahead Festival (Bremen, Germany), and the Enjoy Jazz Festival (Mannheim, Germany).

== Members ==
- Nick Garbett (trumpet)
- Jeremy Rose (alto, tenor and soprano saxophones, clarinet, bass clarinet and piano)
- Alex Masso (drums and percussion)
- Alex Boneham (double bass, 2008–present)
- Mike Majkowski (double bass, 2006–2008)

The band members have lived in different parts of the world – bassist Alex Boneham became an established presence in Los Angeles, and Nick Garbett lived in Lampedusa, Italy.

On 1 March 2022, Alex Masso was appointed executive officer of the Australian Music Association.

== Collaborators ==
- Chris Abrahams (piano, organ, prophet, super 6, Quantum, Rhodes, 2021–2022, on Nightjar)
- Jonathan Zwartz (double bass, 2014–2017, on The Vampires Meet Lionel Loueke)
- Shannon Barnett (occasional guest, trombone on South Coasting, Chellowdene, and Garfish)
- Fabian Hevia (guest, percussion, approx. 2009–2012, on Chellowdene and Garfish)
- Ben Hauptmann (guest, guitar, 2014–2017)
- Lionel Loueke (guest, guitar, 2016, on The Vampires Meet Lionel Loueke)
- Danny Fischer (guest, drums, 2016, on The Vampires Meet Lionel Loueke)
- Also one off performances with Matt Smith (guitar), Tobias Backhaus (drums), James Greening (trombone), Mike Rivett (saxophone), Peter Farrar (saxophone), Lloyd Swanton, Max Alduca, Rory Brown, Brett Hirst, Tom Botting, and Zephyr Quartet.

== Awards and nominations ==
The Vampires were a finalist for Best Australian Jazz Ensemble and Best Produced Album at the Australian Jazz Bell Awards and in the AIR Awards.

=== ARIA Music Awards ===
The ARIA Music Awards is an annual awards ceremony held by the Australian Recording Industry Association.

Year	Nominee / work	Award	Result
2017	The Vampires Meet Lionel Loueke	Best Jazz Album	Nominated
2023	Nightjar (featuring Chris Abrahams)	Best Jazz Album	Won
2026	Skydancer	Best Jazz Album	Nominated

=== Australian Music Prize ===
The Australian Music Prize (the AMP) is an annual award of $30,000 given to an Australian band or solo artist in recognition of the merit of an album released during the year of award. They commenced in 2005. The Vampires were the first instrumental act to be shortlisted for this prize.

Year	Nominee / work	Award	Result
2017	The Vampires meet Lionel Loueke	Australian Music Prize	Nominated

== Discography ==
=== Albums ===
Title	Album details
South Coasting	Released: March 2008; Label: Jazzgroove Records
Chellowdene	Released: March 2010; Label: Earshift Music
Garfish	Released: 25 March 2012; Label: Earshift Music (EAR006)
Tiro	Released: October 2013; Label: Earshift Music
The Vampires Meet Lionel Loueke	Released: 5 May 2017; Label: Earshift Music (EAR017)
Pacifica	Released: February 2019; Label: Earshift Music (EAR026)
