= Jeremy Rose (musician) =

Australian jazz saxophonist (born 1984)

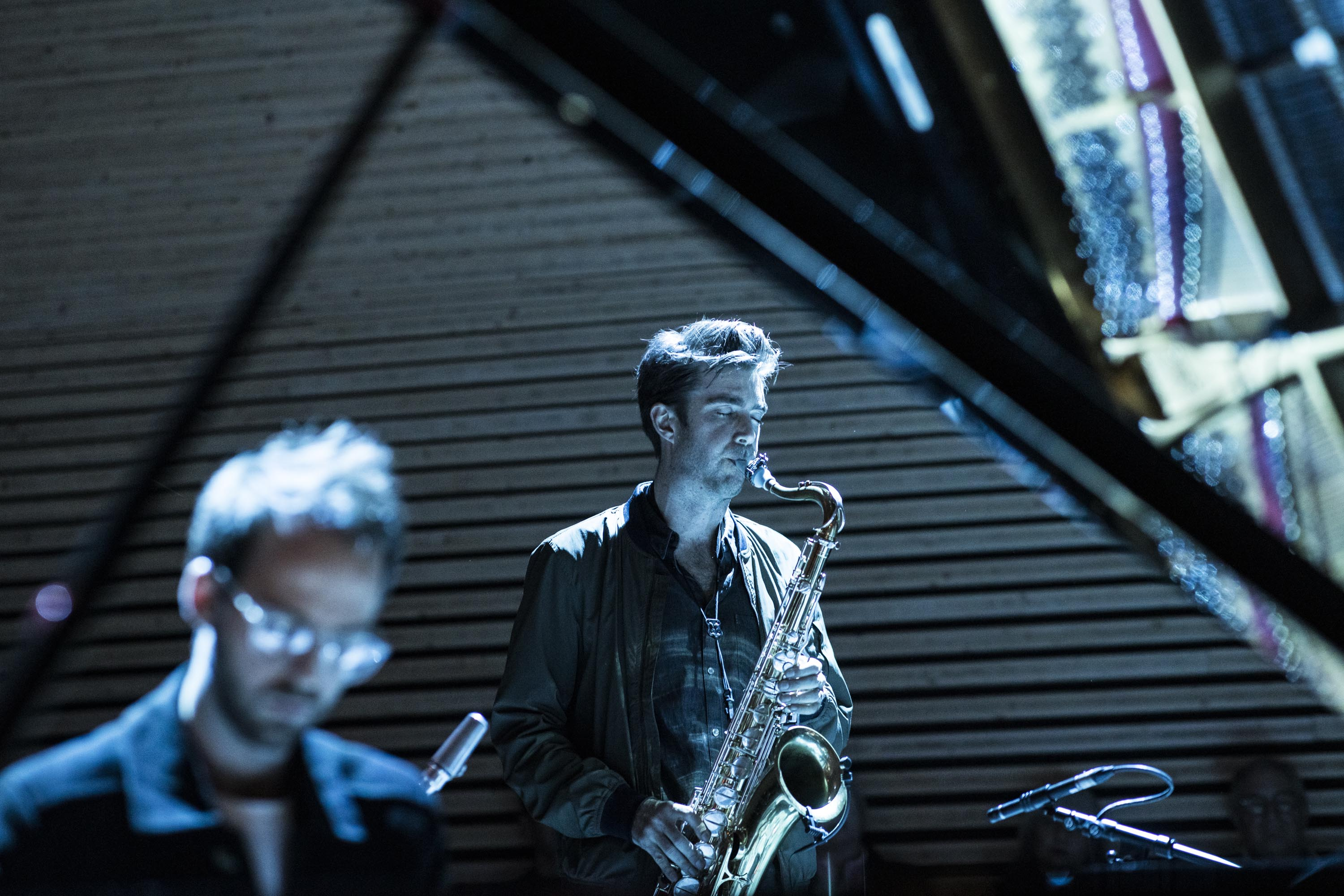

Background information
- Born: August 21, 1984 (age 42); Sydney, Australia
- Genres: Jazz
- Occupation: Musician
- Instruments: Saxophone, bass clarinet, piano, flute
- Labels: Earshift Music, ABC Jazz, Jazzgroove Music, Tall Poppies
- Member of: The Vampires
- Website: jeremyrose.com.au

Jeremy Rose is an Australian jazz saxophonist, bass clarinettist, composer, bandleader, academic and record label director. He is a founding member of The Vampires, and founder and artistic director of the Sydney-based independent jazz label Earshift Music. Rose is also a Lecturer in Music Industry at the Sydney Conservatorium of Music, University of Sydney.

== Early life and education ==
Rose was born in Sydney, Australia. He began piano studies at the age of six, clarinet at eight, and saxophone at eleven. He studied jazz performance at the Sydney Conservatorium of Music, completing a Bachelor of Music with first class honours in 2007, and later completed a PhD in composition at the same institution.

== Career ==
Rose has led or co-led a number of ensembles, including the Jeremy Rose Quartet, The Vampires, The Strides, Compass Quartet, Vazesh, Visions of Nar, Project Infinity and the Earshift Orchestra.

In 2005, Rose co-founded The Vampires. The group has toured in Australia, Europe and the United Kingdom and has released albums including The Vampires Meet Lionel Loueke, Pacifica and Nightjar. In 2023, The Vampires featuring Chris Abrahams won the ARIA Award for Best Jazz Album for Nightjar.

Rose formed the Earshift Orchestra for large-scale works including Iron in the Blood, a narrative jazz concert inspired by Robert Hughes' The Fatal Shore. The work was presented at the 2020 Sydney Festival at City Recital Hall and was composed and conducted by Rose for a 17-piece orchestra.

In 2021, Rose premiered Disruption! The Voice of Drums at the Sydney Festival with the Earshift Orchestra, featuring drummers Simon Barker and Chloe Kim. The work won the 2022 APRA AMCOS Art Music Award for Performance of the Year: Jazz/Improvised Music.

Rose’s project Infinity explores the intersection of jazz improvisation, minimalism, ambient music and electronic sound. The quartet features Rose on saxophones and bass clarinet, Novak Manojlovic on piano/keyboards, Tully Ryan on drums and Ben Carey on modular synthesiser. The group’s first album, Project Infinity: Live at Phoenix Central Park, was released in 2023 and documented a live performance at Phoenix Central Park in Sydney. A second album, Infinity II, was released in 2025 and was recorded live at Lazybones Lounge in Marrickville, Sydney. Reviewing Infinity II, UK Vibe described the album as “a bold, adventurous journey”, noting its blend of jazz, ambient and electronic elements.

Rose’s intercultural projects include Vazesh, with Iranian tar player Hamed Sadeghi and bassist Lloyd Swanton, and Visions of Nar, with pianist Zela Margossian. Vazesh’s album The Sacred Key was nominated for the ARIA Award for Best Jazz Album in 2021.

In 2024, Rose was profiled by Jenna Price in The Sydney Morning Herald Spectrum, in an article covering his early musical development, work with Earshift Music, international touring with The Vampires and ARIA Award win.

In 2025, Rose’s Disruption! The Voice of Drums was presented at the Barbican as part of the EFG London Jazz Festival in a Melbourne International Jazz Festival showcase of Australian jazz, and later at Jazztopad Festival at the National Forum of Music in Wrocław, Poland.

== Earshift Music ==
In 2009, Rose founded the label Earshift Music, a Sydney-based independent record label for jazz and adventurous music. In 2024, Rose was profiled by Jenna Price in The Sydney Morning Herald Spectrum, in an article covering his work as a musician, label director and ARIA Award-winning member of The Vampires. The label has released music by Rose’s own projects as well as Australian jazz and improvised music artists. In 2025, Rhythms Magazine described a two-night Earshift Music showcase at the Melbourne International Jazz Festival as a highlight of the festival, noting that Earshift had around 100 releases and was founded by Rose in Sydney in 2009.

== Academic work ==
Rose is a lecturer in music industry at the Sydney Conservatorium of Music. His research and writing include work on improvisation, creative collaboration, intercultural composition and Australian jazz practice.

== Discography ==
=== As leader ===
- Project Infinity: Live at Phoenix Central Park (Earshift Music, 2023)
- Infinity II (Earshift Music, 2025)
- Face to Face (Earshift Music, 2022)
- Within and Without feat. Kurt Rosenwinkel (Earshift Music, 2017)
- Sand Lines (Earshift Music, 2015)
- Chiba (Earshift Music, 2009)

With The Earshift Orchestra

- Iron in the Blood (ABC Jazz, 2016)
- Disruption: The Voice of Drums featuring Simon Barker and Chloe Kim (Earshift Music, 2022)
- Discordia (Earshift Music, 2024)

With The Vampires

- Skydancer (Earshift Music, 2026)
- Nightjar (Earshift Music, 2023)
- Pacifica (Earshift Music, 2019)
- The Vampires Meet Lionel Loueke (Earshift Music, 2017)
- Tiro (Earshift Music, 2013)
- Garfish (Earshift Music, 2012)
- Chellowdene (Earshift Music, 2009)
- South Coasting (Jazzgroove Music, 2008)

With Visions of Nar

- Awakening (Earshift Music, 2026)
- Daughter of the Sea (ABC Jazz/Earshift Music, 2023)

With Vazesh

- Vazesh (Earshift Music, 2023)
- The Sacred Key (Earshift Music, 2021)

With The Strides

- The Youth, The Rich & The Fake (Earshift Music, 2015)
- Reclamation (Earshift Music, 2011)
- The Strides (Earshift Music, 2009)

With Compass Quartet

- Oneirology featuring Jackson Harrison (Earshift Music, 2013)
- Ode to an Auto Rickshaw featuring Bobby Singh and Sarangan Sriranganathan (Earshift Music, 2011)
- Tango Abrazo with Marcello Maio and Julian Curwin (Tall Poppies, 2013)

=== As sideman ===
With Cameron Undy

- Bone (Earshift Music, 2002)

With Steve Barry Quartet

- Blueprints and Vignettes (Earshift Music, 2017)

== Awards and nominations ==
=== AIR Awards ===
The Australian Independent Record Awards, commonly known as the AIR Awards, are annual awards presented by the Australian Independent Record Labels Association to recognise Australia's independent music sector.

Year	Nominee / work	Award	Result	Ref.
2018	The Vampires Meet Lionel Loueke – The Vampires	Best Independent Jazz Album	Nominated	
2018	Within and Without	Best Independent Jazz Album	Nominated	
2023	Face to Face	Best Independent Jazz Album or EP	Nominated	

=== ARIA Music Awards ===
The ARIA Music Awards are annual awards presented by the Australian Recording Industry Association.

Year	Nominee / work	Award	Result	Ref.
2017	The Vampires Meet Lionel Loueke – The Vampires	Best Jazz Album	Nominated	
2021	The Sacred Key – Vazesh	Best Jazz Album	Nominated	
2023	Cull Portal – Lance Gurisik featuring Jeremy Rose	Best Jazz Album	Nominated	
2023	Nightjar – The Vampires featuring Chris Abrahams	Best Jazz Album	Won	

=== APRA AMCOS Awards / Art Music Awards ===
The Art Music Awards are presented by APRA AMCOS and the Australian Music Centre to recognise achievement in contemporary classical music, jazz, improvised music, experimental music and sound art.

Year	Nominee / work	Award	Result	Ref.
2012	River Meeting Suite	Work of the Year: Jazz	Nominated	
2013	Jeremy Rose	Award for Excellence in Jazz	Nominated	
2015	Jeremy Rose	Professional Development Award – Jazz	Won	
2018	Jeremy Rose	Award for Excellence in Jazz	Nominated	
2019	Jeremy Rose	Award for Excellence in Jazz	Nominated	
2021	The Sacred Key – Vazesh	Performance of the Year: Jazz / Improvised Music	Nominated	
2022	Disruption! The Voice of Drums – Jeremy Rose & The Earshift Orchestra featuring Simon Barker and Chloe Kim	Performance of the Year: Jazz / Improvised Music	Won	

=== Australian Jazz Bell Awards ===
The Australian Jazz Bell Awards, also known as the Bell Awards, were annual awards recognising achievement in Australian jazz.

Year	Nominee / work	Award	Result	Ref.
2009	Jeremy Rose	Young Australian Jazz Artist of the Year	Won	
2017	Iron in the Blood – Jeremy Rose and The Earshift Orchestra	Best Australian Instrumental Jazz Album	Nominated	
2017	Iron in the Blood – Jeremy Rose and The Earshift Orchestra	Best Produced Album	Won	
2017	The Vampires	Best Australian Jazz Ensemble of the Year	Nominated	
