= Start Living =

Australian music television show (1967)

- Genre: Music television
- Presented by: Judy Jacques; Idris Jones
- Country of origin: Australia
- Original language: English

Production
- Producer: Barry Langford

Original release
- Network: ABC Television
- Release: 19 March – 24 September 1967

Start Living was an Australian music television show broadcast by the ABC in 1967. It was broadcast on Sundays, beginning on 19 March and ending on 24 September. It was hosted by Judy Jacques and Idris Jones, produced by Barry Langford and aimed at a teenage audience.

== See also ==
- List of Australian music television shows
- List of Australian television series
