= Nick Haywood =

Australian jazz musician (born 1961)

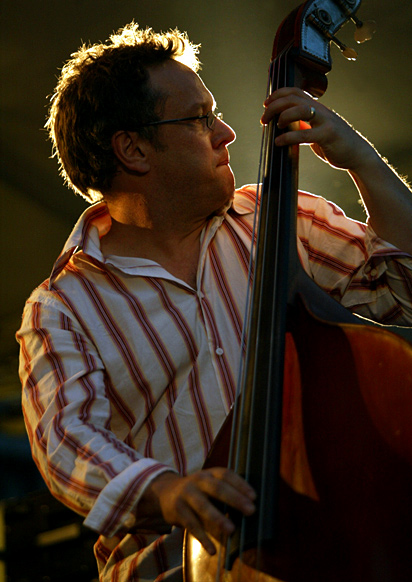
- Nick Haywood performs at the Midi Jazz Festival 2005 in Beijing, China. Photo by Antonis Shen

Background information
- Born: 1961 (age 64–65)
- Genre: Jazz
- Occupation: Musician
- Instrument: Double bass
- Years active: 1989–present

Nick Haywood is an Australian jazz double bassist, composer, and music educator in Melbourne.

He has worked with Don Burrows, Dale Barlow, Paul Grabowsky, Bernie McGann, and James Morrison, and with many international jazz musicians, including Nat Adderley, Buddy Greco, Kenny Kirkland, Claire Martin, Jack Parnell, Mark Murphy and Petra Haden. He has been featured on over 100 albums.

== Early life ==
Born in 1961, Haywood first started playing an electric bass guitar at eight years of age but did not consider undertaking a career as a professional musician. In 1976 he started playing double bass. After finishing school he worked in a brewery and a tin mine.

In his mid 20s he enrolled in a Diploma of Music course at the Victorian College of the Arts and graduated in 1988.

== Music career ==
In 1999 Haywood was nominated for two ARIA Music Awards: for Best Jazz Recording for Sudden in a Shaft of Sunlight by Browne-Haywood-Stevens and Best Adult Contemporary for Beat Club by The Black Sorrows.

The Melbourne International Arts Festival has provided several opportunities to showcase Haywood's composing and performing talents. In 2001 he performed with his band Dodge in the Spiegeltent.

An anniversary concert of John Sangster's Lord of the Rings at the Malvern Town Hall in 2003 also featured Haywood with many of the original musicians.

Haywood, Eugene Ball, and Andrea Keller were the nucleus of the eleven-piece Bennetts Lane Big Band, which was formed in 2001. The band has been described by the National Library of Australia as "Melbourne's premier large contemporary jazz ensemble" and "comprised of some of Australia's most celebrated improvisers and composers."'

A grant from the Alan C. Rose Memorial Project in 2004 enabled Haywood to study in New York City with American jazz bassists Gary Peacock and Rufus Reid. Later that year he completed a Master of Music Performance degree at the Victorian College of the Arts.

=== Music education career ===
Haywood has been a music lecturer in the Performing Arts Department at Northern Melbourne Institute of TAFE (NMIT) since 2001.

With the establishment of the Bachelor of Australian Popular Music course at NMIT in 2007, he became Head of Program/Senior Lecturer in the Department of Music at NMIT. He also teaches privately, and conducts master classes at festivals and institutions around Australia and internationally.

A 2005 agreement between NMIT and the Beijing Midi School of Music, a private music school in Beijing focussing on modern music genres, resulted in Haywood establishing a ten-week music program and teaching the Advanced Diploma of Music Performance to students in Beijing, as well as the opportunity to perform in various Beijing Jazz clubs. He was one of the prominent performers at the 2005 Beijing Jazz Festival.

== Discography ==
=== Albums ===
List of albums, with selected details
Title	Details
King, Dude and Dunce (as Browne Haywood Stevens)	Released: 1996; Format: CD; Label: Newmarket Music
Sudden in a Shaft of Sunlight (as Browne Haywood Stevens)	Released: 1998; Format: CD; Label: ABC Jazz (4978632)
Live at Bennett's Lane (with Robert Burke, Tony Gould & Tony Floyd)	Released: 2002; Format: CD; Label: ABC Jazz
1234 (as Nick Haywood Quartet)	Released: 2011; Format: CD, digital; Label: Jazzhead (HEAD147)
2 Pinots, 2 Pales, 2 Hours (with Ted Vining & Tony Gould)	Released: June 2015; Format: Digital; Label: Move
Many Rivers (as Nick Haywood Trio)	Released: 2017; Format: CD, digital; Label: Jazzhead (HEAD232)
Songs from My Father (as Nick Haywood Quintet with Petra Haden)	Released: September 2020; Format: digital; Label: ABC
Back to the Garden (with Petra Haden)	Released: September 2021; Format: digital; Label: Nick Hayward

== Awards and nominations ==
=== ARIA Music Awards ===
The ARIA Music Awards is an annual awards ceremony that recognises excellence, innovation, and achievement across all genres of Australian music. They commenced in 1987.

Year	Nominee / work	Award	Result	Ref.
1999	Sudden in a Shaft of Sunlight (with Browne and Stevens)	Best Jazz Album	Nominated	
2021	Songs from My Father (with Petra Haden)	Best Jazz Album	Nominated	
