= AtmaSphere =

- Genres: Jazz
- Years active: 1991–2000
- Past members: David Jones; Daryl Pratt; Adam Armstrong; Dev Gopalasamy; Carmen Warrington; Evripides Evripidou; Steve Hunter (fill-in)

AtmaSphere is an Australian jazz ensemble formed and led by drummer David Jones.

== History ==
AtmaShere was founded by Jones in Sydney in 1991, with Daryl Pratt (vibraphone and effects), Adam Armstrong (electric and acoustic bass) and Dev Gopalasamy as founding members. The ensemble's music initially focused on polyrhythms, but later Carmen Warrington joined to add the spoken word.

The band played at jazz festivals as well as clubs in Sydney such as the Harbourside Brasserie, the Basement, and Strawberry Hills Hotel. They also presented a series of concerts titled "Lyrical Jumpcut" at the Pilgrim Theatre, featuring jazz pianist Roger Frampton and with Pulitzer Prize-winning poet Yusef Komunyakaa in a guest performance. Steve Hunter filled in for Armstrong, who was abroad, for these concerts.

The group was nominated for the ARIA Award for Best Jazz Album in 1994 for their album Flying. Flying was released in 1993 and included guest appearances from Mike Nock and Don Burrows.

The band opened the original JazzLab in Bennetts Lane in Melbourne in 2000, in 2000, with Evripides Evripidou on bass, as Armstrong had permanently relocated to New York City.

The group disbanded after 2000, after Jones and Warrington had moved back to Melbourne. Jones later wrote that his time with the ensemble was "one of the most creative periods of my career".

== Members ==
- David Jones (drums and percussion)
- Daryl Pratt (vibraphone and effects)
- Adam Armstrong (bass)
- Carmen Warrington (vocals)
- Dev Gopalasamy (guitar)

== Discography ==
=== Albums ===
List of albums, with selected details
Title	Details
Flying	Released: 1993; Format: CD; Label: Tall Poppies (TP038)
Seasons of the Heart	Released: September 1999; Format: CD; Label:AtmaSphere

== Awards and nominations ==
=== ARIA Music Awards ===
The ARIA Music Awards is an annual awards ceremony that recognises excellence, innovation, and achievement across all genres of Australian music. They commenced in 1987.

Year	Nominee / work	Award	Result	Ref.
1994	Flying	Best Jazz Album	Nominated	
