= Melbourne Jazz Fringe Festival =

- Melbourne Jazz Fringe Festival logo (2008)
- Genre: Jazz
- Dates: May
- Location: (Australia) Melbourne
- Years active: 2005 – 2013

The Melbourne Jazz Fringe Festival was an annual international jazz festival held in Melbourne, Australia in April or May. The festival was formed in 2005 to celebrate Melbourne’s creative jazz scene.

Major sponsors include Victoria University, Big Trousers, APRA, Federation Square, Arts Victoria 2008.

== Artist lineups ==
=== Melbourne Jazz Fringe Festival 2006 ===
Adam Simmons Quartet, Andrea Keller Quartet, Andrew Swann Group, Anita Hustas Trio, Ball/Magnusson/Talia, Barnett/Lee/Hendry Trio, Lawrence Folvig/Eamon McNelis Duo, Big Fela, Bone Clan Boundaries Band, The Boys, BUM - Bohjass Upas Militia, BYAR, Charles St Trio, Erik Griswold, Fallingwater Trio, Fran Swinn, Gideon Brazil, The Hoodangers, Hughes/Ferella/Hannaford, Jamie Oehlers and Sam Keevers, Jamie Oehlers and Julien Wilson, Joanne Cannon, Julien Wilson Trio, Keller, Murphy & Browne, Kynan Robinson's Escalators, MAG Solo guitar, Murphy's Law, The New Willow Neilson Quintet, Paper Hat Conversations, Phil Noy Quartet, Stephen Grant, Tim Pledger Trio, Tony Gorman (Sydney) - Songs of Hope, 12 Tone Diamonds, Ren Walters Group, Wanders/Simmons/Brown/Baxter and Zeno's Wig.

=== Melbourne Jazz Fringe Festival 2007 ===
20th Century Dog (Sydney), Anita Hustas Trio ‘Anemone’, Andrea Keller Quartet, Allan Browne’s Drunken Boat, Bennetts Lane Big Band, Bumford, Byar Gamelan Orchestra, Colin Hopkins, Craig Fermanis Trio Erik Griswold (Brisbane/USA), Elana Stone/Stephen Magnusson/Julien Wilson, Fran Swinn Trio, Frock. Falling Water, Gerard Masters Trio (Sydney), Gian Slater Band, Hannaford/Tinkler/Shaw-Reynolds, Harrow, Jex Saarelaht Trio, Mark Shepherd, Marinucci/Di Sario/Archer, Meter Maid, Nooks and Crannies curated by Phil Bywater, Monopod, Myles Mumford, New Blood, Michelle Nicolle Quartet, The Natives, Nathan Slater Ensemble, Peter Knight’s 5+2 Brass Ensemble, Rabid Hawk, Ren Walters’ Tip, Simon Barker, Silo String Quartet, Sam Keevers, Stephen Magnusson Trio, Scott Tinkler, Trio Apoplectic (Sydney), Tim Pledger Trio, Tristram Williams’ Diode, Twelve Tone Diamonds, Tzigas, Vada, Vanessa Tomlinson (Brisbane) and Whitesploitation.

=== Melbourne Jazz Fringe Festival 2008 ===
Allan Browne’s ‘Freejazz’, Anthony Schulz /Anita Hustas, Antripodean Collective, Ben Carr Trio, Ben Winkelman Trio, Big Fela, Bohjass, Dave Brown’s ‘Candlesnuffer’, Chris Hale/Gian Slater, Erik Griswold’s ‘Ecstatic Music’, Eugene Ball/Geoff Hughes Duo, Flap!, Harmless, Jacq Gawler Band, Joe Talia Solo, Kate Vigo Orchestra, Kynan Robinson’s ‘Escalators’, Marc Hannaford, Matt Keegan Trio, Megan Washington/Paul Grabowsky, Ok Ok Ok, Spontaneous Acts of Provocation, Stephen Magnusson/Frank Di Sario, Peter Knight, Peter Rechniewski Essay Launch, Ren Walters’ ‘this ENSEMBLE’, Rob Vincs Trio, The Snappers, The Twoks, Victoria University Showcase and Zoe and the Buttercups.

=== Melbourne Jazz Fringe Festival 2009 ===
Andrea Keller, Geoff Hughes, Kenny Weir, Gian Slater, Dead Ants Rainbow (Troy Naumoff, Mat Blackwell, Freya Hollick, Lachlan Ewbank, Julius Millar, Will Neal, Angus Leslie), Adam Simmons/Brian O’Dwyer, Chris Young/Tom Fryer/Ted Vining, Lloyd Honeybrook/Sean Baxter, Pi O, Andrew Lindsay, Allan Browne, David Rex, Sonja Horbelt, Steven Grant, Tamara Murphy, Zoe Frater Quintet, Alcohotlicks, The Gravikords, Sam Price, Tim Wilson, Noriko Tadano & Gerry Hale.

== Awards ==
=== Atlantis award ===
This award is sponsored by Atlantis Sound and comprises one day of recording with producer/engineer Myles Mumford at Atlantis Sound Studios. It is awarded to an artist who has displayed consistent originality in producing intelligent music making. The Atlantis Award is not open to nominations by the public or by artists, rather it is awarded by the MJFF Board.

== Venues ==
The Melbourne Jazz Fringe features a series of performances at venues including Bar Open, Lebowski’s, Bennetts Lane Jazz Club, Café 303, La Mama and the Northcote Uniting Church.
