= Barry Buckley =

Australian musician, dental technician (1938–2006)

Barry Buckley (1938–2006) was an Australian jazz double bassist and dental technician from Melbourne, a notable presence on the modern jazz scene for over 40 years.

In the mid-1950s Buckley joined pianist David Martin, trumpeter Keith Hounslow, drummer Stewart Speer (later of Max Merritt fame) and saxophonist Brian Brown to form the first Brian Brown Quintet becoming Australia's foremost hard bop group, regularly playing at Horst Liepolt's Jazz Centre 44 in St Kilda.

Later Buckley teamed with drummer Ted Vining and pianist Don Wilde with Don Bennett as host to run the Cool Cats Show on Channel 7 for two years.

For several years in the early 1960s Buckley dropped out of the Jazz scene to establish Buckley-Hutton laboratories, which would become one of the biggest dental labs in the southern hemisphere, and to devote time to family.

He emerged in the late sixties teaming up with Brian Brown, Tony Gould and Ted Vining to form the Brian Brown Quartet. After a few years Gould left the group, replaced by a young Bob Sedergreen. Around 1969 the trio of Buckley, Sedergreen and Vining formed and played together for the next 37 years. The Quartet disbanded in 1979 when Vining moved north to Sydney then Brisbane.

In the 1980s Buckley joined Martin Jackson (one of the founders of the Melbourne Jazz Co-operative) in his group Odwala and also participated in Sedergreen's Blues on the Boil, and performed with Bernie McGann.

Buckley's last performance was with the Ted Vining Trio at the North Coast Jazz Festival in Bangalow three months before his death from cancer in September 2006. Three days before his death Buckley donated an historic three-stringed DeVereaux double bass to the Museum of Victoria.
