= Shannon Barnett =

Australian trombonist and composer

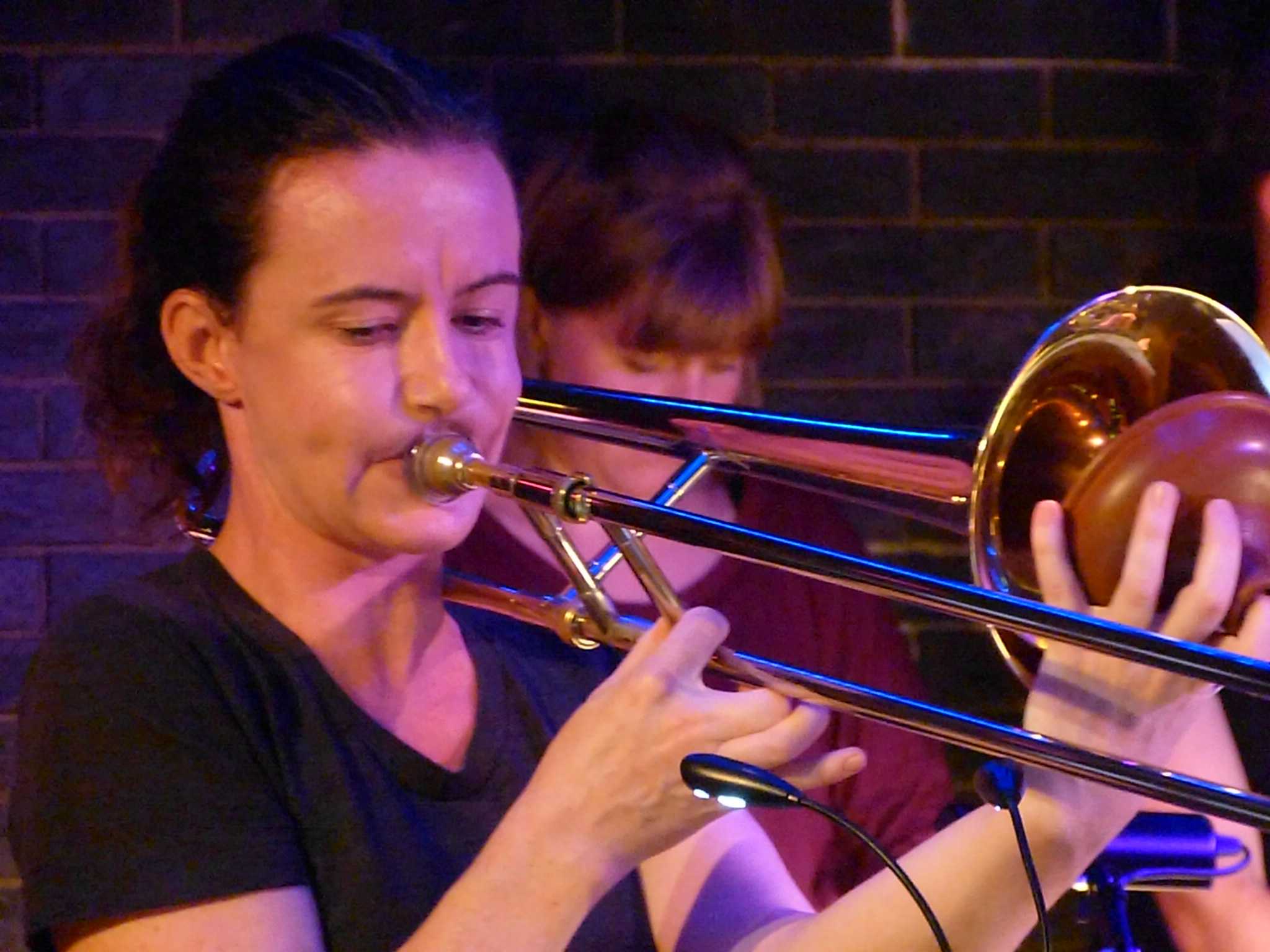
- Barnett in 2018

Background information
- Born: 1982 (age 43–44); Traralgon, Victoria, Australia
- Instrument: Trombone

Shannon Barnett (born 1982) is an Australian trombonist, composer, and vocalist.

== Background ==
Barnett was born in Traralgon. She studied at the Victorian College of the Arts, and performed in Australian ensembles including Vada, The Bamboos, The Black Arm Band, The Vampires, and as a guest with the Andrea Keller Quartet, on the 2004 ABC Jazz release Angels and Rascals.

Barnett has also appeared with the Australian Art Orchestra, Barney McAll’s Mother of Dreams and Secrets featuring Kurt Rosenwinkel and Charlie Haden.

From 2009 to 2010, Barnett worked as a multi-instrumentalist and composer with the contemporary circus group Circus Oz, as part of the Barely Contained season.

In 2011, Barnett moved to New York City to study for a Master of Music degree. Whilst living there she also performed with Darcy James Argue's Secret Society, Pedro Giraudo, Cyrille Aimée and the Birdland Big Band.

In 2014, Barnett became a member of the WDR Big Band in Cologne, Germany, and performed with guest artists including Christian McBride, Paquito D'Rivera, Ron Carter, Maria Schneider, Joshua Redman, Michel Camilo, Richard Bona and Jimmy Heath, but left in 2018 to pursue her own projects.

In 2015, Barnett formed her own quartet with Cologne-based musicians Stefan Karl Schmid (tenor saxophone), David Helm (double-bass) and Fabian Arends (drums). They released their debut album Hype in 2017.

In 2019, she became professor for jazz trombone at the Hochschule für Musik und Tanz Köln in Cologne, Germany.

In 2025, she released her first album as a singer-songwriter, How Much is the Moon?, and performed it with the EOS Chamber Orchestra at the Monheim Triennale.

== Awards ==
Shannon was named Young Australian Jazz Artist of the Year at the 2007 Australian Jazz Bell Awards.

In 2020, she received the WDR Jazzpreis for Improvisation and in 2022, the German Jazz Prize in the brass instrument category.

== Releases ==
As a leader:

- 2010: Country - Shannon Barnett Quartet (Which Way Music)
- 2017: Hype - Shannon Barnett Quartet (Challenge/Double Moon)
- 2021: Wolves and Mirrors (Klaeng)
- 2022: Bad Lover - Shannon Barnett Quartet (Toy Piano Records)
- 2023: Alive at Loft - Shannon Barnett Quartet (Klang Records)
- 2025: How Much is the Moon? - Shannon Barnett

As a sideperson:

- 2004: Songs from the Dirty South - Vada
- 2004: In My Head - Gian Slater
- 2005: Parallels/Layers - Marc Hannaford
- 2005: Angels and Rascals - Andrea Keller
- 2007: Rawville - The Bamboos
- 2007: Live at 303 - Vada
- 2015: Köln - Marshall Gilkes and the WDR Big Band
- 2015: My Personal Songbook - Ron Carter and the WDR Big Band
- 2016: Channels of Energy - Antonio Sanchez, Vince Mendoza and the WDR Big Band (CAM)
- 2017: Resdicovered Ellington - Dick Oatts, Garry Dial and the WDR Big Band
- 2020: Time Labyrinth - Simon Nabatov
- 2020: Songs You Like a Lot - HR Big Band feat. Hollenbeck, Versace, Bleckmann and McGarry
- 2020: Pyjama - Stefan Karl Schmid
- 2020: Marble - Hendrika Entzian +
- 2021: Subsonic - States of Play
- 2022: Fractures - Fabian Arends
- 2022: Lily of the Nile - LIUN + The Science Fiction Band
- 2022: Between Panic and Peace - Barnett/Anning/Keller
- 2023: Message From Outer Space - Meteors
- 2024: Mumbling On The Floor - Marek Johnson
- 2024: Raging Bulgakov - Simon Nabatov
