= David Jones (drummer) =

Australian drummer (born c.1958)

- Born: c. 1958; Melbourne, Australia
- Genres: Jazz drumming, guided meditation
- Instrument: Drums

David Jones (born c. 1958) is an Australian jazz drummer and composer. He has also created guided meditation CDs. From 1991 until 2000, he was founder and leader of the jazz ensemble AtmaSphere. He also teaches music.

His 2008 album, Colours of the Drum, was nominated for an ARIA Award. In 2010, he received the prestigious Melbourne Prize for Music, the first time a major music prize had been awarded to a drummer.

== Early life ==
David Jones was born around 1958, the son of a policeman, and lived in the Melbourne suburb of Broadmeadows as a child. He started performing at the age of 10, putting speakers in front of the family home and charging local kids five cents to hear him play drums. When he was 11, he played at the Broadmeadows Town Hall for a dancing school, and by 14 he performed three nights a week at the Bridge Hotel in Richmond.

== Career ==
Jones has played and recorded with a large cross-section of bands, musicians and orchestras. Individual collaborations include with James Morrison, John Farnham, Dragon, Don Burrows, Kate Ceberano, Tommy Emmanuel, Rhonda Burchmore, Dame Kiri Te Kanawa, Don McLean, John Denver, Stevie Wonder, Marcia Hines, Debra Byrne, Rhonda Burchmore, and Larry Adler. He has played with the Melbourne, Sydney, and Adelaide Symphony Orchestras and the Queensland Orchestra, as well as the West German Radio Big Band in Cologne, Germany.

He toured with John Farnham, and played drums in the orchestra for John Denver as well as doing a TV show with him. He toured Japan and developed a special affinity with the Orchestra Ensemble Kanazawa, where he had a piece written specially for him.

From 1984, Jones integrated his meditation practice into his compositions. He and partner Carmen Warrington have released several guided meditation CDs for ABC Music.

In 1991, then in Sydney, Jones formed AtmaSphere, a jazz ensemble with Daryl Pratt, Adam Armstrong and Dev Gopalasamy as founding members. The ensemble's music initially focused on polyrhythms, but later Carmen Warrington joined to add the spoken word, and there was another change to the lineup after Armstrong moved to New York City. The group disbanded after 2000, after Jones and Warrington had moved back to Melbourne. Jones later wrote that his time with the ensemble was "one of the most creative periods of my career".

Jones' 2008 solo album Colours of the Drum was nominated for ARIA Award for Best World Music Album.

In May 2011 he performed his first solo drum concert at a large venue, titled Energy Through Matter, at the Melbourne Recital Centre.

Jones has continued to be called on to drum for the Melbourne Symphony Orchestra, Hong Kong Philharmonic, and Orchestra Ensemble Kanazawa.

== Teaching ==
From 1985 until 1992 Jones was head of the jazz drum department at the Sydney Conservatorium.

Since 2013, Jones has been an honorary fellow and guest lecturer at Victorian College of the Arts.

He started lecturing at the James Morrison Academy of Music in 2015, and has taught private students and given workshops across Australia.

== Personal life ==
After leading quite a wild life until he was around 26, Jones discovered meditation. As of 2011, at the age of 52, Jones was living with his partner of 20 years, Carmen Warrington. They both meditated regularly, and lived a spiritual life.

== Recognition and awards ==
In 2006 the first of two drum kit concertos was written specially for him by Japanese composer Toshi Watanabe; in 2018, Melbourne's Joe Chindamo wrote another one.

In 2010, Jones received the Melbourne Prize for Music, worth $60,000, in recognition of his "lifelong contribution to the music community and recognition of his unique individual voice and musical signature". It was the first time that a drummer had won a major music prize in Australia.

Since 2013, Jones has been an honorary fellow at Victorian College of the Arts.

=== ARIA Music Awards ===
The ARIA Music Awards is an annual awards ceremony that recognises excellence, innovation, and achievement across all genres of Australian music. They commenced in 1987.

Year	Nominee / work	Award	Result	Ref.
2008	Colours of the Drum	Best World Music Album	Nominated	

== Discography ==
List of albums
Title	Album details
Colours of the Drum	Released: August 2008; Label: ABC Classics; Formats: CD
