= Breathe (New Zealand band) =

New Zealand rock band

- Origin: Wellington, New Zealand
- Years active: 1995–2001
- Spinoffs: Dead End Beat
- Past members: Andrew Tilby; Richard Small; Pet Johnson; Steve Gallagher; Guy Fisher

Breathe was a rock band from Wellington, New Zealand, consisting of Andrew Tilby (vocals, guitar), Richard Small (guitar, vocals), Pet Johnson (bass guitar), Steve Gallagher (keyboards) and Guy Fisher (drums). The band was formed in the mid-1990s by Hutt Valley school friends Small, Tilby, Fisher and Gallagher, with the addition of Johnson.

Breathe independently released a 7" single and a CD EP, Things Like These, before signing to the independent Auckland record label, Felix. In 1996, they released the Smiley Hands EP before taking a break to record their first album Pop Life, which was again released on the Felix label, with distribution through BMG. The band toured throughout New Zealand for seven months in 1998, eventually appearing as support on the Exponents Summer Tour, where their live show captured the attention of Sony Music NZ who signed the band a few weeks after its end.

Andrew Tilby won the "Tui" as Most Promising Male Vocalist at the 1999 New Zealand Music Awards.

While Breathe were signed to Sony they released their second album, Don't Stop The Revolution, in 2000. The title track, "Don't Stop The Revolution", reached number 6 in New Zealand charts while "Landslide" reached 28.

Breathe disbanded in 2001 when drummer Guy Fisher decided to leave the band. The remaining members formed Dead End Beat, who released a self-titled album in 2004.

== Discography ==
=== Albums ===
Date	Title	Label	Charted	Country	Catalog number
Albums
1998	Pop Life	Felix (through BMG)	-	-	74321 571462
2000	Don't Stop the Revolution	Sony Music	-	-	4989447.2
EPs
1995	Things Like These	Prototype Publications	-	-	PP1001-CD
1996	Smiley Hands	Felix (through BMG)	24	NZ	74321 424522

=== Singles ===
Year	Single	Album	NZ Singles Chart
1995	"Dive Tower'" (7" vinyl)	-	-
1998	"Started Something"	Pop Life	-
1998	"Drivin'"	Pop Life	-
1998	"Purple'" (Radio/TV Single only)	Pop Life	-
2000	"Landslide"	Don't Stop the Revolution	28
2000	"Don't Stop The Revolution"	Don't Stop the Revolution	6
2000	"When The Sun Comes"	Don't Stop the Revolution	-
