= Angela Davis (musician) =

Australian saxophonist

Angela Davis (born 23 June 1985) is an Australian saxophonist currently residing in Melbourne. Her first release The Art of The Melody received strong reviews in the United States and Australia and was successful on the US Jazz Charts. She is known for her pure sound reminiscent of Lee Konitz (with whom she studied), Art Pepper and Paul Desmond. Davis is a 2014 recipient of the prestigious Brian Boak Bursary in Queensland.

== Biography ==
Angela Davis grew up in Queensland, Australia. She studied at the Queensland Conservatorium under the tutelage of John Hoffman and Steve Newcomb. After graduating with first class honors, Davis went to study for a Masters of Music degree in Philadelphia, Pennsylvania. She has since moved to New York, where she plays in clubs with her own group and as a sideman.

== Discography ==
Title	Album details
The Art Of The Melody	Released: 14 May 2013; Label: Angela Davis
Lady Luck	Released: 24 March 2015; Label: Angela Davis
Little Did They Know (with Sam Anning and Tony Gould)	Released: 10 May 2019; Label: ABC Music

== Awards ==
=== AIR Awards ===
The Australian Independent Record Awards (commonly known informally as AIR Awards) is an annual awards night to recognise, promote and celebrate the success of Australia's Independent Music sector.

Year	Nominee / work	Award	Result
2020	Little Did They Know	Best Independent Jazz Album or EP	Nominated

=== ARIA Music Awards ===
The ARIA Music Awards is an annual awards ceremony that recognises excellence, innovation, and achievement across all genres of Australian music. They commenced in 1987.

Year	Nominee / work	Award	Result	Ref.
2019	Little Did They Know	Best Jazz Album	Nominated	
