= Jazzgroove Mothership Orchestra =

Australian jazz ensemble

- Origin: Australia
- Genre: Jazz
- Years active: 2003–present
- Label: Jazzgroove
- Members: Daryl Pratt; Brendan Clarke; Tom Botting; Jamie Cameron; Evan Mannell; Phil South

Jazzgroove Mothership Orchestra is an Australian large jazz ensemble. Together with Kristin Berardi they were nominated for the 2011 ARIA Award for Best Jazz Album with Kristin Berardi Meets The Jazzgroove Mothership Orchestra. The ensemble consists of Daryl Pratt (vibraphone), Brendan Clarke (contrabass), Tom Botting (contrabass), Jamie Cameron (drums, cymbals), Evan Mannell (drums), and Phil South (percussion).

== Discography ==
=== Albums ===
List of albums, with selected details
Title	Details
Dream Wheel	Released: 2007; Format: CD, Digital; Label: Birdland Records (L016)
Kristin Berardi Meets The Jazzgroove Mothership Orchestra (with Kristin Berardi)	Released: 2011; Format: CD, Digital; Label: Jazzhead (HEAD 141)
Walkabout - A Place for Visions (Music of Dave Lisik) (featuring Alex Sipiagin and Bob Sheppard)	Released: 2012; Format: CD, Digital; Label: SkyDeck Music
Fiddes vs Tinkler	Released: 2016; Format: CD, Digital; Label: Rattle Records (RAT-J-1031 2016)

== Awards and nominations ==
=== ARIA Music Awards ===
The ARIA Music Awards is an annual awards ceremony that recognises excellence, innovation, and achievement across all genres of Australian music.

Year	Nominee / work	Award	Result
2011	Kristin Berardi Meets the Jazzgroove Mothership Orchestra	Best Jazz Album	Nominated

== See also ==
- Australian jazz
