= Don't Stop the Revolution =

Studio album by Breathe
- Released: 2000
- Recorded: November 1999 – March 2000
- Studio: York Street Studios, Auckland
- Label: Columbia (Sony Music NZ)
- Producer: Malcolm Welsford

Breathe chronology
Pop Life (1998)	Don't Stop the Revolution (2000)

Don't Stop the Revolution is the second and last album by New Zealand band, Breathe, released in 2000.

== Track listing ==
1. She Said
2. Don't Stop The Revolution
3. Landslide
4. Wrapped Up
5. Sick & Tired
6. Get Yourself Together
7. When The Sun Comes
8. Perfect Fools
9. Let Them Know
10. Too Late For Salvation
11. In The City

=== Bonus Music Videos ===
1. Don't Stop the Revolution
2. When the Sun Comes

== Performers ==
- Andrew Tilby (Vocals, Guitars)
- Richard Small (Electric and Acoustic Guitars, Vocals, Piano on trk 7)
- Guy Fisher (Drums)
- Steve Gallagher (Electric Pianos, Organs, Synthesizers, Piano)
- Pet Johnson (Bass)
