= Marc Hannaford =

- Origin: Australia
- Genre: Jazz
- Occupation: Pianist
- Website: www.marchannaford.com

Marc Hannaford is an Australian jazz pianist. He was nominated for the ARIA Award for Best Jazz Album at the ARIA Music Awards of 2011 and at the AIR Awards of 2011 for Shreveport Stomp in 2011.

He was part of The Antripodean Collective with whom he released three albums.

Hannaford won the 2013 Music Council of Australia's Freedman Fellowship, the 2013 Jazz “Bell” award for most original album (Sarcophile), and the 2013 Australian Performing Rights Association's Art Award for best work (“Anda Two”).

Hannaford completed a PhD in Music Theory at Columbia University in 2019, with a dissertation on the improviser, composer, and cofounder of the Association for the Advancement of Creative Musicians, Muhal Richard Abrams. He is currently Assistant Professor of Music Theory at the University of Michigan.

He received the Society for Music Theory's Emerging Scholar Award for his article, “Fugitive music theory and George Russell's theory of tonal gravity” at the joint meeting of the American Musicological Society and the Society for Music Theory in 2023.

== Discography ==
List of albums
Title	Details
Parallels / Layers	Released: 2005; Label: Marc Hannaford; Format: DD
The Garden of Forking Paths	Released: 2007; Label: Extreme (XCD 061); Format: CD, DD
Homage with Allan Browne and Sam Anning)	Released: March 2009; Label: Jazzhead (Head107); Format: CD, DD
Polar	Released: June 2009; Label: Extreme (XCD 069); Format: CD, DD
Shreveport Stomp with Allan Browne and Sam Anning)	Released: 2011; Label: Jazzhead; Format: CD, DD
Homage with Allan Browne and Sam Anning)	Released: June 2011; Label: Jazzhead; Format: CD, DD
Sarcophile	Released: January 2012; Label: Marchon (003); Format: CD, DD
Ordinary Madness with Tim Berne, Scott Tinkler, Simon Barker and Philip Rex)	Released: 2012; Label: Marchon (002); Format: CD, DD
Faceless Dullard with Scott Tinkler and Simon Barker)	Released: August 2013; Label: Marchon (004); Format: CD, DD
Liminal	Released: September 2013; Label: Marchon; Format: DD
Faceless Dullard with Scott Tinkler and Erkki Veltheim)	Released: November 2013; Label: Marchon; Format: DD
The Vivificationists with David Tolley)	Released: February 2014; Label: Marchon; Format: DD
Can You See With Two Sets of Eyes?	Released: December 2014; Label: Marchon; Format: DD
Monday Dates with Allan Browne and Sam Pankhurst )	Released: 2018; Label: Marchon; Format: DD

== Awards and nominations ==
=== AIR Awards ===
The Australian Independent Record Awards (commonly known informally as AIR Awards) is an annual awards night to recognise, promote and celebrate the success of Australia's Independent Music sector.

Year	Nominee / work	Award	Result
2011	Shreveport Stomp	Best Independent Jazz Album	Nominated

=== ARIA Music Awards ===
The ARIA Music Awards is an annual awards ceremony held by the Australian Recording Industry Association.

Year	Nominee / work	Award	Result
2011	Shreveport Stomp	Best Jazz Album	Nominated

=== Australian Jazz Bell Awards ===
The Australian Jazz Bell Awards, (also known as the Bell Awards or The Bells), are annual music awards for the jazz music genre in Australia. They commenced in 2003.

Year	Nominee / work	Award	Result
2010	Homage – Sam Anning, Allan Browne, Marc Hannaford	Best Australian Classic Jazz Album	Won
2013	Sacrophile – Marc Hannaford	Most Original Australian Jazz Album	Won

- wins only
