= Chris Ludowyk =

Australian traditional jazz band leader

Chris Ludowyk (born 6 March 1944) is a jazz trombonist and bandleader in Melbourne, Victoria. His band, the Society Syncopators, was known for their "good humour, rollicking music and audience response", and as a favorite of Graeme Bell.

== History ==
Ludowyk was born in Sri Lanka and emigrated to Australia as a child, in 1962 moving with his family to Geelong, where he became involved in the thriving jazz scene, playing trombone with the Crescent city Jazz Band from 1964, the Green Horse Jazz Band from 1965 and the Baton Rouge Jazz Band from 1966. He moved to Melbourne in 1968 and joined the New Harlem Jazz Band, in 1979 succeeding Ian Smith as leader. The lineup was then Ludowyk leader and trombone; Bob Gilbert on reeds, Sandro Donati on trumpet, Neil Orchard, piano, Mauri Dann on banjo, Bill Morris on tuba, and Bob Wood on drums. By the time they recorded New Harlem Live Before a Recorded Audience, Chris Farley had taken over banjo and Richard Opat on drums.

He formed the Prahran Market Jazz Band in 1980.

In 1984 he founded "Chris Ludowyk's Society Syncopators", featuring Cal Duffy on drums and Peter Gaudion on trumpet, playing at the Abbey Jazz Cellar, (Note: Some confusion exists here: in 1979 New Harlem was playing at Athols Abbey in St Kilda) which later that year closed due to the building's impending demolition. They then moved to the Emerald Hotel in South Melbourne.

Renamed The Syncopators, the band released several albums with leader Ludowyk on trombone and vocals, Peter Gaudion on trumpet and vocals, Richard Miller (previously with The Red Onion Jazz Band) on reeds and vocals, Stephen Grant on piano, James Clark on bass and tuba and Rod Gilbert on drums, also vocals.
