= Things Like These =

EP by Breathe
- Released: 1995
- Recorded: November 1994–February 1995
- Studio: Marmalade, Wellington
- Producer: Phil Knight

Breathe chronology
Things Like These (1995)	Pop Life (1998)

Things Like These is an EP by New Zealand band Breathe, released in 1995.

== Track listing ==
1. Prayer
2. White
3. All I Know
4. Candy Girl
5. Dive Tower

== Performers ==
- Guy Fisher (Drums, Percussion)
- Pet Johnson (Bass Guitar)
- Steve Gallagher (Keyboards, Sampler)
- Richard Small (Guitars)
- Andrew Tilby (Vocals, Guitars)

with

- Garth Russell (Clarinet on Trks 1,2)
