= Pop Life (Breathe album) =

Studio album by Breathe
- Released: 1998
- Recorded: Matrix Digital Studios, Wellington, New Zealand, 1997–1998
- Length: 42:30
- Label: Felix (through BMG)
- Producer: Nigel Stanford

Breathe chronology
Things Like These (1995)	Pop Life (1998)	Don't Stop The Revolution (2000)

Pop Life is the debut album of New Zealand band, Breathe released in 1998.

== Track listing ==
1. Smiley Hands
2. Drivin'
3. Burst
4. Get To You
5. Fall
6. Purple
7. Going Down
8. Not Now
9. Started Something
10. Burnt By The Sun
11. Pet Tortoise

== Performers ==
- Guy Fisher (Drums)
- Steve Gallagher (Keyboards, Sampler)
- Pet Johnson (Bass Guitar)
- Richard Small (Guitars, vocals on "Not Now")
- Andrew Tilby (Vocals, Guitars)
