= Judy Jacques =

Australian singer

Judy Jacques (born 1944) is an Australian singer and TV presenter. Jacques is now predominantly a Jazz singer but has also performed gospel and folk.

Jacques career began at age 11 singing on Radio 3AW. She joined the Yarra Yarra Jazz Band at 15. In 1963 the then 19 year old became a regular on GTV-9's In Melbourne Tonight show. Alongside Idris Jones she hosted Start Living on ABC TV. Over the years she has fronted the Judy Jacques Quintet, the Judy Jacques Sextet, Lighthouse the Yellow Dog Band and the Gospel Four.

== Discography ==
- Going For A Song (1997)
- Making Wings (2002) - with Lighthouse
- The Sixties Sessions (2016) - Compilation featuring The Yarra Yarra New Orleans Jazz Band and The Gospel Four.
- "What Can I Do Lord" (1965) - Lombard Records (split with The Idlers Five)
- "Since You're Gone" (1966) - Astor
- "Somewhere In The World" (1967) - Astor

Yarra Yarra New Orleans Jazz Band with Judy Jacques

- "Jazz As You Like It At City Hall" Volume 1 (1964) - Crest Record Co
- "Volume 1" (1962) - Crest Record Co
- "Volume 2" (1962) - Crest Record Co

Judy Jacques And Her Gospel Four

- "Judy Jacques And Her Gospel Four" (1963) - Crest Record Co
- "Be My Friend" (1964) - Crest Record Co
