= Kristin Berardi =

Australian singer (born 1981)

- Born: 1981 (age 44–45); Koumala, Queensland, Australia
- Genre: Jazz
- Occupation: Singer

Kristin Berardi, who originates from Koumala, Queensland, is an Australian jazz singer. Her album with the Jazzgroove Mothership Orchestra, Kristin Berardi Meets the Jazzgroove Mothership Orchestra, was nominated for Best Jazz Album at the ARIA Music Awards of 2011.

She won the International Vocal Competition of the Montreux Jazz Festival in 2006.

Berardi's version of "Strangers in the Night" was used as background music in a television advertisement for Audi automobiles in 2020.

== Discography ==
=== Studio albums ===
Title	Details
Kristin Berardi & James Sherlock (with James Sherlock)	Released: 2006; Label: Pinnacles Music (PM0306); Format: CD, digital download
The Kristin Berardi Band (as The Kristin Berardi Band)	Released: 2008; Label: Jazzhead (HEAD093); Format: CD, digital download
If You Were There (with James Sherlock)	Released: 2009; Label: Format: CD, digital download
Kristin Berardi Meets the Jazzgroove Mothership Orchestra (with the Jazzgroove Mothership Orchestra)	Released: 2011; Label: Jazzhead (HEAD 141); Format: CD, digital download
Guess I'll Hang My Tears Out (with James Sherlock)	Released: February 2014; Label: Format: CD, digital download
Where or When	Released: 2 October 2015; Label: ABC Jazz (475 9263); Format: CD, digital download
Hope in My Pocket (with Sean Foran & Rafael Karlen)	Released: 2 October 2015; Label: Format: CD, digital download
Just As You Are (as The Kristin Berardi Band)	Released: March 2016; Label: Format: CD, digital download
Our Songs, Not Songs (with Sam Anning)	Released: September 2019; Label: Earshift Music; Format: CD, digital download
Haven (with Sean Foran & Rafael Karlen featuring Pascal Schumacher)	Released: November 2020; Label: Earshift Music (EAR029); Format: CD, digital download

=== Albums (as featured artist) ===
Title	Details
Swallows & Swans (As Florian Ross Quintet featuring Kristin Berardi)	Released: 2018; Label: Toy Piano Records (TPR 201801); Format: CD, digital download

== Awards ==
=== ARIA Music Awards ===
The ARIA Music Awards is an annual awards ceremony that recognises excellence, innovation, and achievement across all genres of Australian music.

Year	Nominee / work	Award	Result
2011	Kristin Berardi Meets the Jazzgroove Mothership Orchestra	Best Jazz Album	Nominated

=== Queensland Music Awards ===
The Queensland Music Awards (previously known as Q Song Awards) are annual awards celebrating Queensland, Australia's brightest emerging artists and established legends. They commenced in 2006.

Year	Nominee / work	Award	Result (wins only)
2016	"Hope in My Pocket" (with Sean Foran & Rafael Karlen)	Jazz Award	Won
2021	"Falling" (with Danny Widdicombe and Trichotomy)	Jazz Award	Won
