= Steve Barry (musician) =

Australian musician

- Born: New Zealand
- Genres: Jazz
- Occupation(s): Pianist, composer
- Website: www.stevebarrymusic.com

Steve Barry is a New Zealand born jazz pianist and composer. He is the Program Leader for Jazz at the Sydney Conservatorium of Music at the University of Sydney. His album In the Waves with USA drummer Eric Harland received favourable coverage in the UK jazz magazine Jazzwise where Barry's music was described as "steeped in the harmonic rigours and free-flowing discipline of well-executed contemporary narrative jazz". He has also received positive notice at Australianjazz.net and in the Sydney Morning Herald, which praised In the Waves as “...the finest instalment to date of the pianist’s bristling musical intelligence, rhythmic mutability, melodic flair and compositional gifts.”

== Discography ==
Title	Details
Self-titled	Released: 2012
Orbiturtle: Sakura	Released: 2015
Blueprints & Vignettes	Released: 2018
Hatch	Released: 2018
Orbiturtle: Joganji	Released: 2018
Polyglot: Talk, Vol. 1	Released: 2020
Green Thumbs	Released: 2021
In the Waves	Released: 2023

== Awards and nominations ==
=== Australian Jazz Bell Awards ===
The Australian Jazz Bell Awards acknowledge excellence in Australian Jazz.

Year	Category	Result	Ref.
2013	Bell Award for Young Australian Jazz Artist of the Year	Won	

=== APRA Professional Development Award ===
The APRA Professional Development Awards provide support to emerging songwriters and composers.

Year	Category	Result	Ref.
2021	Jazz/Improvised Music	Won	
