= Andrea Keller Quartet =

Australian jazz quartet

- Origin: Victoria, Australia
- Genre: Jazz
- Years active: 1999–present
- Members: Andrea Keller; Eugene Ball; Ian Whitehurst; Joe Talia
- Past members: Matt Clohesy; Danny Fischer; Dave Beck

Andrea Keller Quartet are an Australian jazz quartet fronted by Andrea Keller. Originally formed in 1999 as a quintet they released their first album Thirteen Sketches in 2001. It won the ARIA Award for Best Jazz Album in 2002 (credited to Andrea Keller). They also received nominations for the same award in 2005 (Angels and Rascals), 2007 (Little Claps) and 2014 (Wave Rider).

== Members ==
- Andrea Keller - Piano
- Eugene Ball - Trumpet
- Ian Whitehurst - Tenor saxophone
- Joe Talia - Drums

== Discography ==
The Andrea Keller Quintet

- Thirteen Sketches (2001)

Andrea Keller Quartet

- Angels and Rascals (2004)
- Little Claps (2007)
- Galumphing 'Round the Nation (2009)
- Andrea Keller Quartet Greatest Hits (2016)

Andrea Keller Quartet with Strings

- Wave Rider (2014) - Jazzhead
