= Bennetts Lane Big Band =

The Bennetts Lane Big Band is an Australian large ensemble band playing jazz compositions and improvisations that was formed in 2001 to provide an avenue for original new work.

Three musicians, Eugene Ball, Andrea Keller and Nick Haywood were approached by the management of Bennetts Lane Jazz Club to form the group. An 11 piece group was formed and the band has performed on a regular monthly basis from 2001 to 2008.

The Bennetts Lane Big Band performed the award-winning jazz composition by Eugene Ball, Fool Poet's Portion suite, at a benefit concert for the Melbourne Jazz Co-op in January 2008.

== The Snip ==
The band recorded an album of original compositions in May 2002 on the ABC Jazz label called The Snip.
