= Barney McAll =

Australian-American jazz pianist and composer

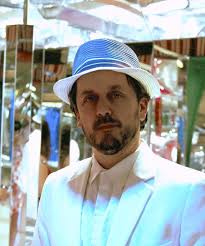
- McAll in New York City

Background information
- Born: Barnaby Jonathan McAll; January 3, 1966 (age 60); Melbourne, Australia
- Genre: Jazz
- Occupations: Musician, composer, arranger
- Instruments: Piano, keyboards, bulbul tarang
- Labels: ABC Classics; Jazzhead; Transparent Music; Extra Celestial Arts
- Website: barneymcall.com

Barney McAll (born January 3, 1966) is an Australian jazz pianist, composer, arranger and record producer. He joined American saxophinist Gary Bartz's in 1997 and has performed and recorded internationally with musicians including Kurt Rosenwinkel, Fred Wesley and the JBs, Groove Collective, Dewey Redman, Roy Ayers, Maceo Parker and Jimmy Cobb. He has released numerous albums as a bandleader, appeared on more than 100 recordings as a side person, and composed music for film and television. His 2015 album "Mooroolbark" won the ARIA award for best Album.

== Early life and education ==
McAll was born in Melbourne, Australia, and grew up in a musical household. His early exposure to jazz came partly through family friends, including drummer Len Barnard, who introduced him to recordings by musicians such as Bessie Smith and Pinetop Smith. Family gatherings often included piano playing and singalongs of jazz standards. His brother John also pursued music as a pianist.

As a teenager, McAll attended a performance by Brazilian musicians Egberto Gismonti and Nana Vasconcelos at the Basement in Sydney, an experience he later identified as influential in shaping his approach to music and composition.

From 1985 to 1989, McAll studied at the Victorian College of the Arts (VCA), University of Melbourne, completing a Bachelor of Music. During this period, he studied with pianist Mike Nock. He subsequently undertook private studies in New York with jazz pianists Barry Harris and Mulgrew Miller, and studied in Cuba with pianist Chucho Valdés.

== Solo career and musical projects ==
Alongside his work as a collaborator, McAll developed a career as a bandleader, composer and recording artist. His projects have explored a range of musical styles, combining jazz improvisation with elements of soul, electronic music, experimental composition and contemporary production.

His early albums as a leader included Exit (1996), Widening Circles (1998), Release the Day (2000) and Mother of Dreams and Secrets (2005). The latter featured saxophonist Billy Harper and guitarist Kurt Rosenwinkel and reflected the influence of McAll's musical experiences in New York and Cuba.

McAll developed several ensembles and recording projects, including M.O.D.A.S. (Mother of Dreams and Secrets), GRAFT and Sylent Running. These projects explored different approaches to ensemble improvisation, composition and electronic sound. His album Graft was released in 2012, while Sylent Running brought together vocalist Gian Slater and electric bassist Chris Hale in a project combining improvisation and experimental composition.

In 2015, McAll released Mooroolbark, which received the ARIA Award for Best Jazz Album. Subsequent projects included Hearing the Blood (2017), Zephyrix (2018), recorded with the Monash Art Ensemble, and Global Intimacy (2018), released under the name TQX. The latter incorporated electronic production and contributions from vocalists including Sia and Daniel Merriweather.

In 2022, McAll released Precious Energy, featuring saxophonist Gary Bartz and musicians associated with the Australian group Hiatus Kaiyote. The album was nominated for the ARIA Award for Best Jazz Album and was included in AllMusic's Best of 2022 selections.

== Other activities ==
McAll curated the APRA AMCOS Art Music Awards from 2019 to 2023.

Barney authored a book titled As The Flow Cries – 365 Music Maxims, which presents 365 insights into music drawn from his experience touring and exploring the world of improvised music.

== Recognition and awards ==
- 1990: Winner, Jazz Piano Award at the Wangaratta Festival Of Jazz
- 1998: Best Jazz Composition Award from NSW Jazz Action society
- 2007–2008: Australia Council Fellowship
- 2015: Peggy Glanville-Hicks composer residency in Sydney

At the ARIA Music Awards of 2015 McAll won Best Jazz Album for Mooroolbark.

=== AIR Awards ===
The Australian Independent Record Awards (commonly known informally as AIR Awards) is an annual awards night to recognize, promote and celebrate the success of Australia's Independent Music sector.

Year	Nominee / work	Award	Result	Ref.
2012	Graft	Best Independent Jazz Album	Nominated	
2015	Mooroolbark	Best Independent Jazz Album	Won	
2023	Precious Energy	Best Independent Jazz Album or EP	Nominated	

=== APRA Awards ===
The APRA Awards are held in Australia and New Zealand by the Australasian Performing Right Association to recognise songwriting skills, sales and airplay performance by its members annually.

Year	Nominee / work	Award	Result
1993	"Hindered On His Way to Heaven" (with Vince Jones)	Best Jazz Composition	Won

=== ARIA Music Awards ===
The ARIA Music Awards is an annual awards ceremony that recognises excellence, innovation, and achievement across all genres of Australian music. They commenced in 1987.

Year	Nominee / work	Award	Result	Ref.
1996	Exit	Best Jazz Album	Nominated	
2012	Graft	Best Jazz Album	Nominated	
2015	Mooroolbark	Best Jazz Album	Won	
2018	Hearing the Blood	Best Jazz Album	Nominated	
2019	Zephyrix	Best Jazz Album	Nominated	
2022	Precious Energy	Best Jazz Album	Nominated	

=== Art Music Awards ===
The Art Music Awards are presented each year by the Australasian Performing Right Association (APRA) and the Australian Music Centre (AMC) to recognise achievement in the composition, performance, education and presentation of Australian music. Art music covers activity across contemporary classical music, contemporary jazz and improvised music, experimental music and sound art.

Year	Nominee / work	Award	Result
2018	Hearing The Blood	Excellence in Jazz	Nominated

=== Australian Jazz Bell Awards ===
The Australian Jazz Bell Awards (also known as the Bell Awards or The Bells), are annual music awards for the jazz music genre in Australia.

Year	Nominee / work	Award	Result	Ref.
2006	Mother of Dreams And Secrets	Best Jazz Album	Nominated	
2010	"Flashback"	Best Jazz Song	Nominated	
2010	Flashbacks	Best Contemporary Jazz Album	Nominated	
2012	"Nostalgia for the Present"	Best Jazz Song	Nominated	
2012	Graft	Best Contemporary Jazz Album	Nominated	
2014	TRIO FERAL: DONT FEED	Best Contemporary Jazz Album	Nominated	
2016	"ASIO"	Best Ensemble	Nominated	
2016	Mooroolbark	Best Jazz Album	Won	
2016	"Nectar Spur"	Best Jazz Song	Won	
2017	ASIO	Best Ensemble	Won	
2017	Hearing the Blood	Best Album	Won	
2017	Hearing the Blood	Best Produced Album	Won	
2017	"Love Is The Blood"	Best Jazz Song	Nominated	
2019	Zephyrix	Best Instrumental Jazz Album	Nominated	
2019	Zephyrix	Best Produced Album	Won	

=== Australian Music Prize ===
Year	Nominee / work	Award	Result
2018	Zephyrix	Best Album	Nominated
2022	Precious Energy	Best Album	Nominated

=== Grammy Awards ===
The Grammy Award (stylized as GRAMMY, originally called Gramophone Award), or just Grammy, is an award presented by the Recording Academy to recognize "Outstanding Achievement in the music industry" of the United States.

Year	Nominee / work	Award	Result
2007	People People, Music Music	Best Independent Jazz Album (With Groove Collective)	Nominated

=== Music Victoria Awards ===
The Music Victoria Awards are an annual awards night celebrating Victorian music. They commenced in 2006.

Year	Nominee / work	Award	Result	Ref.
2015	Mooroolbark	Best Jazz Album	Won	
2018	Hearing The Blood	Best Jazz Album	Nominated	
2022	Precious Energy	Best Jazz Work	Won	

== Discography ==
=== Albums ===
List of albums with selected details
Title	Details
Exit (ft. Jimmy Cob & Vincent Herring)	Released: 1995; Format: CD; Label: ABC Jazz (4798192)
Widening Circles (ft. Billy Harper, Ben Monder, Vincent Herring)	Released: 1998; Format: CD; Label: AIJA Recording (009)
Release the Day (ft. Gary Bartz, Kurt Rosenwinkel & Joey Baron)	Released: 2000; Format: CD; Label: Jazzhead
Vivid (with Badal Roy & Rufus Cappadocia)	Released: 2005; Format: CD, Digital; Label: Jazzhead (HEAD065)
Mother of Dreams and Secrets ' (ft. Kurt Rosenwinkel & Billy Harper)	Released: 2005; Format: CD, Digital; Label: Jazzhead (HEAD066)
Baby Winter (with Genji Siraisi)	Released: 2005; Format: CD, Digital; Label: KUFALA Recordings (KUF0129)
Flashbacks (ft. Kurt Rosenwinkel)	Released: 2009; Format: Digital; Label: Barney McAll
Blueprints	Released: 2011; Format: CD, Digital; Label: Jazzhead (HEAD113)
Recollections	Released: 2011; Format: CD, Digital; Label: Jazzhead (HEAD113)
Graft	Released: 2012; Format: CD, Digital; Label: Jazzhead (HEAD146)
Chucky Vol.1Swirl Cauldron Swirl	Released: 2013; Format: CD, Digital; Label: Extra Celestial Arts
Solo Piano Live	Released: 2013; Format: CD, Digital; Label: Extra Celestial Arts
Mooroolbark	Released: 2015; Format: CD, Digital; Label: ABC Jazz (473 1260)
Nourriture De L'Amour	Released: 2015; Format: Digital; Label: Extra Celestial Arts
Hearing the Blood	Released: October 2017; Format: CD, Digital; Label: Extra Celestial Arts
Zephyrix (with The Monash Art Ensemble)	Released: 2018; Format: CD, Digital; Label: Extra Celestial Arts
An Extra Celestial Christmas	Released: December 2019; Format: CD, Digital; Label: Extra Celestial Arts
Lockdown Hard Drive Pearl Dive	Released: December 2020; Format: Digital; Label: Extra Celestial Arts
Third Wing (with Robert Vincs)	Released: June 2020; Format: CD, Digital; Label: Extra Celestial Arts
Transitive Cycles	Released: August 2021; Format: LP; Label: Heavy Machinery Records (HEVMAC009)
Precious Energy (ft. Gary Bartz & Hiatus Kaiyote)	Released: 2022; Format: LP, Digital; Label: Extra Celestial Arts (ExtraArts 004)
Precious Energy Re-Up (ft. Gary Bartz, Steve Spacek, Hiatus Kaiyote, Sampology)	Released: 2023; Format: Digital; Label: Extra Celestial Arts (ExtraArts 005)
Piano Memoirs from Peggy Glanville-Hicks House	Released: 2023; Format: Digital; Label: Extra Celestial Arts (ExtraArts 006)
Emerald Hands	Released: 2023; Format: Vinyl LP; Label: Extra Celestial Arts (ExtraArts 007)
MonK KnoW : Explorations Of Thelonious Monk	Released: 2026; Format: Digital (Bandcamp Only); Label: Extra Celestial Arts (ExtraArts 008)

=== Albums as a Sideman ===
- 1993 – Vince Jones – It All Ends Up in Tears
- 1993 – Bill Ware – Groove Thing (Eight Ball)
- 1994 – Kate Ceberano and Friends – ABC
- 1996 – Vince Jones – Trustworthy Little Sweethearts
- 1996 – Dale Barlow – Dale Barlow
- 1997 – Vince Jones – Future Girl
- 1997 – Tim Rollinson – Cause + Effect Mercury Records
- 1997 – Jack Lee – Poong-Un – Nuevo
- 1998 – Vince Jones – Here's to the Miracles
- 1998 – Slave Pianos – A Diagnosis Revolver Records
- 1999 – David Rex – Collision Course
- 1999 – Vince Jones – Virtue
- 1999 – The Whitlams – Love This City
- 1999 – Groove Collective – Declassified (Shanachie)
- 1999 – Gary Bartz – Live at the Jazz Standard
- 2000 – Phil Stack – Lucky You
- 2000 – LIVE and Hard to Find Groove Collective
- 2000 – Richard Worth – Rise (Giant Step)
- 2000 – DET Live! Vol. 2: Exclusive Live Performances from WDET-FM 101.9 Detroit
- 2001 – Vincent Herring – Save The World
- 2001 – Ron Trent
- 2001 – Groove Collective – Giant Step Record Sessions Vol.1 (Shanachie)
- 2001 – Groove Collective– It's All in Your Mind (Shanachie)
- 2002 – Groove Collective – Live And Hard To Find (live album) (Kufala Records)
- 2002 – Gary Bartz – Live at the Jazz Standard Vol 2
- 2002 – Ron Trent – Musical Reflections
- 2002 – Wangaratta Live – Jazzhead
- 2002 – Groove Collective – Brooklyn, NY 04.20.02 (live album) (Kufala Records)
- 2003 – Red Lotus – Make Way
- 2003 – Greg Gonzales – X=X
- 2003 – Jacam Manricks – Skies the Limit
- 2003 – Greta Gertler – The Baby That Brought Bad Weather
- 2004 – Jay Rodriguez and Ron Trent Olájopé – Batidos
- 2004 – DJ Jazzy Jeff – In The House
- 2004 – Fred Wesley and The JB's – Wuda Cuda Shuda
- 2004 – Paul Williamson's Hammond Combo – A Month Of Mondays
- 2005 – The Modern Congress – The Hidden Soul of Harmony (Casa Del Discos)
- 2005 – Fabio Morgera – The Voice Within
- 2005 – The Jay Collins Band – Poem For You Today
- 2006 – Jazzhead2006 – Jazzhead records compilation
- 2006 – Josh Roseman – 'Treats for the Night Walker
- 2006 – Groove Collective – People People Music Music Savoy Records
- 2006 – Greta Gertler – Pecadillo vocal feature "i'm not a lizard"
- 2006 – Ayla Napa Valley – Finest Ambient Tunes
- 2008 – Jazzhead – Jazzhead Vol 7.
- 2008 – Pamela Luss – Magnet
- 2007 – Groove Collective – PS1 Warm Up:Brooklyn, NY, 2 July 2005 (live album) (Kufala)
- 2007 – Umberto Echo – Dub Trail
- 2007 – Jojo Kuo – No Kelen Kelen – Goin Native Records
- 2008 – Josh Roseman – Constellations: live in Vienna (ENJA)
- 2008 – Jo Lawry – I Want To be Happy
- 2009 – Jonathan Zwartz – The Sea
- 2009 – Julien Wilson / Steve Magnusson – Kaleidoscopic (Jazzhead)
- 2009 – Sa-Ra – Nuclear Evolution: The Age of Love
- 2010 – Umberto Echo – Dub the World
- 2010 – Rebecca Barnard – Everlasting
- 2010 – Blue Six – Noesis
- 2010 – Tom Browne – S'Up (Pony Canyon)
- 2010 – Sia – iTunes – Live in Sydney
- 2011 – Andy Bey – Companions Of The Lost Ark – ILM Recordings
- 2012 – Jazzhead12 – Jazzhead Records
- 2012 – Gary Bartz – Coltrane Rules: Tao of a Music Warrior (OYO Records)
- 2012 – Tim Rollinson – The Protagonist (The Modern Congress)
- 2012 – Brad Jones – Avant Lounge (Ropeadope Records)
- 2012 – Tim Clarkson – Evolution Of Beauty – Dangerous Music Records
- 2012 – The Universal Thump – The Universal Thump
- 2013 – Jonathan Zwartz – The Remembering and Forgetting Of The Air
- 2013 – Julien Wilson – This Is Always ( Lionshare Records)
- 2014 – Gary Bartz – Coltrane Rules: Tao of a Music Warrior Volume 2 (OYO Records)
- 2014 – Sparkler – Peter Apfelbaum – I Colored It In For You EP M.O.D. Technologies Bill Laswell
- 2014 – Aaron Comess – Aaron Comess Quintet
- 2015 – Julien Wilson – This Narrow Isthmus ( Lionshare Records)
- 2016 – Alice Bierhorst – The Beacon
- 2016 – Umberto Echo – Elevator Dubs
- 2016 – Jazztrack – Celebrating 40 Years – ABC
- 2017 – Sara Valenzuela – Fulgor
- 2018 – John Wesley Harding – Greatest Other Peoples Hits
- 2018 – Mike Rivett Quartet – Live At Cottage Point
- 2018 – Jonathan Zwartz – Animarum
- 2019 – Kian – Bliss – EMI Music
- 2019 – Laneous – Monstera Deliciosa- Soul Has No Tempo
- 2019 – Michael Jordan – AIM
- 2019 – How Much Is the Robot – Analog Bass Camp
- 2019 – The Art Of Fighting – Luna Low
- 2020 – Daniel Merriweather – "Rain" – (Rain Recordings)
- 2020 – Jazz 100 selected Highlights – ABC
- 2020 – Third Wing (with Rob Vincs)
- 2020 – MIJF – These Digital Times Compilation
- 2021 – Martha Marlow – Dont Want To Grow Up
- 2021 – Gian Slater – Grey Is Ground
- 2021 – Dewey Redman – Live In Chicago (Extracelestial Arts)
- 2021 – Billy Harper Quartet – Live In Brooklyn (Extracelestial Arts)
- 2023 – Jay Rodriegiez Sierra – Muthaflower (Jay Rodriguez Sierra)
- 2023 – Emma Donovan – Til My Song Is Done
- 2025 – Gary Bartz – Damage Control
- 2026 – Daniel Merriweather – New Sincerity (A New Dawn)
- 2026 - Budjerah – Gentleman (Sony)

=== Collaborator ===
- 1998 – Jonathan Zwartz, Hamish Stuart, Barney McAll – Zeeks Beek ABC/EMI
- 2005 – Jody Watley, Ron Trent, Barney McAll – Saturday Night Experience
- 2005 – Barney McAll, Genji Siraisi – Baby Winter
- 2006 – Barney McAll, Badal Roy, Rufus Cappadocia – Vivid
- 2008 – George Schuller, Barney McAll, Matt Pavolka – That Trio This
- 2009 – Sylent Running – Empathy Chip
- 2014 – Trio Feral – Don't Feed
- 2020 – Seven Wonders Compilation – Wondercore Island/Plug Seven
- 2020 – WatArtists Compilation – At Clouds Length
- 2020 – Third Wing (with Rob Vincs)
- 2021 – Sex On Toast – Take Your Mask Off
- 2022 – King Gizzard And The Lizard Wizard – Omnium Gatherum
- 2025 – Gary Bartz – Damage Control

=== Arranger ===
- 1996 – Vince Jones – Trustworthy Little Sweethearts
- 1997 – Vince Jones – Future Girl
- 1998 – Vince Jones – Here's to the Miracles
- 1999 – Vince Jones – Virtue
- 2000 – Vince Jones – Live
- 2006 – Pamela Luss – There's Something About You I Don't Know
- 2007 – Pamela Luss – Your Eyes
- 2008 – Pamela Luss – Magnet
- 2008 – Paulette McWilliams – Flow
- 2010 – Tom Scott with Paulette McWilliams – Telling Stories
- 2010 – Rebecca Barnard – Everlasting
- 2025 – Gary Bartz – Damage Control
- 2026– Daniel Merriweather – New Sincerity (A New Dawn)

=== Producer ===
- 1997 – Vince Jones – Future Girl
- 1998 – Vince Jones – Here's to the Miracles
- 2006 – Barney McAll, Badal Roy, Rufus Cappadocia – Vivid
- 2009 – Jacam Manricks – Labyrinths (co-producer)
- 2009 – Sylent Running – Empathy Chip
- 2010 – Rebecca Barnard – Everlasting (co-producer)
- 2012 – Brad Jones – Avant Lounge (Ropeadope Records) (co-producer)
- 2018 – Global Intimacy – TQX (Extra Celestial Arts)
- 2019 – Michael Jordan – AIM (co-producer)
- 2019 – An Extra Celestial Christmas –(Extra Celestial Arts)
- 2020 – Daniel Merriweather – "Rain" – (Rain Recordings) (co-producer)
- 2021 – Gian Slater – Grey Is Ground
- 2021 – Sex On Toast – Take Your Mask Off (Co-Producer, Co-Composer)
- 2022 – Precious Energy – (Extra Celestial Arts)
- 2026 – Daniel Merriweather – New Sincerity – (New Dawn)

=== Solo albums producer ===
- 1996 – Exit (Jazzhead)
- 2000 – Release the Day (Transparent Music/Jazzhead)
- 2005 – Mother of Dreams and Secrets (Jazzhead)
- 2009 – Flashbacks (Extracelestial Arts)
- 2011 – Blueprints (Jazzhead)
- 2011 – Recollections – Best Of (Jazzhead)
- 2012 – Graft (Jazzhead)
- 2013 – Swirl Cauldron Swirl (Extra Celestial Arts)
- 2013 – Solo Piano Live (Extra Celestial Arts)
- 2015 – Mooroolbark (ABC Jazz)
- 2017 – Hearing The Blood (Extra Celestial Arts)
- 2018 – Zephyrix with Monash Art Ensemble (Extra Celestial Arts)
- 2018 – Global Intimacy – TQX (Extra Celestial Arts)
- 2022 – Precious Energy – (Extra Celestial Arts)

=== Film scores ===
- The Forgotten Australians – SBS Broadcasting Group
- Pushing The Elephant – PBS
- The Position – Second Act Films
- We All Fall Down – The American Mortgage Crisis
- Overhere – Documentary – Reelworks/ Chanel Thirteen
- Bayshore – A Small Piece of The World
- Water Flowing Together – Gwendolen Cates/ PBS
- I Am Ahmed Ahmed
- Motherland Afghanistan – Aubin Pictures/ Independent Lens
- Hide and Seek – 20th Century Fox
- Kathy Griffin – Kathy Griffin: My Life on the D-List
- Face Value
- Sacco and Vanzetti – Documentary by Peter Miller/ Ken Burns Florentine Films
- Peter Berner's Loaded Brush – Australian Broadcasting Corporation
- Liberia: An Uncivil War – Discovery/Times
- Brother to Brother – Rodney Evans- Independent Lens
- Freaks Like Me – Giraffe Partners
- Solstice
- Homecoming- Edwina Throsby
- Otto and Lumilla – John C Williams
- Necesidades- Fernando de France
- Facing The Dragon- Sedika Mojadidi
- Gertie's Law – Supreme Court Podcast

=== Compositional works ===
- 1993 "Diminuet" Exploring the possibilities of the miniature (La Mama, Carlton, VIC)
- 1999 ¡¡EMANCIPATE THE DISSONANCE!! with Slave Pianos (Lombard-Freid Fine Arts NYC)
- 2004 Two lives in flux – and vice versa Vilnius, Lithuania
- 2009 "Vanishing Point" collaboration with video artist Janet Biggs (Claire Oliver Gallery NYC)
- 2015 "The Unanswered Question (once touched, remains unknown) " The University of Houston Choral Chorale Choir with Janet Biggs
- 2016 Zephyrix – Monash Art Ensemble
- 2016 Transitive Cycles – Federation Bells Commission, City Of Melbourne
- 2017 "Attrocity Slave" – Slave Pianos – Moscow Stations / Last Stop East – Part II – Continent of Sorrow
- 2018 "Trilogy Of Cycles" – Federation Bells Commission, City Of Melbourne
- 1999 ¡¡EMANCIPATE THE DISSONANCE!! with Slave Pianos (Lombard-Freid Fine Arts NYC)
- 2004 Two lives in flux – and vice versa Vilnius, Lithuania
- 2009 "Vanishing Point" collaboration with video artist Janet Biggs (Claire Oliver Gallery NYC)
- 2015 "The Unanswered Question" for UH Chorale Choir with Janet Biggs
- 2015 ZEPHYRIX for Monash Art Ensemble
