= Andrea Keller =

Australian pianist and composer (born 1973)

- Born: 1973 (age 52–53); Australia
- Genres: Jazz
- Occupations: Musician, educator, composer
- Instrument: Piano
- Years active: 1997–present
- Labels: Jazzhead, ABC Music
- Website: andreakellermusician.com

Andrea Keller (born 1973) is an Australian pianist and composer. She won three ARIA Award for Best Jazz Album with Thirteen Sketches, Mikrokosmos and Footprints and was nominated in 2013 for the album Family Portraits.

== Biography ==
Born to Czech parents in 1973, Keller grew up in Sydney.

Convinced from a young age that she would be a musician, she studied piano, flute and saxophone at Sydney's Conservatorium High School. Inspired by her older brother, she penned her first compositions at the age of 10, and received her Associate in Music diploma with distinction on piano at age 14. It was around this time that she was introduced to jazz music and the art of improvisation.

Continuing to explore classical, jazz and original musics throughout her teenage years, her musical path became more defined when she moved to Melbourne in 1993 to attend the Victorian College of the Arts (VCA).

Since 1996 Keller has been an active educator in Melbourne's tertiary jazz and improvisation departments, including the faculty of the VCA and Melbourne Conservatorium of Music, University of Melbourne, Monash University and Melbourne Polytechnic (formerly NMIT). In 1999, Keller founded the Andrea Keller Quintet, which later became the Andrea Keller Quartet. She also co-founded the Bennetts Lane Big Band.She plays piano for the Australian Art Orchestra. Keller wrote her doctoral thesis at the Sydney Conservatorium of Music about the Estonian composer Arvo Pärt.

In 2017 Keller was awarded the Merlyn Myer Music Commission from the Melbourne Recital Centre.

== Discography ==
=== Albums ===
Title	Details
Icedreaming (with Anita Hustas as Hustas-Keller)	Released: 2000; Label: Newmarket (NEW3070.2)
Thirteen Sketches (as The Andrea Keller Quintet)	Released: 2001; Label: Newmarket (NEW3081.2)
Mikrokosmos (arrangement of a selection from Mikrokosmos, with The Bartók Project)	Released: March 2002; Label: ABC Jazz (4766238)
Angels and Rascals (as Andrea Keller Quartet)	Released: 2005; Label: ABC Jazz (9828385)
Live at the Edge (with Tamara Murphy)	Released: August 2006; Label: ABC Jazz
Little Claps (as Andrea Keller Quartet)	Released: August 2007; Label: Jazzhead (HEAD083)
Footprints: The Wayne Shorter Project	Released: November 2007; Label: ABC
Hush Collection: A Castle for All	Released: February 2008; Label: Hush Music Foundation (HUSH 008)
Carried by the Sun (with Tamara Murphy, Allan Browne)	Released: 2008; Label: Jazzhead (HEAD072)
Galumphing 'Round the Nation (as Andrea Keller Quartet)	Released: June 2010; Label: Andrea Keller
Three Lanes (with Genevieve Lacey & Joe Talia)	Released: May 2012; Label: Andrea Keller (AK001)
Wave Rider (as Andrea Keller Quartet)	Released: November 2013; Label: Jazzhead (HEAD191)
Family Portraits	Released: November 2013; Label: Jazzhead (HEAD188)
Consider This (with Tim Wilson)	Released: 2015; Label: no label
Andrea Keller Quartet Greatest Hits (as Andrea Keller Quartet)	Released: April 2016; Label: Andrea Keller (AK002)
The Komeda Project (with Miroslav Bukovsky)	Released: 2016; Label: Andrea Keller (AK004)
Still Night: Music in Poetry	Released: November 2017; Label: Andrea Keller
Five Below Live	Released: July 2018; Label: Andrea Keller
Transients Volume 1	Released: May 2019; Label: Andrea Keller
Transients Volume 2	Released: November 2019; Label: Andrea Keller
Life is Brut[if]al (as Andrea Keller Five Below)	Released: June 2020; Label: Andrea Keller
Andrea Keller Curates Monday Nights Live at the Jazzlab – Volume 1 – The Composers' Circle (as The Composers Circle)	Released: August 2020; Label: Andrea Keller
Journey Home	Released: September 2020; Label: Andrea Keller
Andrea Keller Curates Monday Nights Live at the Jazzlab – Volume 2 – Meditations for 2 to 3 Players	Released: November 2020; Label: Andrea Keller
Flicker & Polar Bird	Released: October 2023; Label: Andrea Keller

== Awards and nominations ==
=== AIR Awards ===
The Australian Independent Record Awards (commonly known informally as AIR Awards) is an annual awards night to recognise, promote and celebrate the success of Australia's Independent Music sector.

Year	Nominee / work	Award	Result
2014	Wave Rider (as Andrea Keller Quartet with Strings)	Best Independent Jazz Album Artist	Nominated

=== ARIA Music Awards ===
The ARIA Music Awards is an annual awards ceremony that recognises excellence, innovation, and achievement across all genres of the music of Australia.

Year	Nominee / work	Award	Result	Ref.
2002	Thirteen Sketches	Best Jazz Album	Won	
2003	Mikrokosmos	Best Jazz Album	Won	
2005	Angels and Rascals (as Amanda Keller Quartet)	Best Jazz Album	Nominated	
2007	Little Claps (as Amanda Keller Quartet)	Best Jazz Album	Nominated	
2008	Footprints	Best Jazz Album	Won	
2013	Portraits (as Amanda Keller Family)	Best Jazz Album	Nominated	
2014	Wave Rider (with Quartet with Strings)	Best Jazz Album	Nominated	
2019	Transients Vol. 1	Best Jazz Album	Nominated	

=== Australian Jazz Bell Awards ===
The Australian Jazz Bell Awards, (also known as the Bell Awards or The Bells), are annual music awards for the jazz music genre in Australia. They commenced in 2003.

Year	Nominee / work	Award	Result
2003	Mikrokosmos – Andrea Keller	Best Australian Contemporary Jazz Album	Won
2008	Little Claps – Andrea Keller Quartet	Best Australian Contemporary Jazz Album	Won
2012	Andrea Keller Quartet	Best Australian Jazz Ensemble	Won
2014	Wave Rider – Andrea Keller Quartet	Best Australian Modern Jazz Album	Won
2017	Consider This – Andrea Keller and Tim Wilson Duo	Best Australian Instrumental Jazz Album	Won
2018	Still Night: Music in Poetry – Andrea Keller	Best Australian Jazz Vocal Album	Won
2019	Five Below Live – Andrea Keller	Best Australian Jazz Ensemble of the Year	Won

- Note wins only

=== Music Victoria Awards ===
The Music Victoria Awards, are an annual awards night celebrating Victorian music. They commenced in 2005. (awards 2005-2012 are unknown).

Year	Nominee / work	Award	Result	Ref.
2013	Family Portraits	Best Jazz Album	Nominated	
2014	Wave Rider (with Quartet with Strings)	Best Jazz Album	Nominated	
2019	Transients Vol. 1	Best Jazz Album	Won	
2020	Life Is Brut[if]al	Best Jazz Album	Nominated	
2021	herself	Outstanding Woman in Music	Nominated	
2021	herself	Best Musician	Nominated	
2021	herself	Best Jazz Act	Won	
