= Australian jazz =

Music genre or scene

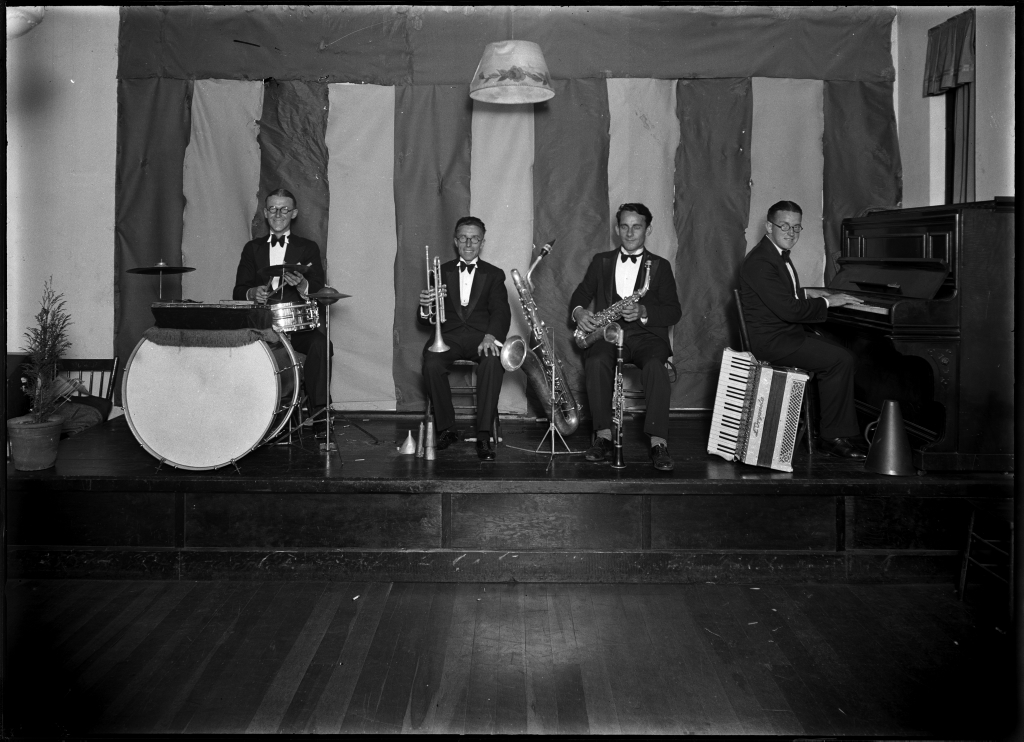
Australian Dance band at the Jack Keating Dance Studio circa 1930 from the Tom Lennon collection, courtesy of the Powerhouse Museum

Jazz music has a long history in Australia. Over the years jazz has held a high-profile at local clubs, festivals and other music venues and a vast number of recordings have been produced by Australian jazz musicians, many of whom have gone on to gain a high profile in the international jazz arena.

Jazz is an American musical genre originated by African Americans but the style was rapidly and enthusiastically taken up by musicians all over the world, including Australia. Jazz and jazz-influenced syncopated dance music was being performed in Australia within a year of the emergence of jazz as a definable musical genre in the United States.

Until the 1950s the primary form of accompaniment at Australian public dances was jazz-based dance music, modeled on the leading white British and American jazz bands, and this style enjoyed wide popularity.

It was not until after World War II that Australian jazz scene began to diversify as local musicians were finally able to get access to recordings by leading African-American jazz musicians like Charlie Parker, Dizzy Gillespie, Miles Davis and Thelonious Monk, with bebop, cool jazz and free jazz exerting a strong influence on Australian musicians in the late 1950s and beyond.

Although jazz in Australia suffered a significant drop in popularity during the Sixties, as it did in most other countries, there was a marked resurgence of interest in the Seventies, Eighties and Nineties as a new generation of musicians came to the fore.

As in the popular field, it is also important to acknowledge the role of New Zealand musicians on the Australian jazz scene – in the view of jazz historian Andrew Bisset, it is impossible to properly discuss the subject of Australian jazz without reference to New Zealand. Many of the leading "Australian" jazz playing musicians of the last 80 years have come from New Zealand, beginning with figures like reeds player Abe Romaine in the 1920s and later including renowned pianist-composers Judy Bailey, Mike Nock and Dave MacRae, and vocalist Ricky May.

== Jazz precursors in Australia ==
White American and British 'black face' bards (musician/actors in make-up) brought imitations of slave plantation music (and dance) to Australia by the 1840s, featuring characteristics that later became associated with jazz, such as polyrhythmic 'breaks'. From the 1850s, full minstrel shows with minstrel 'orchestras', including locally formed troupes, toured the major capital cities and smaller, boom towns like Ballarat and Bendigo. Visits by American vaudeville troupes became much more common after the introduction of regular steamship services between America and Australia in the 1870s. Some genuine African-American minstrel troupes and Jubilee Singers (black chamber choirs) toured from the 1870s.

Ragtime reached Australia in the 1890s in the form of syncopated cakewalk march music and syncopated "coon-song" and many white and black ragtime artists of repute toured Australia, including the black ragtime vocalist, Ernest Hogan, and white artists Ben Harney (the self-proclaimed 'originator' of ragtime) and Gene Greene (the Emperor of Ragtime). Greene in particular taught many Australian artists how to 'rag' (improvise in ragtime style).

== Early 20th century ==
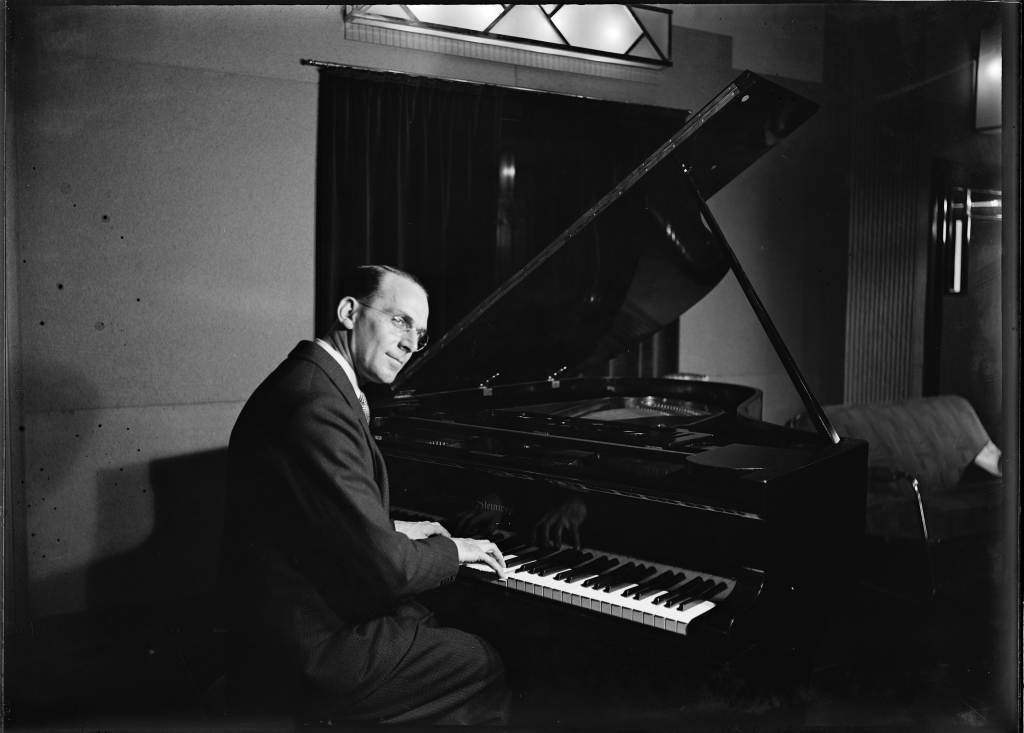
Ces Morrison at the piano circa 1930 from the Tom Lennon collection, courtesy of the Powerhouse Museum

Belle Sylvia and Her Jazz Band were billed as "Australia’s first jazz band" when they performed at Ben Fuller's National Theatre in Sydney in 1918, though they were a band imported from England.

Thanks to close Australian links with American theatrical entertainment circuits, and Tin Pan Alley marketing of American music to Australia via phonograph records, modern dance arrangements, piano rolls and visiting jazz acts, Australians developed a strong interest in jazz influenced dance music and its related forms. 'Jazz' or 'jass' (hot dance music) was well established by the mid-1920s. Jazz was recorded on piano-rolls in Australia before 1923 and disc recordings like "Red Hot Mamma" and "Sweet Georgia Brown" by Ray Tellier's San Francisco Orchestra were also being recorded by 1925.

The biggest musical influence in the period 1923–1928 was a succession of visiting white American jazz (or dance) orchestras, mainly from the West Coast. Frank Ellis and his Californians, who arrived in 1923. Thousands of dance fans regularly flocked to see them at Sydney's largest dance hall, the Palais Royale (the Royal Hall of Industries at Moore Park, which still stands today). American bands and individual imported 'jazz specialists'continued to be imported by Australian theatrical entrepreneurs until the end of the 1920s. Australians could study the performance and presentation style of these bands first-hand and talented local musicians were soon offered places in some of them.

Restrictions on touring American bands after 1928, resulting from the forced departure of the visiting African-American band Sonny Clay's Plantation Orchestra meant that Australian dance musician usually had to learn about jazz from recorded or written sources. These included imported recordings, dance arrangements, jazz on film (after 1929), patent 'how to jazz courses', individual visiting artists (most of whom were white) and literature such as Australian Dance Band News (1932–with subsequent title changes).

However, from the early 1930s, Australian dance musicians began to hear and absorb the work of black artists and leaders like Duke Ellington and Armstrong as well as English jazz influences. Notable swing bands of the 1930s included Jim Davidson & His New Palais Royal Orchestra, Frank Coughlan & His Trocadero Orchestra, Dudley Cantrell & His Grace Grenadiers, and numerous others and many were recorded.

Australian jazz musician Bert Howell toured the world in 1933 playing compositions like "Wabash Moon" by Australian composer Reginald Stoneham.

Trombonist and bandleader Frank Coughlan (1904–1979) has been called "The Father of Australian Jazz". His career lasted from the early 1920s to the 1970s. In 1936, he was selected to lead the jazz orchestra formed for the opening of the Sydney Trocadero. He continued leading the orchestra at the venue until it closed in 1971.

== Post–World War II jazz ==
After the end of World War II Australian jazz began to diverge into two major strands: dixieland or 'traditional jazz' (early jazz) and modern styles like progressive swing, boogie-woogie and bop as exemplified by the music of Charlie Parker and Dizzy Gillespie

Graeme Bell was an important contributor to Melbourne's 1940s traditional jazz boom and in 1947 his band, with the support of Harry Stein, was a great success when they played at the World Youth Festival in Prague, Czechoslovakia, going on to tour Europe and finally basing themselves in England where they are said to have exerted a strong influence on the European traditional jazz revival of that era. On returning to Australia Graeme Bell's Jazz Band worked successfully on the local club circuit, as well as recording and touring extensively.

The Australian Jazz Quartet/Quintet was a contemporary Australian jazz group that did very well in the US at that time. In the early 1950s pianist Bryce Rohde along with Errol Buddle (reeds) and Jack Brokensha (vibes and drums) moved from Australia to Windsor in Canada. An agent heard them play locally and asked if they would come across the border to back female vocalist Chris Connor at a nightclub in Detroit. This started the ball rolling, and in 1953, along with American saxophonist and bassist Dick Healey, they formed the Australian Jazz Quartet.

This very successful unit recorded ten albums and worked at most major US jazz venues. Sometimes a bass player and drummer would be hired to complement the group during recording sessions, and when they ultimately added a permanent bass player they renamed themselves the Australian Jazz Quintet (AJQ). American bassist Ed Gaston joined the AJQ while they were touring the US in 1958 and he later married and settled down in Australia, becoming an important contributor to the local jazz scene in the ensuing years. Drummer Colin Bailey played with the AJQ from 1958–60.

The AJQ was highly rated in polls run by US jazz magazines such as Down Beat. They worked on the same bill as names like Miles Davis, Count Basie, Gerry Mulligan, Dave Brubeck and the Modern Jazz Quartet; backed singers Billie Holiday and Carmen McRae; and played at top venues such as Carnegie Hall and Birdland.

Another Australian jazz musician, bassist Bruce Cale, was an early collaborator with Bryce Rohde in Sydney, and subsequently moved to London where he worked with the famous Tubby Hayes Quartet and other jazz groups before relocating to the US in 1966. He went on to play in bands led by John Handy, Ernie Watts, John Klemmer and Jack Walrath, to name just a few. Based in the US for several years, Cale also worked with Zoot Sims, Toshiko Akiyoshi, Mose Allison, James Zitro, ContraBand, Phil Woods, Alan Dawson ... Back in Australia in the late 1970s he worked with most of Australia's leading musicians and in particular his own quartet with Dale Barlow, Roger Frampton and Phil Treloar. In the 1980s he concentrated on composition, working on specially commissioned pieces and also studied with George Russell. In the intervening years he has performed with many of his favourite jazz musicians in Australia including Julian Lee, Kevin Hunt, Mike Nock, Bob Bertles, John Sangster, Sandy Evans and many more. His bass sound has been heard by anyone who ever listened to Jim McLeods JazzTrack on ABC Radio as the memorable signature music for many years was Windows of Arquez which he recorded with Bryce Rhode.

The El Rocco became a legend in Australian jazz history and in the 1980s a documentary movie Beyond The El Rocco was made about the club. Many of Sydney's top musicians worked there early in their careers including John Sangster, John Pochee, Don Burrows, George Golla, Alan Turnbull and Judy Bailey.

The Three Out trio with Mike Nock (Piano), Freddy Logan (Bass), and Chris Karan (Drums) attracted some of the largest crowds at Sydney's El Rocco, a small cellar club situated in Kings Cross. Originally from New Zealand, Mike Nock came to Sydney in the late 1950s and almost immediately scored a regular spot at the El Rocco. Bassist Freddy Logan hailed from the Netherlands and had already been very active in the Sydney jazz scene both as a player and a promoter of jazz, and in later years drummer Chris Karan would gain international recognition as a member of the Dudley Moore Trio.

The members of the Three Out Trio first got together as part of a group that Sydney alto saxophonist Frank Smith put together as the house band at "The Embers", a very successful jazz club in Melbourne that also featured top international jazz artists such as the Oscar Peterson Trio and Benny Carter. Before he left for Melbourne Frank Smith had made a big impression in Sydney, he worked with most of the top professional bands and could often be found playing at the El Rocco in its earlier years. A handful of Sydney jazz musicians including John Pochee, Barry Woods, Dave MacRae, Andy Brown and Bernie McGann also travelled south around that time, finding work in venues such as "The Fat Black Pussycat", another Melbourne jazz club that provided an outlet for those intent on playing uncompromising forms of jazz. The most successful group to appear at Sydney's Mocambo Restaurant in King St Newtown was the Mocambo Four, with Sid Edwards (Vibraphone), Tony Esterman (Piano), Winston Sterling (Bass) and Laurie Kennedy (Drums). The piano chair was also filled by Tony Curby or Bob Dunn over the band's stint of around 4 years during the early 1960s. This venue was very well attended, with people often lined up in the street waiting to get in.

In 1957, jazz producer Horst Liepolt set up a new venue in Melbourne, "Jazz Centre 44". For four to five nights a week, and Sunday afternoons, up to 200 people would gather in the upstairs room to hear Brian Brown, Stewie Speer, Alan Lee, Graeme Morgan, Keith Hounslow, the Melbourne New Orleans Jazz Band and many other local jazz musicians, and Jazz Centre 44 remained a major venue for jazz in Melbourne for almost a decade.

=== Impact of television ===
Television was an important source of work for jazz musicians in the early-mid-1960s; the GTV-9 house band, which provided music for programs like Graham Kennedy's In Melbourne Tonight employed many of best players on the Melbourne jazz/session scene and showcased younger entrants into the scene, such as The Red Onion Jazz Band. Melbourne musicians like Brian Brown, Bruce Clarke and Frank Smith also worked extensively on soundtracks and advertising music, and Clarke's Jingle Workshop studio in St Kilda, which produced much important music in these genres, was a significant focus, not merely for its commercial work, but also because it was the venue for regular Sunday jam sessions, many of which Clarke recorded.

Rock 'n' roll rapidly gained popularity in the youth music scene from the mid-1950s and pop and rock continued to dominate in the Sixties and beyond. Many leading jazz performers like Graeme Lyall, Stewie Speer and John Sangster and Tony Buchanan worked with rock groups and absorbed important stylistic influences from the Motown, soul music and funk genres.

From the late 1960s, there was a revival to the 'big band' format, partly fuelled by the popularity of big band rock ensembles like Blood Sweat & Tears and Chicago. The most notable local modern big band was the acclaimed but short-lived Daly-Wilson Big Band, which enjoyed considerable popularity and which was the first Australian musical act to tour the Soviet Union. Another very popular band is Galapagos Duck, who exerted a huge influence on the Sydney jazz scene as part-owners of and regular performers at Sydney's longest-running jazz venue, The Basement, which opened in 1973. Serge Ermoll's Free Kata, the first free jazz ensemble to record and internationally release a series of albums including The New Language of Music on EMI and the Philips Records title Spontaneous Improvisations.

An early example of jazz on Australian television was Sweet and Low, a 1959 ABC series which aired for a six-episode season. Another series was Look Who's Dropped In, a four-episode ABC series that aired 1957–1958, and 1959 ABC series Australian All Star Jazz Band.

=== Women in jazz ===
Women had played in jazz bands of their own since the early 1920s, with bands led by Thelma Ready, Eve Rees, Alice Dolphin, and Grace Funston, among others. The groups were often considered a novelty by the press, but received employment at venues such as Melbourne's Palais Pictures. The groups gained further popularity during World War II, but many found themselves unemployed following the war, with Grace Funston complaining that when the male musicians had returned the women lost their jobs. Singer Barbara James was considered one of Australia's most famous big band vocalists during the 1930s. She performed with Jim Davidson and Frank Coughlan, among others.

At the Palais, an all female band continued to perform until 1949 when the big band sound began to lose favour with the public.

== Jazz in the 1970s ==
A very significant development in 1973 was the inception of the jazz studies course at the Sydney Conservatorium of Music, the first jazz course to be offered by an Australian tertiary institution. The then Director of the Sydney Conservatorium, Rex Hobcroft, was approached by jazz musician Don Burrows about the idea of putting together a jazz studies course. Radio station Fine Music Sydney (then known as 2MBS) was launched in 1974 and would broadcast jazz music to this day.

Ultimately American saxophonist and music educator Howie Smith was brought to Sydney on a grant from the Fulbright Program to set up the course. The grant was originally for 9 months but Howie Smith ended up staying for three years, and as well as his involvement with the Conservatorium he also became very active in the Sydney jazz scene, mostly with the group Jazz Co/op which also included local musicians Roger Frampton (piano), Jack Thorncraft (bass) and Phil Treloar (drums).

When The Basement opened its doors it became Sydney's major jazz club during the seventies, and its success encouraged many other venue owners to hire jazz groups. Jazz producer Horst Liepolt, who was booking bands for The Basement, became very active at that time and he set in motion a number of jazz venues and events, including The Manly Jazz Festival, Jazz at the Sydney Festival and his own series of jazz concerts titled "Music is an Open Sky". Horst Liepolt also set up the 44 record label (a subsidiary of Phonogram records) which recorded over 30 albums of local jazz. He also organised numerous successful concerts at many of Sydney's high-profile entertainment venues including the Sydney Opera House and the Regent Theatre.

This major resurgence of Australian jazz took place mostly in Sydney, but it had some flow-on effects in the jazz scene throughout Australia. Many jazz musicians came to Sydney from other areas of Australia during this decade, either to perform at special concerts or in some cases to live permanently and pursue a career in music. There was also a more than usual interest for jazz in Melbourne during the 1970s. Jazz performances were included in the Moomba Festival and Melbourne jazz musicians such as Tony Gould, Brian Brown, Bob Sedergreen and Ted Vining benefited from the resurgence of interest in the music at that time.

A lot of top American jazz musicians performed in Sydney during the seventies, and major players such as Dave Liebman, John Scofield and Miroslav Vitous gave master classes and workshops while they were there.

Bob Barnard has become an icon of Australian jazz and has probably made more of an impression internationally than any other Australian jazz musician. In the year of 1974 the Bob Barnard Jazz Band was formed.

Jazz fusion, as typified by groups like Return to Forever, largely passed Australia by, although the group Crossfire was probably the best and best-known Australian act to work in this area.

Some of the many working jazz groups in Sydney during the seventies were the Jazz Co/op, John Pochee's The Last Straw, The Don Burrows Quartet, the Galapagos Duck, The Judy Bailey Quartet, Kerrie Biddell and Compared to What, the Bob Barnard Jazz Band, Paul Furniss' Eclipse Alley Five, Col Nolan and the Soul Syndicate featuring vocalist Johnny Nicol, the Peter Boothman / Sid Edwards quartet, Serge Ermoll and Free Kata, and Craig Benjamin's Out To Lunch.

The jazz scene in Sydney slowed down a little towards the start of the 1980s when The Basement pursued a more commercial music policy after extending their premises by adding a large upstairs area. Around that same time Horst Liepolt left Australia, going on to a successful career in jazz production in New York, and this left a major gap in the area of jazz promotion in Sydney. However traditional and mainstream bands continued to do well in the pub scene and contemporary jazz could still be found in venues such as The Paradise at Kings Cross, Jenny's in the inner city and Morgan's Feedwell at Glebe.

== 1980s and 1990s ==
Before the 1980s co-ordination of Jazz concerts was particularly lacking. The NSW Jazz Co-ordination program helped the establishment of the Sydney Improvised Music Association in Sydney quickly followed by the establishment of the Melbourne Jazz Co-operative in 1982. Both sought and gained Federal Government Arts Council funding soon after establishment. Similar Jazz co-ordination programs were established in other states with Arts Council and State Government Funding.

Through the 1980s and 1990s jazz remained a small but vibrant sector of the Australian music industry. Despite its relative lack of visibility in the mass market, Australian jazz continued to develop to a high level of creativity and professionalism that, for the most part, has been inversely proportional to its low level of public and industry recognition and acceptance.

Players who were more influenced by traditional or cool jazz streams tended to dominate public attention and some moved successfully into academia. Multi-instrumentalist Don Burrows was for several decades a regular presence on television and radio, as well as being a prolific session musician. His quartets (usually with George Golla on guitar) played at many of the top international jazz festivals and he recorded prolifically in the 1970s and 80s. Although Burrows made no secret of his dislike for the bebop and free jazz strands, he became a senior teacher at the Sydney Conservatorium of Music and has exerted a strong influence on Australian jazz through his recordings, performances and teaching.

Burrows' protege, trumpeter James Morrison, who was influenced by Louis Armstrong, has carved out a successful career playing a style not unlike that of Wynton Marsalis, that blended some modern elements (e.g. the crowd-pleasing high-register technical bravura of Dizzy Gillespie) with the accessible structures and melodies of 'trad' and 'cool' jazz.

Another important figure in Australian jazz education was Melbourne musician/composer Brian Brown. In his early career Brown had been a pioneer of the Australian hard bop stream, and (with close friend and longtime bandmate Stewie Speer) Brown's various groups were leading lights of Melbourne's legendary Jazz Centre 44 from the late 1950s. Through the '60s and '70s however, Brown's group sound and compositional ideas moved away from the 'classic' American modern jazz idiom, and he developed his own distinctive style that concentrated on interactive improvisation. Brown founded the jazz course at the Victorian College of the Arts in 1980 and headed it for the next 18 years, and through his weekly Workshop classes he influenced hundreds of young musicians with his ideas on group performance.

Multi-instrumental wind player Dale Barlow emerged in the late 1970s as one of the most promising new talents on the Australian scene, and after stints in the Young Northside Big Band and a formative period in the David Martin Quintet (with James Morrison), he moved to New York, where he was a member of two famed groups, the Cedar Walton Quartet and Art Blakey's Jazz Messengers. Barlow has also toured and recorded with many other jazz greats including Sonny Stitt, Chet Baker, Gil Evans, Jackie McLean, Billy Cobham, Curtis Fuller, Eddie Palmieri, Dizzy Gillespie, Benny Golson, Lee Konitz, Sonny Stitt, Helen Merrill, Mulgrew Miller and Kenny Barron. In 1980 he performed at concerts in Adelaide and Sydney with the Bruce Cale Quartet with Roger Frampton (piano and saxes) Bruce Cale (bass) and Phil Treloar (drums). Two live concerts by this group have been recorded, The Bruce Cale Quartet Live (Adelaide concert) and On Fire – The Sydney Concert.

Guitarist Tony Barnard one of the new breed of musicians to emerge during the late 70s and early 80s, playing bebop, mainstream and original material. Before he reached the age of 20, Barnard had recorded with Don Burrows and John Sangster, toured extensively, performed at the Sydney Opera house and played with overseas stars and just about everybody in the Sydney jazz scene, holding down up to four residencies a week, including the Basement, the Old Rocks push, and Tides Wine bar in Bondi. He formed the band Interplay, Australia's first five guitar ensemble performing big band repertoire to critical acclaim. His popular "All Hat Jazz Band" packing the Unity Hall Hotel in Balmain for some 6 years. In the late 90s moving to the UK, touring Europe and performing with stars like, Keely Smith, Rufus Reid, Curtis Stigers and Kevin Spacey, also joining the much lauded and famous Ronnie Scott's Jazz Orchestra where he has been resident guitarist for 8 years. Barnard's double album The Australian Suite, was received with praise by critics.

Many "second generation" bebop-influenced performers like New Zealand born pianist Mike Nock, bassist Lloyd Swanton, saxophonist Dale Barlow, pianist Chris Abrahams, saxophonist Sandy Evans, pianist and Roger Frampton (who died in 2000) rose to prominence in this period, alongside their older contemporaries, led by Bernie McGann and John Pochee, whose long-running group The Last Straw (founded in 1974) has carried the torch for this stream of jazz for many years.

New Zealand-born pianist-composer Dave McRae established himself as a performer of note in Australia in the 1960s before moving overseas, where he branched out into a diverse range of activities including a stint as the keyboard player in the British 1970s progressive rock group Matching Mole and collaborating with Bill Oddie of The Goodies on music for their TV series. Tony Buchanan, saxophonist, played with Dave Macrae in London. They formed a small jazz band called Galapagus Duck. Tony Buchanan went on to play in Maynard Ferguson's Canadian Big Band and also did a short stint on baritone sax in the Buddy Rich Big Band. He also toured with big names such as Frank Sinatra, Tom Jones, Engelbert Humperdinck, Shirley MacLaine and others.

The trio of Tony Buck (drums), and the aforementioned Lloyd Swanton (bass) and Chris Abrahams (piano), known together as The Necks since forming in 1987 (see 1987 in music), have been particularly notable for hypnotic hour-long jazz, ambient and otherwise widely influenced spontaneous compositions, gaining widespread attention both in Australia and internationally. Their album Drive-By, which consists of a single 60-minute track, was named Jazz Album of the Year in the 2004 ARIA Awards.

== 2000 to present ==
During the 1990s and early 2000s, there was a noticeable trend back towards jazz by many popular performers who had been associated with the rock genre. Most notable amongst these were Kate Ceberano and Vince Jones who released traditional jazz or jazz-influenced albums within a very short period of time which included high record sales and performances to large audiences.

Compared to the latter years of the 1900s jazz lost some of its impetus in Australia in the first decade of the twenty-first century. However it is still very visible in a number of venues including Melbourne's Bennett's Lane Jazz Club and concerts in Sydney staged by groups such as Sydney Improvised Music Association, Venue 505, The Jazzgroove Association, and The Jazz Action Society. The Melbourne Jazz Co-operative since 2007 has run three jazz concerts a week in Melbourne, the most active jazz presenter organisation in Australia.

The early 2000s saw the introduction of jazz studies at Monash University: a jazz program that is now a leader in jazz education in Australia with staff including Robert Burke, Paul Williamson, Jordan Murray and Johannes Luebbers. The award-winning Monash Art Ensemble (MAE) is their flagship ensemble promoting experimentation and Australian music. The program also produced a long series or recordings (Monash Sessions) inclusive of National and International collaboration.

In the 2010s, jazz music continues to be a valid and visible form of expression in Australia. Although jazz is virtually ignored by mainstream media, Australia is home to one of the only national 24/7 jazz networks in the world, ABC Jazz as part of the national broadcaster, the Australian Broadcasting Corporation (ABC).

ABC Jazz broadcasts jazz 24 hours a day on DAB+ Digital Radio, Digital TV, online at abc.net.au/jazz and on the ABC Radio mobile app. It broadcasts original presented shows by Mal Stanley, Megan Burslem, James Valentine and Monica Trapaga, as well as weekly featured albums, live sets, and interviews. ABC Jazz also records local acts and broadcasts local content in the regular playlist.

== Australian jazz festivals ==
Jazz festivals have been staged across Australia, with the 1st Annual Australian International Jazz Festival held in 1960 in four states featuring international and local acts. More recent festivals include the Adelaide Jazz Festival, Dingo Creek Jazz and Blues Festival, Grampians Jazz Festival, Manly Jazz Festival, Melbourne Jazz Festival, Melbourne Jazz Fringe Festival, Perth International Jazz Festival, Stonnington Jazz Festival, Sydney International Women’s Jazz Festival, Wagga Wagga Jazz Festival, and Wangaratta Festival of Jazz.

== Australian Jazz Convention ==
Commencing in 1946, the Australian Jazz Convention is the longest running annual jazz event in the world. The Convention archives are housed at the Australian Jazz Museum, which maintains a collection of Australian and overseas jazz materials. The first convention was co-founded by pianist Willie "The Lion" McIntyre.

The 68th Australian Jazz Convention was held in Goulburn, NSW, from 26 to 31 December 2013. Over 500 Musicians, Delegates and Day Pass Holders participated in the Convention. This was the first Convention arranged by the AJC Executive Task Force Inc, a group of 6 jazz musicians and enthusiasts formed after the 67th Australian Jazz Convention failed to be provided with an option for the 68th Convention.

Following the success of the 68th Australian Jazz Convention the Annual General Meeting on 30 December 2013 endorsed the recommendation of the AJC Executive Task Force that the 69th Australian Jazz Convention be held at Swan Hill, Victoria from 26 to 31 December 2014. This Convention saw an increase in the number of musicians and delegates on those that participated in the 68th. A highlight of the Convention was the participation of 30 young musicians from the VJC Jazz Youth Workshop.

On 30 December 2014, the 69th AGM was presented with two options for the 70th AJC by the AJC ETF, Penrith NSW and Ballarat Victoria. The meeting selected Ballarat as the venue. The AJC was hosted by Ballarat for four years, the longest the Convention has settled since inception. At the 73rd AJC, 30 December 2018, the AGM accepted a proposal from Albury to host the 74th AJC.

The 74th AJC (2019), under continued management by the AJC ETF, hosted guest artists for the first time in over 30 years. With financial support from the NSW Government Marla Dixon (trumpet and vocals) and Shaye Cohn (piano and cornet), band leaders from New Orleans performed throughout the 74th AJC with Australian musicians. Their presence was greeted by popular acclaim from musicians and delegates.

Regrettably, the 75th AJC, scheduled for December 2020, was postponed until December 2021 due to the COVID-19 pandemic.

== Australian jazz archives ==
Australia has two main jazz archives, the Australian Jazz Museum and the National Film and Sound Archive's Australian Jazz Archive. The latter was started in 1997 by members of the Australian jazz community, and collects photos, recordings, and oral histories.

The Australian Jazz Museum begun in 1996 as the Victorian Jazz Archive, but later became the Australian Jazz Museum in 2014, to better reflect their national role, after several other Australian state jazz archives closed.

The Australian Performing Arts Collection also includes jazz related content in their collections, such as collections of Canberra Jazz Club, Grace Funston, and Jim Davidson, as well as photographs from events such as Melbourne International Jazz Festival, and Stonnington Jazz Festival.

== Australian jazz magazines ==
Established in 1932, Music Maker was a Sydney-based magazine available nationally, with a focus on jazz music. In 1957, they ran a poll to find the most popular jazz musicians in Australia. The winners recorded an album; the line-up included Ken Brentnall (trumpet), Johnny Bamford (trombone), Frank Smith (alto sax), Malcolm "Mal" Cunningham (flute), Don Burrows (clarinet), Dave Owens (tenor sax), Terry Wilkinson (piano), Johnny Weine (guitar), Pat Caplice (vibraphone), Ron Webber (drums), and Freddy Logan (bass).

Other titles included Jazz Notes (started 1941), The Beat (1949), Matrix (1954), Jazz Down Under (1974), Jazz Australia (1980), Jazz (1984), and Dingo (2021). AJazz (2016), formerly V Jazz (1998), is the quarterly magazine of the Australian Jazz Museum.

== Notable Australian jazz musicians ==
- Ade Monsbourgh
- Alan Lee
- Alan Turnbull
- Allan Browne
- Andrea Keller
- Barney McAll
- Ben Eunson
- Bernie McGann
- Bob Barnard
- Bob Bertles
- Bob Sedergreen
- Bruce Cale
- Bruce Clarke
- Bryce Rohde
- Charlie Munro
- Chris Ludowyk
- Chris McNulty
- Dale Barlow
- Dannielle Gaha
- Dave Dallwitz
- Dave Panichi
- David Jones
- Don Burrows
- Edoardo Santoni
- Emma Pask
- Errol Buddle
- Eugene Ball
- Frank Coughlan
- Frank Gambale
- George Golla
- Graeme Bell
- Graeme Lyall
- Graham Wood
- Ian Cooper
- Jack Brokensha
- Jacki Cooper
- James Morrison
- James Muller
- Jamie Oehlers
- Janet Seidel
- Johannes Luebbers
- John McAll
- John Morrison
- John Pochée
- John Sangster
- Jordan Murray
- Joshua Rusitovski
- Kerrie Biddell
- Kristin Berardi
- Matt Jodrell
- Mark Simmonds
- Mike Nock
- Miroslav Bukovsky
- Nadje Noordhuis
- Nick Haywood
- Nicki Parrott
- Niran Dasika
- Paul Furniss
- Paul Grabowsky
- Paul Williamson (trumpet)
- Peter Boothman
- Quentin Angus
- Robert Burke
- Roger Frampton
- Sam Anning
- Sam Keevers
- Sandy Evans
- Sarah Maclaine
- Scott Tinkler
- Shannon Barnett
- Stephen Magnusson
- Tamsin West
- Ted Nettelbeck
- Tommy Emmanuel
- Tony Gould
- Troy Roberts
- Vince Jones

=== Notable ensembles ===
- Australian Art Orchestra
- The Australian Jazz Quartet
- Bennetts Lane Big Band
- The Catholics
- Cootamundra Jazz Band
- Crossfire
- Galapagos Duck
- The Jive Bombers
- The Necks
- The Port Jackson Jazz Band
- The Syncopators
- Swing City
- Triosk
- The Vampires
- Wanderlust
- Monash Art Ensemble

== General references ==
- Bisset, Andrew. Black Roots White Flowers – A History of Jazz in Australia. Golden Press, 1979. ISBN 0-85558-680-X
- Clare, John. Bodgie Dada and the Cult of the Cool. University of NSW Press, 1995. ISBN 0-86840-103-X.
- Johnson, Bruce. The Oxford Companion to Australian Jazz. Oxford University Press, 1987. ISBN 0-19-554791-8
- Kirchner, Bill, ed. The Oxford Companion to Jazz. Oxford University Press, 2000.
- Whiteoak, John. Playing Ad Lib: Improvisatory Music in Australia: 1836–70. Currency Press, 1999. ISBN 0-86819-543-X
