= Australian Jazz Museum =

Coordinates: 37.8583°S 145.2082°E

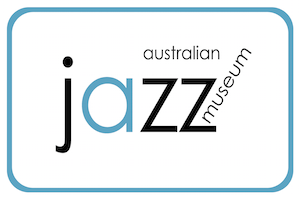
- Former name: Victorian Jazz Archive
- Established: 1996
- Location: 15 Mountain Highway, Wantirna 3152, Victoria, Australia
- Type: Jazz music museum and archive
- Website: www.ajm.org.au

The Australian Jazz Museum (AJM), formerly Victorian Jazz Archive (VJA), is a jazz museum located in Wantirna, Victoria, Australia.

== History ==
Originally founded as the Victorian Jazz Archive (VJA) in 1996, with the inaugural meeting held at the then Whitehorse Hotel, Melbourne on 18 August 1996, the archive was founded to address the growing concern among the jazz community that the rich Australian jazz heritage was at risk of being lost.

From June 2006 to January 2007, the VJA presented the Bilarm and Swaggie Exhibition, featuring the catalogues of those two predominantly jazz labels.

In 2014 the archive changed its name to The Australian Jazz Museum to better reflect their role, after several other Australian state jazz archives closed.

== Collections ==
The museum holds an extensive collection of discs, audio cassettes, posters, books, photographs, instruments and ephemera including works by such Australian Jazz luminaries as Graeme Bell, Bob Barnard, Ade Monsbourgh, Smacka Fitzgibbon and Frank Traynor together with magazines, periodicals and newspaper articles on Australian jazz musicians and many international performers. They also hold the Australian Jazz Convention's collection.

The building includes a research library and is open to the public on Tuesdays and also by appointment for tours of the facilities.

== Publications ==
The museum publishes AJazz, a quarterly magazine for members. The magazine began in 1998 as VJazz, before changing its name to AJazz in 2016.

They also release a series of CDs titled Rare Collectible Jazz, that collect restored Australian jazz recordings. The series began in 2002, and has included CDs collecting Modern Jazz such as The Australian Jazz Quartet, The Three Out, and Bryce Rohde Quintet, as well as early Dixieland jazz. The CDs are made available for sale through the museum store.

== Awards ==
In 2002, John Kennedy was awarded an MIRA Award for Meritorious Volunteer Achievement due to his work with the AJM.

In 2005, the AJM (under its former title VJA) received the Knox City Council's Knox Pride Award for Outstanding Archive of Everything Jazz.

In 2007 the AJM received the Victorian Community History Awards (Best Exhibit / Display) for its Jazz Spans the Decades – A History of Jazz in Victoria exhibit. That same year, AJM member John Kennedy won an award from the Australian Sound Recording Association for "outstanding achievement and leadership in the Jazz Archiving community".

In 2009, the AJM received a Community Heritage Award and Grant from National Library of Australia.

In 2010, the AJM won a Special Commendation in Knox City Council's Environment Awards.

In 2012, the AJM received a Victorian Museum Award in the category for volunteer-run museums.

In 2013, the AJM received a Sir Rupert Hamer Award for their Jazz Digitisation Project.

== See also ==
- List of music museums
- National Film and Sound Archive, who have their own Australian Jazz Archive.
