= Funston =

Funston may refer to:

== People ==
- Edmund Bailey Funston (1868–1933), American architect
- Edward H. Funston (1836–1911), U.S. Representative from Kansas
- Farrell Funston (1936–1996), American-born Canadian football player
- Frederick Funston (1865–1917), U.S. Army general in the Spanish–American and Philippine–American Wars
- G. Keith Funston (1910–1992), American businessman and university president
- Grace Funston (1900–1984), Australian musician
- Ken Funston (1925–2005), South African cricketer

== Places ==
- Camp Funston, Kansas
- Funston, Georgia, United States
- Fort Funston, California
