= The Songs of Charcoal Lane =

Studio album by Archie Roach
- Released: 13 November 2020
- Recorded: June–July 2020
- Venue: Archie's kitchen Table, Gunditjmara country/ Killarney, Victoria
- Label: Bloodlines Records
- Producer: Archie Roach, Jill Shelton, Sam Anning, Stephen Magnusson

Archie Roach chronology
Tell Me Why (2019)	The Songs of Charcoal Lane (2020)	My Songs: 1989–2021 (2022)

The Songs of Charcoal Lane is the tenth studio album by Australian singer songwriter Archie Roach. The album is a re-recording and 30th anniversary celebration of Roach's debut studio album, Charcoal Lane. The Songs of Charcoal Lane album was recorded with Stephen Magnusson and Sam Anning, along with recording engineer Hadyn Buxton. It was announced on 9 October 2020, alongside the video of the new version of 'Took The Children Away'. The Songs of Charcoal Lane was released in November 2020.

In a press statement, Roach said the relaxed recording environment gave the new album "an intimacy [and] a closeness". Roach said "I have been so much more relaxed sitting here at my kitchen table with a cup of tea, looking out at my yard, recording the songs, maybe doing two to three takes. When we listen back to the recordings you can sense that there's a different feel, a more relaxed approach to the songs, it's more earthy."

At the 2021 ARIA Music Awards, the album won the ARIA Award for Best Blues and Roots Album.

== Track listing ==
No.	Title	Writer(s)	Length
1.	"Native Born"	Archie Roach	4:53
2.	"Charcoal Lane"	Roach	4:00
3.	"Munjana"	Roach	10:00
4.	"I've Lied"	Roach	4:24
5.	"Down City Streets"	Ruby Hunter	5:34
6.	"Took the Children Away"	Roach	6:31
7.	"Sister Brother"	Roach	5:58
8.	"Beautiful Child"	Roach	4:43
9.	"No No No"	Roach	4:12
10.	"Summer of My Life"	Roach	4:34

== Charts ==
Chart performance for The Songs of Charcoal Lane
Chart (2020)	Peak position
Australian Albums (ARIA)	176
