= VJA =

VJA may refer to:

- Victorian Jazz Archive, the former name of the Australian Jazz Museum
- VJA, the ICAO code for former American airline ValuJet Airlines
