= Robert Burke (musician) =

Australian jazz saxophonist, composer and academic

- Genres: Jazz; free improvisation
- Occupations: Saxophonist; composer; academic
- Instruments: Saxophone; clarinet
- Years active: 1980s–present
- Website: robburke.com.au

Robert Louis Burke is an Australian jazz saxophonist, composer and academic. He is a professor of jazz and improvisation at Monash University, where he established the Jazz and Popular Music program and was head of the Sir Zelman Cowen School of Music from 2011 to 2014. His recordings range from small-group jazz to free improvisation and diverse collaborations involving music from jazz to free improvisation, as well as music from the world, including Indian and Japanese musical traditions.

== Early life and musical training ==
Burke grew up in a musical family. His sisters Brigid, Grania and Rachel Burke are well-known professional musicians. He received classical training on clarinet and saxophone, studying at the Victorian College of the Arts Secondary School before concentrating on jazz at the VCA. He graduated from Monash University with a PhD. His thesis was titled "Analysis and observations of pre-learnt and idiosyncratic elements in improvisation: a reflective study in jazz performance".

== Music career ==
Burke began his professional career as a session musician, working in popular music, TV shows, theatre and recording projects doing his 'art' projects on the side. He performed and recorded with Kate Ceberano and The Black Sorrows, and contributed to recordings by other Australian performers. Monash University credits him as a performer or composer on more than 300 recordings.

His first recordings as a leader or co-leader included Gateway (1996) and A Tin Roof for the Rain (1998), both with pianist Tony Gould. He later released Wide Eyed with the Rob Burke Quartet in 2003. In a review for All About Jazz, Miriam Zolin discussed Burke's tone and phrasing and compared the quartet's use of space with his earlier duo recordings with Gould.

In the 2010s, Burke recorded with Australian and international improvisers. Shift (2017), with George Lewis, Paul Grabowsky and Mark Helias, used different duo, trio and quartet groupings. Barlines and Beyond (2017), with Debasis Chakraborty, Stephen Magnusson and Sam Evans, combined jazz improvisation with Indian classical music.

Burke and Grabowsky recorded The Gravity Project (2018) in Tokyo with Australian and Japanese musicians. The album incorporated jazz, Japanese instruments, electronic music and hip-hop. Reviewing it for The Weekend Australian, Eric Myers gave the album four stars and noted the interaction between Burke's tenor saxophone and Kuniko Obina's koto on Burke's composition "Vinegar".

Head Under Water (2018) was recorded with saxophonist Tony Malaby and bassist Mark Helias. Troy Dostert's review in All About Jazz described the album as collective free improvisation while noting the musicians' connections to the jazz tradition. Burke subsequently recorded Slip Sliding (2020) with guitarist Ben Monder and drummer Tom Rainey.

Burke has also collaborated with Scottish saxophonist and psychologist Raymond MacDonald. Their co-led album Dangerous Decision was recorded live with Grabowsky, bassist Nick Haywood and drummer Antony Floyd. In Rhythms, Des Cowley characterised the recording as long-form collective improvisation that drew on both avant-garde practice and earlier forms of group interaction in jazz.

== Academic work ==
Burke began teaching improvisation at Monash University in 2000 and subsequently established its Jazz and Popular Music program. He served as head of the university's Sir Zelman Cowen School of Music from 2011 to 2014 and is professor of jazz and improvisation. He completed a PhD in music performance at Monash in 2013. His thesis examined the relationship between learned material, individual musical identity and decision-making in jazz improvisation.

Burke co-founded the Monash Art Ensemble, a university-based ensemble involving students, staff and professional musicians. It developed from a collaboration between Monash University and the Australian Art Orchestra.

His research focuses on improvisation, collaborative creativity, and social interaction. He co-writes with Andrys Onsman, with whom he has written 2 books, with a third being published in 2027. He has published work on online improvisation with MacDonald, sociologist Tia DeNora, Maria Sappho and artist Ross Birrell, and was lead chief investigator on an Australian Research Council project concerning gender equity in Australian jazz and improvisation.

== Selected publications ==
- Onsman, Andrys, and Robert Burke. Experimentation in Improvised Jazz: Chasing Ideas. Routledge, 2019. doi:10.4324/9780429455513
- MacDonald, Raymond; DeNora, Tia; Sappho, Maria; Burke, Robert; and Birrell, Ross. New Directions in Musical Collaborative Creativity: The Glasgow Improvisers Orchestra and the Theater of Home. Oxford University Press, 2025. doi:10.1093/oso/9780197752838.001.0001
- Burke, Robert, and Andrys Onsman. Trust in the Art of Free Improvisation. Routledge, 2026. doi:10.4324/9781003614616

== Selected discography ==
- Gateway, with Tony Gould (1996)
- Wide Eyed, Rob Burke Quartet (2003)
- Do True, with Kenny Werner, Johannes Weidenmueller and Richie Barshay (2014)
- Shift, with George Lewis, Paul Grabowsky and Mark Helias (2017)
- Barlines and Beyond, with Debasis Chakraborty, Stephen Magnusson and Sam Evans (2017)
- The Gravity Project, with Paul Grabowsky and others (2018)
- Head Under Water, with Tony Malaby and Mark Helias (2018)
- Slip Sliding, with Ben Monder and Tom Rainey (2020)
- Dangerous Decision, with Raymond MacDonald, Paul Grabowsky, Nick Haywood and Antony Floyd (2022)
