= Judy Bailey (pianist) =

New Zealand pianist and composer (1935–2025)

Judy Bailey OAM
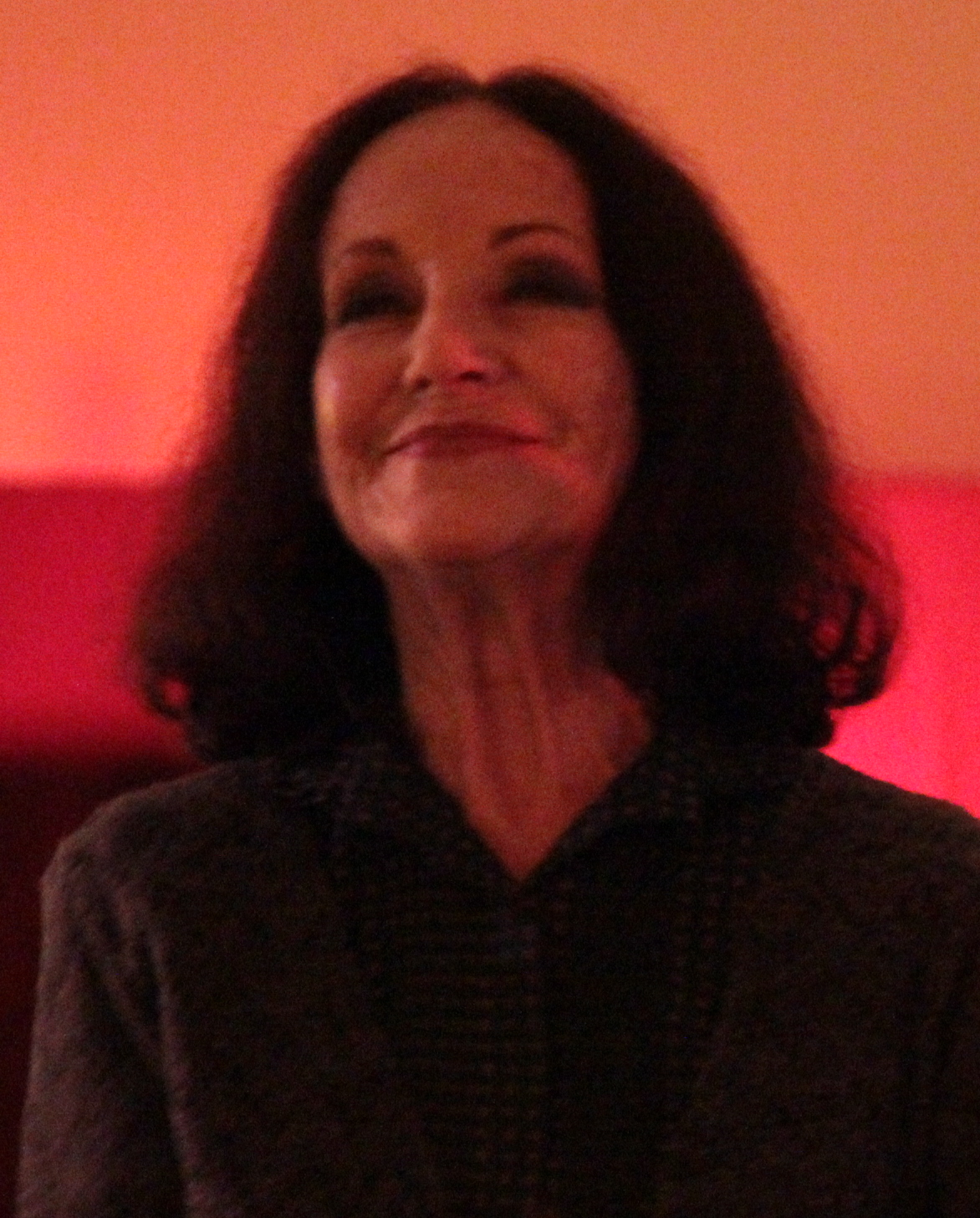
- Bailey in 2012

Background information
- Born: Judith Mary Bailey; 3 October 1935; Auckland, New Zealand
- Died: 8 August 2025 (aged 89) Willoughby, New South Wales, Australia
- Genres: Jazz, soundtrack, children's music, third stream
- Occupations: Musician; composer; arranger; director; lecturer
- Instrument: Piano
- Labels: CBS Records; HMV Records; Philips Records; Eureka Records; Sydney Conservatorium of Music; ABC Jazz; Tall Poppies Records

Judith Mary Bailey (3 October 1935 – 8 August 2025) was a New Zealand-born pianist, classical jazz musician, composer, arranger and senior lecturer who lived in Australia from 1960.

== Life and career ==
Bailey was born in Auckland on 3 October 1935, and raised in Whangārei. As a young child she learned ballet, followed by piano and theory when she was 10 years old. She graduated from Trinity College London when she was 16.

Bailey moved to Australia in 1960, spending most of her time in Sydney. She performed on TV, music venues such as the El Rocco, and on many recordings.

She served with Tommy Tycho's orchestra on the Seven Network.

Bailey was a senior lecturer in jazz composition and jazz piano at the Sydney Conservatorium of Music where she commenced in 1973, and was also musical director of the Sydney Youth Jazz Ensemble (Jazz Connection).

In 1973, Bailey became the pianist on the Australian Broadcasting Corporation children's radio show Kindergarten, which often featured presenters from Play School

In 2017, rapper Rick Ross with producer Bink sampled Bailey's "Colour of My Dreams" from the Judy Bailey Quartet album Colours. The sample was used on Ross's track "Santorini Greece" on the album Rather You Than Me.

Bailey was a represented artist of the Australian Music Centre.

She died in Willoughby, Sydney, New South Wales on 8 August 2025, at the age of 89.

== Discography ==
=== Albums ===
List of albums, with selected details
Title	Details
The Wind (The Errol Buddle Quartet featuring Judy Bailey)	Released: 1962; Format: LP; Label: His Master's Voice (OCLP 7594)
You & The Night & The Music	Released: 1964; Format: LP; Label: CBS (BP233126)
My Favourite Things	Released: 1965; Format: LP; Label: CBS (BP233263)
One Moment	Released: 1974; Format: LP; Label: Philips (MX173238)
Colours	Released: 1976; Format: LP; Label: Eureka (E-103)
Solo	Released: 1978; Format: LP; Label: Eureka (E-107)
Notwithstanding	Released: 1992; Format: CD; Label: ABC JAZZ (510 600-2)
Sundial	Released: 1993; Format: CD; Label: ABC JAZZ (4797182)
The Spritely Ones	Released: September 2001; Format: CD; Label: Tall Poppies (TP159)
Speakeasy	Released: 2001; Format: CD; Label: Judy Bailey
Pendulum	Released: 2007; Format: CD; Label: Creative Vibes (BL017)
Jazz Legends: Judy Bailey	Released: 2011; Format: 4×CD; Label: ABC Jazz (476 4515)
Another Journey	Released: August 2018; Format: 2×CD, digital; Label: Sydney Conservatorium Of Music

== Awards and honours ==
- 2004: Medal of the Order of Australia (OAM) "for service to jazz music and education."
- 2008: Award for Distinguished Services to Australian Music at the Annual Classical Music Awards.
- 2017: Awarded an Honorary Doctorate from the University of Sydney
- 2022: Australia Council Don Banks Music Award

=== ARIA Music Awards ===
The ARIA Music Awards are annual awards which recognise excellence, innovation and achievement across all genres of Australian music. They commenced in 1987.

Year	Nominee / work	Award	Result	Ref.
1993	Notwithstanding	Best Jazz Album	Nominated	
1994	Sundial	Best Jazz Album	Nominated	

=== Sir Bernard Heinze Memorial Award ===
The Sir Bernard Heinze Memorial Award is given to a person who has made an outstanding contribution to music in Australia.

Year	Nominee / work	Award	Result	Ref.
2018	Judy Bailey	Sir Bernard Heinze Memorial Award	awarded	

=== Australian Jazz Bell Awards ===
The Australian Jazz Bell Awards, also known as the Bell Awards or The Bells, are annual music awards for the jazz music genre in Australia.

Year	Nominee / work	Award	Result (wins only)
2014	Judy Bailey	Hall of Fame	inducted

=== Mo Awards ===
The Australian Entertainment Mo Awards (commonly known informally as the Mo Awards) were annual Australian entertainment industry awards. They recognised achievements in live entertainment in Australia from 1975 to 2016. Bailey won one award in that time.

Year	Nominee / work	Award	Result (wins only)
1991	Judy Bailey	Jazz Performer of the Year (Female)	Won
