= Charlie Munro =

New Zealand jazz reedist and flautist

Charles Robert Munro (22 May 1917, in Christchurch – 9 December 1985, in Sydney) was a jazz reedist and flautist born in New Zealand but based chiefly out of Australia.

Munro moved to Sydney when he was 21, and played in the bands of Myer Norman and Wally Parks in addition to work as a sideman on various nightclub, theater, and ship gigs. He served in the military during World War II, then worked with Wally Norman at the Roosevelt nightclub in Sydney. He played with Bob Gibson in 1950, then joined the Australian Broadcasting Commission's dance band in 1954, continuing to work with the group through 1976 as a composer, performer, and arranger. He worked extensively with Bryce Rohde in the 1960s, participating in many of Rohde's Australian jazz experiments. He led his own bands toward the end of his career, and also worked with Georgina de Leon.

== Discography as leader ==
- Eastern Horizons (1967)
- Count Down (1969)
- Integrations (1981)
