= Harry Stein (communist) =

Australian communist and jazz enthusiast (1919–1994)

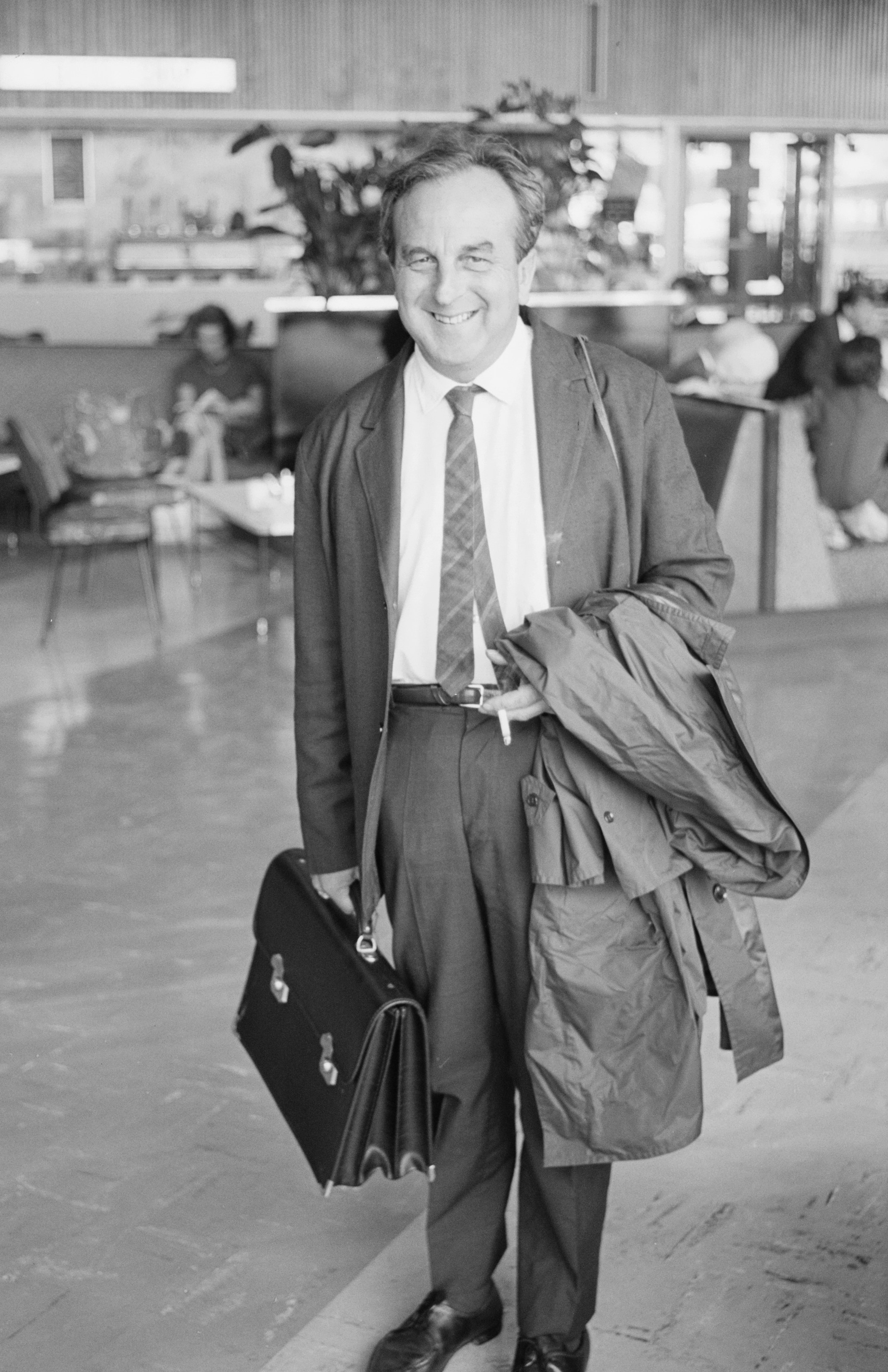
- Stein in 1967
- Born: 1919; Melbourne, Australia
- Died: 1994 (aged 74–75)
- Occupations: Musician; writer
- Political party: Communist (1936–1968); Labor (from 1968)

Harry Stein (1919–1994) was an Australian communist, jazz enthusiast and writer. Stein was an active member of the Communist Party of Australia until 1968 and worked as a journalist for the party's newspaper. He also played an important role in the early promotion of jazz music in Australia. The Herald once described Stein as a "jazz-crazed Communist whose chief attribute is his ability to talk fluently on anything, at any place, at any time."

== Life ==
Harry Stein was born in 1919 in Melbourne, Australia, to Jewish immigrants from Safed, Mandatory Palestine, and was one of three children. The Stein family were religious and Harry's father, Abraham Stein, was a presser and later worked at a synagogue in Carlton. Growing up during the Great Depression, Stein experienced the poverty of the era and left school at age 13. These hardships led Stein to join the Victorian Young Communist League and, in 1936, the Communist Party of Australia (CPA).

He worked a series of menial jobs, some of which were connected to the theatre. At age 18, he took a job as a ship's steward and sailed to England. He returned to Australia in 1938 and started working full time for the CPA.

Stein was leader of the Eureka Youth League, a group affiliated with the CPA, and in 1945 founded the Eureka Hot Jazz Society. Stein had played the drums since the 1930s and was known for his enthusiasm for jazz. He was influenced by discussions he had heard in England regarding the connection between music and Marxism. In Australia, Stein gave talks about the social background of jazz music. In December 1946, Stein organised the first Australian Jazz Convention.

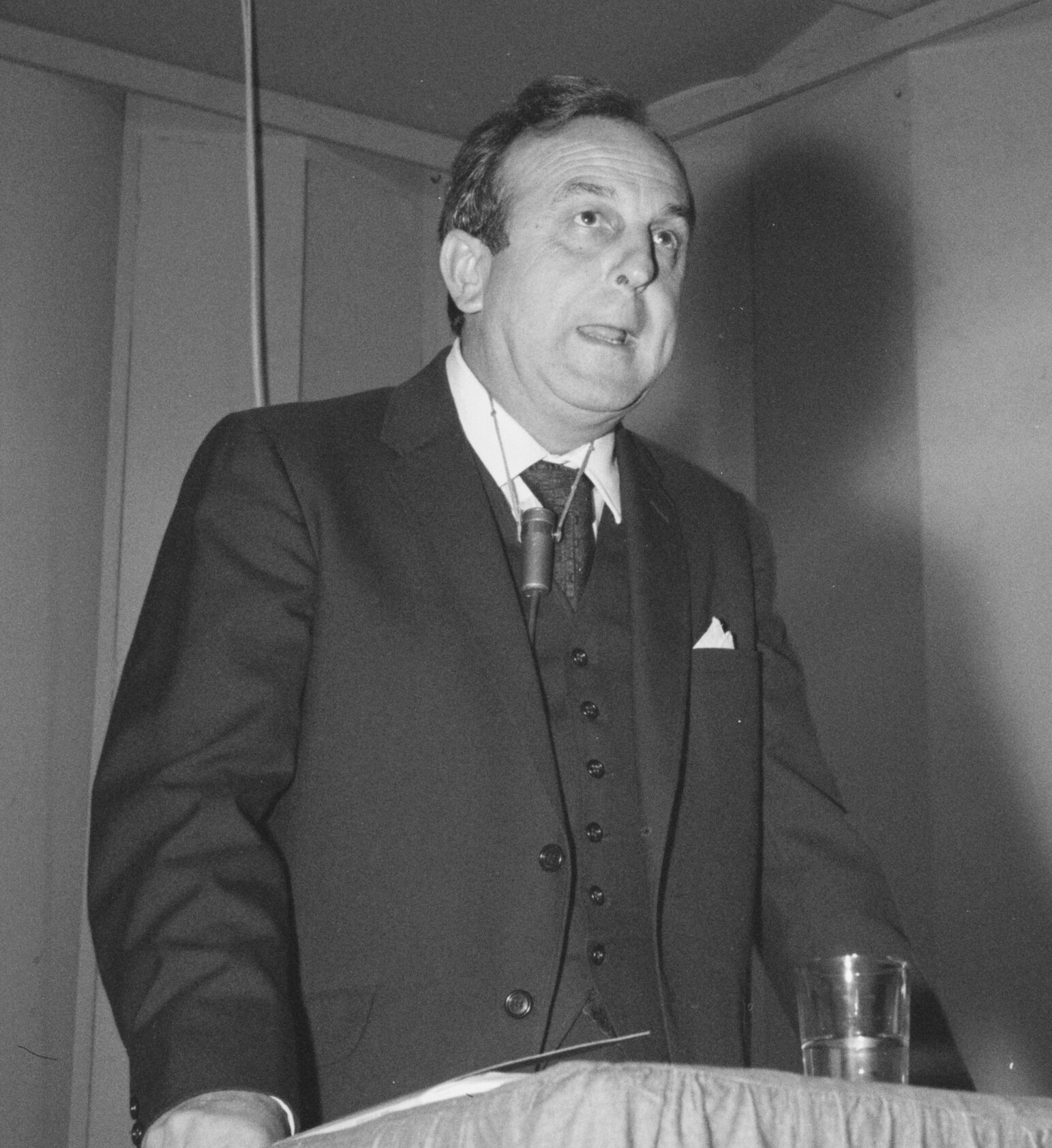
Stein reporting on his visit to South Vietnam (1 January 1967)

Stein had a long association with Graeme Bell and his band who played at Eureka Youth League functions throughout the 1940s. Stein allowed the League's premises to be used as a jazz club known as the Uptown Club. In 1947, Stein accompanied Bell's band to play at a leftist youth convention in Prague under the sponsorship of the Eureka Youth League. Despite the Communist Party's denunciation of jazz in the 1950s, Stein remained a supporter of the music.

Stein later worked for the communist newspaper Tribune and was the paper's parliamentary press gallery representative. Reporting for the paper at a 1967 press conference for South Vietnamese Prime Minister Nguyễn Cao Kỳ, Stein challenged Kỳ about the supposed unpopularity of the Viet Cong. Kỳ, who was visiting Australia at the time, responded by inviting Stein to visit South Vietnam and even offered Stein a seat on his own flight back. Stein subsequently toured South Vietnam for a week as Kỳ's guest. On return to Australia, Stein said that Kỳ "hadn't much to say about what goes on in his country – the Americans make decisions for him." Kỳ confessed later that he "didn't really know [Stein] was a Communist".

Following the Soviet Union's invasion of Czechoslovakia in 1968, Stein left the CPA. He joined the Labor Party and was press secretary to Minister for Urban Affairs Tom Uren.

Stein never married nor had any children. He died in 1994 just before his autobiography, A Glance over an Old Left Shoulder: Harry Stein Remembers, was published.

== Political views ==
Stein supported Soviet-style communism. He was critical of the Soviet Jewry movement, viewing it as a tool to attack communism. In 1963, Stein wrote a pamphlet claiming there was no anti-Semitism in the Soviet Union.

== Works ==
- Blowing at the Blowhole: Jazz Alive in Kiama (1992, Kiama Jazz Club; OCLC 38320122)
- A Glance Over an Old Left Shoulder: Harry Stein Remembers (1994, Hale & Iremonger; ISBN 0-86806-547-1)
