= Frank Smith (musician) =

Australian jazz musician (1927–1974)

- Born: 30 June 1927
- Died: February 18, 1974 (aged 46)
- Genres: jazz
- Instrument: saxophone
- Formerly of: The Music Maker 1957 All Stars, The Don Burrows Sextet, The Don Burrows Six, The Embers Quintet, Frank Smith Quartet

Frank Smith (30 June 1927 – 18 February 1974) was an Australian jazz musician and TV composer.

== Career ==
Frank Smith was born in Sydney in 1927. He first performed in a group led by his father, and learnt saxophone from Ralph Pommer, an alto saxophonist.

In 1947 Smith joined a band led by Gaby Rogers, before working at the Sydney Trocadero with Frank Coughlan in the mid-1950s. He won Best Alto Saxophonist in Music Maker magazine's poll in 1957, and recorded for the album Music Maker 1957 All Stars.

When The Embers club was opened in Melbourne in 1959, Smith left Sydney to lead the club band until 1961, when Ted Nettelbeck took over. Smith went onto join the band for The Graham Kennedy Show, before starting Frank Smith Productions and working in advertising and composing TV theme songs, such as those for Bellbird and Hunter. He also formed the record label Havoc Records with Rod De Courcy in 1970, who put out early releases by Billy Thorpe and the Aztecs, and a mix of rock, folk, and soundtrack music. Later, a compilation of every Havoc single was released in 2008.

Smith died of a heart attack at the beginning of 1974, leaving behind few recorded works, apart from the incidental underscore throughout the Hunter series. A memorial concert, compered by Bert Newton, was held to raise money for Smith's wife and five children, and was broadcast live on TV, during which a number of Crawford regular actors sang or displayed their musical abilities.

He was a mentor or influence for Graeme Lyall, Graham Morgan, Alan Turnbull, Ted Nettlebeck, Barry Duggan, and Bernie McGann. He was considered Australia's answer to American jazz musician Charlie Parker, and during his time at The Embers, touring American musicians sent word back home of Smith's impressive playing.
