= Harry Jacobs (conductor) =

English musician

Henry Osborne Jacobs (13 July 1888 – 17 January 1988) was an English musician best known as an accompanist, arranger and conductor for Ada Reeve, then settled in Australia, where he had a substantial career.

== Career ==
Jacobs was born in Edgbaston, England, a son of musician Solomon Jacobs and his wife Louisa Jane Jacobs, née Stockham (1856–1928). Educated at Catholic schools, he showed early promise as a musician, though he had no formal training. At age 20 he was hired as accompanist, bandleader and arranger by the music-hall star Ada Reeve, as a member of her company touring Britain, South Africa and America. They toured Australia in 1914 and again in 1917–18, when Jacobs was billed as a comedian, and as "the singing conductor". He also proved to have talent as an actor. Their stay in Australia and New Zealand amounted to over a year, perhaps due to the War, but remained highly popular, and performed at many patriotic events.

Reeve returned to Australia once more, for the Fuller brothers' revue "Spangles", billed as her final world tour. "Spangles" ran in Melbourne from 15 April to 10 November 1922 at the Princess Theatre, a record-setting 230 performances, then at Fullers' New Theatre in Castlereagh Street, Sydney, from 2 December 1922 to February 1923, when she had to retire due to her health failing.

The "Spangles" troupe broke up and Jacobs decided to settle in Australia, initially as conductor at Sydney's Opera House. Before leaving England he had married "Lucie Linda", a dancer in Reeve's troupe, and whose mother was Reeve's wardrobe mistress. They soon moved to Melbourne, and by 1930 were living in the suburb of Elwood.

He was seldom out of work: he conducted the New Palace Theatre orchestra for the Fuller brothers and Hugh J. Ward in such hits as Tons of Money. In September 1923 he conducted the orchestra accompanying the silent movie Robin Hood for the grand opening of Melbourne's Princess Theatre, and was musical director for the Fuller company's pantomime Mother Goose scored by Hamilton Webber. and Rickards' Tivoli Theatre a year later.

He conducted J. C. Williamson's Opera Company for producer Minnie Everett during their 1926 Gilbert and Sullivan season, when the usual conductor Gustave Slapoffski was unavailable.

On 12 November 1927 the new Palais Pictures cinema opened at St Kilda, with Jacobs as musical director and conductor. Jacobs continued conducting the Palais orchestra until 1949, and retired in 1951.

He also worked with some of the notable Australian film directors of the 1930s: he wrote orchestral arrangements of Mrs Varney Monk's score of F. W. Thring's musical Collits' Inn; he wrote and conducted the score for Charles Chauvel's film Heritage.

In the chancy world of show business, Jacobs was never unemployed. He won respect from orchestra members for his sound musicianship. Theatre and radio managers could rely on him. He was always sober, cheerful and polite; he led a quiet life in suburban Brighton, where he served as a vestryman at St Andrew’s Church of England. . . . In later years he worked as music librarian for the Tivoli and for Crawford Television Productions, and directed, arranged and conducted Melbourne’s Carols by Candlelight concerts. At eighty years of age he still accompanied his wife’s Australian National Theatre ballet school classes.

== Compositions ==
- "Come to Toyland" for the "Spangles" tour.

== Family ==
Jacobs married Violet Lucie Maud Bishop in England on 7 February 1921. As "Lucie Linda", and from 1922 "Saronova", she was a dancer in Reeve's company, and later, as "Madame Saronova", (Note: Also "Lucie Saronova". Equally spelled "Saranova", even in advertisements.) a teacher of ballet at the Australian National Theatre Ballet School in St Kilda. In 1934 she was appointed an examiner for the Cecchetti branch of the Imperial Society of Teachers of Dancing, London. They had a home at 17 Harwood street, Elwood, Victoria.

In 1987 the couple celebrated their 66th wedding anniversary at ages 99 and 87. They had one daughter, Wendy Lee Jacobs, possibly born 20 August 1924. (Note: This date is supported by The Australian Jewish Herald but elsewhere reported as 18 years old in 1939, and in 1944.) Wendy was a featured skater at the opening on 10 March 1939 of the St Moritz Ice Rink, while her father conducted the orchestra. She married Linley C(ornelius) P(rine) Selover on 26 October 1946.
