= Willie "The Lion" McIntyre =

Australian jazz pianist (1919–1987)

Willie "the Lion" McIntyre
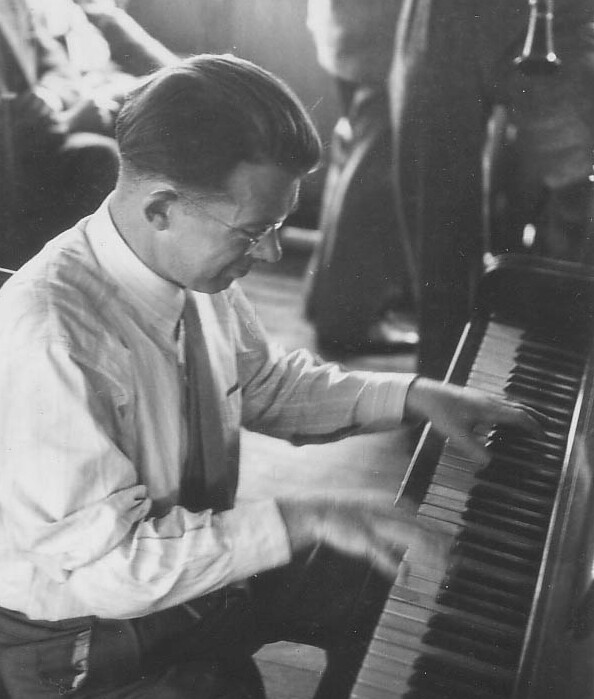
- McIntyre playing piano on a riverboat cruise, c. 1946–49

Background information
- Also known as: "The Lion"
- Born: William Landale McIntyre; 24 May 1919; Benalla, Victoria, Australia
- Died: 1 September 1987 (aged 68) Glen Iris, Victoria, Australia
- Genre: jazz
- Instrument: piano

William Landale "the Lion" McIntyre (24 May 1919 – 11 September 1987) was an Australian jazz pianist.

== Career ==
Born in Benalla, Victoria, William Landale McIntyre moved to Melbourne in 1937 and formed a dance trio with saxophonist Laurie Cowan, drummer Wes Brown, and himself on piano. After playing in several small groups, McIntyre became established in Melbourne's traditional jazz scene.

After serving in World War II, McIntyre returned to Australia and helped organise the first Australian Jazz Convention in 1946, and co-founded the Portsea Trio with Bill Miller on washboard and George Tack on clarinet in 1947.

During his work in the 1950s, McIntyre inspired others to take up the piano, such as Phil Sandford, who would later write a biography on McIntyre. Fellow pianist Dick Hughes also listed McIntyre as an influence, and pianist Ted Nettelbeck said hearing McIntyre's band play started his own interest in jazz too.

McIntyre is thought to have given himself the nickname "The Lion", after American jazz pianist Willie "The Lion" Smith. He used the name as early as the 1940s, and into the 1950s.

Outside of music, McIntyre worked for Victorian Public Service during his teens, and later for a company manufacturing waterproofing products. He retired from jazz in the 1960s, but occasionally performed into the 1970s.

On 11 September 1987, William Landale McIntyre died aged 68.
