= Ben Eunson =

Australian guitarist

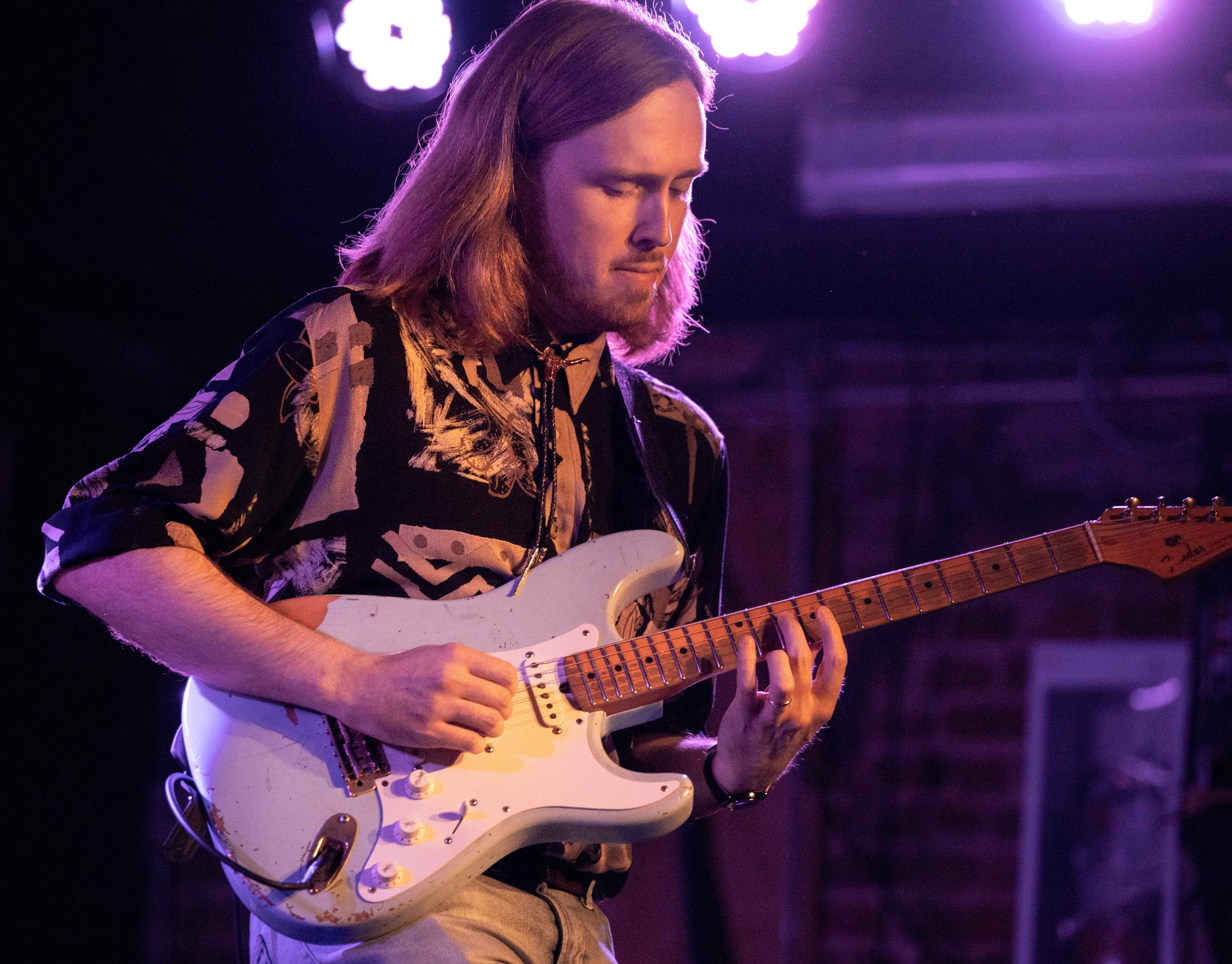

Background information
- Born: Melbourne, Australia
- Genres: Jazz, Rock, R&B
- Occupation: Musician
- Instrument: Guitar
- Years active: 2010s – present
- Labels: Ocean Road Sounds, Seed Music
- Website: www.beneunson.com

Ben Eunson (born 1989) is an Australian guitarist. Described by Guitar Player as “innovative” and having “already had the career of a seasoned veteran”, Eunson released his EP Autumn in 2015, followed by his debut solo album ACE in 2019.

== Background ==
Ben Eunson began playing guitar at age 10, and from age 15 was working professionally in local jazz and rock clubs in Melbourne.

After relocating to the United States in his early 20s, he began playing regularly in New York’s West Village Jazz clubs. Eunson recorded his debut EP Autumn in February 2014 with Sean Wayland, Alexander Claffy and Kush Abadey. Eunson released his full-length studio debut album ACE in 2019, this time featuring collaborators Claffy and Abadey in an instrumental trio format.

Eunson has toured extensively with Terri Lyne Carrington, and has worked alongside a wide array of artists including John Legend, Queen Latifah, Questlove, Chad Lefkowitz-Brown, Myron Walden and Theo Croker, among others. Eunson has performed extensively throughout the United States and worldwide, performing at the Monterey Jazz Festival, the Detroit International Jazz Festival, The Hollywood Bowl, and more.

== Practicing and style ==
Eunson stated that he started to take practice very seriously at the age of 17 and claims to have consistently practiced 8 hours a day for 6 years until the age of 23. He would divide his practice hours into one or two hour slots in which he would focus on one concept. He has said that he still finds time to practice extensively, saying in 2016: "On a good day, I practice for 7 hours. On a bad day, I only get 4 hours in. But it usually averages out to around 6 hours a day, 6 out of 7 days a week. On Sundays, I take a break and only do 1 hour of maintenance practice. So that comes out to about 37 hours practice a week, and about 26 days of serious practice in a month."

Eunson's playing style has been described as "angular but melodically focused", and he is known for playing a Fender Stratocaster guitar. He cites Pat Metheny, George Benson, Andy Summers, Jeff Beck, Ralph Towner, Keith Jarrett and Joe Henderson among his early influences.

== Discography ==
=== As leader ===
- 2015: Autumn [EP] (Seed Music)
- 2019: ACE (Ocean Road Sounds)

=== As sideman ===
- David Weiss - When Words Fail (Motema, 2014)
- Theo Croker - DVRKFUNK [EP] (Sony/Okeh 2015)
- Nick Brust - Brooklyn Folk Songs (2015)
- Alexander Claffy - Claffy (Ropeadope, 2016)
- Michael Blume - When I Get It Right (S-Curve/BMG, 2016)
- Theo Croker - Escape Velocity (Sony/Okeh, 2016)
- Andy Sugg - Wednesdays at M's (2016)
- Sean Wayland - Aussie Tribute Band (2016)
- Sean Wayland - Foodland (2016)
- Andrew Van Tassel - It's Where You Are (Tone Rogue, 2016)
- Kathleen Potton - Nero (2017)
- David Weiss - Wake Up Call (Ropeadope, 2017)
- Sterling Rhyne - Remedy (Single) (2017)
- Jessi Lee - Deep Rest (2018)
- Elise LeGrow - Playing Chess (S-Curve/BMG, 2018)
- Naz+ - Cove (Single) (2019)
- Chad Lefkowitz-Brown - Chad LB & Sonic Magic (Sound Frame Records, 2019)
