= Sarah Maclaine =

Australian jazz singer and songwriter

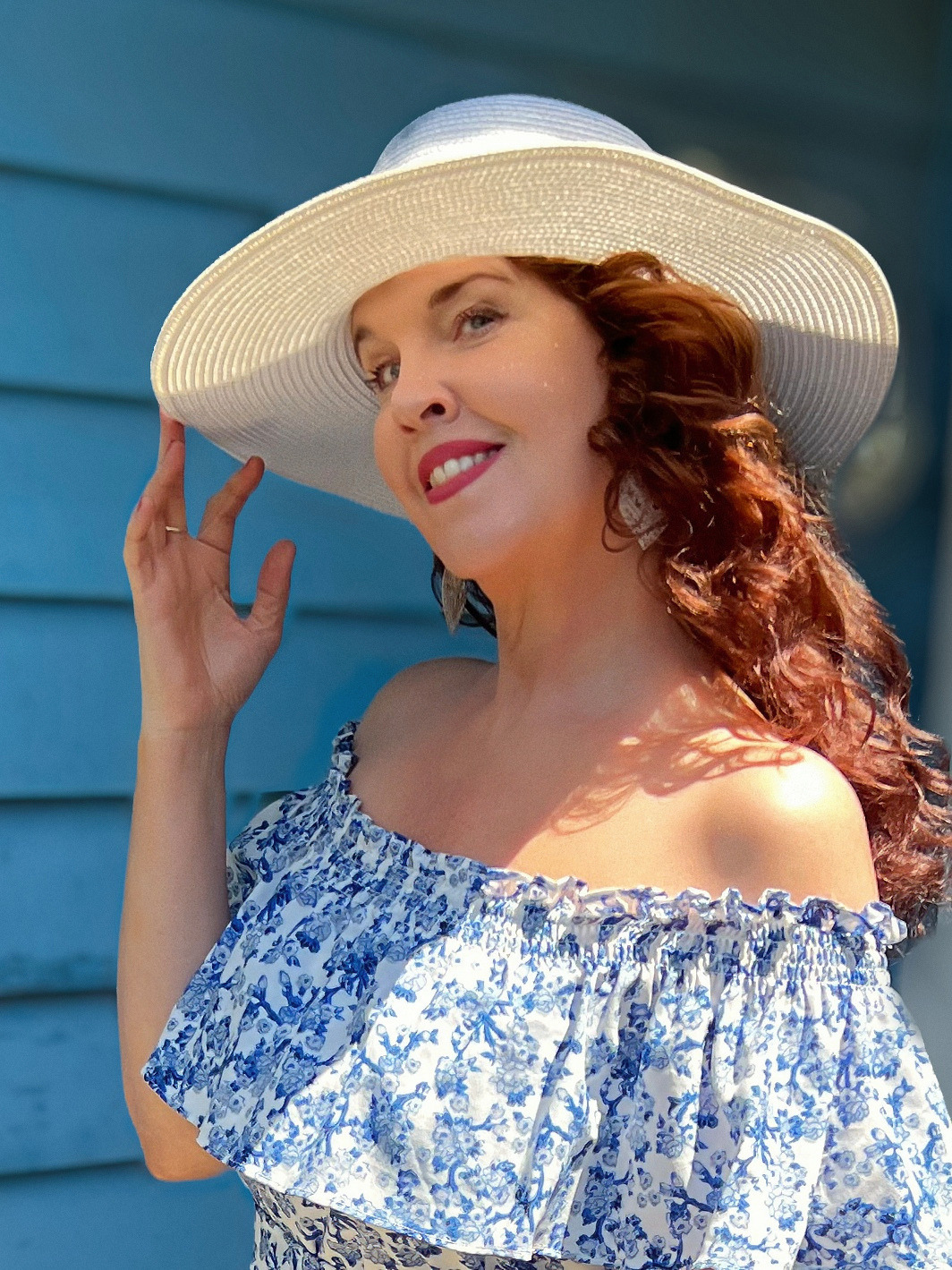
- Sarah Maclaine in 2025
- Occupations: Singer; Songwriter
- Years active: 1997–present
- Notable work: The Heart of Me (album)
- Website: sarahmaclaine.com

Sarah Maclaine is an Australian singer and songwriter. She is known for performing regularly on Good Morning Australia. She is also a performer at international jazz festivals. She has released an album titled The Heart of Me.

== Career ==
In 1997 Maclaine started performing on Good Morning Australia, hosted by Bert Newton. She sang on the show regularly until it stopped airing in 2006, appearing approximately eighty times over that period.

As well as Good Morning Australia, she has also appeared and sung on other television shows such as Hey Hey It's Saturday; Denise Drysdale's morning programme Denise; the Good Friday Appeal; the Australian Football League's Brownlow Medal. She has also featured in a number of television commercials.

She has performed at various international festivals and events like the 2006 Commonwealth Games Premiers Dinner, the Melbourne International Jazz Festival, the Stonnington Jazz Festival, the Melbourne Music Festival, the Australian Formula One Grand Prix, many performances for the AFL's Brownlow Medal and the Ford Australia Annual Awards dinner hosted by Craig Lowndes.

Maclaine is also a songwriter. As well as writing her own songs, she has also collaborated with drummer Liberty DeVitto for the song "Drifting".

She has performed and worked with entertainers such as Peter Cupples (Stylus) and Ross Wilson (Daddy Cool/Mondo Rock).
