= Andrew Bisset =

- Born: 20 January 1953
- Origin: Canberra, Australian Capital Territory, Australia
- Died: 14 April 2005 (aged 52)
- Occupation(s): Author, music educator, singer

Andrew Bisset (20 January 1953 – 14 April 2005) was an Australian author, music educator and singer, based in Canberra.

== Author ==
Andrew Bisset wrote Black Roots White Flowers – A History of Jazz in Australia (11 November 1979), which traces Australian jazz influences and performances from 1918 and the early days of visiting African American vaudeville shows and jazz teas at the Tivoli, through to the year of its publication. According to The Canberra Times' Michael Foster it is "the first serious study of jazz in Australia." As a follow-up, Bisset presented a ten-part series on ABC Radio National in 1987, History of Australian Jazz up to World War Two.

Bob Dixon, also from The Canberra Times, reviewed the re-publication of Bisset's book in 1987; he described how "early chapters deal with the 1910s and 1920s and are mostly a dullish catalogue of dance bands, which could only by a real stretch of the imagination be said to play jazz. It is interesting to read, though, that several Negro bands were refused permission to visit Australia in the 1920s, because of our racial policy." Dixon felt "one could sometimes wish for more information on what style of music a certain band played. But there is excellent description of a number of modern musicians."

== Performer ==
As performer, Bisset was loved for his natural stage presence, dry humour and wit, and uncanny sense of comic timing and delivery. His theme song in later years became My Baby Just Cares for Me. Audiences also craved his version of Bobby McFerrin's Don't Worry Be Happy, in which he sang the lead during his time with a cappella group The Singing Waiters.

Bisset suffered from a severe arthritic condition for most of his life, but he never allowed this or other medical problems that emerged later on to impede his love of life and his unstoppable energy and enthusiasm for getting things done.
