= Grace Funston =

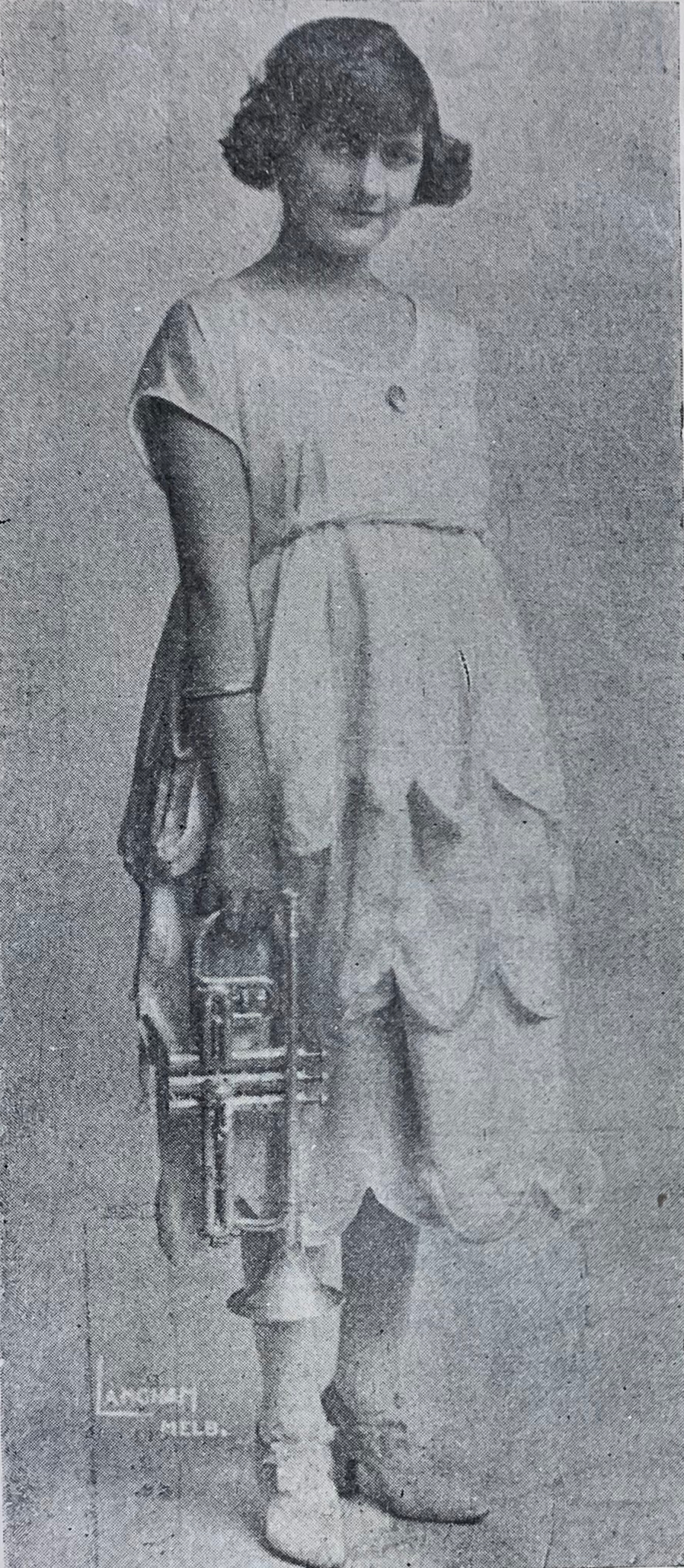
- Grace Funston 1923

Background information
- Also known as: Gaye Funston
- Born: 1900
- Died: 1984
- Occupation: Musician
- Instrument(s): trumpet, saxophone, flute, piano, cornet

Grace "Gaye" Teresa Funston (1900-1984) was an Australian musician and, along with her sister Sella Funston, a member of the all-female dance band the Magpies Ladies Orchestra in 1913.

== Career ==
Grace Funston's parents, Edward and Laura, were both amateur musicians and formed their own orchestra made up on their nine children. Grace Funston sang and played piano from an early age, later taking up cornet at the age of eight. In 1909 the Funston family moved to Melbourne from Sydney, and Grace began attending Sacred Heart Convent in Malvern. She played the cornet in a public concert for the first time the following year, and The Funston Family Orchestra began putting on regular charity concerts in the area, which would attracted an audience of passersby.

When the classical pianist Madame Cecilia Summerhayes heard about the family's concerts, she decided to form an all-female orchestra with the Funston daughters and others. They played opera, classics, and musical comedies as the Magpies Ladies Orchestra, with Grace Funston as their youngest member. One of the first performances by the orchestra was for Lady Denman, wife of the Governor General of Australia, who gave them their name and her patronage, and they were soon playing regularly at functions, cafes, hotels, and theatres such as the Armadale Picture Theatre.

During the First World War, the Magpies Ladies Orchestra continued to give regular performances, and in 1917 toured Brisbane where they were considered a novelty of war time. After the war, in 1921, Grace Funston toured Tasmania for twelve months with three friends as the Harmonic Ladies Instrumental Quartette. She played cello, and cornet, as the group played a range of opera and jazz, and stayed on tour with various groups for the next five years, touring Australia and New Zealand.

In 1931, The Australian Woman's Mirror called her "probably the only women professional trumpet player in Australia", and wrote she had travelled with the J.C. Williamson companies, and had been first trumpet player in 25 musical comedies. Funston played saxophone, flute, piano, and cornet, but it was her trumpet playing that gained her attention in the newspapers. She joined the Alice Dolphin Orchestra on saxophone in 1938, and later performed in Harry Jacobs' women's orchestra at the Palais Picture Theatre between 1942 and 1949.

Grace Funston died 7 May 1984, and a scholarship was set up at University of Melbourne, funded from the sale of her apartment.

The Grace and Stella Funston archive is held at the Australian Performing Arts Collection in Melbourne, and contains diaries, unpublished manuscripts, photographs, and Grace Funston's ukulele.

== Gallery ==
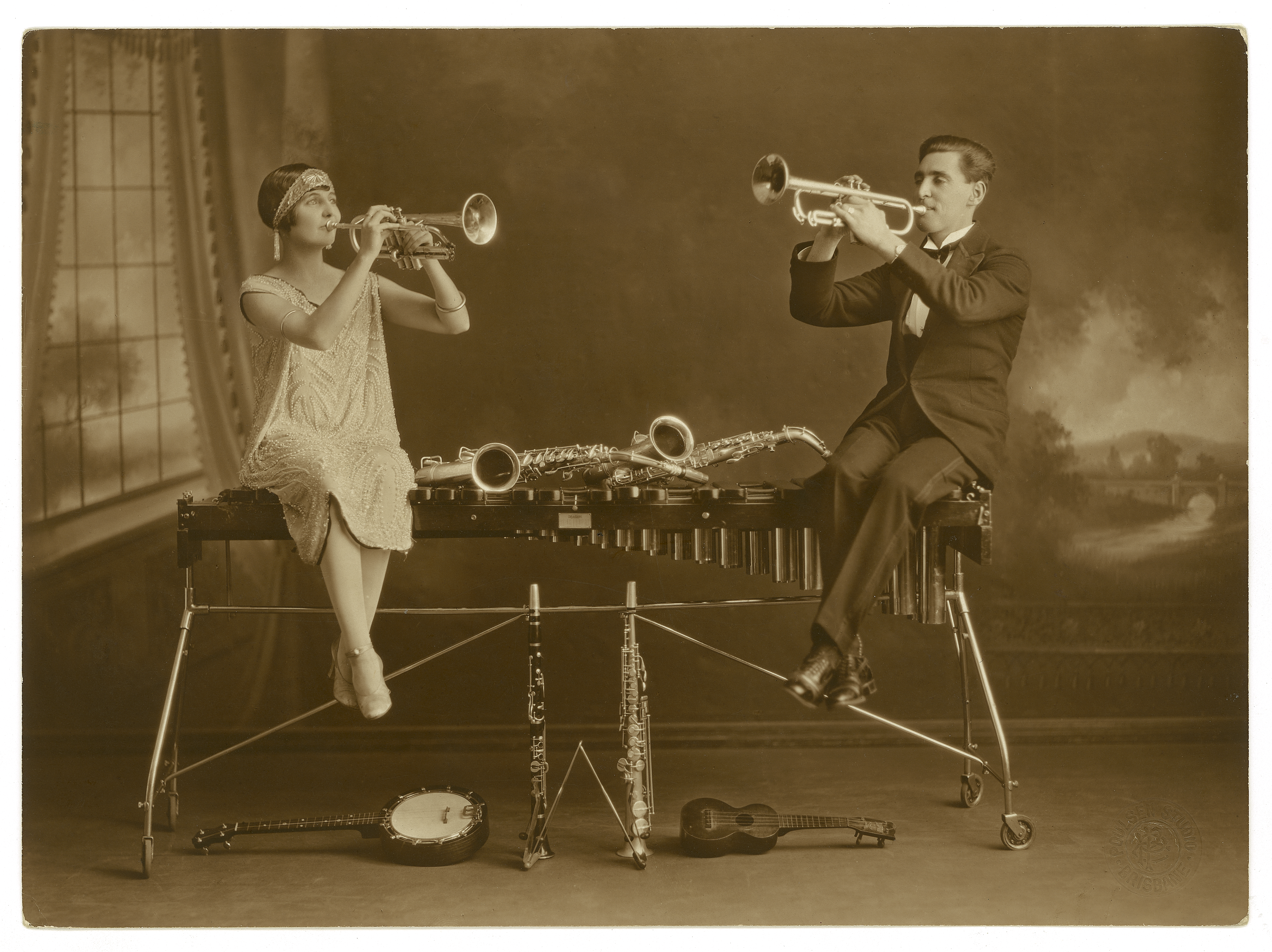
Grace Funston and Roy Brinsden performing in Pat Hanna's Diggers, Theatre Royal, Brisbane, 1926

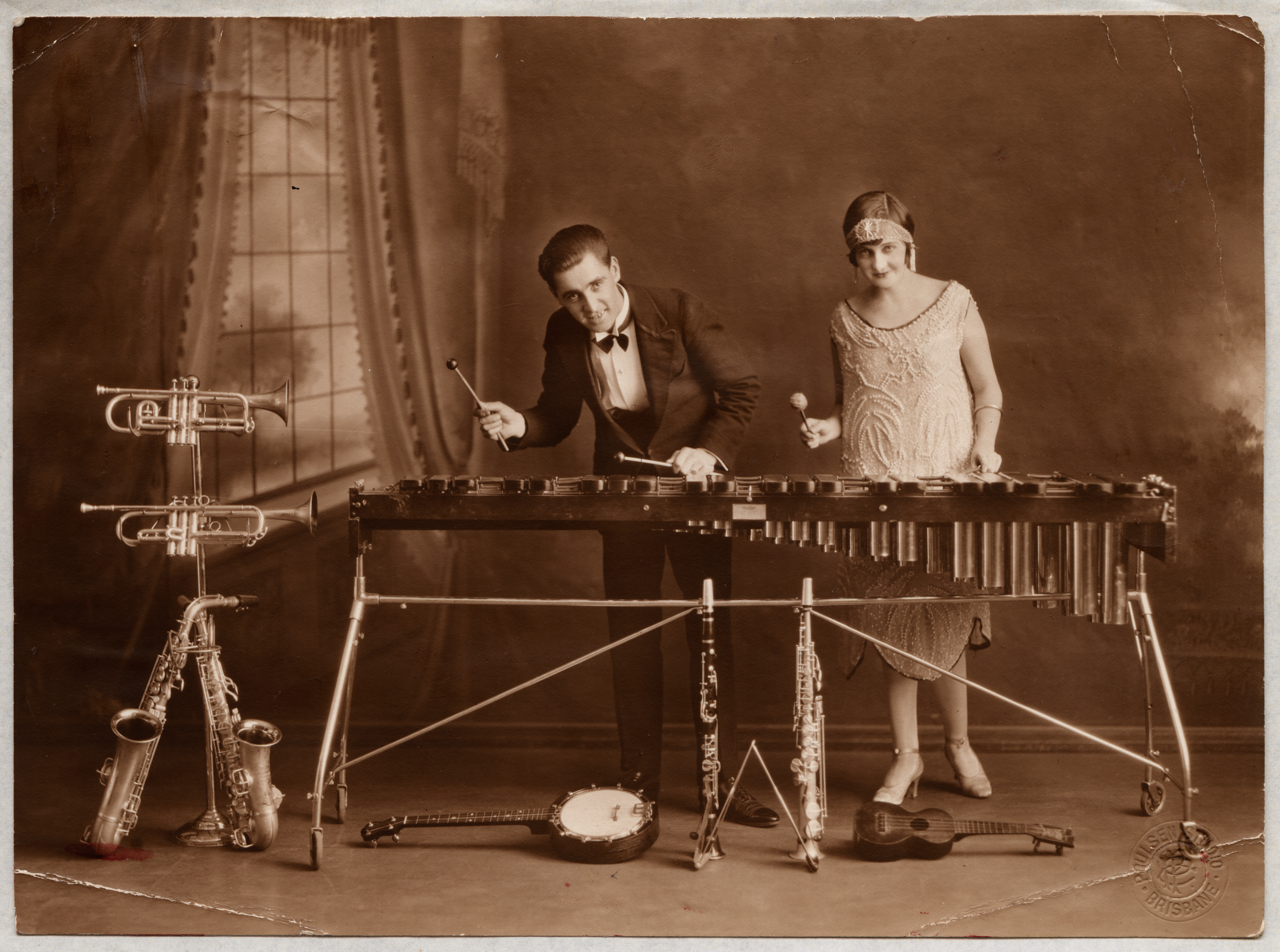
Grace Funston and Roy Brinsden performing in Pat Hanna's Diggers, Theatre Royal, Brisbane, 1926

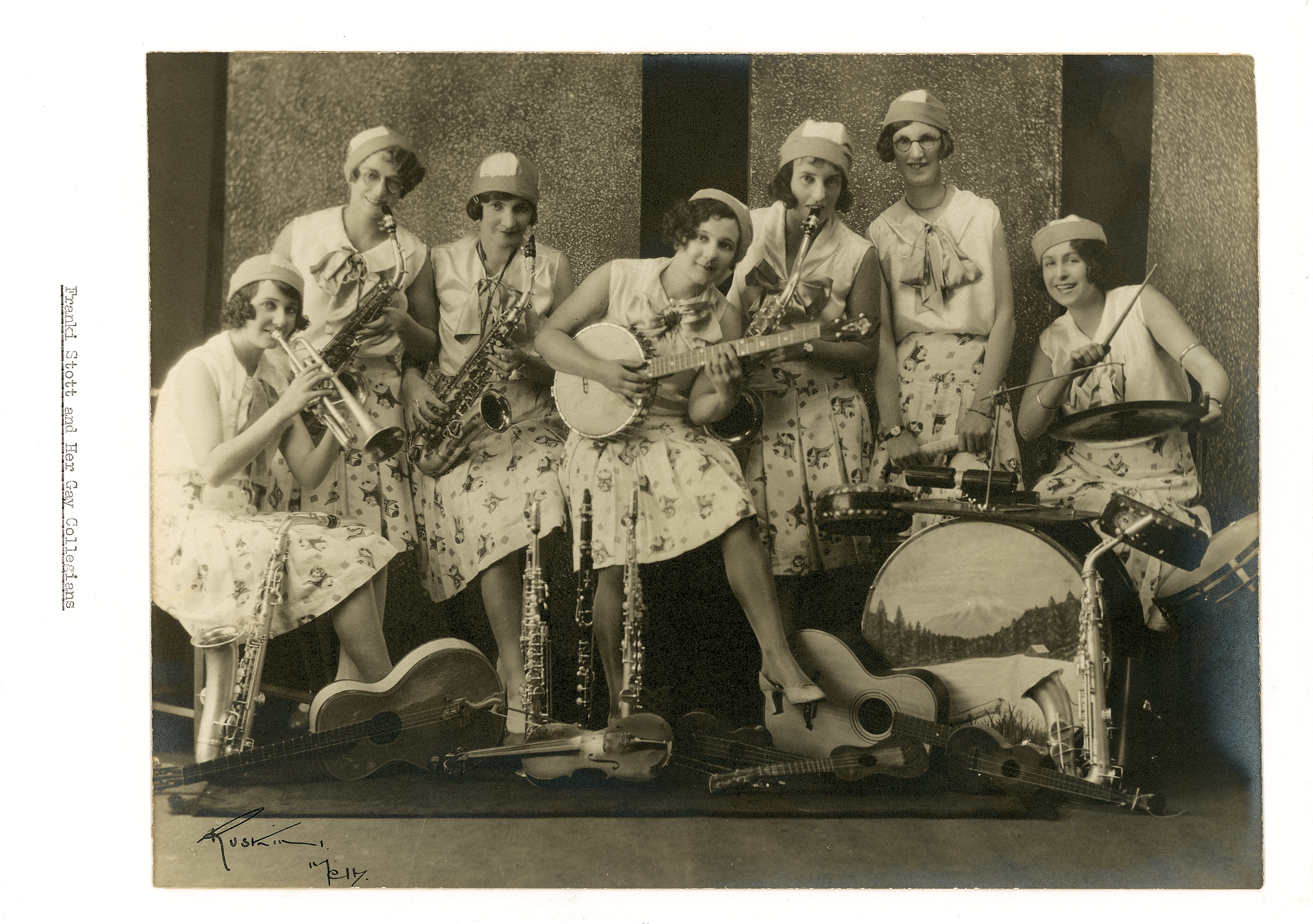
Franki Stott and Her Gay Collegians at the opening of their season at the Merri Dance Palais in North Fitzroy, 31 March 1930. The group includes: Grace Funston (trumpet), Stella Funston (saxophone), Franki Stott (banjo), Pat Robinson (piano) and Dora Lightfoot (drums).

Eve Rees' Merrymakers at the Mayoral Ball held at Caulfield Town Hall (date unknown). With Grace and Stella Funston.

Eve Rees' Merrymakers at the Mayoral Ball held at Caulfield Town Hall (date unknown). With Grace and Stella Funston.
