= Paul Furniss =

- Birth name: Paul Anthony Furniss
- Born: 27 November 1944 (age 80); Sydney, New South Wales, Australia
- Genres: Jazz
- Occupation: Musician
- Instruments: Saxophones (Clarinet)(soprano, alto, tenor); clarinet; flute; tin whistle
- Years active: 1968–present

Paul Anthony Furniss (born 27 November 1944) is an Australian jazz clarinetist and saxophonist. He has worked with Bob Learmonth, Geoff Bull, Graeme Bell and Tom Baker. He founded and led the Eclipse Alley Five and led the San Francisco Jazz Band after Tom Baker. He has played with many other musicians in the tradition jazz and swing idioms

== Biography ==
Furniss was born in Sydney. When he was seven years old he took up flute and recorder and four years later added the clarinet - later the saxophones. He attended the New South Wales Conservatorium of Music - later tutoring in the early years of the Jazz Course]. In April 1968 Furniss provided clarinet for Geoff Bull's Olympia Jazz Band alongside Bull on trumpet, Adrian Ford on piano, Peter Gallen on double bass, Dick Gillespie on drums, Geoff Holden on banjo and Chris Williams on trombone.

In 1987 Furniss performed Concerto for Soprano Saxophone and Orchestra written for him by John Colborne-Veel - the concerto had passages left for improvisation.

Michael Foster of The Canberra Times reviewed Graeme Bell's album, Pop Goes Graeme Bell, in December 1973 and observed, "Apart from Bell's piano, which generally drives the band along, I liked breaks and interpolations by [Furniss] on alto, clarinet, soprano sax, flute and, an instrument which crops up rarely and takes some mastery for effective use, tin whistle."

As a professional, he worked with Bob Learmonth, Bull, and Bell. He founded and led the Eclipse Valley Five and led the San Francisco Jazz Band after Tom Baker. He has played at jazz festivals in Australia and overseas]
