= Pat Caplice =

Australian jazz musician (1927–2025)

- Born: Patrick John Caplice; April 4, 1927; Sydney, New South Wales, Australia
- Died: January 13, 2025 (aged 97) Chatswood, New South Wales, Australia
- Genres: jazz
- Instruments: Vibraphone, drums

Patrick John Caplice (4 April 1927 – 13 January 2025) was an Australian jazz musician.

== Career ==
Caplice studied harmony at the New South Wales Conservatorium of Music from 1952 to 1955. During this time his two groups, the Pat Caplice Ensemble and the Pat Caplice Quintet, performed on the ABC's 2FC-NA radio stations. Caplice also performed with the Art Ray Quintet which released the album Midnight Melodies in 1952.

In 1954, the Pat Caplice Trio consisted of Jan Gold (guitar), Ken McClure (bass) and Caplice (vibraphone) and appeared on ABC radio. Caplice also worked with Jan Gold in the Pat Caplice Ensemble alongside John Morrow (bass), Ken Hardy (bass clarinet), Peter Richardson (flute) and Don Osborne (drums). The ensemble released their first recording, Mood Modern, in February 1957. In a review, The Sydney Morning Herald called the ensemble "one of the few Australian avant garde jazz groups, is reminiscent of the brilliant Swedish modernists more than the American school".

The Pat Caplice Trio continued to perform at clubs in Sydney and were noted for their experimentation in jazz instrumentation. In 1958, the trio expanded to include Mal Cunningham on flute and recorded as the Pat Caplice Quartet. Released by Columbia Records as Caprice: Adventures In Sound With Pat Caplice, the album was credited as the "first 12-inch long-playing record made by an Australian jazz band". ABC Weekly praised the album for displaying "the latest trends in jazz" and Caplice's ability to provide an atmosphere for his musicians to play their best.

Although Caplice's records were reviewed favourably and sold well at the time, his band did not receive enough work and disbanded.

During the mid-1950s, Caplice briefly worked at Sydney's 2UW radio station as a panel operator before returning to music. He also recorded as part of the Music Maker 1957 All-Stars, which featured Freddy Logan, Don Burrows and others and was voted Australia's best jazz musicians at the time.

Caplice died on 13 January 2025 at the age of 97 in Chatswood, New South Wales. He was buried at Macquarie Park Cemetery and Crematorium.

== Gallery ==
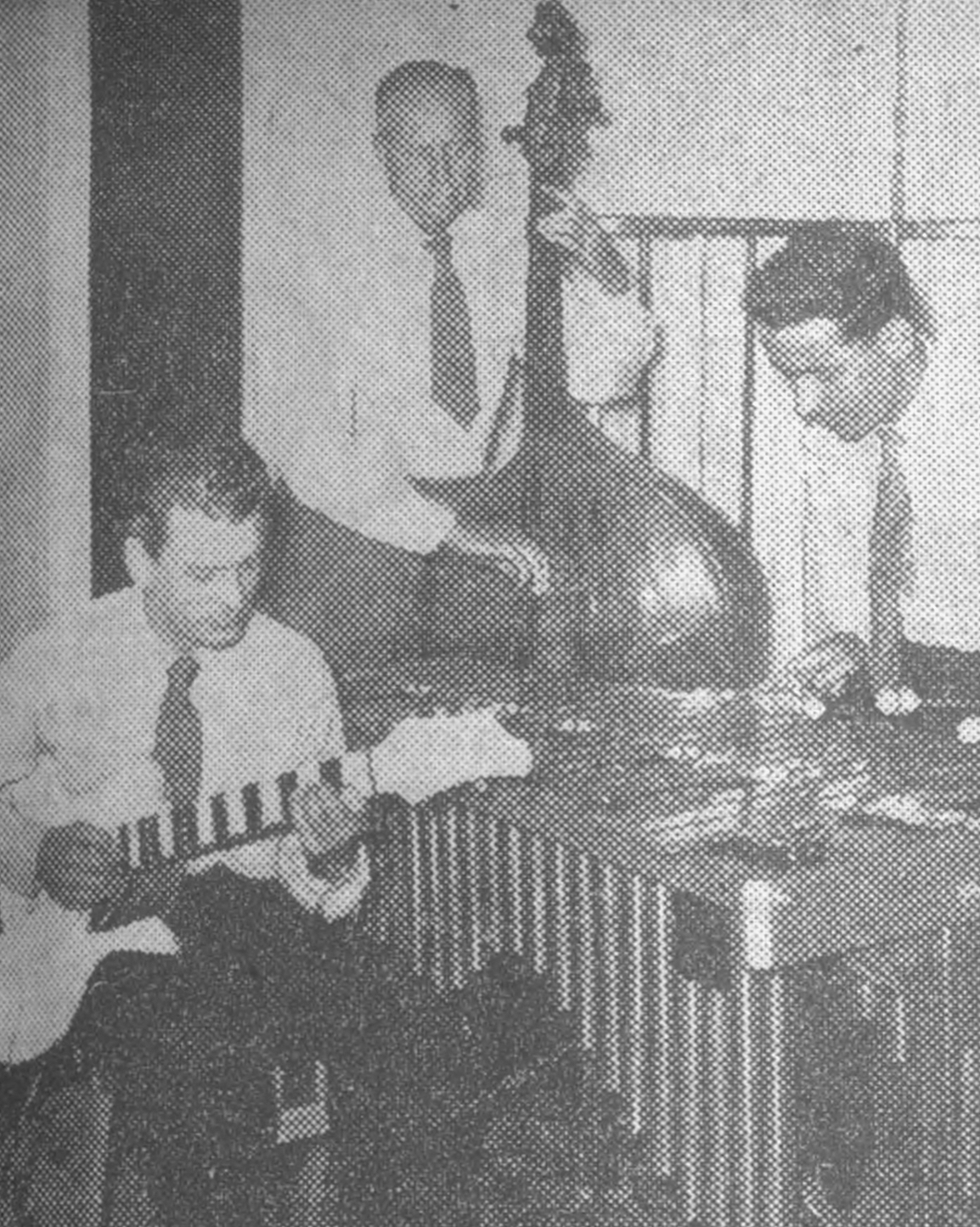
The Pat Caplice Trio in 1954. From left, Jan Gold, guitar; Ken McClure, bass; Caplice, vibraphone
