= ABC Jazz =

- Australia
- Frequencies: DAB+; DVB-T: Ch. 201; online

Programming
- Format: Jazz
- Network: ABC Radio

Ownership
- Owner: Australian Broadcasting Corporation

History
- First air date: 10 November 2004; 21 years ago
- Former names: Dig Jazz

Technical information
- Licensing authority: Australian Communications and Media Authority

Links
- Webcast: Live stream
- Website: abc.net.au/listen/jazz

ABC Jazz is a digital radio station, available on mobile devices, DAB+ digital radio, digital TV and online. It is operated by the ABC Jazz team at the Australian Broadcasting Corporation (ABC).

== History ==
ABC Jazz is a part of the Australian Broadcasting Corporation and jazz music programs was originally broadcast on ABC Classic. Dig Jazz was launched as a digital only station designed to broadcast a variety of different jazz styles including bebop, acid jazz, cool jazz and contemporary styles of jazz. Presenters include Mal Stanley, Megan Burslem, James Valentine and Monica Trapaga.

== Programming ==
ABC Jazz broadcasts jazz music from Australia and overseas continuously throughout the day. Its programming includes both presented programs and curated music selections, covering established and emerging artists and a range of jazz styles. Regular programs have included Jazztrack, presented by Mal Stanley, The Dinner Set, Jazz Legends, Essential Jazz, The Happy Hour, Jazz Unwind and The ABC Jazz Sessions.

The station also features new and archival recordings. Its Feature Album series highlights new releases, while its Classic Album series focuses on historically significant recordings. An Artist in Residence program gives Australian musicians an opportunity to curate and present their music on the network.

In 2020, ABC Jazz introduced the ABC Jazz Scholarship to support emerging musicians and expanded Jazztrack. The network also introduced its Jazz 100 countdown of Australian listeners' favourite jazz artists and welcomed broadcaster and musician James Valentine, who presented the weekly program Upbeat.

== Role in Australian jazz ==
ABC Jazz has played a role in promoting Australian jazz musicians through recordings, broadcasts, commissions, live performances and festivals. The network has also participated in projects intended to support younger and more diverse Australian jazz artists. Its establishment extended the ABC's longstanding involvement in jazz into a dedicated 24-hour digital service.

By 2018, ABC Jazz was described by the ABC as Australia's most popular digital radio station, while also attracting listeners through digital television, its online stream and the ABC Listen app.

== Availability ==
ABC Jazz is a digital-only radio service and is not broadcast on analogue AM or FM frequencies. It is available on DAB+ digital radio in Australia's digital radio markets, as well as through digital television, the ABC Listen app and online streaming.

ABC Jazz was initially associated with the expansion of DAB+ digital radio in Australia's capital cities. The ABC subsequently expanded its digital radio services to additional markets, including Canberra and Darwin in 2017. ABC Jazz is now one of the ABC's digital-only national radio services.

== See also ==
- Fine Music Sydney
