= Alan Lee (bandleader) =

Australian bandleader and musician (1936–2022)

Alan Lee (29 July 1936 – 7 August 2022) was an Australian bandleader, vibraphonist, guitarist, and percussionist. He was one of the first Australian jazz musicians to fuse classical music with jazz and to utilize Latin American rhythms in his music. He led several jazz bands in Melbourne and Sydney from late 1950s through the 1980s. His recorded albums include Gallery Concerts (1973, Cumquat Records 12–03), The Alan Lee Jazz Quartet (1973, Jazznote), Moomba Jazz ’76, Live from the Dallas Brooks Hall (1977, 44 Records 6357708), and Alan Lee and Friends: Jazz at the Hyde Park Hotel (1990, Request Records 1511) among others.

Lee died in Melbourne on 7 August 2022, at the age of 86.
