= Errol Buddle =

Australian jazz musician (1928–2018)

- Birth name: Errol Leslie Buddle
- Born: 29 April 1928
- Died: 22 February 2018 (aged 89); Potts Point, New South Wales, Australia
- Genres: Jazz
- Occupation: Musician
- Instrument(s): Saxophone, bassoon & other wind instruments

Errol Leslie Buddle (29 April 1928 – 22 February 2018) was an Australian jazz musician.

== Biography ==
Errol Buddle was born on 29 April 1928 and raised in Adelaide. He first learned the banjo and mandolin. He began learning jazz after listening to a Bobby Limb performance in 1944. Buddle attended the Elder Conservatorium of Music as well as the Sydney Conservatorium of Music. Influenced by the sound of the bassoon in Igor Stravinsky's The Rite of Spring and The Firebird, Buddle began playing the instrument. Over the course of his career, Buddle played fourteen reed instruments and several others. Buddle moved to Melbourne in 1946 and began playing the radio circuit. He relocated to Sydney by 1951 and performed weekly at the nightclub Chequers'. Buddle and Don Varella moved to Windsor, Ontario, in 1952, where Buddle joined the Windsor Symphony Orchestra.

Buddle often performed in Detroit, Michigan, where he met and collaborated with Elvin Jones and Johnnie Davis. Buddle also performed at the jazz club Klein's. The manager, George Klein, eventually asked Buddle to lead what later became the Errol Buddle Quartet. Buddle founded The Australian Jazz Quartet with Jack Brokensha, Bryce Rohde and Dick Healey. The group served as the backing band to several musicians and later played throughout North America before touring Australia in 1958, then disbanded. Buddle performed occasionally thereafter, including a fusion band he formed with Mark Isaacs playing keyboards. He died at home in Potts Point, New South Wales on 22 February 2018, aged 89.
