= Ted Nettelbeck =

Australian jazz pianist (born 1936)

- Born: Theodore John Nettelbeck; 4 January 1936 (age 90); Streaky Bay, South Australia, Australia
- Genres: jazz
- Instrument: piano

Theodore John Nettelbeck (born 4 January 1936) is an Australian psychologist and jazz pianist.

== Early life ==
Nettelbeck was born in Streaky Bay, South Australia, and began learning piano aged five. At 16, Nettelbeck attended the Adelaide Jazz Convention and began collecting jazz records. He was taught basic jazz chords on the piano by Richard Gun and invited to join Gun's jazz band, Richie Gun’s Collegians.

He began a course on architecture at the University of Adelaide, but dropped out and took a job as a clerk for Commonwealth Oil Refineries until becoming a full time musician in 1957.

== Jazz career ==
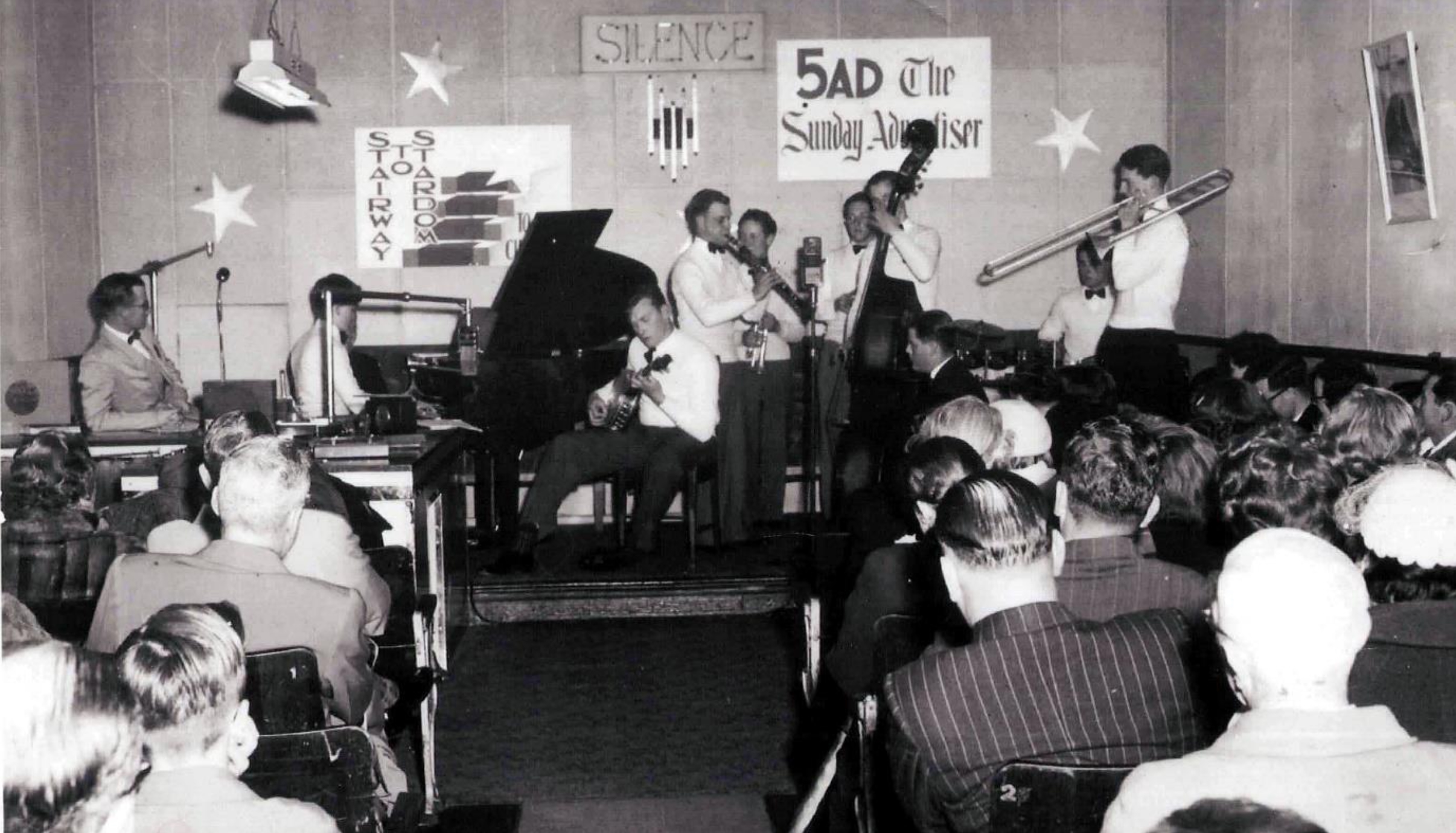
Richie Gun’s Collegians in 1954, with Ted Nettelbeck on piano.

In 1955 Nettelbeck joined Bruce Gray's All Stars, who were featured in the ABC radio series The Evolution of Jazz, in which he demonstrated his familiarity with a range of styles.

While the Oscar Peterson Trio toured Australia in 1960, Nettelbeck visited Melbourne to see the trio perform at "The Embers". There, Freddy Logan introduced Nettelbeck to the Embers' bandleader Frank Smith, who hired Nettelbeck and his friend, drummer Billy Ross. Nettelbeck took over as leader, with members Graeme Lyall (reeds), Alan Turnbull (drums), and Darcy Wright (bass).

He left Australia in 1962 for London, and toured parts of Europe with a variety of bands, returning to Adelaide in 1965. He then assembled a band of his own, and from 1970 took part in various groups, including a Billy Ross trio and Bruce Gray's Sextet.

When the "Creole Room" opened in Adelaide in 1977, Nettelbeck became a regular, backing guests and touring musicians, (Note: Visiting musicians with whom he was associated include American stars Mel Tormé, Buddy Rich, Phil Woods, Mark Murphy, and Milt Jackson.) and as a member of Schmoe & Co. But by this time he was only playing part time.

He was entered into the South Australian Music Hall of Fame, and is considered one Adelaide's most accomplished musicians.

== Academic career ==
After returning to Australia in 1965, Nettelbeck studied a Bachelor of Arts with a major in music, before changing to a PhD in psychology. In 1973 he completed his PHD An experimental investigation of some parameters affecting differences in perception. He took on a tenured position at the University of Adelaide's School of Psychology in 1974, where he remained until his retirement in 2014.

During the early 1980s, he taught jazz classes at the South Australian College of Advanced Education, and at the Elder Conservatorium of Music in 1982.

He was a member of staff at the University of Adelaide until 2017, when he moved to Melbourne. He remains a Emeritus Professor in Psychology, and is known for his work researching human intelligence and inspection time.

== Select discography ==
- The Wind, with The Errol Buddle Quartet featuring Judy Bailey (1962)
- Reflections in a Birdbath, with Ted Nettelbeck Trio (1995)
- Not Only In Stone, Ted Nettelbeck (2003)
- A Good Night, with Ted Nettelbeck & Friends (2020)
- In a State of Shock, with Ted Nettelbeck Trio (2020)
