= Stephen Magnusson =

Australian guitarist (born 1969

- Born: Stephen John Magnusson; 13 February 1969 (age 57)
- Genre: Jazz
- Occupations: Musician, composer
- Instruments: Electric guitar, acoustic guitar
- Website: www.mag.net.au/about/

Stephen John Magnusson (born 13 February 1969) is an Australian guitarist. He is known for his work as an improviser and has worked with the Australian Art Orchestra, and Elixir and Katie Noonan, Charlie Haden, Meshell Ndegeocello, Ricki Lee Jones, Sinéad O'Connor, John Cale, Gurrumul Yunupingu, Paul Grabowsky, Vince Jones, Christine Sullivan, Megan Washington, Paul Kelly, Mike Nock, Barney McAll, Enrico Rava and Arthur Blythe among others.

In 2013, Magnusson was awarded the Melbourne Prize for Music Outstanding Musician Award.

== Career ==
=== 1969-1990: Early years ===
Magnusson began playing musical instruments at age three when he was given a ukulele. At age six he had his first guitar and began performing at the age of ten on an electric guitar that he borrowed from a school teacher. He started to formally study improvisation under Gordon Pendelton at Box Hill TAFE in 1985.

In 1986, Magnusson began his formal training at the prestigious Victorian College of the Arts. Here, he worked under the supervision of musicians, Tony Gould, Bob Sedergreen and Paul Grabowsky. He practiced improvisation and composition, joining various bands and exploring many styles, developing an understanding of the mechanics of his instrument and the art of improvisation.

Magnusson was influenced as a child by the Beatles whose music Magnusson describes as "a magical experience, because it was so produced, and because of this amazing journey that they'd take you on. Especially from the mid 1960s on, they just explored sound."

Magnusson was also influenced by the linear playing of George Benson and Wes Montgomery, but also fascinated by Andy Summers of the Police who Magnusson says "..played these beautiful colours that didn't sound like pop music at the time… I just loved exploring that principle."

=== 1990-1999: Europe and Snag ===
In the mid 1990s, Magnusson travelled to Europe, performing and collaborating with musicians in Switzerland, Germany, Bulgaria and the Netherlands. In 1997 he was appointed to the staff of The Academy of Contemporary Music in Zurich and met his longtime collaborator Sergio Beresovsky. They performed regularly with Björn Meyer, a Swedish bassist and were joined soon after by Australian saxophonist Julien Wilson. They formed the group SNAG and recorded a self-titled album which was released in Australia with the title Hey Guess What. Magnusson both played and taught across Europe and performed regularly with SNAG and other ensembles.

In 1999, Magnusson was nominated for the Swiss Fellowship award.

=== 2000-2011: Solo success ===
After three years living in Zurich, Magnusson returned to Melbourne in 2000.

At the 2000 National Jazz Awards (as part of the Wangaratta Festival of Jazz), Magnusson won the National Jazz Award.

After performing with drummer Sergio Beresovsky and trumpeter Eugene Ball, the trio released the album, Healing Songs in February 2002.

In 2001, Magnusson returned to Europe, touring throughout Germany and Switzerland. In October, Magnusson brought SNAG to Australia for an East Coast tour and again appeared at the Wangaratta Jazz Festival.

In 2002, Magnusson spent time in the Northern Territory playing music in Aboriginal communities with old friend and collaborator Stephen Teakle. This had a significant impact on both his life and his music. Upon returning to Melbourne, Magnusson embarked on a recording that would incorporate these influences compositionally and sonically. Boundaries was released that year with Bassist Frank Di Sario.

In 2007, Magnusson released 14 Little Creatures on ABC Music, with The Weekend Australian giving it 4 out of 5 saying "These 14 creatures are highly individual solo guitar performances, ten of which were composed by... Stephen Magnusson. Listening to this album is like having Magnusson in your lounge room to play an intimate, unique solo concert on acoustic guitar."

Magnusson has had three compositions added to The Australian Jazz Real Book and in 2013 the Melbourne Prize Trust awarded Magnusson the Outstanding Musician Award.

=== 2012-present: Magnet and Boundaries ===
In 2012, Magnusson formed the four piece improvisational group called Magnet. Their self titled debut album was released in October 2012.

Magnusson has had three compositions added to The Australian Jazz Real Book and in 2013 the Melbourne Prize Trust awarded Magnusson the Outstanding Musician Award.

In 2013 at the Australian Jazz Bell Award, Magnusson won Best Contemporary Jazz Album with his quartet MAGNET (with Carl Pannuzzo, Eugene Ball and Sergio Beresovsky).

In May 2015, Magnusson appeared at the Melbourne International Jazz Festival with the Stephen Magnusson Quartet, Kinfolk which, along with Magnusson on guitar, included Frank DiSario on double bass, Tim Neal on Hammond organ, and Dave Beck on drums.

In November 2015, a second Magnet album was released, featuring Magnusson on guitars, Beresovsky on drum, Ball on trumpet, Carl Pannuzzo on voice and DiSario on acoustic bass guitar.

As of 2020, Magnusson is writing for his duo Boundaries (with Frank DiSario) and trio MAGnet (featuring DiSario and Dave Beck).

== Discography ==
=== Albums ===
Title	Album details
Healing Songs (with Eugene Ball and Sergio Beresovsky)	Released: February 2002; Label: Newmarket Music (NEW3132.2); Format: CD
Departures / Assumptions (with Julien Wilson and Will Guthrie)	Released: 28 February 2003; Label: Newmarket Music; Format: CD, DD; Also known as Departures by Assumptions.
Assumptions 2 (with Julien Wilson and Will Guthrie)	Released: 2003; Label: Newmarket Music (NEW3132.2); Format: CD; Recorded live at the Cape Lounge, Fitzroy on 27 July 2003
Boundaries (with Frank Di Sario)	Released: 2004; Label: Newmarket Music (NEW3141.2); Format: CD
Mag	Released: December 2005; Label: Format: CD, DD
14 Little Creatures	Released: 9 June 2007; Label: ABC Jazz (4765977); Format: CD, DD
Deflection (with Ren Wilson)	Released: 29 December 2008; Label: Vorticity Music; Format: CD, DD
Kaleidoscopic (with Julien Wilson, featuring Barney McAll, Mark Helias and Jim Black)	Released: 4 July 2009; Label: Jazzhead (HEAD113); Format: CD, DD
Inflection (with Ren Walters)	Released: 6 July 2012; Label: Ren Walters and Stephen Magnusson; Format: DD
Magnet (as Magnet)	Released: 22 October 2012; Label: ABC Jazz; Format: CD, DD, LP
Aquacheta (with Mirko Guerrini, Frank DiSario and Niko Schäuble	Released: 27 October 2013; Format: CD, DD
Paper Tiger (with Jamie Oehlers and Ben Vanderwal)	Released: 2014; Label: Assemblers Records (ASSEMBLERS001); Format: CD
The Slide Project Trio (with Sam Evans and Debasis Chakroborty	Released: 10 May 2015; Label: Sam Evans; Format: DD
SOM (as Magnet)	Released: 15 November 2015; Label: Magnet; Format: DD
Beech/Magnusson (with Jack Beeche)	Released: 11 May 2016; Label: Newmarket Music (NEW3359.2); Format: CD, DD
Endure (with Eugene Ball)	Released: 18 June 2020; Format: Streaming, DD; Recorded at Adria Studios Melbourne during lockdown

== Awards and nominations ==
=== Australian Jazz Bell Awards ===
The Australian Jazz Bell Awards, (also known as the Bell Awards or The Bells), are annual music awards for the jazz music genre in Australia. They commenced in 2003.

Year	Nominee / work	Award	Result
2008	"14 Little Creatures"	Australian Jazz Composition of the Year	Nominated
2013	Magnet by Magnet	Best Australian Contemporary Jazz Album	Won

=== Melbourne Prize Trust ===
The Melbourne Prize Trust grants awards on a rolling three-year basis for Urban Sculpture, Literature and Music and commenced in 2005.

Year	Nominee / work	Award	Result
2013	Stephen Magnusson	Outstanding Musician Award	inductee

=== National Jazz Awards ===
The National Jazz Awards are organised as part of the Wangaratta Festival of Jazz and Blues and began in 1990.

Year	Nominee / work	Award	Result
2000	Stephen Magnusson	National Jazz Award	Won

=== National Live Music Awards ===
The National Live Music Awards (NLMAs) are a broad recognition of Australia's diverse live industry, celebrating the success of the Australian live scene. The awards commenced in 2016.

Year	Nominee / work	Award	Result
National Live Music Awards of 2019	Stephen Magnusson	Live Jazz Act of the Year	Nominated
