= The Australian Jazz Quartet =

Australian Jazz Quartet
- Genres: cool jazz, mood jazz
- Instruments: piano, flute, alto sax, clarinet, bass, bassoon, tenor sax, vibraphone, percussion
- Years active: 1954–1958

The Australian Jazz Quartet (AJQ), also known as the Australian Jazz Quintet, was a jazz group active in the 1950s, best known for collaborations with Dave Brubeck, Gerry Mulligan and Carmen McRae.

== Biography ==
The group was formed in 1953 by three Australians and one American. The group was unusual in that it featured bassoon, flute, and vibraphone along with the more conventional jazz instruments, saxophone, piano, bass, and drums. Australians Errol Buddle (bassoon and tenor saxophone), Bryce Rohde (piano), and Jack Brokensha (vibraphone and percussion) arrived in Windsor, Canada during 1952–1953. These three planned to form a group and tour the US, but visa difficulties initially prevented this, so they settled down to local work in Windsor. Then, Phil MacKellar, a Jazz DJ at CBE Windsor, arranged for them to record radio programs and for Brokensha and Rohde to play at the Killarney Castle in downtown Windsor. This led to Brokensha appearing across the border in Detroit on a local WXYZ-TV show and for him to obtain employment visas enabling the three musicians to play in the US. They soon met American Richard J. “Dick” Healey (alto sax, clarinet, flute, bass, b. 1929, d. 2000, Youngstown, OH) at recording sessions in Detroit, and together the four musicians began playing as a quartet on weekly TV shows and performances at the Kleins Jazz Club.

Early 1954 appearances on the Detroit WXYZ-TV show "Soupy's On" led comedian Soupy Sales to recommend the group to a Detroit suburb club owner Ed Sarkesian to accompany jazz vocalist Chris Connor for two weeks at the club (Rouge Lounge in River Rouge, a Detroit suburb) and to have the group perform between each of her sets. Since Buddle had been playing bassoon regularly with the Windsor Symphony, Healey and Rohde quickly decided to make arrangements for the flute-bassoon-vibes combination, giving the group a distinctive sound. This unusual instrumentation created much interest in the quartet, not only from jazz enthusiasts, but also from classical music aficionados. During the two-week engagement with Connor, Sarkesian contacted Joe Glaser of Associated Booking Corporation in New York. Sarkesian named the group the Australian Jazz Quartet/Quintet, and based on a quickly recorded 78 disk, he garnered a five-year contract with ABC and Bethlehem Records for the group. Sarkesian then became the group's personal manager, which worked out very well because he also soon became a major promoter of jazz concerts and festivals.

Under the new arrangement with ABC the AJQ performed at the Blue Note in Chicago and on a concert in Washington DC. with the Dave Brubeck Quartet, the Modern Jazz Quartet, and Carmen McRae. Soon they began playing at clubs like The Hickory House, Birdland (jazz club), Basin Street, and the Roundtable in New York; the Blue Note, Modern Jazz Room, and Robert's Show Room in Chicago; Storyville in Boston; Jazz City in Los Angeles; Macumba in San Francisco; Sonny's Lounge in Denver; Peacock Alley in St. Louis; Rouge Lounge in Detroit; Peps and Blue Note in Philadelphia; Midway Lounge in Pittsburgh; Colonial in Toronto, Ball & Chain in Miami and many others. At many of these clubs the AJQ shared the band stand with well-known groups such as the Dave Brubeck Quartet, Les Brown Orchestra, Johnny Smith Quartet, Bud Shank Quartet, Miles Davis, Pete Jolly Trio, J. J. Johnson, Max Roach-Clifford Brown Quintet, Art Blakey Quintet, Teddy and Marty Napoleon Quartet, Bud Powell Trio, Thelonious Monk, Conte Candoli/Al Cohn Quintet, Ahmad Jamal Trio, Don Shirley Trio, Lee Konitz Quartet, Woody Herman, Billie Holiday and others.

In 1955 the constraint of not having a bass when Healey played reeds saw them add a dedicated bass player: firstly Jimmy Gannon, then Jack Lander, and finally Ed Gaston (b. 1929, Rodhiss, NC - d. 2012, Sydney, Aust), turning them into the Australian Jazz Quintet.

National concert tours took place in 1955–57. In 1955 there was the "Modern Jazz Show" with the Dave Brubeck Quartet, Gerry Mulligan, and Carmen McRae. In 1956 there was "Music For Moderns" with Count Basie, Erroll Garner, the Kai Winding Septet, the Chico Hamilton Quintet, and the Gerry Mulligan Quartet. In 1957, there was again "Music For Moderns" with the George Shearing Quintet, the Gerry Mulligan Quintet, Chico Hamilton, Helen Merrill, Cannonball Adderley, and Miles Davis. These tours included performances at major concert halls, including Carnegie Hall in New York.

The AJQ appeared on several national television shows, the most notable being the Steve Allen Tonight Show, The Dave Garroway Today Show, The Arthur Godfrey Show, In Town Tonight Chicago, and the Ed Mackenzie and Soupy Sales Shows from ABC in Detroit. On the Radio they were heard on CBS's "Woolworth Hour", NBC's "Monitor", and ABC's "Parade of the Bands".

During 1955 to 1958 the AJQ recorded seven albums under the Bethlehem label. The first album, distinguished by its cover illustrated by four side-by-side kangaroos, was a 10" LP recorded in February 1955 and featured arrangements of eight standard songs. A 12" version of this album, released in 1956, added three standards and one original song by bassist Jimmy Gannon, who also assisted on the recording. Meanwhile, another album, this one with scores of kangaroos on its cover, was released with 10 songs including two originals, one by Gannon and the other by Healey.

In 1958 the group traveled to Australia for The Australian Concert Tour for the Australian Broadcasting Corporation (ABC). Also, there were TV and radio broadcasts, and, in Melbourne and Sydney, there were concerts with Sammy Davis Jr. These performances were broadcast nationally by the ABC. After the 1958 tour the group members decided to terminate the AJQ and become independent performing and recording artists. However, reunion concerts occurred in Adelaide in 1986 and 1993, and a recording of the 1993 concert was distributed.

== Discography ==
=== LPs ===
- Australian Jazz Quartet (Bethlehem Records, Bethlehem BCP-1031, 1955)
- The Australian Jazz Quartet (Bethlehem BCP-6003, 1955)
- Australian Jazz Quartet/Quintet (Bethlehem BCP-6002, 1956)
- Australian Jazz Quartet/Quintet (UK London Jazz LTZ-N15065, 1957)
- The Australian Jazz Quintet: at the Varsity Drag (Bethlehem BCP-6012, 1956)
- Australian Jazz Quintet Plus One: Jazz in D Minor (Bethlehem BCP-6015, 1957)
- Rodgers & Hammerstein (Bethlehem BCP-6022, 1957)
- Free Style (Bethlehem BCP-6029, 1958)
- Three Penny Opera (Bethlehem BCP-6030, 1958)

=== CDs ===
- The Australian Jazz Quintet Plus One: Reunion (AEM Record Group, AEM 25801-2, Farmington Hills, Michigan, 1994)
- The Australian Jazz Quintet: at the Varsity Drag ( Bethlehem BCP-6012 reissued, Avenue Jazz, R2 75911, Los Angeles, 2000)
- Australian Jazz Quartet (Bethlehem BCP-6003 reissued, TOCJ-62097, Japan, 2001)
