= Bob Sedergreen =

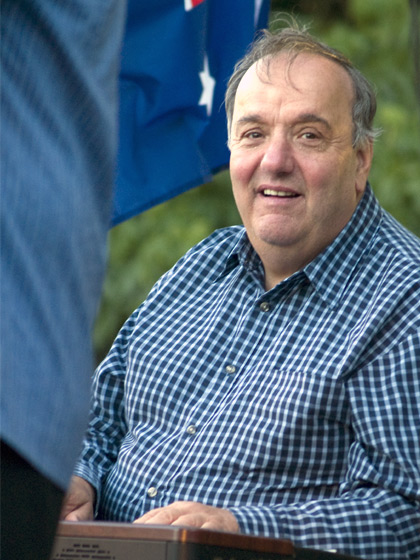
- Bob Sedergreen Melbourne, January 2007

Background information
- Born: 1943 (age 82–83); British Palestine
- Genres: Jazz, blues
- Occupations: Musician, bandleader, educator
- Instruments: Piano, keyboards
- Years active: 1962–present
- Website: Official site

Bob Sedergreen (born 1943) is an Australian jazz pianist. Sedergreen has worked with John Sangster, Don Burrows, and Brian Brown and supported Nat Adderley, Dizzy Gillespie, and Milt Jackson.

== Biography ==
Sedergreen was born in Mandatory Palestine in 1943 to Seamus "Jim" Sedergreen, a British Warrant Officer First Class, and Leah Erlichman, a milliner. In 1947, the British government sent the P&O steam ship Otranto to evacuate all British families, as the British Mandate was coming to an end and Palestine would become Israel. Bob, together with his mother, and his sisters Joyce and Millie, settled in London and his father followed in 1948. Bob moved to Australia in November 1951, where he lived in Melbourne and briefly attended Armadale State School before transferring to Haileybury College, a Presbyterian school for boys. Pianist Steve Sedergreen and saxophonist Mal Sedergreen are Bob’s sons.

Bob played with the Fred Bradshaw Quartet (1962–70), Ted Vining Trio (1971–present), Alan Lee's Plant (1973), Brian Brown's Quintet (1974) and Brian Brown's Quartet (1977–79). In the 1980s, he worked with the Australian Jazz Ensemble, Onaje and Peter Gaudion's Blues Express and the popular Blues on the Boil.

Bob has toured extensively both around Australia and overseas, including Montreal, Malaysia and Europe. He has been advisor to the Montsalvat International Jazz Festival and involved in the introduction of new talent as well as negotiating and supervising the Nat Adderley Quintet and the McCoy Tyner Trio.

As an educator, Bob has lectured at the Victorian College of the Arts and the University of Melbourne's Faculty of Music. He has also been an artist-in-residence at many Victorian secondary schools. Bob has also toured with the popular rock band Led Zeppelin playing the bagpipes.

Sedergreen began hourly sets in Melbourne, Australia, in 2007, where he has taken to narration while performing the music of his life, taking time for comments, while still playing in chronological order to entertain the public in a one-man jazz show, called, "Hear Me Talking to Ya" named after a Nat and Cannonball Adderley tune. He has worked as a band director at Blackburn High School, and also has done work at Ringwood Secondary College with his wife of 60 years Rae Sedergreen.

== Discography ==
=== Albums ===
List of albums, with selected details
Title	Details
Bobbing and Weaving	Released: 1992; Format: CD; Label: Larrikin Records (CDLRF253)
Bob Sedergreen's Deepest Green	Released: 2011; Format: CD; Label: Bob Sedergreen

== Awards ==
- 1990, Inaugural Jazz Award for Australia's Best Keyboardist.
- 2006, Kenneth Myers Medallion for contributions to the arts, the first musician to receive the award

=== Australian Jazz Bell Awards ===
The Australian Jazz Bell Awards, (also known as the Bell Awards or The Bells), are annual music awards for the jazz music genre in Australia. They commenced in 2003.

Year	Nominee / work	Award	Result
2018	Bob Sedergreen	Hall of Fame	inducted

=== Don Banks Music Award ===
The Don Banks Music Award was established in 1984 to publicly honour a senior artist of high distinction who has made an outstanding and sustained contribution to music in Australia. It was founded by the Australia Council in honour of Don Banks, Australian composer, performer and the first chair of its music board.

Year	Nominee / work	Award	Result
2008	Bob Sedergreen	Don Banks Music Award	awarded
