= National Amphitheatre, Sydney =

Venue in Sydney, New South Wales

The National Amphitheatre was a boxing stadium and entertainment venue located at 73–75 Castlereagh Street, Sydney, New South Wales. It was later rebuilt by the Fuller brothers as a theatre for vaudeville productions and underwent several refurbishments and renaming over time.

== History ==
Jim Brennan's National Sporting Club hall, located on Castlereagh Street, near King Street, was reopened on 20 November 1906 as "Brennan's National Amphitheatre" to host a fight between Mike Williams of South Africa and Billy McCall.

In 1912, Brennan and Ben and John Fuller merged their interests, and the venue became Brennan and Fuller's National Amphitheatre, specialising in lower-class vaudeville acts, competing with the more expensive offerings of Harry Rickards' Tivoli circuit. In 1915, the Fuller brothers bought out Brennan's interest.

In 1917, it was closed for renovation and reopened for Fuller as Vaudeville Theatre or National Theatre. By 1922, it had been renamed Fullers' New Theatre.

It reopened as Fuller's Roxy Theatre on 28 February 1930, then was renamed the Mayfair Theatre in March 1932, and became "Hoyts Mayfair" in 1942. The Mayfair Theatre closed in 1979, and the building was demolished in 1984.
