= Bryce Rohde =

Australian jazz pianist and composer

- Born: 12 September 1923; Hobart, Tasmania, Australia
- Origin: Adelaide, South Australia
- Died: 26 January 2016 (aged 92)
- Genres: Jazz
- Instrument: Piano
- Formerly of: The Australian Jazz Quartet

Bryce Benno Rohde (12 September 1923 – 26 January 2016) was an Australian jazz pianist and composer.

== Early life ==
Rohde was born in Hobart, Tasmania. He played jazz in Adelaide early in his career, then moved to Canada in 1953.

== Career ==
In 1954 he and two other expatriates plus an American formed the Australian Jazz Quartet/Quintet. The group recorded several albums and toured widely in the United States, then broke up in 1958 following a tour of Australia itself. Rohde led his own quartets in Australia until 1964, and moved to California in 1965. After then he based himself out of San Francisco, leading his own ensembles at times. Among those Australian musicians with whom he worked extensively are Bruce Cale and Charlie Munro.

He was strongly influenced by George Russell's musical conceptions.

== Death ==
Bryce Rohde died on 26 January 2016.

== Discography ==
- Bryce Rohde Quartet in Concert LP (CBS Coronet, December 1960)
- Straight Ahead! LP (CBS Coronet, mid 1962)
- Para Ti 7" (CBS, May 1963)
- Corners LP (CBS, June 1963)
- Big 'n Bryce LP: Clarence "Big" Miller & the Bryce Rohde Quartet (CBS, April 1964)
- Snowflakes 7" (CBS, June 1964)
- Just Bryce LP (CBS, March 1965)
- The Bryce Rohde Story – Volume 1 LP (44/Phonogram, September 1977: recorded 1960 & 1962)
- The Bryce Rohde Story – Volume 2 LP (44/Phonogram, September 1977: recorded 1963 & 1965)
- More Spring LP (MBS Jazz, 1990: recorded June 1962)
