= Cootamundra (disambiguation) =

Cootamundra is a place in New South Wales, Australia. It (or "Coota") may also refer to:

- Cootamundra Airport
- Cootamundra Annual Classic, a bicycle race
- Cootamundra Bulldogs, or just Cootamundra, a former rugby team in the Group 9 Rugby League
- Cootamundra Domestic Training Home for Aboriginal Girls, a former institution for Aboriginal girls, who were taken from their families
- Cootamundra railway station
- Cootamundra Shire, a former local government area
- Cootamundra–Gundagai Regional Council, a local government area
- Electoral district of Cootamundra, an electoral district for the New South Wales legislature
- HMAS Cootamundra, a former Australian naval vessel

== See also ==
- Cootamundra Herald, a newspaper published in Cootamundra
- Cootamundra Jazz Band, a jazz band of the 1950s
- Cootamundra wattle, a species of acacia tree
- Cootamundra West railway station
- Cootamundra World War II Fuel Depot
