= 1999 Queen's Birthday Honours (Australia) =

The 1999 Queen's Birthday Honours for Australia were announced on Monday 14 June 1999 by the office of the Governor-General.

The Birthday Honours were appointments by some of the 16 Commonwealth realms of Queen Elizabeth II to various orders and honours to reward and highlight good works by citizens of those countries. The Birthday Honours are awarded as part of the Queen's Official Birthday celebrations during the month of June.

== Order of Australia ==
=== Companion (AC) ===
==== General Division ====
Recipient	Citation	Notes
The Honourable Justice William John Ellis Cox, RFD, ED	For service to the law and the administration of justice, to legal education, to the Defence Force through the Commonwealth Defence Force Discipline Appeal Tribunal, and to the community, particularly through the Winston Churchill Trust in Tasmania.	
Edward Alfred Evans	For service to Australian economic policy development, particularly in the area of Commonwealth and State financial relations, to the establishment of a fiscal and monetary policy supportive of economic growth in climate of moderate inflation, and through the International Monetary Fund and the Organisation for Economic Cooperation and Development.	
Gary Milton Pemberton	For service to business and finance, to public sector reform, and to the community, particularly medical research organisations concerned with children's health.	

=== Officer (AO) ===
==== General Division ====
Recipient	Citation	Notes
The Honourable Albert Evan Adermann	For service to the Australian Parliament, to the community, particularly through the Church of Christ in Queensland, and to local government.	
Michael Ehrenfried Baume	For service to the arts and the development of cultural life in Australia and internationally, to the Australian Parliament and to the financial services industry.	
Digby Graham Blight	For service to public sector management in Western Australia, particularly with the Ministry of the Premier and Cabinet and the Public Sector Standards Commission, and to the community through the Diabetes Association of Western Australia.	
Professor Valerie Anne Brown	For service to science, education and the community as a leader in the field of public and environmental health education and research, and as an advocate for the promotion of sustainable development at national and international levels.	
Professor Ian William Chubb	For service to the development of higher education policy and its implementation at state, national and international levels, as an administrator in the tertiary education sector, and to research, particularly in the field of neuroscience.	
Reginald John Clairs	For service to business, particularly in the field of supermarket retailing, to the development of food product export markets, and to the community.	
Dr Thomas Blair Connor	For service to the engineering profession as an industry leader in water management and the development of flood mitigation techniques.	
Ian Colin Davidge	For service to the Australian rice industry, particularly in the area of research and development, and the establishment of export markets.	
Kevin William Duffy	For service to the international community through the child focussed aid and development agency, Plan International.	
Leonard Paul Evans, OBE	For service to the Australian wine industry, including raising the profile of Australian wines internationally, and to the community as a philanthropist, particularly through the AAP Len Evans Financial Markets Charity Event.	
Ronald Stanley Finemore	For service to the road transport industry, particularly in the areas of road safety and industry reform, to regional development and to the Wagga Wagga community.	
Frederick Rennie From	For service to the tropical and sub-tropical grains industry at local, state and national levels, in the areas of research and development, and land and water conservation.	
Robert Geoffrey Gerard	For service to the South Australian domestic and export industries, to youth, particularly through the Duke of Edinburgh's Award in Australia, and to the community as a sponsor of cultural and sporting activities.	
Professor Eric Ferguson Glasgow	For service to medicine, particularly in the field of anatomy education in Australia and internationally, to medical research into renal disease, and to the community.	
Professor Kerry John Goulston	For service to medicine in the field of gastroenterology, particularly the early detection of colo-rectal cancer, the teaching of clinical medicine and to veterans.	
John Michael Haddad, AM	For service to the tourism and hospitality through national and international organisations, the promotion of Australia as a major tourist destination, particularly from Asia and new and emerging markets, and to the community through fundraising for medical research.	
Edward James Hegerl	For service to marine conservation, particularly the protection of Queensland's coastal environment and the Great Barrier Reef, and for contributing to an increase in public awareness of the need to conserve these areas.	
Geoffrey John Henke, AM	For service to sports administration, particularly skiing, at national and international levels through the International Skiing Federation (FIS).	
Robert Campbell Hutchinson	For service to Australia's bulk commodity export/import industry and to the improvement and maintenance of appropriate environmental and safety standards for maritime, port and waterfront services.	
Dr George Kossoff	For service to science nationally and internationally, particularly as a leader in the development of ultrasonic imaging as a non-invasive diagnostic tool in medicine.	
Marlene Judith Mathews, AM	For service to athletics and sports administration, particularly through the Australian Track and Field Coaches Association, and to the community.	
John Kenneth Allister McLeod	For service to the mining industry, particularly through the Australasian Institute of Mining and Metallurgy, to education in the fields of earth sciences and the minerals industry, and to the community.	
Professor John George Morris	For service to the development of nuclear medicine through the establishment of the National Medical Cyclotron and the Nuclear Medicine Positron Emission Tomography (PET) Centre.	
Professor Marcia Ann Neave	For service to the law, particularly in relation to law reform in the area of social justice as it relates to issues affecting women, and to legal education.	
Dr Colin Edward Owen	For service to medicine in rural and remote areas through the establishment of the Rural Doctors Association in Queensland and nationally, and to the Inglewood community, particularly through the provision of community health and aged care facilities.	
Oliver Jack Richter	For service to business and industry through the development and expansion of the Commonwealth Handling and Equipment Pool (CHEP) materials handling system throughout Australia and overseas, and to the community.	
Dr Kevin Patrick Sheridan	For service to the agricultural industry as a leader in the development of policy at state, national and international levels, to overseeing the restructure of service in the agricultural sector and promoting research and education in primary production.	
Dr John Wilcox Stocker	For service to the advancement of Australian scientific and technological research and its applications for economic, social and environmental benefit.	
Harry Oscar Triguboff, AM	For service to the community as a philanthropist, and to the residential construction industry.	
The Honourable Robert Ian Viner, QC	For service to the field of Aboriginal affairs and to the Australian Parliament.	
The Honourable Justice John Spence Winneke	For service to the judiciary in Victoria, to the Defence Force and to the community, particularly sport as an advocate and arbitrator.	

=== Member (AM) ===
==== General Division ====
Recipient	Citation	Notes
The Honourable Peter Thomas Anderson	For service to the Parliament of New South Wales, to local government, and to the community through arts, health and sporting groups.	
Elizabeth Appleby	For service to women's affairs through the mothers' union in Australia, and to the community, particularly through Red Cross.	
Clifford Aubrey Baker	For service to the advancement of Australia's technological capabilities and technical standards through the National Association of Testing Authorities.	
Peter Stanley Barber	For service to town planning and the environment, particularly through the Victorian Planning and Environmental Law Association, and to professional education.	
Hilda Gracia Baylor	For service to the community, particularly through the National Council of Women, to the Parliament of Victoria and to local government.	
Emeritus Professor Margaret Joyce Bennett	For service to nursing, particularly as an educator and research, and to the establishment, maintenance and regulation of professional standards as a member of various boards and organisations, including the Nurses Board of Victoria.	
Professor Geoffrey James Bishop	For service to medicine in the field of obstetrics, gynaecology and women's health, particularly in the Asia/Oceania region.	
Percival Robert Bishop	For service to the cattle industry, conservation, and to people with disabilities.	
Dr John Michael Bourke	For service to equine veterinary science and to horseracing.	
Brian Paul Burns	For service to the administration of medical and veterinary science, to the University of Adelaide, and to the community.	
The Reverend Canon Norman Barry Butler	For service to the Aboriginal community in the Northern Territory through the Anglican Church of Australia, particularly in the design and delivery of literacy programmes, educational courses and training aimed at developing community leaders.	
Archibald Duncan Campbell	For service to the advancement of Australian foreign policy and as a contributor to the development of a nuclear non-proliferation regime through the international atomic energy agency.	
Dr Fujiko Chamberlain	In recognition of service to the promotion of bilateral relations in developing Australia-Japan friendships through various cultural and student exchange programmes Japanese language education and to the community	
Professor Judith Dorothy Chapman	For service to education in the tertiary sector as a teacher and researcher, particularly in the field of graduate studies in education and in the subject areas of educational leadership and school administration.	
Robert Denyer Cheesman	For service to architecture and the architectural profession, particularly through the Royal Australian Institute of Architects, and to the community.	
Helen Christian	For service to youth through Guides Australia at state and national levels, and to the community through social welfare and aged services organisations.	
Fiona Gay Coote	For service to the community, particularly through raising public awareness of heart disease and as a fundraiser for organisations concerned with the welfare of seriously or terminally ill children.	
Alfred Charles Copeman	For service to the mining and metals industry as a contributor to the development of industry and public policy, to education and to the community.	
Virginia Louise Cox	For service to architecture, particularly in the area of preservation, planning and contract administration.	
Diana Madeline Cullen	For service to the development of viticulture and the wine industry, particularly in the Margaret River Region of Western Australia.	
Lynette Anne Davies	For service to the Jewish community, particularly through the National Council of Jewish Women in Australia and the Wolper Jewish Hospital.	
Joan Domicelj	For service to the conservation of cross-cultural heritage as architect-planner and mediator, through national and international professional bodies such as the Australian Heritage Commission and the International Council for Monuments and Sites (ICOMOS).	
Dr William Douglas Friend	For service to community health through the Royal Flying Doctor Service, and to medicine through professional associations and medical education.	
The Reverend Dr Gordon Ross Fullerton	For service to religion and the community, particularly as the convenor of the ecumenical services committee of the ACT Churches Council, and in the development of aged care accommodation in Canberra.	
Stanley Colin Gillmore	For service to the Presbyterian Church and to the Uniting Church in Australia through the provision of leadership in the advancement of financial management and administration.	
Stanley Lloyd Gosling	For service to industry through the development of the automotive component export industry.	
The Honourable William Angus Manson Gunn	For service to the parliament of Queensland, to local government through the Laidley Shire Council, and to the community.	
Sister Patricia Hayes	For service to hospital and healthcare administration through the Rockhampton Diocese of the Sisters of Mercy Health Services Board.	
Sheila Florence Hill	For service to women, particularly through the Catholic Women's League and the World Union of Catholic Women's Organisations.	
Yvonne Lorraine Howarth	For service to the community, particularly as an advocate for the provision of better housing and health services to the Aboriginal community in Bourke, and through the Women's Advisory Council of New South Wales.	
Jack Ings	For service to youth, particularly through Life Education NSW, and to the community through Rotary International, sporting and social welfare groups.	
John Arthur Ireland	For service to the community, particularly through Aged Care Australia, and through social welfare, youth and church groups.	
Thomas Lawson Karpany	For service to the Aboriginal community, particularly in the development of programmes to combat alcohol abuse.	
Dr James Semple Kerr	For service to heritage conservation through organisations including the Australian International Council on Monuments and Sites, and the New South Wales Branch of the National Trust of Australia.	
Professor Anthony George Klein	For service to science, particularly as a researcher in the field of neutron optics, and to the community through the Royal Victorian Eye and Ear Hospital.	
His Excellency Robert Stephen Laurie	For service to the Australian diplomatic service and to the promotion of Australia's international relations.	
Neil Edward R. Lawrance	For service to conservation and the environment, particularly in the promotion of reforestation and revegetation programmes to combat soil erosion and salinity.	
Michal Arnost Lewi	For service to conservation and the environment, particularly through the National Trust of Western Australia and the Heritage Council of western Australia.	
Bryan David Lipmann	For service to the community, particularly in the provision of accommodation for older homeless people as the founder and chief executive officer of Wintringham Hostels.	
Leolo (Lee) Miralie Llewellyn	For service to the community, particularly as the co-founder and president of the Victorian Sport and Recreation Association of Persons with an Intellectual Disability Inc (VICSRAPID).	
Marjorie Joan Loone	For service to the community, particularly in the promotion and delivery of services providing for the welfare of the aged, people with disabilities and the development of youth.	
Bruce Alexander Mackenzie	For service to landscape architecture and to the environment, particularly in the use of Australian native plants in landscape design.	
John Andrew Mactaggart	For service to the beef cattle industry through industry bodies and government advisory organisations.	
Thomas Maxwell Marshall	For service to the development of the Australian automotive parts industry, particularly through the federation of automotive products manufacturers, and to the community.	
Elizabeth Mary McKay	For service to education, particularly as principal of the Canberra Church of England Girls' Grammar School.	
Terence Leonard Measham	For service to museum administration, and to the promotion of Australian innovation in science, technology and design.	
Councillor Walter Henry Mitchell	For service to local government as an advocate for social welfare, employment creation, water management and education programmes.	
John Cyril Moon, OAM	For service to the community particularly through the promotion of programmes undertaken by Rotary International and the Rotary Foundation.	
Terence Francis Moore	For service to the community of Rockhampton and to rugby union football.	
Nicholas Niarchos	For service to the Greek community of South Australia through groups providing social welfare, cultural, education and sporting programmes.	
Sister Margaret Ann Noone	For service to children with progressive life-threatening illnesses, and their families, as director of the very special kids organisation and founder of the first children's hospice in Australia.	
Joseph Alexander North	For service to local government relations, to the development and management of the road network, particularly through the Austroads council, and to the community.	
The Honourable Justice Kevin Patrick O'Connor	For service to the community and to the law, particularly as inaugural privacy commissioner, and to international relations.	
Joanne Elizabeth Paddle-Ledinek	For service to medical science through research and development into skin and tissue re-growth culture techniques, and to the community.	
Michael Fitzgerald Page	For service to the book publishing industry and to literature as a writer, and through the encouragement and support of upcoming Australian authors.	
Dr Graeme Ivan Pearman	For service to science, particularly in the field of atmospheric research, and to the community through promoting education on climate change issues.	
Elizabeth Claire Percival	For service to nursing, particularly in the areas of professional development and self-regulation, to the aged, and as a contributor to the establishment of the Australian service nurses national memorial.	
Michael Kenneth Pinnock	For service to the mining industry, particularly through the Australian Coal Association.	
Emeritus Professor the Hon. Sir Peter Platt	For service to music, particularly in the field of education, and as a scholar, performer and conductor.	
Reginald Charles Pollock	For service to public administration and school education in new south wales, particularly in the development of programmes designed to meet specific needs within the community.	
Professor Cheryl Elisabeth Praeger	For service to mathematics, particularly in the areas of research and education and through professional organisations.	
Clinical Associate Professor David Robin Richmond	For service to medicine in the field of cardiology, particularly through research and education, and the development of protocols and facilities for the treatment of life-threatening cardiac conditions.	
Professor Brian Ross Roberts	For service to natural resource management and the environment through the Australian Landcare movement and education programmes.	
Robert Braye Rogers	For service to rural health care, particularly through the Royal Flying Doctor Service, and to the community through Rotary International.	
Timothy Francis Rohl	For service to the education and management training of members of law enforcement agencies as foundation dean of the Australian Institute of Police Management.	
Brigadier Keith Vincent Rossi, OBE, RFD, ED	For service to the welfare of veterans and their families, particularly through the Victorian branch of the Returned and Services League of Australia.	
Stanley Sharkey	For service to the trade union movement, particularly through the construction, forestry, mining and energy union.	
William Elliott Small	For service to business and commerce through the accountancy profession, and to the community.	
Colin Joseph Smith	For service to the provision of improved mental health care within the community as an advocate for people with schizophrenia, their families and carers.	
Jill Mary Sommers	For service to floral art and the promotion of Australian native flora.	
Lady Marigold Merlyn Southey	For service to the community as a philanthropist, particularly in the areas of health care, medical research, the environment and the arts.	
Dr John Maxwell Sparrow	For service to public health administration in Tasmania and to medical education.	
William Francis Stephen	For service to agriculture, particularly in the area of research and development of improved pasture grass and clover species, to the Australian seed industry, and to the community of Ballarat.	
Maximillian Stern	For service to philately, particularly in the promotion of Australian stamp series overseas.	
John Nathan Stirling	For service to disadvantaged youth through the development and management of programmes and resources to assist alienated youth to rejoin the community.	
Associate Professor Anne Stonehouse	For service to children and the development of child care practices and policies, particularly through the Australian early childhood association's code of ethics and quality assurance programmes.	
Eric Storm	For service to the community through the F. P. Archer Charitable Trust.	
Robert Douglas Sturkey, CVO	For service to the office of the official secretary to the Governor-General, to the Australian Diplomatic Service, and to the Canberra community.	
Albert Charles Taylor	For service to local government through administrative and regulatory authorities in South Australia, to the Adelaide City Council and to the community.	
David Allan Whitby Thomson	For service to the health insurance industry in Australia and to rural health services through the Royal Flying Doctor Service.	
Charles Tingwell	For service to the performing arts as an actor, director and producer, and to the community.	
Diana Mary Tostevin	For service to the community, particularly through hospital and university advisory councils and boards.	
Karen June Venard	For service to the education of children with hearing impairments, particularly through the speech and hearing centre for deaf children and professional organisations.	
Dr Denis Newell Wade	For service to clinical pharmacology and to the pharmaceutical research industry.	
John William Walker	For service to public sector management and government economic reform in the Australian capital territory.	
Keith Wesley Walter	For service to the community, particularly as the founder of Interplast Australia and through Rotary International, the scouting movement, and local government.	
Chester Bryce Ward	For service to education in Tasmania as a teacher and administrator, and to the community through service, social welfare and sporting groups.	
William Theodore Wright	For service to the development of the tourism and hospitality industries, to industry training, and to the community through sporting, youth welfare and arts groups.	

==== Military Division ====
Branch	Recipient	Citation	Notes
Navy	Captain Warwick McLean Gately, RAN	For exceptional service to the Australian Defence Force in a number of key operational appointments over the past twenty-five years.	
Navy	Commander Brian Kenneth Gorringe, RAN	For exceptional service to the Royal Australian Navy and to the Australian Defence Force as the Naval Officer Commanding SA/Commanding Officer HMAS Encounter, and as the Director of Foreign Military Liaison and Visits, Defence Corporate Support.	
Navy	Commodore Geoffrey Alfred Morton, RAN	For exceptional service to the Royal Australian Navy as the Naval Attache Washington, as the Chief of Staff at Maritime Headquarters, Australia, and as the Deputy Maritime Commander.	
Army	Colonel Craig William Boyd	For exceptional service to the Australian army in the area of development of war-gaming and army logistics, particularly as the Chief of Staff, Logistics Support Force.	
Army	Lieutenant Colonel Grant Douglas Cavenagh	For exceptional service to the Australian Army in the field of logistics, particularly as the commanding officer of 2nd Field Logistics Battalion and 10 Force Support Battalion.	
Army	Major Johannes Cornelis Fleer, DCM	In recognition of service to the Australian Army in the selection and training of soldiers for the army's special forces	
Army	Colonel William Stephen Nagy	For exceptional service to the Australian Defence Force in the Mission Planning Service, United Nations Headquarters, New York, and as the Director Land Support Development in Capability Development Division, Australian Defence Headquarters.	
Army	Brigadier Bruce Victor Osborn, CSC	For exceptional service to the Australian Defence Force in staff, representational and command appointments; in particular, as the commander of the Peace Monitoring Group on Bougainville.	
Army	Colonel Roger Alfred Tiller, ADC	For exceptional service to the Australian Army as the commanding officer of the 3rd Battalion, the Royal Australian Regiment, and as the Chief of Staff, Headquarters 2nd Division.	
Air Force	Warrant Officer Keith Ian Bagley	For exceptional service to the Royal Australian Air Force in the field of logistics support.	
Air Force	Wing Commander Sheldon Dwight Kimber	For exceptional service to the Australian defence force and the royal Australian air force as a staff officer in force development (land), and as the commanding officer of the royal Australian air force security and fire school.	
Air Force	Air Vice-Marshall Graeme David Moller	For exceptional service to the defence health service, particularly as the surgeon general of the Australian Defence Force.	
Air Force	Group Captain John Gordon Monaghan	For exceptional service to the Australian Defence Force in the fields of aeronautical engineering and airworthiness management in support of military aviation.	
Air Force	Group Captain David Alexander Pietsch	For exceptional service to the Royal Australian Air Force in the development of aviation capabilities.	

=== Medal (OAM) ===
==== General Division ====
Recipient	Citation	Notes
Robert James Abernethy	In recognition of service to the community, particularly through the St John Ambulance and the Binalong Rescue Service	
Victor Donald Alberts	For service to the community through Rotary International, Camp Quality and the Australia-Papua New Guinea Friendship Association.	
James Percival Allan	For service to the community, particularly through the Mount Barker Division of the St John Ambulance.	
John Kenneth Alvey	For service to the promotion and development of recreational fishing.	
Eulyce Arkleysmith	For service to the rural community, particularly in the field of speech pathology, and through the Riding for the Disabled Association (NSW).	
Iris Ayrton	For service to youth, particularly through the Scout Association of New South Wales and Guides Australia.	
Malcolm Alsager Ayrton	For service to youth, particularly through the Scout Association of New South Wales and Guides Australia.	
Jim Barr	For service to golf administration at state and national levels.	
Margaret Mary Barry	For service as an advocate and supporter of community groups in the south Sydney area, particularly through the Inner Sydney Regional Council for Social Development.	
Robert Thomas Beakley	For service to youth and sport in Tasmania, particularly through Australian rules football and cricket, and to the Anglican Church.	
Arnold Vincent Beecher	For service to the community of Camden Haven, particularly through Meals on Wheels and Rotary International.	
Elizabeth Galloway Bell	For service to Buddhism in Australia.	
Dr Rodney Lloyd Benjamin	For service to the Jewish community in Victoria and to the insurance industry.	
Charles Bopf	For service to the community, particularly through Rotary International and the Townsville branch of the Queensland Retired Police Association.	
Cecil Angus (Mick) Boston	For service to local government and to the community of Jamestown.	
Elizabeth May Bramble	For service to education in the Hunter Region and to the community.	
Robin John Brampton	For service to the community, particularly through the Queen Street and West Woollahra Association.	
Kenneth William (Dookie) Brock	For service to the community as a musician and entertainer with the Brock Brothers Band.	
Sergeant Gary Ian Brodie	For service to the community as a member of the Australian Federal Police.	
Malcolm David Broun, QC	For service to the Scottish community in Australia through the Scottish Australian Heritage Council.	
Patricia Mary Brown	For service to the community, particularly through the Tea Gardens/Hawks Nest Senior Day Care, Meals on Wheels and Red Cross.	
Robert Allen Bruce	For service to conservation through the Pambula Area Planning and Progress Association and to the community.	
Eva May Brunner	For service to the community, particularly through the Friends of the Royal Botanic Gardens (Melbourne), and to the Australian committee of the Vellore Christian Medical Hospital, India.	
Major Marjorie Muriel Bruton	For service to the community, particularly through the Salvation Army.	
John Stuart Buchanan	For service to primary industry and to the rural community, particularly through the Gunnedah and District Historical Society.	
Joan Bull	For service to the community particularly through the Bingara District Historical Society.	
Isabel May Burnell	For service to youth through Guides Australia as a leader and trainer.	
Mora Jane Bush	For service to equestrian sports as a rider, instructor, judge and administrator.	
Dawn Lillian Case	For service to the community, particularly through Camp Quality, Hawkesbury District Agricultural Association and the Australiana Pioneer Village.	
John Brian Case	For service to veterans and their families, particularly through the Clarence sub-branch of the Returned and Services League of Australia.	
James Robert Cattle	For service to local government and to the community of Netherton.	
Margaret Joyce Cheal	For service to charitable organisations, particularly through the United Hospital Auxiliaries of New South Wales and the Governor Phillip Special Hospital.	
Frank Chou	For service to the Chinese community in the Cabramatta/Fairfield district, particularly in the areas of social welfare and migrant assistance.	
Evangelos Demetriou Christou	For service to the Greek community in South Australia.	
Dianne Clancy	For service to the community, particularly to the aged in the Tamborine Mountain area.	
Frederick Laycock Clark	For service to the community, particularly through the Armidale and New England District Hospital, and to animal welfare organisations.	
Peter Patrick Clifford	For service to conservation and the environment in the Gosford and North Entrance areas, and to the community.	
Margaret Joan Coghlan	For service to the community, particularly through the Catholic Women's League.	
Valda Edith Cole	For service to the community through research into, and promotion of, the history of the Western Port area.	
Brian James Collings, RFD, ED	For service to community history through the collection and preservation of materials for the Royal Australian Engineers Museum.	
June Ann Comins	For service to the community of Yass through charitable organisations including Red Cross, the Spastic Centre, the National Trust and the Show Society.	
Pamela Christina Mildred Condie	For service to youth in Queensland through the Girls' Brigade and the Duke of Edinburgh's Award in Australia.	
John (Jack) Conway	For service to children with disabilities, particularly through the Intellectually Handicapped Children's Centre of New South Wales.	
Barrie Robert Cooper	For service to overseas humanitarian aid, particularly through the Rotary Overseas Medical Aid for Children Project.	
Dr Kevin Dominic Coorey	For service to the community, particularly in the area of promoting rehabilitation medicine and services for the elderly.	
Lionel Malvyne Cox	For service to cycling, particularly as a coach and former competitor.	
William Thomas Craggs	For service to apprenticeship training in the manufacturing industry sector.	
Kevin Douglas Crameri	For service to local government and to the community of Penrith.	
Ronald John Crawford	For service to athletics as a competitor and administrator.	
Edith Joyce Croker	For service to the community through the Friends of the Queen Elizabeth Hospital, the Dante Alighieri Society and the Charles Sturt Memorial Museum Trust Inc.	
Claude Colquhoun Crowe	For service to the nursery industry, particularly in the Southern Highlands district, and to youth through the scouting movement.	
Eugene Francis Cusack	For service to the Bendigo community, particularly through the research and recording of its history.	
Barbara Ruth Daly	For service to the community, particularly through the Coledale Community Centre.	
Sheila Josephine Davison	For service to veterans, particularly through the Ex-Prisoners of War Association, the Women's Royal Australian Army Corps Association and the Lady Davidson Hospital.	
Bernard John Dawson	For service to the community, particularly through the Mater Hospitals' Trust.	
Phyllis Mary Elizabeth Daymon	For service to the community, particularly through the Red Cross, and to veterans.	
Stephen Charles Dearnley	For service to sailing, particularly through the introduction of Heron & National E class sailing dinghies to Australia, and as founder of the Ulysses Club and its support for the Arthritis Foundation of NSW.	
Helene Gertrude Dennis	For service to the community, particularly through the Laurina Lodge Hostel for the Frail Aged, and to the Gippsland branch of the National Council for Women.	
Edward John Dickinson	For service to the community, and to clay target shooting in Western Australia.	
David Griffiths Dicks	For service to sailing.	
Phillippa Mary Dimakis	For service to education, particularly through the NSW Adult Migrant Education Service.	
Elspeth Mary Doman	For service to the Art Gallery of South Australia Foundation, particularly through the organisation of fundraising events, and to the St John Ambulance.	
Alice Doumani	For service to the Lebanese community and to fundraising, particularly through the St George Ladies Auxiliary and the Australian Lebanese Ladies Fund.	
Peter Doyle	For service to the community of Newcastle.	
Edna Jean Duncanson	For service to local government through the Bega Valley Shire Council, and to the community.	
Clare Mary Elizabeth Dunne	For service to multiculturalism, particularly through the promotion of Celtic culture, and to ethnic broadcasting.	
Percival Vincent Dunning, BEM	In recognition of service to local community organisations, particularly sporting groups and as a fundraiser.	
Athol Lawrence Eiszele, ISO	For service to the community and to veterans and their families.	
George Maxwell Ellis	For service to the community of Tamworth and to rural Australia through the promotion and development of the Country Music Awards of Australia and the Ag-Quip field days.	
Margaret Nicole Evered	For service to the community, particularly youth, through the scouting movement.	
Graham John Montague Farley, RFD, ED	For service to the community through the scouting movement, the Army Reserve, and the Anglican Church, and as foundation headmaster of Braemar College.	
Margaret Rose Fielding	For service to veterans through the Australian Women's Army Service Association of Queensland.	
William Lawrence Firth	For service to the community, particularly through the St John Ambulance in the Hunter Region of New South Wales.	
Allan Bruce Fisk MBE	For service to the community through the Children's Cancer Institute of Australia and youth sailing programmes.	
Angelina Fitzgerald	For service to the community, particularly as a member of the Fremantle Hospital Ladies Auxiliary.	
The Reverend Father Thomas Patrick Fitzgerald	For service to the Catholic Church and to religious education.	
William Terence Fitzgerald	For service to diving, and to the development and training in the use of life support breathing apparatus.	
Ian Arch Fletcher	For service to medicine, particularly as a surgeon in the Port Lincoln and Eyre Peninsula area of South Australia.	
Cedric Arthur Flower	For service to Australian history, particularly the identification, classification and preservation of historic buildings through the New South Wales branch of the National Trust of Australia.	
Elaine Patricia Fraser	For service to dance particularly as a teacher and choreographer.	
Laurence Percy Fricker	For service to the elderly, particularly the pastoral care and support of veterans at the Myrtle Bank War Veterans Home.	
Charlotte Alma Gallagher	For service to the arts in regional areas, particularly in administration and promotion, and to the community.	
Pauline June Gallagher	For social and community service, particularly through the Riverwood Community Centre.	
Jean Audrey Garrick	For service to youth through the Queensland branch of Guides Australia, and to the community.	
Hector Beaumont Gilliland	For service to the visual arts, particularly in the medium of watercolour, as a painter and a teacher.	
Alexander George Goodsell	For service to preserving and promoting the local history of Campbelltown.	
Dorothy Margaret Gore	For service to the community of Willoughby, particularly through netball and the Anglican Church.	
Louise Mary Gourlay	For service to the community, particularly through the Royal Children's Hospital Auxiliaries.	
Francis Richard Gwynne, MBE	For service to the welfare of veterans and their families, particularly through the Dalby sub-branch of the Returned and Services League of Australia.	
Rosemary Dawn Hall	For service to the community, particularly through musical entertainment and associated fundraising activities for charities and service organisations.	
Leith Ranclaud Halliday	For service to the community of Unley through service groups, sporting clubs and the Anglican Church.	
John Crawford Hannan	For service to the New South Wales coal industry, particularly in the promotion of land rehabilitation measures and environmental management standards.	
Janice Merle Hannant	For service to secondary education in Queensland, particularly in the field of home economics.	
David Clement Darold Harper	For service to the legal profession through the Law Society of the Australian Capital Territory.	
Marion Evelyn Harriden	For service to the community of Dingley Village, particularly through social, cultural and welfare organisations.	
Michele Ann Harris	For service to the refugee community, particularly through counselling and advocacy services for those who have suffered torture and trauma.	
James Christopher Harrison	For service to the community, particularly through the plasmapheresis blood donor scheme.	
Francis Hawdon, ED	For service to veterans and their families, particularly through the 35th Australian Infantry Battalion Association.	
Lloyd Frederick Hawkins	For service to the financial services industry, particularly through the Queensland Teacher's Credit Union Limited, and to the community.	
John Neville Hayes	For service to the community of Newcastle, particularly through the Lions Club and the Anglican Church.	
John Raymond Hazell	For service to the community, particularly through the St Vincent de Paul Society.	
Lieutenant Colonel Michael George Heal (Ret'd)	For service to visually impaired people, particularly through the Canberra Blind Society.	
Gwynneth Valerie Heinrich	For service to the community, particularly through welfare, charitable and service organisations.	
Irena Higgins	For service to the community as an advocate and pioneer in the development of social welfare programmes in the Melbourne area.	
Esme Bertha Hilton	For service to veterans, particularly through the Bankstown RSL Women's Auxiliary.	
Dulcie Ruth Hipwell	For service to the community, particularly through Newcastle and District Meals on Wheels.	
Noelene Joyce Hitchcock	For service to the community of the Hawkesbury district and as a fundraiser for the Children's Medical Research Foundation.	
Bruce Cecil Hodges	For service to the community of the Snowy River region through emergency service and community welfare organisations.	
Ernest Sydney Hoskin	For service to ornithology, particularly in the Sydney region.	
John Kevin Howard	For service to the community of Wangaratta, particularly through local government and community support organisations.	
William Edward Hubble	For service to the community, particularly to people with disabilities, the migrant community and the aged.	
Patricia Evelyn Huggins	For service to the community, particularly through fundraising for the Moorabbin Hospital and the Monash Medical Centre Auxiliaries.	
Raymond John Hughes	For service to veterans and war widows through the welfare programme of the Logan and District sub-branch of the Returned and Services League of Australia.	
Edward James Hunt	For service to veterans and their families through ex-service organisations, and to the community.	
Brian Morgan Hurn	For service to local government through the Barossa Council, and to the community of Angaston.	
Hoc Ku Huynh	For service to the community, particularly through the Australian Chinese and Descendants Mutual Association.	
Henry William Keith Irwin	For service to the community of Nowra, particularly the aged and veterans.	
John Jacmon	For service to the Greek community in the Australian Capital Territory, particularly through social and cultural organisations assisting veterans and the aged.	
Barry John James	For service to the insurance industry, particularly in the area of professional education.	
Walter Wilson Jervis	For service to the community of the Illawarra region of New South Wales.	
Jack Mayer Joel	For service to the community through support for organisations providing health, welfare and educational services.	
Douglas Johnsson	For service to the community of Kangaroo Island, particularly through the development of the tourist industry.	
Roslyn Eva Johnsson	For service to the community of Kangaroo Island, particularly through the arts and in promoting the work of local artists.	
Leslie Robert Jones	For service to youth through the scouting movement, and to the community.	
Murray Alan Jorgensen	For service to local government, particularly the City of Albany.	
Robyn Ellen Kapp	For service to people with disabilities and their families, particularly through Huntington's Disease organisations and the Spastic Centre of New South Wales.	
Captain Edward Trenchard Keane RAN (Ret'd)	For service to veterans and their families, particularly in the development of outreach facilities and aged care services in Queensland.	
Jennifer Anne Kearney	For service to youth through the OpenDoors counselling and educational services, and to lifestyle education.	
Dr Ruth Sadie Kerr	For service to the preservation of Australian history, particularly through the Royal Historical Society of Queensland, and to the community.	
Bert Christian King	For service to surf lifesaving, particularly in the area of training in the use of rescue craft.	
Harold Abraham Krantz	For service to architecture, particularly professional development, and to the performing arts in Perth.	
Colin Douglas Kuchel	For service to the sport of full-bore rifle shooting at state and national levels.	
David Harry Lance	For service to education, particularly through the University of Technology Sydney, and as an advocate of the application of scientific and technological research in commercial development projects.	
Diana Mary Landsberg	For service to youth, particularly through the Duke of Edinburgh's Award in Australia.	
Clarence Moren Langham	For service to youth through the scouting movement, and to the community, particularly through Concord Food Services.	
Neale John Lavis	For service to equestrian sports as a competitor, coach and administrator, and to the community.	
Mervyn Reginald Lee-Archer	For service to amateur athletics at club and state levels.	
Norman Henry Leeson	For service to power boat racing and to the community, particularly through the Brisbane Eisteddfod and the scouting movement.	
Janet Grace Leggo	For service to music education, particularly as a pioneer in the use of the Suzuki method of piano teaching.	
Janet Ann Leitch	For service to the community of the Adelaide Hills, particularly through participation in musical events and through the scouting movement.	
Cheong Yew Liew	For service to the food and restaurant industry through involvement in developing and influencing the style of contemporary Australian cuisine.	
Eric Alleyne Loder	For service to the community of Murwillumbah, particularly as a fundraiser for charities.	
Muriel Burnham Loder	For service to the community of Murwillumbah, particularly through the Murwillumbah Hospital Auxiliary and the Murwillumbah RSL Sub-branch Women's Auxiliary.	
Fay Estelle Logan	For service to the community through local government and as a fundraiser for health and social welfare groups.	
Julie Heather Long	For service to youth in the Australian Capital Territory, particularly through the Children's Book Council of Australia and the scouting movement.	
William Allan George Lugg	For service to the community of Coburg, particularly through local government, sporting and service groups.	
Maxwell Bertram Lugsdin	For service to the community of the Hay district, particularly through water and irrigation management, and to local government.	
The Honourable Roderick Alexander Mackenzie	For service to the community of Geelong and to the Australian National Antarctic Research Expedition Club.	
Dr Donald Newell Mackie	For service to veterinary science and to the community, particularly through organisations including the RSPCA, the Australian Expert Service Overseas Programme, and the Anti-Cancer Foundation.	
Graham Edwin Maynard	For service to the provision of accommodation for the aged, particularly through Bethany Christian Care.	
Beatrice Jane McCallum	For service as an English teacher, and in the areas of speech and drama.	
Hugh Fletcher McEwen	For service to athletics as a coach and technical adviser in the Oceania region.	
Dr Angus John McIntosh	For service to medicine, particularly in the field of paediatrics, and as chairman of the Medical Board in the Australian Capital Territory.	
Graham Duncan McKenzie	For service to the community through surf lifesaving, particularly in the field of safety education.	
Ian Bruce McMaster	For service to primary industry, particularly through the united grazier's association of Queensland, the Queensland Rural Industry Training Committee, and to the community.	
Margaret Lois Medcalf	For service to the preservation of history through support for the Royal Western Australian Historical Society and the Western Australian Maritime Museum.	
Father Bernard Matthew Melville	For service to the community of Manilla, particularly through health, social welfare and youth organisations.	
Carole Helen Miller	For service to Australian radio broadcasting, particularly in the Northern Territory through Top FM, the Territory Network, NT Community Radio Association, Multilingual Broadcasting Council NT and Radio Larrakia, and to the broader community of the Northern Territory.	
David Miller	For service to the community of the lower North Shore of Sydney, particularly the Celtic and British communities.	
Grahame Edmund Milliner	For service to youth through the Boys' Brigade Australia.	
Annemarie Misamer	For service to nursing, particularly in the field of neuro-psychiatric nursing, and to the community.	
Dorothy Patricia Misto	For service to the community, particularly the aged through the provision of entertainment to residents of nursing homes.	
Joan Christine Mitchell	For service to the preservation of the history of Echuca, particularly through the Echuca Historical Society.	
Neil Montgomery	For service to the community through surf lifesaving at club and national levels.	
Brian William Moore	For service to children with disabilities at the regency park school, and to the community through Meals on Wheels and Trees for Life.	
Arthur James Moorshead	For service to judo as an administrator, coach and examiner.	
Ellen Jean Morton	For service to the community of the Gold Coast, particularly through charitable and service groups.	
The Reverend Canon Leonard Hilton Nairn	For service to the Anglican Church, particularly in the field of education.	
Winifred Mary Neely	For service to the community of Maitland, particularly through the Business and Professional Women's Club.	
Colin Mark Nixon	For service to the community of Springsure and District.	
Jack McKay Nobbs	For service to hockey in South Australia as a player, coach, manager and administrator.	
Dr Edgar John Hamilton North	For service to medicine as a general practitioner, to the Royal Australian College of General Practitioners and to the Victorian Medical Postgraduate Foundation.	
Dr John Bernard Nunn	For service to the community of the Wimmera region, and to the youth of Horsham, particularly in the area of public speaking.	
Reginald Charles O'Brien	For service to the welfare of veterans, particularly as the pensions/welfare officer of the Tweed Heads/Coolangatta sub-branch of the Returned and Services League of Australia.	
Patricia Ann O'Bryan	For service to music and the arts, and to the community of Launceston.	
Michael Barrie Oldfield	For service to conservation and the environment, particularly through the Western Australian branch of Men of the Trees.	
Richard Frank Oldmeadow	For service to the community through the Uniting Church and its support programmes for the aged, migrant groups and the homeless.	
Herbert Neil Oliver	For service to veterans, particularly through the Tasmanian branch of the Returned and Services league of Australia, and to the community.	
Ian Ronald Oliver	For service to regional and economic development in the Riverland area, and to the community of Waikerie.	
Associate Professor John Herbert Overton	For service to medicine and to the welfare of children as a paediatric anaesthetist.	
The Honourable George Paciullo	For service to the Parliament of New South Wales, to local government, to sport and to the community.	
Arthur Bray Parkyn	For service to surf lifesaving in Queensland, particularly on the Sunshine Coast, and to the community.	
Frank Arthur Parsons	For service to ice skating, particularly Australian figure skating as a judge, coach and referee.	
Kenneth Dean Patterson	For service to conservation and the environment, particularly the propagation, planting and maintenance of trees in the Munno Para District.	
The Reverend Norman Charles Pearce	For service to the Uniting Church in Australia, and to the aged residents of the Salford Park Community Village.	
Geoffrey William Pedler	For service to youth, particularly through the Naval Reserve Cadets.	
Kevin Albert Pfeiffer	For service to the wine industry in the Riverland area, and to the community.	
Jill Ann Polkinghorne	For service to the community, particularly through the Lismore branch of the Arthritis Foundation of New South Wales, and through primary industry, school and church groups.	
Ian Slade Porter	For service to local government, particularly as the general manager of the City of Campbelltown.	
Margaret Parkes Poulton	For service to the community in the area of health and welfare services through the Menzies Homes for Children, the Peninsula Hospice Service and the Frankston Cancer Support Group.	
Harold Frank Priestley	For service to veterans, particularly through the Ulverstone and Penguin sub-branches of the Returned and Services League of Australia, and to the community.	
Philip Andrew Pringle	For service to the community as the founder and leader of the Christian City Church in the Northern Beaches area of Sydney, and through youth outreach programmes.	
Anne Newall Purves	For service to the arts and to the promotion of Australian artists through galleries and arts organisations.	
Sister Shirley Mabel Raffen	For service to nursing and to the community, particularly through the Mary Potter Hospice.	
Brian Miller West Randall, RFD	For service to youth through the Air Training Corps.	
Stephen Alfred Randell	For service to people with disabilities, particularly through the St Mary's Arts and Crafts Association, and to the community.	
Albert Francis Ransley	For service to the preservation of vintage and veteran cars, to local government, to power boat racing as a competitor and administrator, and to the community.	
Heather Isabelle Read	For service to lawn bowls, particularly through the Murray Valley District Ladies Bowling Association.	
Noel William Reardon	For service to the community, particularly through the Condoblin Pony Club, show societies in Central Western New South Wales and the Milby Bush Fire Brigade.	
William Edwin Reed	For service to the community, particularly in the Shoalhaven area, through the provision of prosthetic and orthotic services.	
Malcolm Bruce Reid	For service to youth, particularly through the naval reserve cadets, and to the community.	
Elaine Lily Rich	For service to people with HIV/AIDS through the Des Kilkeary Lodge, and to the families of veterans.	
Margaret Anne Rich	For service to the visual arts in regional Victoria, particularly through the Ballarat Fine Arts Gallery.	
Barton Dalyell Richardson	For service to lawn bowls through the Newcastle District Bowling Association, and to the community through service groups and as a fundraiser for welfare organisations and for projects at the University of Newcastle.	
Elizabeth Nora Richardson	For service to the profession of dietetics, and to the promotion of nutrition education in the community.	
Susan Ride	For service to the community, particularly to youth through the Alice Springs Youth Centre.	
Bruce Duncan Rigby	For service to the grazing industry in Queensland, particularly through the Warrego division of the United Graziers' Association, and to the community.	
Clive Walter Robartson	For service to local government, particularly through the City of Melville, and to the community through social welfare programmes and the Churches of Christ in Western Australia.	
Allan Gordon Robertson, OBE	For service to the community, particularly through the Patriotic Funds Council of Victoria	
Shirley Dorothy Robinson	For service to youth, particularly through the scouting movement in the Albany district.	
Gladys E. M. Rogers	For service to the community of Gilgandra, particularly through the Country Women's Association of New South Wales and Red Cross.	
William Albert Rohan	For service to the community, particularly through the Society of St Vincent de Paul.	
Avon Harold Rosenzweig	For service to local government through the Mannum District Council, and to the community.	
Bernard Ross	For service to the community as a foster parent.	
Marie Therese Ross	For service to the community as a foster parent.	
Joan Lucy Nell Rutley	For service to the performing arts and museums through documentation, conservation and exhibition of the Performing Arts Museum costume collection.	
Patrick Francis Noone Ryan	For service to music, speech and drama through the Australian College of Music.	
Adele Henderson Saunders	For service to netball as a player, administrator and umpire, and to the community of Newcastle.	
Dr Teong Soo Saw	For service to the community, particularly through the Chinese Association of Victoria.	
John Stanley Schultz	For service to the community through the establishment and development of CareSource.	
Harry Sebel	For service to promotion of excellence in design, particularly in the furniture industry, and to the community through charitable organisations.	
Barry Kenneth Shepherd	For service to cricket as a player and administrator.	
Cecil Robert Shepherd	For service to local government, and to the community of Crookwell.	
Sydney James Slingsby	For service to the community through the No 2 Australian Corps Signals Association.	
Patrick Roy Slocomb	For service to the community, particularly through the Bundaberg branch of the St John Ambulance, to veterans and to local government.	
Coralie Jocelyn Soward	For service to the community of Burnside through social welfare and health organisations, and to local government.	
John Aloysius Speight	For service to music, particularly through the organisation and promotion of jazz festivals, and as a band leader.	
Ann Dolores Spillane	For service to the community of Lismore, particularly through the friends of St Vincent's Hospital.	
Associate Professor Brian Richard Spurrett	For service to medicine and international relations, particularly through promoting maternal and child health in Oceania and Asia.	
Raymond Thomas Stack	For service to the community of Taree, particularly through support for charitable and sporting organisations.	
Thomas Carr Stanbridge	For service to veterans, particularly through the Totally and Permanently Incapacitated Veteran's Association of New South Wales Limited.	
Dr Heinrich Stefanik	For service to multiculturalism, to ethnic broadcasting and to the community.	
Dr Edward Anthony Stephens	For service to youth, particularly through the Peer Support Foundation in Victoria.	
Shirley Mary Stevenson	For service to the community, particularly through the Travellers' Cot Fund.	
Geoffrey Macquarie Stooke	For service to rugby union football in Western Australia as an administrator, coach and player.	
Gillian Eleanor Stowell	For service to music, particularly through Musica Viva, and to the visual arts in Newcastle.	
Robert Keith Strathdee	For service to the aged, particularly through the Pioneer Memorial Home for the Aged, and to the sugar cane industry.	
Roger Bruce Summerill	For service to tourism, particularly in the Shoalhaven and South Coast regions of New South Wales.	
Rex Keith Swann	For service to Australian rules football, particularly as an administrator.	
James Robinson Switzer	For service to surf lifesaving, and to the community.	
Alice Mary Tagg	For service to the community, particularly through charitable organisations and the Hobart Horticultural Society.	
Joyce Tagg	For service to the community, particularly through charitable organisations and the Hobart Horticultural Society.	
Eileen May Taunton	For service to the community, particularly through the Abbotsford Branch of Red Cross.	
Evelyn Jean Thompson	For service to the community, particularly through the Twilight Committee at Sutherland Hospital and Day Care Centres.	
James Edward Thompson	For service to school and youth cricket organisations, particularly as an administrator.	
Norah Eleanor Thomson	For service to the community, particularly through the Young Women's Christian Association.	
Thomas Peter Thorn	For service to conservation and the environment, particularly through The Tree Society of Western Australia.	
George William Thorpe	For service to veterans and their families, particularly through the Maleny sub-branch of the Returned and Services League of Australia, and to conservation through the Society for Growing Australian Plants.	
John David Tipping	For service to the communities in the La Trobe Shire, particularly the aged, and to charitable and welfare organisations.	
Peter Damien Tobin	For service to history, particularly through the Ballarat Historical Park Association (Sovereign Hill) and the Eureka Commemorative Society, and to tourism.	
George Todeschini	For service to youth in the Bendigo region, particularly through Scouts Australia and Junior Moto Cross.	
Albert Chih Keung Tuan-Mu	For service to the community, particularly through the Chinese Community Resource Centre and the Australian Chinese Achievers Award.	
Peter Leslie Tuck	For service to people with disabilities, particularly through the Wanneroo Challenge Brass Band.	
Eric Barrie Valentine	For service to the community in the field of surveying and land use planning, through the Aero Club of Southern Tasmania, and to motor sports.	
Donald Frederick Verlander	For service to vision impaired people and to the community through the Pets as Therapy programme.	
Stella Mary Vernon	For service to the community, particularly through the Campbelltown and Airds Historical Society.	
Tamara Vingilis	For service to the Lithuanian community, particularly the aged, and to women.	
Michael Howard Wadley	For service to the community, particularly through the Rockingham-Kwinana unit of the State Emergency Service.	
Henry (Harry) Wakeham	For service to veterans through the HMAS Canberra/HMAS Shropshire Associations, and to the community through the Lions Clubs International and the Royal Blind Society of New South Wales.	
Doris Joan Walker	For service to the community, particularly through the Crows Nest and District Historical Society.	
Kathleen Ionie Walker (Dr Farr)	For service to veterinary science, particularly through the Australian Veterinary Association.	
Carmel Walshe	For service to the community through music.	
Lilah Alice Walton	For service to community health, particularly through the Laryngectomee Association of New South Wales.	
David Jock Ward	For service to the wool industry, particularly through wool testing development in Australia and internationally.	
Dr Guy Wilkie Warren	For service to art, particularly as a painter, lecturer and journalist.	
Rudolph Carl Wassman	For service to the pineapple industry in Queensland through pest and disease control and improved production methods.	
James Waters	For service to the community, particularly in the field of intercultural understanding, through the development of innovative education and multicultural programmes.	
Max Waters	For service to surf lifesaving, particularly as an administrator, educator and judge.	
Gordon Milne Wicks	For service to lawn bowls through the Royal New South Wales Bowling Association, and to veterans through the Catalina Association of New South Wales.	
Stanley Thomas Wilcox	For service to surf lifesaving, particularly as an administrator and competitor.	
Margaret Gertrude Williams	For service to the Australian Women's Land Army United Association, and to the community.	
Trevor Reginald Williams	For service to veterans and their families, particularly through Legacy and the Returned and Services League of Australia.	
Vivian Charles Williams	For service to youth, particularly through the Naval Reserve Cadets.	
Hilda Joan Wills	For service to youth, particularly through Lord Somers Camp and Power House, to family history through the Genealogical Society of Victoria, and to the Ex-Royal Australian Air Force Nursing Association.	
Beranece Catherine Wilson	For service to the community, particularly through the Citizens Advice Bureau in Ipswich and the Queensland branch of Relationships Australia.	
John Ernest Woodford	For service to young people with disabilities as principal of Holroyd School for specific purposes and through the organisation TRAILS Inc.	
Ernest Edward Yallop	For service in the field of social welfare through the Uniting Church of Australia and community organisations.	
Thomas Ronald Percival Yeo	For service to the welfare of veterans and their families through ex-service organisations in the Newcastle region.	
Yvonne Yook	For service to the community, particularly through charitable organisations as a donor and fundraiser.	
Robert George Young	For service to the community through Rotary International programmes.	

==== Military Division ====
Branch	Recipient	Citation	Notes
Navy	Chief Petty Officer Shane Michael Biddle	For meritorious service to the Royal Australian Navy as a marine technician.	
Navy	Commander Robert Clive Brown RAN	For meritorious service to the Australian Defence Force as the director logistics information management, joint logistics systems agency.	
Navy	Lieutenant Kevin James Davidson RAN	For meritorious service to the Royal Australian Navy in the field of personnel administration, both as a sailor and as an officer.	
Army	Warrant Officer Class 1 Garry John Brown	For meritorious service to the Australian Defence Force and to the Australian Army in the fields of Communications and Information Systems.	
Army	Major William James Norton	For meritorious service to the Australian Defence Force in facilitating offensive air support to the Australian Army as the Officer Commanding of 67 Ground Liaison Section.	
Army	Captain Stephen Roger Pilmore RFD	For meritorious service to the Australian Defence Force in the field of Special Forces' Communications and Procedures, particularly with the 1st Commando Regiment.	
Army	Warrant Officer Class 1 George Russell	For meritorious service to the Australian Army, particularly to the Royal Australian Army Medical Corps.	
Army	Warrant Officer Class 1 Garry David Satterley	For meritorious service to the Australian Defence Force as the works manager in Papua New Guinea, and to the Army's Aboriginal and Torres Strait Islander Commission Community Assistance Project.	
Air Force	Warrant Officer Paul Robert Waterworth	For meritorious service to the Royal Australian Navy in the field of technical support.	
Air Force	Warrant Officer Peter Donald Alomes	For meritorious service to the Australian Defence Force, particularly in the management of non-public moneys.	
Air Force	Warrant Officer Geoffrey Gordon Ingram	For meritorious service to the Royal Australian Air Force in T56 Engine Logistics Management.	
Air Force	Warrant Officer Owen Daniel McNamara	For meritorious service to the RAAF as the Warrant Officer Engineer of No 38 Squadron, as the Strike Reconnaissance Logistics Management Squadron Warrant Officer, and as the Warrant Officer Engineer of No 76 Squadron.	
