= Paramount Records (disambiguation) =

Paramount Records was an American record label known for its recordings of jazz and blues in the 1920s and early 1930s.

Paramount Records may also refer to:

- ABC Records, an American record label founded in New York, branded ABC-Paramount (1955–1966)
- Paramount Records (1969), an American record label started in 1969 by Paramount Pictures
- Paramount Records (Australia), a record company formed by record producer Bill Armstrong in the 1950s

== See also ==
- Paramount Music, a 2015 revival of the 1969 Paramount Records company
