= Swaggie Records =

Australian jazz record label

Swaggie Records was a jazz record company and label founded in 1949 by Graeme Bell in Australia. The label's early years were defined by recordings by Australian jazz musicians. In 1952, it was sold to pianist Nevill Sherburn. In the 1960s, it made licensing deals with American companies for vintage jazz reissues on 7-inch LPs. Similar programs followed in the 1970s (12-inch LPs) though the 1990s (CDs). By 1989, Swaggie was longest-lived jazz label in Australia with the largest catalogue. In 2015, Australian music producer Bill Armstrong bought the label, later donating several tracks first to an Australian non-profit for road crew, and later to the National Film and Sound Archive.

== History ==
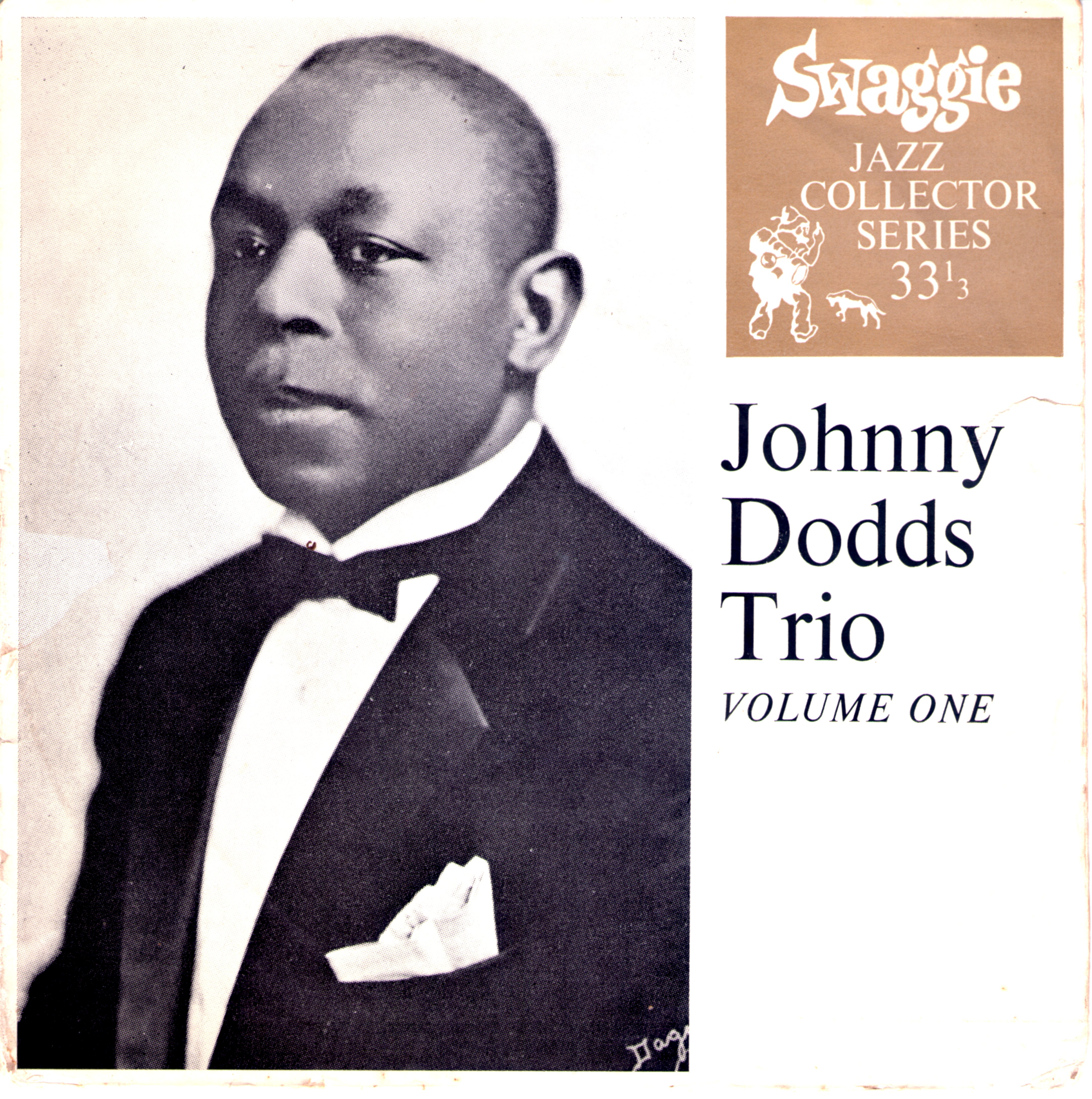
Cover of Volume One of the Jazz Collector Series

Swaggie was founded by the Graeme Bell co-operative band, Graeme and Roger Bell, Ade Monsbourgh, Don "Pixie" Roberts, and Lou Silbereisen, who registered as the proprietors of the business name Swaggie.

During the 1940s, the Metropole Hotel in Bourke Street, Melbourne, was a popular drinking bar for Melbourne jazz musicians and friends. Graeme Bell and his musicians were among the regular patrons and it was here that discussions on forming the band's own record label began. The name Swaggie was chosen, and a fellow patron, commercial artist Tim Nichol, drew the original Swagman and Dog logo.

The first recordings for the Swaggie label were made with the Graeme Bell Australian Jazz Band at the AWA Sydney studio on 24 October 1949. Between November 1949 and September 1950, Swaggie held several Graeme Bell band recording sessions in the Melbourne studio of Broadcast Exchange of Australia (BEA) to build a library of master recordings, and from these masters five 10-inch 78 rpm records, numbered S1 to S5, were manufactured and distributed for retail sale.

In late 1952, a decision was made to wind-up the co-operative band and the Swaggie business was sold to Nevill Sherburn in 1954. For some months, Sherburn had been corresponding with Milt Gabler, founder of Commodore Records and United Hot Clubs of America labels in the US, who was most helpful and encouraging to Sherburn's endeavour to produce a similar label in Australia with Swaggie.

All the existing Swaggie 78 rpm masters, issued and unissued, were transferred to magnetic tape masters by Nevill Sherburn for release on 10-inch LP and 7-inch EP albums, with covers designed by Clement Meadmore. In addition, two 10-inch 78 rpm records (S7 and S8) by Duke Ellington and his Kentucky Club Orchestra 1926-1927 were pressed on vinyl and released.

During its first decade, Swaggie was devoted mainly to the documentation of Australian jazz, especially the traditional revival, and continued this role into the 1980s. However, the label expanded its concerns in the early 1960s when it issued the extensive Jazz Collector Series of vintage jazz reissues, on 7-inch 33 1/3 LPs. This material, drawn from major American companies, was obtained by leasing agreements with their Australian branches and agents. This series was succeeded in January 1966 with a similar series of 12-inch LPs, The Jazz Makers, which drew mainly on American and European labels.

In 1980, an additional 12-inch LP series, Vintage Jazz Archives, was introduced and devoted to the definitively programmed chronological reissues of early jazz. Swaggie recorded visiting jazz artists in Australia and participated in international recording sessions, especially in New York and New Orleans, to form an extensive jazz archive. Introduction of the compact disc and the use of digital recording technology during remastering of the original analog master tapes for CD replication enabled Sherburn to expand the Swaggie catalogue.

A researcher wrote in 1989 that Swaggies was the longest-lived jazz label in Australia with the largest catalogue, which he attributed largely to have retained a fairly conservative approach in its choices of artist.

From June 2006 to January 2007, the Victorian Jazz Archive (now Australian Jazz Museum) presented the Bilarm and Swaggie Exhibition.

In 2015, Melbourne music producer and jazz enthusiast Bill Armstrong (1929–2026) bought Swaggie Records.

== Re-releases and archives ==
In 2024, Armstrong donated a number of historic recordings from his Bilarm Music and Swaggie Records catalogues to the Australian Road Crew Association (ARCA), in order to raise funds for road crews by reissuing the music. The releases, which included 42 albums, were reissued on CD and physical formats on ARCA's own label, Black Box Records, through MGM Distribution, from 7 June 2024.

Armstrong also donated hundreds of Australian jazz audio items, including from the Swaggie Records catalogue, to the National Film and Sound Archive, where they are preserved for posterity.

== Significance ==
Swaggie Records was the longest-lived jazz record label with the largest catalogue in 1989.

Jazz historian Bill Haesler wrote that "without Swaggie Records there would be very little recorded Australian jazz from the 1960s-1980s".

== Artists ==
Artists recorded on the Swaggie label include:

- Bob Barnard
- Len Barnard
- John Sangster
- Roger Bell
- Lazy Ade Monsbourgh
- Earl Hines
- Armand Hug
- Bob Crosby's Bob Cats
- Jimmie Noone
- Pearce-Pickering Barrelhouse Jazz Band
- Teddy Wilson & Marian McPartland
- The Don Burrows Quintet
- Don Burrows with special guest James Morrison, in a tribute to Benny Goodman
- Smacka Fitzgibbon
- Tom Baker's San Francisco Jazz Band
- Steve Waddell's Creole Bells
