= Bill Armstrong (music producer) =

Australian music producer (1929–2026)

- Born: Victoria, Australia
- Occupation: Music producer
- Years active: 1948–2026
- Known for: Armstrong Studios

William Richard "Bill" Armstrong AM (24 June 1929 – 7 August 2026) was an Australian music producer. He is known for his founding and running Armstrong Studios from 1965 to the mid-1970s, where many Australian and international hit songs were recorded and was dubbed "Australia's Abbey Road". From the mid-70s to the mid-80s he worked in radio, notably as managing director of EON FM, the forerunner of Triple M Melbourne. He also created his own record labels: Paramount, Magnasound, and Danceland in his early career; and jazz label Bilarm Music in 1986; in 2015 he acquired jazz label Swaggie Records. He is also known for his preservation of jazz music, interviews, and other content that would otherwise have been lost.

== Early life and education ==
William Richard Armstrong was born on 24 June 1929 and grew up in the Melbourne suburb of East Malvern.

He studied electrical engineering student at Caulfield Tech (later part of Monash University).

== Career ==
=== Recording and production ===
Armstrong began his career recording his friends' bands onto wire. He built his own machine for cutting records, and aged 19 recorded jazz artists such as Smacka Fitzgibbon from his parents' house. His friend, audio technician, Neil McCrae, helped to build an amplifier.

He founded Bill Armstrong Sound in 1949, which led to a variety of work including recording of court proceedings and civil ceremonies. These included recordings of Robert Menzies opening Geelong's Shell refinery. He recorded live jazz performances, including the 1949 Australian Jazz Convention, and created acetate copies for the performers to purchase.

He started Bill Armstrong Sound in December 1949, and in the early 1950s began releasing local jazz records on his own record labels, Paramount, Magnasound, and Danceland. He then worked for ABC Radio producing broadcasts, and was in charge of the PA system at the Melbourne Olympic Games in 1956.

He was appointed manager of Telefilm recording at film studios in St Kilda, where he led a team that recorded jingles and pre-recorded music for TV programs such as Sunnyside Up and The Go!! Show. From 1956 to 1960, Armstrong worked for W&G Records, and recorded musicians such as Graeme Bell and the Seekers, and commercial jingles.

After sound engineer Roger Savage arrived from England, he and Armstrong set up Armstrong Studios in 1965 and recorded artists such as Russell Morris, Daddy Cool, John Farnham, Skyhooks and Graham Kennedy. They were credited with recording 80% of the music in the Australian charts at the time. Armstrong became well known as a music producer, dubbed a "pioneer of pop". He later paid tribute to Savage, whom he liked personally and who contributed greatly to the success of the studio.

In the early to mid-1970s, The Age bought Armstrong's share of the business, and the company was renamed Armstrong Audio Video (AAV). Armstrong remained as a company director until 1974. In 1977, Armstrong began to work for SBS Radio, before starting EON FM, Australia's first commercial FM radio station, where he worked as managing director.

Armstrong left EON in 1986 and set up the jazz label Bilarm Music, where he continued to work into 2015.

=== Music preservation ===
Armstrong was "a passionate advocate for preserving the nation's musical heritage throughout his life", according to APRA AMCOS, and over the years built up a large personal archive of music that may have otherwise been lost. He preserved the music of some very significant Australian jazz musicians, and he had both personal and professional relationships with many of them over many years, including Graeme Bell, Len and Bob Barnard, and Smacka Fitzgibbon.

He collaborated with Barry Humphries on a jazz history series of recordings. Together they produced four double-CD sets under Armstrong's Bilarm label, comprising a collection of rare performances, interviews, and archival material. The series was titled So Rare, and was re-released on digital services in May 2024.

In 2015 Armstrong purchased Swaggie Records, a jazz label which had been founded in 1949 by members of Graeme Bell's Australian Jazz Band and later acquired by pianist Nevill Sherburn.

In his later years, Armstrong spent time finding, restoring, and re-releasing historic recordings, using modern technology to recover fragile material that existed only on old media such as tapes and wire recordings. In 2024, he donated historic recordings from his Bilarm Music and Swaggie Records catalogues to the Australian Road Crew Association (ARCA), in order to raise funds for road crews by reissuing the music. The releases, which included 42 albums, were reissued on CD and physical formats on ARCA's own label, Black Box Records, through MGM Distribution, from 7 June 2024.

In 2024, aged 95, Armstrong was still engaged with music. In that year he undertook an interview with Australian Musician that was to be included in the Oral History archive of the National Association of Music Merchants, an American nonprofit organisation.

== Other roles ==
Armstrong became a member of APRA AMCOS in 1959.

== Recognition and awards ==
- 1995 – Advance Australia Award
- 1995 – Audio Engineering Society (of US) Australian chapter, Lifetime Achievement Award
- 1995 – Australasian Sound Recording Association award for "Outstanding Service to The Australian Recording Industry"
- 1999 – ARIA Special Achievement Award
- 2006 – APRA Ted Albert Award for Outstanding Services to Australian Music
- 2011 – National Film and Sound Archive's Cochrane-Smith Award for Sound Heritage
- 2015 – Member of the Order of Australia in the Queen's Birthday Honours List, "For significant service to the commercial music recording industry through pioneering roles, and to the broadcast media sector"
- 2015 – The Age Music Victoria Hall of Fame

== Death and legacy ==
Armstrong died on 7 August 2026 at the age of 97.

He is particularly remembered for Armstrong Studios, which, owing to its having produced so many hit records, earned monikers such as "the Hit Factory" and "Australia's Abbey Road". Brendan Watkins, who is writing a book about the studios, writes that Armstrong became known as "the father of the Australian recording industry".

The National Film and Sound Archive acknowledged Armstrong's "enormous contribution to Australia's sound heritage", which included his donation of hundreds of audio items to the NFSA.

In June 2024, ARCA was in discussions with "a major awards show" to establish a Bill Armstrong Award that recognised "behind-the-scene champions" for music, such as outstanding crew members. The organisation also hoped to create a Bill Armstrong bequest funded by government bodies, to be awarded to emerging studio producers and engineers.
