= Ian Porter =

Ian Porter may refer to:

- Ian Porter (actor) (born 1965), American actor now living in the UK
- Ian Porter (politician) (1950–1999), Australian local politician
- Ian Porter (rugby union) (born 1988), rugby union player from Ireland
- Ian Porter (rower), Australian rower
