= List of RAAF inland aircraft fuel depots =

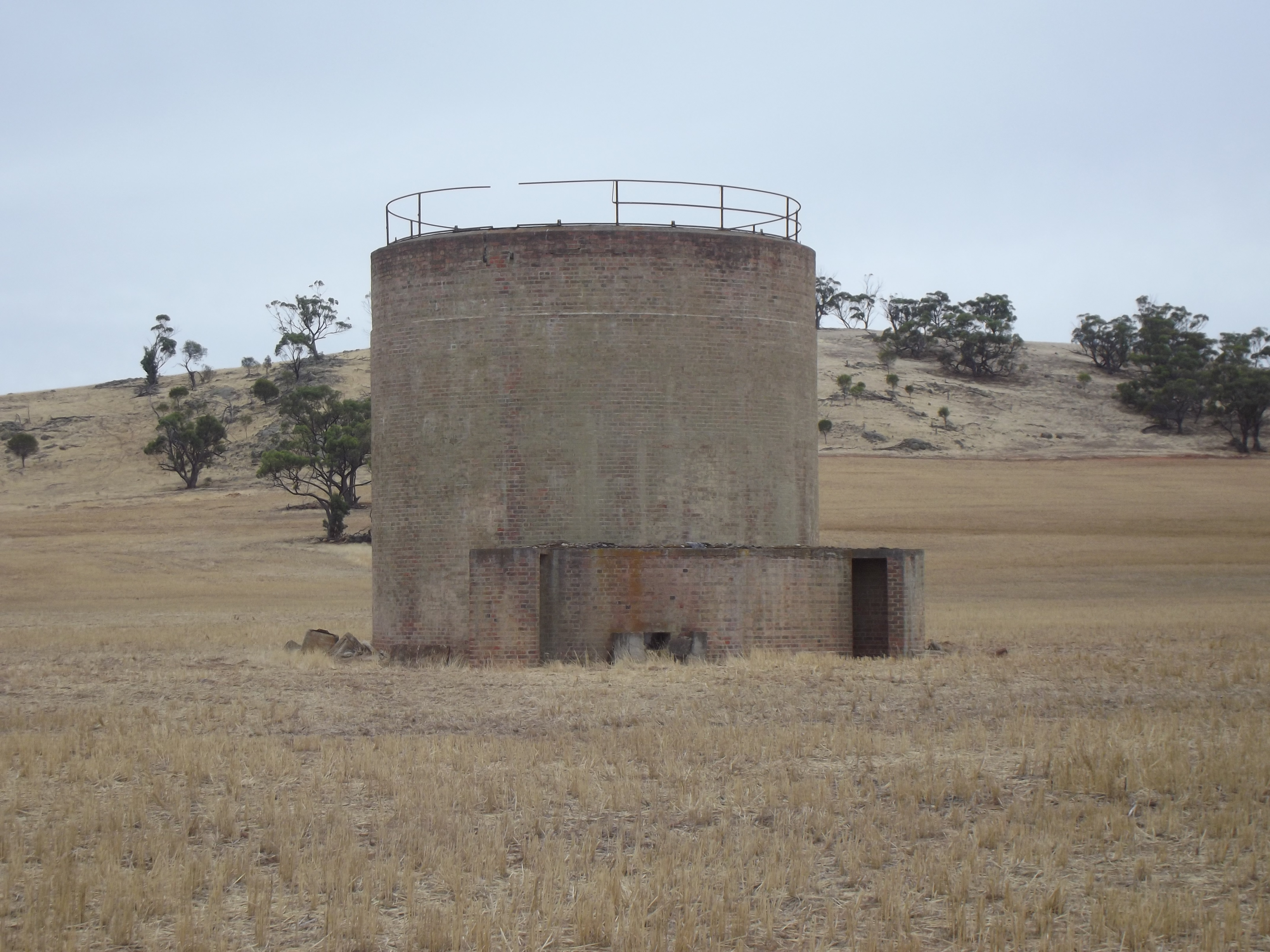
No 1 Fuel Tank, RAAF No.10IAFD, Northam, Western Australia, 2013

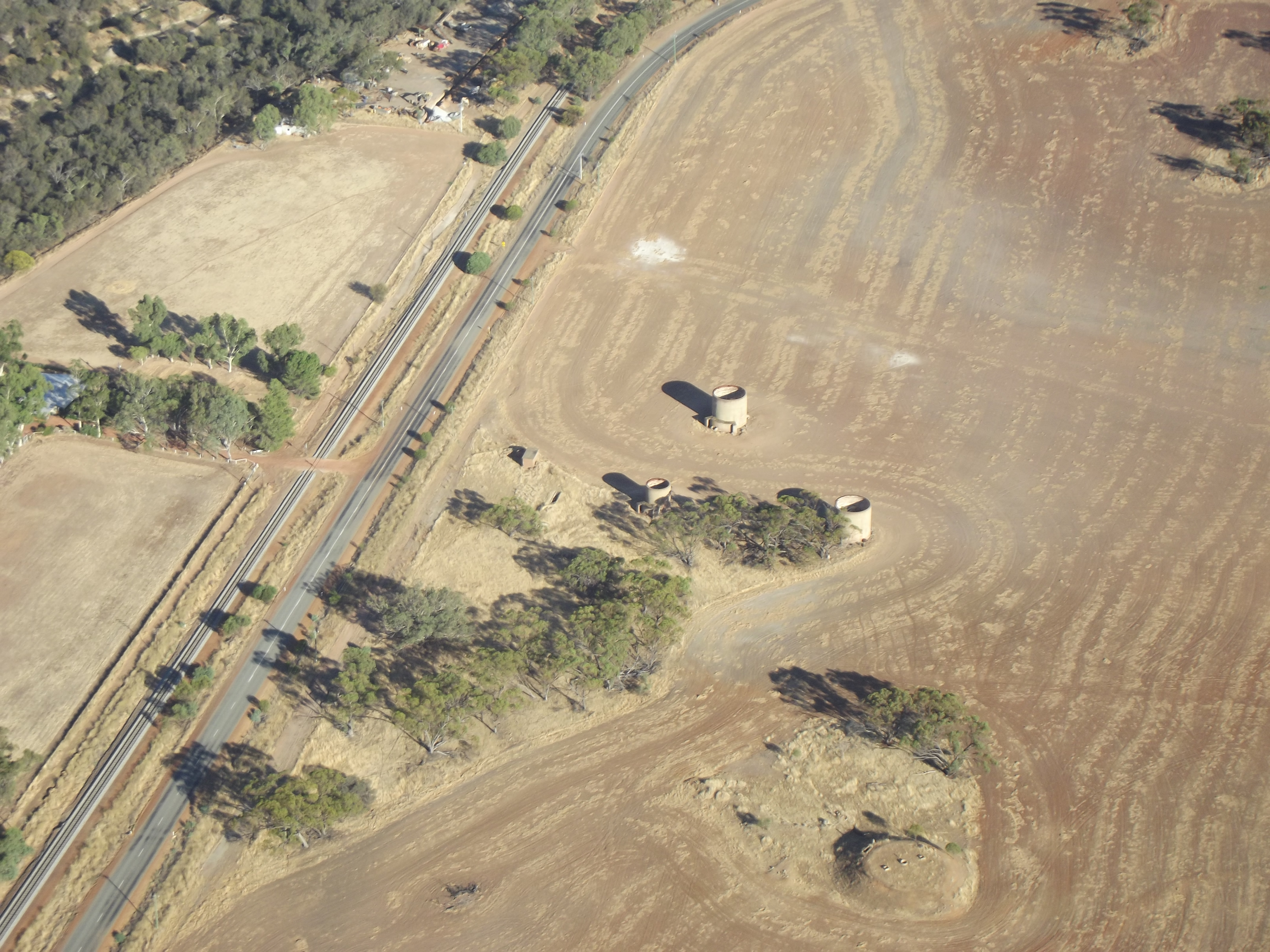
Aerial view of RAAF No.10 IAFD –Northam, note underground tank

In 1939, with the commencement of World War II, the Chief of the Air Staff of the Royal Australian Air Force (RAAF) identified the necessity to increase bulk storage and supply of aviation fuel across Australia for the purpose of defending Australia. An investigative committee was created to determine the most strategic, safe locations and the design of the storage facilities. It identified that 31 inland aircraft fuel depots (IAFDs) were required to be constructed for the storage of aircraft fuel, built from brick, concrete and steel.

The sites were to be located inland to enhance protection from air attack and would hold 20,760,000 gallons (93,420,000 litres) of aircraft fuel. Eleven were built in New South Wales, six in Queensland, four in Victoria, four in Western Australia, four in South Australia, one in Tasmania and one in the Northern Territory.

Originally some of the depots stored fuel in drums and were referred to as ‘Inland Storages for Reserves of Aviation Spirit’ and others designated ‘RAAF Inland Storage Depots’ which were later referred to as ‘RAAF Inland Petrol Depot (RIPDs)’. With another later standardisation of the name, these depots were finally designated ‘Inland Aircraft Fuel Depot’ The eventual construction of these brick and steel tanks was substantially carried out by the Allied Works Council made up of bricklayers, carpenters and manual labour.

The total 31 IAFDs were in full operation by early 1944 with all sites located close to railway lines for access by rail tankers, but were situated well away from the airfields they serviced, for safety, as these were bulk storage facilities. Fuel would be transported from the IAFD to the airfield fuel tanks by road tanker. In close co-operation with the United States Army Air Corps the costs and fuel distribution were shared with the RAAF with the USAAC having additional bulk inland fuel storages at 13 of the 31 IAFDs.

== Names and locations ==
The following list gives details of Inland Aircraft Fuel Depots across Australia during World War II:

IAFD Number	Location	State	Commissioned	De-commissioned
No. 1	Ballarat	Victoria	1942	29 August 1944
No. 2	Warragul	Victoria	1942	14 June 1944
No. 3	Cootamundra	New South Wales	1942	14 June 1944
No. 4	Wallerawang	New South Wales	1942	1944
No. 5	Muswellbrook	New South Wales	1942	29 August 1944
No. 6	Grafton	New South Wales	1942	29 August 1944
No. 7	Toowoomba	Queensland	1942	29 August 1944
No. 8	Gayndah	Queensland	1942	29 August 1944
No. 9	Charters Towers	Queensland	1 June 1942	29 August 1944
No. 10	Northam	Western Australia	1942	14 June 1944
No. 11	Solomontown (Port Pirie)	South Australia	1942	14 June 1944
No. 12	Wolseley	South Australia	1942	14 June 1944
No.13	Violet Town (Seymour)	Victoria	1942	14 June 1944
No. 14	Tocumwal	New South Wales	1942	14 June 1944
No. 15	Deniliquin	New South Wales	1942	14 June 1944
No. 16	Lake Bathurst (Goulburn)	New South Wales	1942	1944
No. 17	Uranquinty (Wagga Wagga)	New South Wales	1942	29 August 1944
No. 18	Parkes	New South Wales	1942	14 August 1944
No. 19	Narromine (Dubbo)	New South Wales	1942	14 June 1944
No. 20	Tamworth	New South Wales	1942	14 June 1944
No. 21	Yarraman	Queensland	1942	29 August 1944
No. 22	Roma	Queensland	1942	29 August 1944
No. 23	Cloncurry	Queensland	1942	14 August 1944
No. 24	Alice Springs	Northern Territory	20 May 1942	November 1944
No. 25	Narrogin	Western Australia	1942	14 June 1942
No. 26	Merredin	Western Australia	1942	29 April 1944
No. 27	Boulder (Kalgoorlie)	Western Australia	1942	14 June 1944
No. 28	Gladstone	South Australia	1942	14 June 1944
No. 29	Yelta (Mildura)	Victoria	1942	14 June 1944
No. 30	Ross, Tasmania (Mona Vale)	Tasmania	1942	14 June 1944
No. 31	Crystal Brook	South Australia	1942	14 June 1944
