= Elizabeth Galloway Bell =

Australian Buddhist leader (1911–2007)

Elizabeth Galloway Bell OAM

Personal life
- Born: Elizabeth Watson; 16 September 1911 Melbourne, Victoria
- Died: 16 March 2007 (aged 95) Richmond, Victoria
- Spouse: Graeme Bell (m. 1946; div. 1961)
- Children: 1

Religious life
- Religion: Buddhism

Elizabeth Galloway Bell OAM (née Watson; 10 September 1911 – 16 March 2007) was an Australian buddhist and president of the Buddhist Society of Victoria for twenty years. She also served as chair of the Buddhism Federation of Australia, and editor of the journal Metta. She helped organize the first visit of the Dalai Lama to Australia, and was a delegate to the World Conference on Religions for Peace, held in Melbourne in 1984. She received the medal of the Order of Australia in 1999 for her contributions to Buddhism in Australia.

== Biography ==
Elizabeth Watson was born in Melbourne, Australia, on 16 September 1911. Her parents, William and Christina Watson, had emigrated to Australia from Scotland in 1907. Her father was a ship's master. Bell was their eldest daughter. A son, Thomas, was born two years later. She attended Coburg High School, and worked in a flower shop.

Bell married Graeme Bell, a jazz musician, in 1946. Graeme Bell was one of the early pioneers of jazz in Australia. At the time of their marriage, Graeme had his own band, the Dixieland Jazz Band, which was growing in popularity. In 1947, they were invited to play at the World Youth Festival in Czechoslovakia; they stayed oversees for a year and toured in Europe. Bell joined her husband while his band was touring. In 1950, while again traveling overseas, Bell gave birth to their only child, Christina, in England. Bell and Graeme later divorced. Graeme moved to Sydney, and remarried. Bell stayed in Victoria, and raised their daughter there.

Among her other interests, Bell wrote poetry, and her poem "Ern Malley's Sister" was published in Quadrant magazine in 2006.

Bell died on 16 March 2007, in Richmond, Victoria, at age 95.

== Leadership in Buddhist societies ==
Bell started practicing in Buddhism in 1963. Raised in the Presbyterian church, she found herself drawn to Buddhist teachings. She became a member of the Buddhist Society of Victoria, which was the oldest Buddhist society in Australia, established in 1953. She became president in the 1970s and served for over twenty years in that role. She hosted gatherings at her house, and welcomed many guests. In 1975, she oversaw the purchase of a house to be used for holding lectures and events, known as the Buddhist House.

Bell served on the committee that organized the 1982 visit of the Dalai Lama to Australia. At the time, the Dalai Lama was not well known in the country, outside Buddhist circles. The historic visit, the Dalai Lama's first to Australia, was a relatively quiet and low-key affair, planned by local volunteers.

Bell was also involved in the national Buddhist Federation of Australia, and became chairwoman in the 1970s. In the late 1980s, she served as editor of the federation's magazine Metta. In 1984, when the fourth World Conference on Religions and Peace was held in Melbourne, Bell attended as a delegate. In 1986, she authored a short history on the development of buddhism in Victoria.

As part of the 1999 Queen's Birthday Honours, Bell received the Medal of the Order of Australia, in recognition of her contributions to Buddhism.

== See also ==
- Buddhism in Australia
- Henry Steel Olcott
- 1999 Queen's Birthday Honours (Australia)
