= Jack Mitchell (jazz historian) =

Australian jazz historian (1926–2021)

Jack Mitchell OAM
- Born: Francis John Mitchell; 29 May 1926; Randwick, New South Wales, Australia
- Died: 11 March 2021 (aged 94); Lithgow, New South Wales
- Occupations: jazz historian, discographer

Francis John "Jack" Mitchell OAM (29 May 1926-11 March 2021) was an Australian jazz historian and discographer.

== Life ==
Jack Mitchell was born in Sydney in 1926. His first job was an assistant cinema projectionist, before he entered university in 1948 to become a dentist. After becoming a member of the Sydney Swing Music Club in 1944, Mitchell began reading Australian jazz journal Jazz Notes, and became interested in jazz history and discographies.

He contributed jazz discography articles to journals such as Jazz Notes, before he published Australian Discography in 1950, a 16 page handbook published by Australian Jazz Quarterly. A second edition was self-published in 1960, and a third edition was being prepared in the 1970s. This had begun being serialised over seven issues in the magazine Music Maker, before that title closed in 1970. The project was finally published as the book Australian Jazz on Record 1925–80, published by the National Film and Sound Archive in 1988, with further volumes published in 1998 and 2002. Corrections for his books were published in the journal Matrix, where Mitchell published a column also listing new releases in Australian jazz. He also contributed to Australian Jazz and Record Review, Jazz, Jazz Journal, Storyville, the Sydney Jazz Club's Quarterly Rag, the Victorian Jazz Club's Jazzline, and the Australian Jazz Museum's AJazz.

In 2011, his entire discography project was collected as a CD-ROM titled Australian Jazz on Record 1923–2010, and it continued to receive updates up to his death. Mitchell also contributed the discography for Graeme Bell's autobiography in 1988. The two had met during the 1960s, and Bell provided the forward to Mitchell's Australian Jazz on Record 1925–80.

Outside of his discography work, Mitchell wrote other books documenting jazz history, such as Coggy a biography on Australian trombonist and bandleader Frank Coughlan, Blistered Heels : Jazz and hot dance music in Australia in the twenties, and Happy Feet on Australian popular music in the 1930s. He also assisted the Australian Jazz Museum with their research and contributed songs from his collection to some of their Australian jazz compilation albums, and presented a program Jazz Cabaret on Lithgow Community Radio EZY-FM 90.5 between 2004-2019.

In 2019, Mitchell received an Order of Australia award for service to jazz music.

Following his death in 2021, Jack Mitchell's collection was left to the Australian Jazz Museum.

== Bibliography ==
- Australian discography (edited by William H. Miller.) (1950)
- Australian Jazz on Record 1925–80 (1988)
- Graeme Bell, Australian jazzman : his autobiography, with discography (discography only) (1988)
- Back together again! : the story of the Port Jackson Jazz Band (1995)
- More Australian jazz on record (1998)
- Jazzdags (1999)
- Emajor : even more Australian jazz on record (2002)
- Coggy (2011)
- Australian Jazz on Record 1923–2010 (2011)
- Blistered heels : Jazz and hot dance music in Australia in the twenties (2015)
- Happy feet : Dancing and swinging in Australia in the thirties (2018)
