= Gary Pemberton =

Australian business executive

Gary Milton Pemberton AC (born 1940) is an Australian business executive.

Pemberton is best known for being the former chairman of Brambles, Qantas (1993–2000), TAB, Racing NSW and Billabong.

He was president of the Sydney Organising Committee for the Olympic Games and a commissioner for the Australian Rugby League Commission. Pemberton was on the boards of companies such as Rio Tinto, the Commonwealth Bank and John Fairfax Holdings.

Pemberton was appointed a Companion of the Order of Australia (AC) in the 1999 Queen's Birthday Honours in recognition of his service to business, finance, public service reform and the community. He was elected a Fellow of the Australian Academy of Technological Sciences and Engineering in 1993.

Business positions
Preceded by Bill Dix	Chairperson of Qantas; 1993–2000	Succeeded by Margaret Jackson
