= Ian Porter (politician) =

Australian politician (1950–1999)

Ian Slade Porter OAM
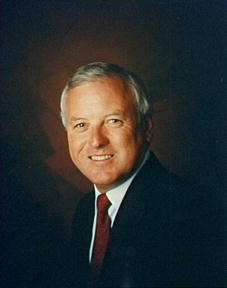
- Born: 15 August 1950; Port Macquarie, NSW
- Died: 13 August 1999 (aged 48)

Ian Slade Porter OAM (15 August 1950 – 13 August 1999) was an Australian local government official. He was General Manager of Campbelltown City Council from 1988 to 1999 and Deputy Town Clerk of Bankstown City Council from 1978 to 1988.

== Biography ==
Ian Porter was born and raised in Port Macquarie, situated on the New South Wales Mid North Coast. After completing his higher school certificate in 1968 he moved to Sydney to pursue a career in Local Government. He studied and gained his Town Clerks certificate at the Meadowbank Technical College (now Meadowbank TAFE) and in 1976 Porter married Judy, having two sons Andrew and Nicholas.

== Career ==
=== Bankstown City Council ===
Porter started as a computer operator at Bankstown City Council in 1968. He became Deputy Town Clerk when he was 28 years old.

=== Campbelltown City Council ===
Porter was appointed Campbelltown Council Town Clerk in 1988. The title of his position changed to General Manager in 1992. He was on the Council for 12 years, during which Campbelltown expanded rapidly – the Council controlled a staff 700 and a budget of $100 million. He was a leader of the Institute of Municipal Management. He was awarded the Order of Australia for his services to local government as part of the 1999 Queen's Birthday Honours.

== Other activities ==
Porter was a lecturer in local government administration, a member of the UWS Macarthur Council and Chairman of the UWS Macarthur Consultative Committee. A scholarship was established in his name.

In 1999 one of the galleries of the Campbelltown Arts Centre was renamed the Ian Porter Gallery in commemoration of Ian.

== Death ==
Porter was diagnosed with Acute lymphoblastic leukaemia (ALL) in July 1998. Porter died on Friday 13 August 1999, two days before his 49th birthday.
