= Cootamundra World War II Fuel Depot =

Heritage-listed former fuel depot in NSW, Australia

- Location within New South Wales Location within Australia
- 34.6519°S 148.0148°E
- Location: 219 Sutton Street, Cootamundra, New South Wales, Australia

History
- Built: 1941–1943

Site notes
- Owner: Ampol; Cootamundra–Gundagai Regional Council

New South Wales Heritage Register
- Official name: Cootamundra World War II Fuel Depot Site (former No.3 AIFD); Inland Aircraft Fuel Depot No.3; IAFD No.3; former World War II RAAF base; Petrol tanks; Caltex Service Station
- Type: State heritage (complex / group)
- Designated: 27 February 2015
- Reference no.: 1943
- Type: Other - Military
- Category: Defence

Cootamundra World War II Fuel Depot is a heritage-listed former fuel depot and Royal Australian Air Force (RAAF) stores depot and now public park at 219 Sutton Street, Cootamundra, New South Wales, Australia. It was built from 1941 to 1943. It is also known as Cootamundra World War II Fuel Depot Site (former No.3 AIFD), Inland Aircraft Fuel Depot No.3, IAFD No.3, former World War II RAAF base, Petrol tanks and Ampol service station. The property is owned by Ampol and the Cootamundra–Gundagai Regional Council, a local government authority. The depot was added to the New South Wales State Heritage Register on 27 February 2015.

== History ==
=== Aboriginal land ===
The traditional owners of Cootamundra are the Wiradjuri, for whom the Murrumbidgee River was a plentiful source of shellfish and fish. Plants, tubers and nuts of the country between the major rivers supplied seasonal food. Larger game such as possums, kangaroos and emus were captured by groups of hunters to make up a varied and nutritious diet.

The dislocation by European colonists of normal Aboriginal routines of life was increasingly severe from the 1830s and the new diseases took a terrible toll. There were predictable problems over cattle. A series of incidents along the Murrumbidgee near Narrandera c. 1840 have been called the "Wiradjuri wars". The result was that the Wiradjuri were deprived of their riverine territory and driven to the hills or to local employment on the stations. Men worked as cattlemen, general hands, sheep-shearers and flour grinders, and women as domestic servants and child carers. Ultimately many Wiradjuri people ended up living in the towns established to service those who had supplanted them. By the late nineteenth century few of the surviving Wiradjuri people lived a traditional life. The numerous towns of the area, which became closely settled with irrigation schemes during the twentieth century, contained an increasing Aboriginal population. Today in the region, most Wiradjuri people live in Narrandera and Griffith, with significant numbers in Wagga Wagga, Leeton and Tumut and smaller communities in Junee, Harden, Young and Cootamundra.

=== Colonisation and early history of Cootamundra ===
In 1829 the first British explorer Charles Sturt ventured into the Murrumbidgee Valley. Within 15 years most of the water frontages along the Murrumbidgee were occupied by pastoralists. John Hurley and Patrick Fennell obtained permissions to pasture stock on the Coramundra Run in the 1830s, which by 1849 had grown to 20,234 hectares (50,000 acres) with an estimated grazing capacity of 600 cattle and 3,000 sheep. Meat prices soared in the 1850s and the Murrumbidgee stations "became a vast fattening paddock".

Cootamundra was surveyed and a plan of the proposed village was drawn up by surveyor P. Adams in 1861 on a site that was originally the horse paddock of John Hurley's station. The first town lots were sold in 1862. Like many other towns in the Riverina, Cootamundra's population increased with the brief gold rush of the 1860s. By 1866, the village had a population of 100, a post office, a police station and two hotels. The succeeding decades saw the triumph of sheep over cattle particularly on the saltbush plains at the western end of the region. The corollary of this pastoral expansion was the clearing of much of the bush, the sinking of wells, the building of dams for stock and the systematic fencing of paddocks.

The rail network helped in the growth of farming industries. Cootamundra's train station, linking into the main southern railway that links Sydney and Melbourne, opened in 1877. The development of Cootamundra was slow and steady and it was gazetted on 20 May 1884 as a municipality of 1,218 hectares (3,010 acres). The town was finally gazetted as Cootamundra in 1952, changed from the official name of Cootamundry by which it had been known since 1860. The locals had always used the name Cootamundra. It became a quiet yet prosperous agricultural community. As of 2009, Cootamundra had a population of around 7,500 in the whole shire with a further 2,000 in the surrounding district.

=== Cootamunda early aviation history ===
The aviation history of Cootamundra began in 1917 when W. J. Stutt landed in a paddock near the Cootamundra Showground in his Curtiss biplane during a flight that established a long-distance record for Australia:

"Pilot Stutt's plane arrived at Cootamundra well up to time at 10.10. A good landing was effected in an open paddock next to the showground and cheers were given. Lieut. Stutt said the trip had been rough. Rain fell so heavily much of the way from Wangaratta that it chipped the phlange of the propeller, which needed some little attention. The driver and pilot left for refreshments while the machine was being replenished with oil and benzene. A big crowd collected. At 11.30 the aeroplane rose, and headed for Sydney. . . . [He] shaped his course by the railway line northward. Passing over Goulburn at 12.40 Pilot Stutt kept to the route until thunderstorms over Moss Vale met him and drove him out to sea. He made back to Picton, however, and continued with fairly good weather . . ."

— Windsor and Richmond Gazette; Friday, 16 November 1917.

By 1921 the strategic advantage of Cootamundra's location about mid-way between Sydney and Melbourne led to the Australian Government purchasing 30 hectares (75 acres) of Quinlan's paddock on the northern edge of the town, making Cootamundra one of NSW's earliest rural aerodromes. With the implementation of an airmail service between Australia and Britain, Cootamundra was chosen as the southern terminus. The airfield was used as a base for airmail contracts temporarily from 1934 by Butler Air Transport, providing connection to Qantas services between Brisbane and Darwin. However the company relocated its base to Sydney when the airmail contract was withdrawn in 1938.

=== World War II and aviation in Australia ===
When Australia entered World War II in September 1939 on the side of Great Britain, the war was far distant in Europe. However Australia soon became part of an international scheme to train pilots and aircrew across the British Empire. Known as the Empire Air Training Scheme (EATS), the scheme was instrumental in up-skilling many of the airmen who fought in Europe, the Middle East and the Mediterranean. A full range of training aerodromes had to be created to implement the scheme, which included initial training schools, elementary flying training schools, service flying training school and the air observers' schools. By the late 1930s the presence of the well-established aviation facilities at Cootamundra and its convenient location on the Sydney Melbourne railway line made it ideal for the use of the aerodrome as a military base and EATS training facility. Gough Whitlam, later Prime Minister of Australia 1972–75, received navigation training at the No.1 Air Observer's School at Cootamundra for several months in late 1942.

Aerodromes were also needed for training, maintenance and defence to meet the needs of the Royal Australian Air Force (RAAF). Airfields were redeveloped across NSW including Cootamundra as well as Mascot, Narromine, Tamworth, Narrandera, Temora, Uranquinty, Deniliquin, Parkes, Camden, Evans Head, Wagga Wagga. By 1940 the Royal Australian Air Force had completely taken over the control of the Cootamundra aerodrome and Squadron Numbers 60 and 73 operated from the base.

A direction finding station was also built at Cootamundra to service the radio communications system. This system was considered vital in the detection of enemy raiders and for providing data in battle situations.

The presence of the No.1 Air Observer's School, the Cootamundra aerodrome, the convenient location on the Sydney-Melbourne railway line and its safe location inland made Cootamundra an ideal choice for locating the No.3 Inland Aircraft Fuel Depot (IAFD), now known as the Cootamundra World War II Fuel Depot Site.

=== World War II, Cootamundra and the inland fuel depots ===
A major issue servicing the Royal Australian Air Force during World War II was the provision and distribution of aviation fuel. Transport was difficult due to the large distances involved and the diversity of Australia's railway gauges. Existing storage facilities were small and located only in New South Wales and Victoria, making the supply to combat units stationed in the north particularly impractical and difficult.

An Aviation Fuel Committee was formed with representatives from the Australian and American air forces. Following a war cabinet minute in August 1940 approving an increase in war reserves of aviation fuel, the committee recommended the erection of bulk storage fuel depots in inland locations, safe from attack by sea-borne aircraft. Twelve sites were initially commissioned throughout Australia, chosen on the basis of their proximity to railways, roads and aerodromes, with four of these in NSW: at Cootamundra, Wallerawang, Muswellbrook and Grafton. While originally known as RAAF (Royal Australian Air Force) Inland Petrol Depots they were soon renamed Inland Aircraft Fuel Depots (IAFD). Cootamundra was the third site to be commissioned nationally and the first in NSW, and became known as No.3 Inland Aircraft Fuel Depot.

The committee developed various recommendations for regulating the storage sites. A typical IAFD complex was to consist of standard tanks, a 182,000-litre (40,000 imp gal) mixing tank, pumps, pipe lines, ancillary buildings, receiving and despatching points and railway siding. The storage tanks were initially proposed at capacities of 550,000 and 910,000 litres (120,000 and 200,000 imp gal). For purposes of fire protection, the storage tanks were to be separated by a distance of at least 200' (61 m). The RAAF proposed camouflaging the fuel tanks in case of an air-borne attack. The tanks were to be placed in a 5-metre (17.5 ft) excavation, surrounded by a 2-metre (7.5 ft) bank to act as a compound to isolate and protect each individual tank in the event of a bomb attack and also permit camouflaging by covering the entire excavation with netting and camouflage material. The fuel depots were to be guarded by an army representative so a guard house was also proposed within each IAFD site to enable 24-hour security. Details for the construction of the original 12 IAFDs were approved by early 1941. The Department of Interior was commissioned to carry out the works. Two Australian petroleum companies were engaged to provide the working drawings. Shell Oil Company was responsible for lAFD No.3 at Cootamundra as well as numbers 4, 5, 6, 7, 8 and 9.

The site of the No.3 IAFD at Cootamundra was amalgamated from several lots acquired from the NSW State Government, from the Cootamundra Municipal Council and from private individuals. Also included was a council-owned public road and a private road. The site became the property of the Royal Australian Air Force and the Australian Army.

At Cootamundra the construction of the smaller aviation fuel tanks, numbers 1, 2 (with a storage capacity of 550,000 litres (120,000 imp gal) each) and the mixing tank number 3 (180,000 litres (40,000 imp gal)) was complete by late 1941. Then the Japanese attack on the United States' navy at Pearl Harbor on 7 December 1941 considerably escalated the threat of a Japanese attack on Australian soil. From early 1942 the number of inland fuel aviation depots was increased from 12 to 31 and in addition many were considerably expanded in their storage capacity. By early 1944 the aviation fuel depot at Cootamundra had two more, much larger capacity fuel tanks, numbers 4 and 5, each with a storage capacity of 1,360,000 litres (300,000 imp gal). These were also much more thoroughly camouflaged with an earthen embankment completely covering each of them. However neither of these two large tanks was ever actually used to store aviation fuel.

The threat of Japanese invasion rapidly abated during 1944 and the decision was made to close down Cootamundra No. 3 IAFD along with many of the other IAFD sites on the condition that they were to be kept intact and ready for use if necessary. Detailed instructions were provided to empty and clean the fuel storage tanks, remove pressure vacuum relief valves, close down all tank valves and other valves, remove hand wheels and place all the removed items in store. All pumps were to be drained, and bearings to be greased. Bright metal surfaces were required to be coated with rust preventive. Ethyl blenders' clothing was to be aired and replaced in lockers and sprayed with insecticides. Water mains were to be shut, and electric fuses removed. Fire hoses were to be dried and placed in store. The openings of bulk road vehicle filling points from where hoses had been removed were required to be capped or plugged. All these instructions ensured that all buildings were left clean, all equipment cleaned, greased and maintained in working condition and all safety precautions followed to ensure the re-use of the site or any building or equipment when the need arose. ln addition, de-gassing and de-leading of petrol storage tanks were also recommended.

Following the cessation of hostilities the Cootamundra airfield reverted to civilian use. The aerodrome remains in operation in 2014.

=== Former IAFD site since WWII ===
Following the end of the World War II, the need for bulk storage of fuel in safe locations inland ceased and the Inland Aircraft Fuel Depot sites were sold. The Commonwealth Disposals Commission, working on behalf of the Department of Air sold the No.3 IAFD site at Cootamundra to Australian Motorists Petrol Company Ltd (AMP, which later became Ampol) on 26 June 1947.

At the time of the sale, an inventory was made which described the site as including the land, fencing, gates, sand boxes, skidways, water supply and reticulation, drainage, five fuel tanks and 12 buildings. These 12 buildings included the guard house, tool shed, sentry box, foam house, drum filling platform, fuel pump house and hose exchange pit, fuel hose rack, fire hose boxes and Tetra Ethyl drum storage. The site continued to be used as a fuel storage depot after the war.

The depot site became the property of Caltex Australia in 1995 following the merger of Ampol and Caltex Australia and was officially closed at the end of that year. The site has been disused since then. The ownership of the site was to be transferred to Cootamundra Shire Council (now Cootamundra–Gundagai Regional Council) once all required land remediation works have been completed. Caltex Australia was renamed back to Ampol in May 2020.

=== Heritage of the site ===
A community heritage study jointly commissioned by Cootamundra Shire Council and Heritage Branch of the NSW Department of Planning in 2008 identified the former No.3 IAFD site as significant. The site has been listed as a heritage item in the Cootamundra heritage inventory of the Local Environmental Plan (LEP) of 2013. The inventory provides a brief description of the tanks.

A military "Aerodrome Study" undertaken in 2001 for the NSW Heritage Council identified Cootamundra as one of the "parent" aerodromes across the state which should be considered for state heritage listing. Cootamundra Council nominated the site for NSW State Heritage Register listing in mid-2014.

=== Comparative analysis - NSW inland fuel depots ===
Between the period of 1941 and 1944 a total of 31 Inland Aircraft Fuel Depots were established in all states of Australia of which 11 were located in NSW. Chris Imrie, Manager, Development Services at Cootamundra Council, undertook a desktop survey of the NSW former IAFDs to establish their condition in 2014. This established that out of the 11 sites in NSW, there is one other site like Cootamundra which was used as a fuel depot after World War II and has since been abandoned but remains largely intact (Tamworth). There are two sites that are probably largely intact but in use for grazing (Deniliquin and Goulburn). The location of two sites was not confirmed, so their current condition is unknown (Wallererang and Narromine). The other five sites have been substantially demolished or replaced (Grafton, Muswellbrook, Tocumwal, Wagga Wagga, Parkes):

- Cootamundra - 1942, 4,000-thousand-litre (880×10^{3} imp gal) capacity, complete intact. A few remnants of the rail siding are left but will be remediated and destroyed;
- Wallererang - 1942, 2,910-thousand-litre (640×10^{3} imp gal) capacity, location unconfirmed;
- Grafton - 1942, 1,270-thousand-litre (280×10^{3} imp gal) capacity, original infrastructure demolished under remediation;
- Muswellbrook - 1942, 1,270-thousand-litre (280×10^{3} imp gal) capacity, continuing use as fuel depot with original depot demolished and new infrastructure in place;
- Tocumwal - 1942, 8,390-thousand-litre (1,845×10^{3} imp gal) capacity (largest fuel depot in country), continuing use as fuel depot with original infrastructure demolished and replaced;
- Deniliquin - 1942, 1,610-thousand-litre (354×10^{3} imp gal) capacity, largely intact, land now used for grazing;
- Goulburn - 1942, 2,970-thousand-litre (654×10^{3} imp gal) capacity, largely intact, land now used for grazing, good example of camouflage (owner has turned it into a tourist attraction);
- Wagga Wagga - 1942, 5,700-thousand-litre (1,254×10^{3} imp gal) capacity, still in use as fuel storage but undergoing remediation so that recent structures to be demolished but WWII remaining underground storage tanks to remain intact;
- Parkes - 1942, 7,060-thousand-litre (1,554×10^{3} imp gal) capacity, was used as modern fuel depot but now being remediated with recent infrastructure being removed but original tanks to remain intact;
- Narromine - 1942, 2,970-thousand-litre (654×10^{3} imp gal) capacity, location not confirmed;
- Tamworth - 1942, 2,970-thousand-litre (654×10^{3} imp gal) capacity, was used as modern fuel depot but now abandoned, both original and recent infrastructure intact.

Of the Inland Aircraft Fuel Depots sites in NSW, Cootamundra was the earliest to be established. The layout site has remained largely intact and the fuel tanks appear to be unaltered. Some smaller structures including the Guard House, Sentry Box have been removed and an office added, but the fuel tanks, pump house, fencing and other infrastructure remain intact.

== Description ==
Cootamundra is located 380 kilometres (240 mi) from Sydney in the South West Slopes of western NSW's Riverina region, approximately 40 kilometres (25 mi) north of Gundagai and the Murrumbidgee River. Its railway station is located on the main railway line that links Sydney and Melbourne.

The Cootamundra World War II Fuel Depot Site is situated beside the Olympic Highway / Sutton Street at the southern end of the Cootamundra township, just north of Cootamundry Creek and the railway line. The aerodrome it serviced is on the northern side of the township and during World War II fuel was probably transported there by truck.

The SHR boundary of the site follows the existing cadastral allotment boundary (Lot 112 DP 136005, soon to become Lot 12 DP 85690), and encloses 4.4 hectares (11 acres) of land. The lot is enclosed by a barbed wire fence, much of which dates from World War II.

The site elements surviving from World War II include five large aviation fuel tanks, the foam house, fuel pump house and steel pipes criss-crossing the site. The five steel fuel storage tanks are the key elements and remain in fair condition. They consist of a single above-ground steel tank (no.1), two steel and brick-veneer above-ground tanks (nos 2 and 3) and two large concrete and steel tanks covered by earthen mounds (nos 4 and 5).

Features that have been removed include the original guard house, sentry box and tool shed. A rail siding platform on the other side of Sutton Street was a critical part of the design of the site, linking it to the railway between Sydney and Melbourne. Remnants of this rail siding are currently being demolished as part of the remediation of the site, and are not included in this SHR listing. Some of the pipework between the site and the rail siding will remain in place, for example, beside the bridge crossing the creek, and are considered significant but are not included in this listing curtilage.

Post war fuel infrastructure constructed by Ampol including above ground and underground tanks and buildings were located at the southern end of the site near Sutton Street. These are currently being demolished as part of remediation works in preparation for transferring the site to Cootamundra Council. None of the post-war structures are considered significant to this listing.

=== Five fuel tanks ===
Summaries of the detailed descriptions of the fuel tanks contained in the 1946 Handover-Takeover certificate provided by the Commonwealth Government when transferring the site to AMPOL, as reported in Paul Rappoport's CMP for the site commissioned by Caltex in 2011, are given below.

Fuel Tank No.1

The capacity of fuel tank No.1 is 545,531 litres (120,000 imp gal). It measures 9 metres (30 ft) in diameter and is 9 metres (29 ft 4 in) tall; although this figure may be incorrect as the tank appears to be taller than it is wide. The tank is constructed of welded steel plate with a cork lagged cone roof and is seated on a sand-filled concrete circular foundation. It is further surrounded by a high earthen embankment, which was likely designed to contain leaks but from which rain water could be drained via a 15-centimetre (6 in) drain pipe. The steel tank appears to be complete, in a good condition and without any damage to its external surface.

Fuel Tank No.2

The capacity of fuel tank No.2 is 545,531 litres (120,000 imp gal). The tank measures 9 metres (30 ft) diameter and is 9 metres (29 ft 4 in) in height; again, the height figure appears questionable, especially when compared against the 1941 photo of Tank 2 being installed, Image no.X. The tank is constructed of welded mild steel plate with cork lagged cone roof, positioned on a foundation of sand filled concrete. The tank is encased in brick work, on which the name "Ampol" has been painted. The valves and manholes around the base of the tank are protected by brick housing. The tank is seated in an excavated compound with earth banked up to a height of 1 metre (4 ft) on its lower side, which was likely designed to contain leaks but from which rain water could be drained via a 15-centimetre (6 in) drain pipe. There is a steel stairway to the top of the tank consisting of two straight sections 19' (5.79 m) long and 2' (61 cm) wide with handrails and landing with handrails. The brick enclosure of the tank appeared to be in a good condition. It is unclear if the steel tank within the brick casing is in a good condition.

Fuel Tank No.3

The fuel tank No.3 was designed with a capacity of 181,844 litres (40,000 imp gal) This tank served as the mixing tank. The tank has a diameter of 6 metres (20 ft) and a height of 7 metres (24 ft 4 in), and is constructed of welded mild steel plate with cork lagged cone roof on a circular foundation of a sand filled concrete. The tank is encased in brick-work, on which the word "Ampol" has been painted. The tank is seated in an excavated compound with earth banked up around it, which was likely designed to contain leaks but from which rain water could be drained via a 15-centimetre (6 in) drain pipe. A steel stairway is installed to the top of the tank. The brick enclosure of the tank appears to be in a good condition. It is unclear if the steel tank within the brick casing is in a good condition.

Fuel Tanks No.4 and No.5

The Fuel Tanks No.4 and No.5 were built in a second stage of construction of the No.3 Inland Aircraft Fuel Depot at Cootamundra following the Japanese attack on Pearl Harbor on 7 December 1941. Completed by 1944, the two tanks were identical in their specifications and have a capacity of 1,363,827 litres (300,000 imp gal) each. They were both installed well into the ground and were camouflaged by the construction of an earthen mound 76-centimetre (2.5 ft) thick over each one. They measure 18 metres (58 ft) in diameter and 6 metres (19.5 ft) in height. The tanks are of concrete construction lined with 1-centimetre (0.25 in) mild steel plate. Each tank has a concrete tunnel approach constructed of 15-centimetre (6 in) reinforced concrete which is 7 metres (24 ft) long, 21 metres (68 ft) high and 1 metre (4 ft) wide. They were both fitted with extensive water pipes and foam pipes.

=== Other associated built elements ===
Fuel Pump House

This includes the Fuel Pump House and the hose exchange pit. The Fuel Pump House is a small brick structure measuring 4 by 2 metres (12 ft × 8 ft). The walls are made of brick and it has a C.A.S. roof on hardwood frame and concrete floor. The Ethyl Blending Pit measured 4 by 4 metres (12 ft × 12 ft). The walls had 5 centimetres (2 in) mesh chain wire on hardwood frame with fibrolite spouting and down pipe. The floor was made of concrete. There was also a Hose Exchange pit which measured 4 by 4 by 1 metre (12 ft × 12 ft × 3 ft) of 15 centimetres (6 in) concrete with 5 by 5 metres (18 ft × 18 ft) C.A.S. skillion roof on hardwood frame and P.G.I spouting and down pipe. This formed an annexe to the pump house.

Foam House

The Foam House measures 10 by 6 metres (32 ft × 20 ft). The walls are of double brick and concrete filled. The walls are 33 centimetres (13 in) thick. One section of the foam house measuring 6 by 3 metres (20 ft × 10 ft) comprises the pump house with concrete floor and roof. This section was provided with night latch and sliding 10-by-10-centimetre (4 in × 4 in) glass peep windows. A 45,461-litre (10,000 imp gal) rectangular water tank, 6 by 4 by 2 metres (18.75 ft × 14.7 ft × 6 ft), was provided for water supply to the foam plant. This was connected to water supply by 3-centimetre (1 in) pipe and ball cock. Foam was directed to a manifold located on the wall of the generator plant and thence to various tanks and hydrants by means of lever operated quick action valves.

Ethyl Drum Storage

The drum storage has probably been replaced with another structure.

Filling Platform and Shed

A Drum Filling Platform 17 by 6 metres (55 ft × 20 ft) and a Drum Filling Shed 6 by 4 metres (20 ft × 12 ft) were present at the handover in 1946 but have since been replaced.

Other elements associated with the site include:

- Pipelines: Lengths of pipeline are found throughout the site.
- Fire Hose Locations: Five fire hose boxes are noted in the early site plan of 1946. Some can still be found at various parts of the site, however, these are not the original boxes which were of timber construction. The metal boxes present on the site, which probably replaced the original timber boxes, are now empty. They are in a fair condition.
- Bulk Road Vehicle filling points: Bulk road vehicle filling points were marked on the 1946 site plan. The remains of the equipment are in a completely ruined condition. The concrete base on the ground appears to be in a fairly intact.
- Railway siding (off site in nearby Lot 7019 DP 1075146): A railway siding was constructed to service the Inland Aircraft Fuel Depots No.3 Site with rail tank car filling points. Rappoport's CMP described it as "an integral part of the Inland Aircraft Fuel Depots site as it was where rail tankers were filled with fuel from the site. The rail siding platform 51 centimetres (20 in) by 5 metres (15 ft) had 1 metre (4 ft) by 13 centimetres (5 in) hardwood posts set in concrete, to a total length of 34 metres (112 ft). Stays, bearers, decking, buffer beam and bolts were provided to complete the structure'. Located on the other side of the railway line, about 100 metres (330 ft) south west of the entrance gate on Sutton Street, the rail siding site in 2014 retained few remnants of the original structure – some pipework, concrete drainage, sump and railway sleepers. This site has been assessed as being heavily contaminated and it is undergoing remediation which will remove all remaining remnants. Some photographic recording of the remains of the site has been undertaken.

The following 1940s fuel infrastructure has also been removed from the site:

- One 60kL heating oil AST on concrete slab (labelled as T8);
- One suspected former AST (contents unknown; labelled as T9); and
- One 55 – 80kL diesel AST on concrete slab (labelled as T11).

Fuel storage infrastructure constructed by Ampol in the post-war period near Sutton Street if not considered significant and is being removed from the site as part of the remediation works.

=== Condition ===
As at 15 September 2014, the site has been disused since 1995 when Caltex closed it down. The key original elements built during World War II - notably the fuel tanks - remain intact and in fair to good condition. Remediation and de-contamination is being carried out on the site before it is transferred to Cootamundra Council.

The layout of the site remains largely unchanged and the remnants of the fuel tanks, Fuel Pump House, Foam House and associated pipework appear unaltered. In 2011 the brick work surrounding the fuel tanks, foam house and pump house appeared to be well constructed and intact. The features that have been removed include the original Guard House, Sentry Box and Tool Shed.

=== Modifications and dates ===
Post war additions to the site such as underground petroleum storage tanks, tool shed, drum storage shed and platform as well as any asbestos materials have been removed in June 2013 during land remediation works carried out by Caltex Australia prior to disposal. Soil contamination remediation work undertaken in 2014. Demolitions and remediation works have been undertaken and approved under Council Development Consent DA13-047.

== Heritage listing ==
As at 13 November 2014, Cootamundra's World War II Fuel Depot Site (former No. 3 Aviation Inland Fuel Depot or No.3 AIFD) is of state significance as a representative mid-twentieth century industrial site and an intact remnant of an Australia-wide network of World War II technical infrastructure. Because of its strategic location on the railway line nearly mid-way between Sydney and Melbourne, Cootamundra became the first of 11 "safe inland locations" in NSW chosen for the bulk storage of aviation fuel during World War II. The war-time construction and functioning of the Cootamundra No.3 IAFD in stocking and distributing aviation fuel to the Cootamundra aerodrome and no.1 Air Observer's School is a minor but integral aspect of the defence history of New South Wales and Australia. The site with its five fuel tanks, the Fuel Pump House, the Foam House, pipelines and fencing was used for its intended purpose only for a short period in 1942 but then was acquired by Ampol after the war and put into in commercial use by oil companies until 1995. The site is likely to have state research potential for maintaining an intact layout and structures that have been minimally modified. The built structures retain most of their original fabric and have the potential to improve our understanding of the technical knowledge and factors involved in the mid-twentieth century storage of aviation fuel as well as issues associated with the long-term use and conservation of such structures.

Cootamundra World War II Fuel Depot was listed on the New South Wales State Heritage Register on 27 February 2015 having satisfied the following criteria.

The place is important in demonstrating the course, or pattern, of cultural or natural history in New South Wales.

Cootamundra's World War II Fuel Depot Site is of state historical significance as the first of 11 sites in NSW to be chosen for the bulk storage of aviation fuel during World War II, a substantial and rare, intact remnant of this genre of the national network of defence infrastructure. The war-time construction and functioning of the site in stocking and distributing aviation fuel to the Cootamundra aerodrome and no.1 Air Observer's School is a minor but integral aspect of the defence history of New South Wales and Australia. The site remains an example of the positive result of effective wartime decision-making, where the fuel tanks and other structures were conceptualized, designed and installed within a very short span of time. Also of historical interest is the evidence of consideration about the safety of personnel working in the depot during the war and safety measures undertaken at the time of de-commissioning the remediation of the structures in 1947. The site was used for its intended purpose only for a short period in 1942 but then was acquired by AMPOL after the war and continued in commercial oil company use until 1995.

The place has a strong or special association with a person, or group of persons, of importance of cultural or natural history of New South Wales's history.

Cootamundra's WWII aviation fuel depot (No.3 IAFD) site has local level historical associations with personnel in the RAAF and oil companies who designed the fuel depots and worked out strategies for camouflaging them, and with the service people who staffed the site while it was in operation. Amongst the many military personnel stationed at the Cootamundra Aerodrome during the Second World War was a young Gough Whitlam, who would become Prime Minister of Australia (1972–1975). Whitlam undertook three months of extensive navigation training with the No.1 Air Observers School while posted to the Cootamundra RAAF base in 1942.

The place is important in demonstrating aesthetic characteristics and/or a high degree of creative or technical achievement in New South Wales.

Many issues were resolved in the development of standard typologies for the safe storage of aviation fuel by the Australian Government's Aviation Fuel Committee during World War II. Cootamundra's WWII aviation fuel depot (No.3 IAFD) exemplifies this technical achievement in the location of the site within the state and on the edge of the township, in the carefully designed fuel tanks, their well-constructed earth and brick casings and in the strategies for camouflaging the site. The fuel pump house and foam house are also well-designed, functional structures. The site's presence in the Cootamundra town-scape is strongly felt due to its prominent appearance on the edge of town and has local landmark qualities.

The place has a strong or special association with a particular community or cultural group in New South Wales for social, cultural or spiritual reasons.

Cootamundra's WWII Fuel Depot Site is likely to have local level significance for communities of people interested in World War II infrastructure and especially those people who worked for the RAAF, Shell Oil Company, Department of Air, Department of Works and Buildings, Railways, Ampol and Caltex.

The place has potential to yield information that will contribute to an understanding of the cultural or natural history of New South Wales.

Cootamundra's World War II Fuel Depot Site has state research potential for maintaining an intact layout and structures that have been minimally modified. The structures retain much of their original fabric and have the potential to improve our understanding of the technical knowledge and factors involved in the mid-twentieth century storage of aviation fuel as well as issues associated with the long-term use and conservation of such structures.

The place possesses uncommon, rare or endangered aspects of the cultural or natural history of New South Wales.

Cootamundra's World War II Fuel Depot Site is of state significance as one of the most intact of the 31 IAFD sites commissioned throughout Australia in the early 1940s to provide a widespread network of war-time reserves of aviation fuel. It was the first of eleven Inland Aircraft Fuel Depot sites commissioned in NSW.

The place is important in demonstrating the principal characteristics of a class of cultural or natural places/environments in New South Wales.

Cootamundra's World War II Fuel Depot Site has state significance as representative mid-twentieth century industrial site, an intact group of structures built to stock and distribute aviation fuel and oil by the Australian military in 1942. The structures followed a standard typology that facilitated their quick installations within a short period of time during World War II. The site's subsequent history of long-term adaptive civilian re-use is also representative of the history of much World War II infrastructure.

== See also ==
- List of RAAF inland aircraft fuel depots
