= Cootamundra Jazz Band =

Australian jazz band

The Cootamundra Jazz Band, based in the New South Wales town of Cootamundra, was one of Australia's foremost traditional jazz bands of the 1950s, and the fore-runner of the Riverina Jazz Band based in nearby Wagga Wagga.

== History ==
The Cootamundra Jazz Band had its beginnings in 1947 when John Ansell moved into the town and formed a trio with Eric Costelloe on trumpet and John Costelloe on drums, later trombone, with Don Le Soeur on drums, and as "The Modernists" played at dances and functions. Influenced by recordings of Graeme Bell's band, they turned to New Orleans Dixieland style traditional jazz, and in 1951 adopted the name "Cootamundra Jazz Band" (in 1954 John Costelloe would join Bell's band for a tour of Korea and Japan). Lloyd Jansson (later bandmaster for the Ballina Shire Concert Band) replaced Eric on trumpet and Jack Malone joined on tuba. In 1952 Greg Gibson arrived from Melbourne and joined on clarinet and Kevin McArthur took over as drummer. In 1952 in Leeton they played at the Jazz Convention to popular acclaim, and gained further notice in Hobart in 1953 then 1954 in Sydney and in 1955 when the Convention was held at "Coota". Malone retired in 1956 and the band gained a bassist in Bob Cowle. Laurie Gooding replaced Gibson on clarinet around 1960. The group disbanded when Ansell moved to Wagga Wagga in 1960 and (with wife Shirley Ansell on piano, John Costelloe on trombone, David Kennedy on saxes and clarinet, Graeme Callander on tuba and George Ceeley on drums) founded the Riverina Jazz Band, still going strong in 1995 with virtually the same lineup.

The band made two albums: a critically acclaimed self titled 10" LP which was Volume 6 in the collection Jazz in Australia for Parlophone, and Country Barn Dance for Columbia – 33-OSX-7620 (1963). The latter was re-released on compact cassette with additional tracks by the Riverina Jazz Band, and later again on compact disc.

McArthur later founded The Music Men with Peter Brown on reeds, Pat O'Halloran on guitar and Mike McCall on fretless bass, all having played with the Riverina Jazz Band.
