= Digby Blight =

Australian civil servant

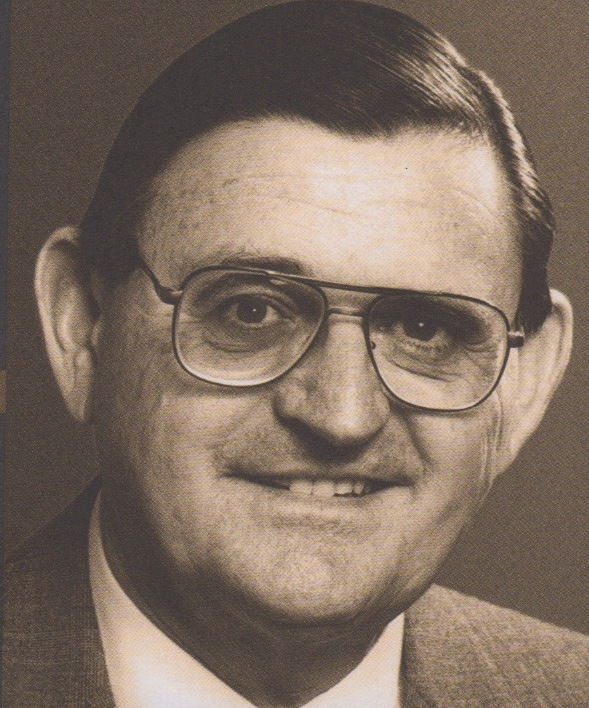
Digby Blight as Director General

Digby Graham Blight OA FIPAA (born 19 September 1931) is an Australian retired Director General of the Western Australian Department of Premier and Cabinet, Co-ordinator of the Group Migration Scheme and current benefactor to charities and community programs, most notably the JDRF, (Juvenile Diabetes Research Foundation).

Blight was made a Fellow of the Institute of Public Administration Australia in 1983 and an Officer of the Order of Australia in 1999, "For service to public sector management in Western Australia, particularly with the ministry of the premier and cabinet and the public sector standards commission, and to the community through the Diabetes Assoc of WA"

== Early life and education ==
Blight was born in Merredin, in the central eastern wheatbelt of Western Australia, 300 kilometres (190 mi) east of Perth. In 1937, he and his brother moved to Perth to live with their Aunt and Uncle in Midland, where they went to school at Midland Primary. After finishing school in 1946, Digby went to Trade School. He soon became interested in technical drawing rather than Trade School and applied for a draughtsman cadetship in the public service. Twelve months too young to undertake the cadetship, he started working as a trainee junior clerk in the Forests Department until he was old enough to enter the cadet program. However, upon applying for the cadetship Blight did not meet the strict medical requirements and continued at the Forests Department, working on Timber Workers’ Registration Certificates

Looking to proceed beyond the base grade level of the Public Service, Blight attended night school at the Perth Technical College and completed a Diploma in Public Administration. Blight later completed an Accountancy Diploma.

== Professional career ==
To utilise his degree, Blight left the Forests Department in 1956 after being asked to go into the Public Service Commissioner’s Office to fill the position of Secretary of the Promotions Appeal Board and Secretary of the Public Service Appeal Board.

Blight spent two and a half years in London coordinating the Group Migration Scheme. This involved interviewing potential trade persons for immigration to Western Australia. Returning to Perth and the Public Service Appeal Board, Blight obtained several more promotions working his way to become Assistant Commissioner of the Public Service Board.

The change of Government in 1983 saw Blight working on the coordination of the Ministry of the Premier and Cabinet. Digby was appointed as Deputy Director to Bruce Beggs, moving twelve months later into the position of Director. Blight was offered preselection by two major political parties, Labor and Liberals, at the Federal level with early opportunity to join the front bench. He firmly believed that his place was in the public sector, his fifty years in the public service moulding him as independent.

After 10 years in the position of Director, Blight was looking towards retirement but was convinced by Premier Richard Court to take up the position of the Public Sector Standards Commissioner. After 50 years in the public service, Blight acknowledges the opportunities and promotions available to him in the public service saying that he had risen, professionally, a lot higher than he ever imagined he would.

Blight was offered the role of Governor General but his partner, Kathleen, insisted that Canberra's climate is "too cold".

He was made an Officer of the Order of Australia in 1999, a high honour in Australia.

In 2012, Blight was honoured as the meeting room of the Public Sector Commission's new building was named after him. He also appeared in, In Honour, Distinguished members of the Public Service Commission 1905-1994. Public Sector Commission. October 2013.
