= Smacka Fitzgibbon =

Graham Francis "Smacka" Fitzgibbon (12 February 1930 – 15 December 1979) was an Australian banjoist and vocalist in the trad jazz idiom. He was a publican in country Victoria and restaurateur in Melbourne.

== Biography ==
=== Early life ===
Fitzgibbon was born at Mordialloc, Victoria, the son of Francis Michael Thomas "Frank" Fitzgibbon, clerk, and pianist Minnie "Momma" Fitzgibbon, née Mitchell (died 1989), and nicknamed "Smacka" by Roy Youlden, a bookmaker friend of his father. The actress–singer Maggie Fitzgibbon (30 January 1929 – 8 June 2020) was a sister.

Educated at St Bede's College, he began playing ukulele at an early age before switching to the banjo; his earliest influences were Bing Crosby, Al Bowlly and Louis Armstrong.

=== Career ===
In 1951 he began playing with "Frank Johnson’s Fabulous Dixielanders", before forming his own band, "The Steamboat Stompers"; his first album was Frisco Joe's Good Time Boys (1953). His party records on the Melbourne "Paramount" label sold well.

He started working at age 14 as a mechanic, then gained hotel-keeping experience in country Victoria as an employee of the Darnum Hotel. With help from his parents, he became licensee of the Commercial Hotel, Warragul, then after the death of his father, Smacka and his mother took over the Royal Mail Hotel, Wycheproof, In 1967 he opened Melbourne's first jazz restaurant "La Brochette" (Studley Park Road, Kew) and in May 1971 "Smacka's Place", 55 Chetwynd Street, North Melbourne which became a Melbourne institution; his recipe for an enjoyable night out was an ample supply of "good food, good liquor, and good entertainment". Described as "Plump and smiling with a warm and friendly, genial personality", Smacka was a much loved entertainer, a rare breed who left a smile on everyone's face. He was a regular performer on Melbourne television shows, notably Sunnyside Up, In Melbourne Tonight and The Penthouse Club.

In 1972, the jovial Australian jazzman recorded the title song of the movie The Adventures of Barry McKenzie which was released as a single that same year, reaching #22 on Go-Set's Australian Singles Chart in December 1972. He was a mate of Australian satirist Barry Humphries.

Fitzgibbon recorded for the Fable label, and in 1972 was part of the Fable Singers' recording session, which recorded the theme songs for the 12 then-VFL clubs recorded under the musical direction of HSV-7's Ivan Hutchinson, with Smacka on vocals and banjo alongside other Australian jazz musicians including Frank Traynor on trombone. Most of these recordings are still played at AFL matches today. In 1976 he made recordings with "the father of Australian jazz", Graeme Bell, with Kenny Clayton's trio, and with "Momma" Fitzgibbon. That same year he took part in the Moomba Festival with Brian May's ABC Showband, on the CUB showboat. In October 1979 he was one of the featured artists at the opening of The Jam Factory shopping and arts complex.

== Death ==
Fitzgibbon was a chronic sufferer from melanoma, and had a malignant tumour removed in 1955. On 1 September 1977 Smacka collapsed during a radio broadcast on 3LO; he was subsequently found to have a brain tumour, for which he twice underwent surgery. He died from a cerebral haemorrhage on 15 December 1979, aged 49. Several thousand attended a rather colourful funeral service - "Mass for Smacka" - with Frank Traynor's "Jazz Preachers" playing the New Orleans hymn "Oh, Didn't He Ramble" for the funeral march in honour of the man described "as Melbourne as the Yarra (river)".

On 8 November 2004, a tribute show "Remembering Smacka" was performed by his daughter Nichaud at the Arts Centre Melbourne, in honour of the man best remembered for his popular jazz club, his dapper dress code (spotted bow ties, striped jackets, checked pants and two-tone shoes) and his love of vintage cars — he collected Packards.

== Legacy ==
The Victorian Jazz Archive featured Smacka in its "Fitzgibbon Dynasty" exhibition.

== Family ==
Fitzgibbon married Faye Hommelhoff on 31 October 1959, with whom he had four children. Their daughter Nichaud Fitzgibbon is a noted jazz vocalist. Their sons, Mark and Andrew, are also both musicians.
