= Graeme Bell =

Australian jazz pianist, composer and band leader (1914–2012)

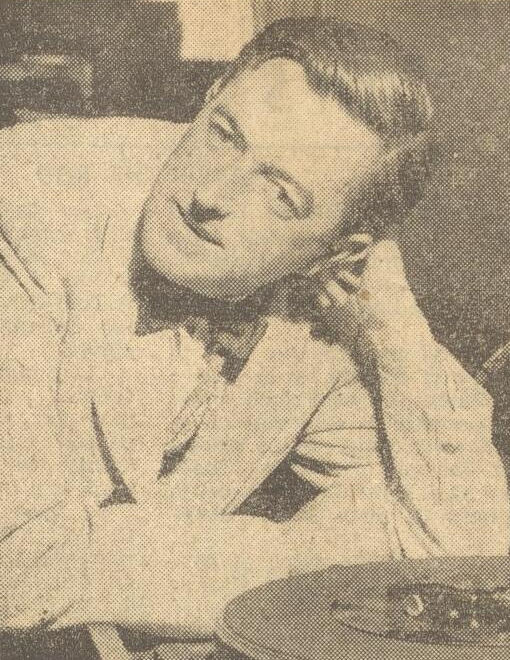
- Bell in 1952

Background information
- Born: 7 September 1914; Richmond, Victoria, Australia
- Died: 13 June 2012 (aged 97) Sydney, New South Wales, Australia
- Genres: Jazz; dixieland
- Occupations: Musician; composer; band leader
- Instrument: Piano
- Years active: 1935–2008
- Labels: Ampersand; Supraphon; Regal Zonophone; EMI; Angel; Festival; Jazzology; Swaggie; Newmarket
- Spouse: Elizabeth Galloway Bell (m. 1946; div. 1961)

Graeme Emerson Bell, AO, MBE (7 September 1914 – 13 June 2012) was an Australian Dixieland and classical jazz pianist, composer and band leader. According to The Age, his "band's music was hailed for its distinctive Australian edge, which he describes as 'nice larrikinism' and 'a happy Aussie outdoor feel'".

Bell was one of the leading promoters of jazz in Australia, bringing American performers such as Rex Stewart to Australia. He was the first Australian jazz band leader who was still playing at 90 years of age and the first Westerner to lead a jazz band to China. The American music journal DownBeat said: "Bell's is unquestionably the greatest jazz band outside America". The Australian Jazz Awards commenced in 2003. They are also known as The Bells in his honour.

== Early life ==
Bell was born in 1914 in Richmond, Victoria, Australia, to John Alexander Bell, who had performed musical comedy and music hall on the early Australian Broadcasting Commission (ABC) radio, and Mary Elvina "Elva" (née Rogers) Bell, who had been a contralto recitalist in Dame Nellie Melba's company. His younger brother, Roger Bell (1919–2008), was also a jazz musician.

From the age of 12, Bell had weekly piano lessons in classical music by Jesse Stewart Young, a contemporary of his mother. His parents paid for the piano lessons for the first four years. He attended Scotch College in 1929 and 1930, where he enjoyed playing cricket and creating contemporary art including sketches for the Scotch Collegian. He left school at age 16 during the Great Depression and worked for T & G Insurance as a clerk for over nine years, and had a stint as a farm hand. He paid for his own piano lessons for two further years, and in later years he supplemented his income by teaching.

Bell was converted to jazz by Roger, a drummer, later a singer and trumpeter. Roger would play 78s on the family's record player, including Fats Waller's "Handful of Keys". Bell started playing jazz in 1935 with Roger at Melbourne dances and clubs. One of his earliest gigs was at the Portsea Hotel. While performing at Portsea, he met Margot Byass. They were married for several years. Bell later said "we were victims of the war".

By 1941 he fronted his own Graeme Bell Jazz Gang. During World War II, Bell was declared unfit for active service, so he entertained Australian troops, including travelling to Mackay, Queensland in early 1943. After his return to Melbourne, Bell became a full-time professional with the Dixieland Jazz Band, which included Roger Bell, Geoff Kitchen, Adrian "Lazy Ade" Monsbourgh on trumpet, Don "Pixie" Roberts on clarinet, Lou "Baron" Silbereisen and Russ Murphy. Bell's first recordings were for William Miller's Ampersand label in 1943. In 1946, he married Elizabeth Watson (1911–2007). Their marriage lasted until 1961. Their daughter Christina was born during the band's first overseas tour.

== Career ==
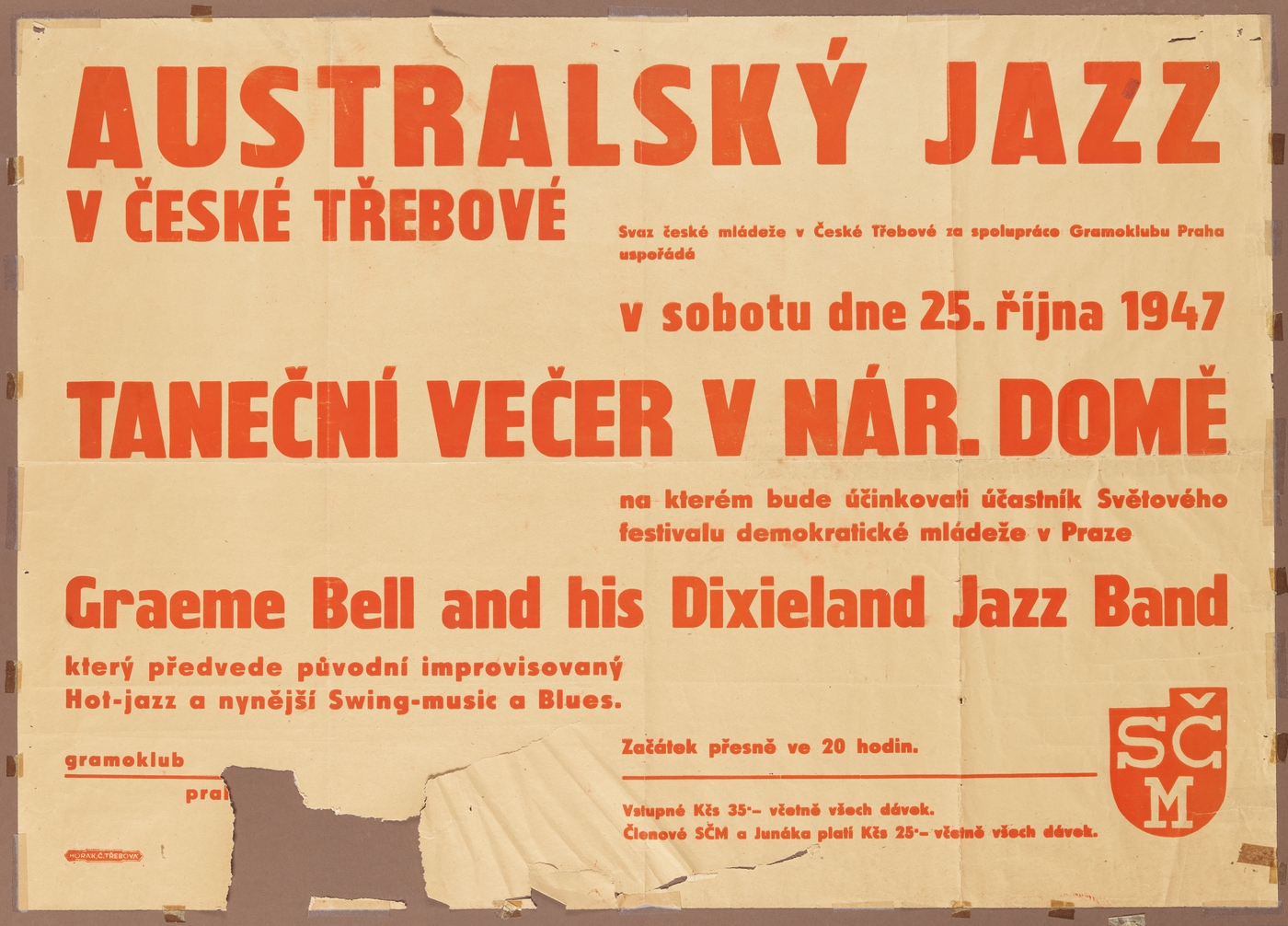
A poster for the 1947 performance of Graeme Bell and his Dixieland Jazz Band at the World Democratic Youth Festival

Bell became leader of the house band for the Eureka Youth League (formerly the Communist Youth League) and established a cabaret, the Uptown Club, in 1946. After playing at the inaugural Australian Jazz Convention in December, Bell's band was renamed Australian Jazz Band and became the first such band to tour Europe. Australian Jazz Band members were initially, Bell on piano, Roger Bell on cornet and vocal, Monsbourgh on valve trombone, clarinet and vocal, Roberts on clarinet, Silbereisen on bass and tuba, with Charlie Blott, Ian Pearce and Jack Varney on banjo and guitar. With sponsorship from communist Harry Stein's Eureka Youth League, they toured Czechoslovakia for four and a half months in 1947, including playing at the World Youth Festival in Prague. "The Lizard", an improvisation recorded in the studio for Regal Zonophone Records in June, was Bell's first composition. Another early recording was his composition, "Czechoslovak Journey", which was started in his studio in Bourke Street, Melbourne and recorded together with 14 other tracks for Czechoslovak Journey by Supraphon in Prague on 23 September and 13 November 1947 and released in 1981 on LP.

Australian Jazz Band travelled to the United Kingdom in early 1948 and Bell started the Leicester Square Jazz Club, playing music specifically for dancing, which continued into the 1950s. They played songs outside the standard jazz repertoire and, with their encouragement of dancing, caused concern to local jazz enthusiasts, but were popular with patrons. According to The Age, his "band's music was hailed for its distinctive Australian edge", which he describes as "nice larrikinism" and "a happy Aussie outdoor feel". The Cootamundra Jazz Band was one of many to be influenced by Bell's music.

During the early 1950s Bell periodically returned to UK and Europe from Melbourne to perform, a later line-up of Australian Jazz Band was Roger Bell (trumpet), Kitchen, Ade Monsbourgh (trumpet & alto), Pixie Roberts (clarinet), Baron Silvereisen (Bass & Tuba) with Norman "Bud" Baker (Guitar & Banjo), Deryck "Kanga" Bentley (Trombone) and Johnny Sangster (drums and cornet). On 1 May 1951 they appeared at Oxford Town Hall. On 15 September 1951, this line-up recorded a concert with Big Bill Broonzy at the Robert Schumann Saal in Düsseldorf, Germany; which was later released as Big Bill Broonzy in Concert with Graeme Bell & his Australian Jazz Band. Whilst touring through Germany, Bell encountered ardent fans:

in the band bus, girls, German girls would hide in the band bus behind the seats, and when the band would take off, in the middle of the snow, on these long journeys, they'd reveal themselves [...] some of them would wear wedding rings so that they could get into the hotels with the members of the band and pose as their wives, and they'd purposely speak bad German.

— Graeme Bell, 21 August 2006

After returning to Australia for another national tour Bell met Dorothy Gough in Brisbane in 1955 and she convinced him to relocate to Sydney in 1957. Aside from playing, Bell was one of the leading promoters of jazz in Australia, bringing American performers such as trumpet player, Rex Stewart to Australia. There was some opposition from the Australian Musicians Union to foreign artists joining Australian bands, so Stewart had to play standing a metre (3 ft) in front of them to be classified as a soloist.

After relocating to Sydney, Bell played commercial music and taught piano to supplement his income. Bell and Dorothy married in 1961. In the 1960s, a trad jazz boom in UK encouraged Bell to form the Graeme Bell All Stars and tour there. This band included, Monsbourgh on clarinet, trombone, alto saxophone and second trumpet, and Bob Barnard on trumpet. Bell recalled his approach with the band:

I inherited some of my parents' showbusiness ability to operate from the stage, talk to the audience [...] that was the creative period of my life, really. And I learnt how to try and get the best out of musicians to produce a band and produce a sound. My own piano playing became quite secondary to the whole thing.

— Graeme Bell, 21 August 2006

After researching for five years, Bell wrote Graeme Bell, Australian jazzman in 1988. It contains a discography compiled by Jack Mitchell. Bell was inducted into the Australian Recording Industry Association (ARIA) Hall of Fame in 1997 with The Bee Gees and Paul Kelly. By 1999, Bell had made over 1,500 recordings and performed in thousands of gigs in Australia and internationally.

== Personal life ==
Graeme Bell's younger brother, Roger Bell (1919–2008) was also a jazz musician; Roger is credited with influencing Bell to convert from classical music to jazz; they often performed, toured and recorded together.

Bell married three times; his first marriage was in c. 1943 for about a year to Margot Byass, Bell later saying "we were victims of the war". His second marriage was to Elizabeth Watson in 1946, lasting until 1961, and his third marriage was to Dorothy Gough from 1961.

Bell died on 13 June 2012 after a stroke, aged 97.

== Discography ==
=== Albums ===
- Top of the Town – 1950 (EMI)
- Cakewalkin' Babies Back Home – 1951 (EMI)
- Inside Jazz Down Under – 1954 (Angel)
- Jazz Series I – 1961 (Zyp) This was a 2 EP release which was free from Zyp Softdrinks.
- Jazz Series II – 1962 (Zyp) This was a 2 EP release which was free from Zyp Softdrinks.
- Down Town with Graeme Bell – 1974 (Festival)
- Graeme Bell All-Stars – 1980 (Jazzology)
- Czechoslovak Journey – 1983 (Swaggie)
- Paris 1948 – 1983 (Swaggie)

== Honours and awards ==
Bell was made a Member of the Order of the British Empire (MBE) on 1 January 1978 for "valuable service to jazz music" and an Officer of the Order of Australia on 11 June 1990 for "service to music, particularly jazz".

The Australian Jazz Awards, or "The Bells", which commenced in 2003, are named in his honour. At the inaugural ceremony on 28 August, Bell inducted his former band member from 60 years earlier, Ade Monsbourgh, into the Graeme Bell Hall of Fame.

=== ARIA Music Awards ===
The ARIA Music Awards is an annual awards ceremony that recognises excellence, innovation, and achievement across all genres of Australian music. They commenced in 1987. Bell was inducted into the Hall of Fame in 1997.

Year	Nominee / work	Award	Result
1997	Graeme Bell	ARIA Hall of Fame	inductee

=== Helpmann Awards ===
The Helpmann Awards is an awards show, celebrating live entertainment and performing arts in Australia, presented by industry group Live Performance Australia (LPA) since 2001. In 2006, Bell received the JC Williamson Award, the LPA's highest honour, for their life's work in live performance.

Year	Nominee / work	Award	Result
2006	Himself	JC Williamson Award	awarded

== Bibliography ==
- Bell, Graeme; discography by Jack Mitchell (1988). Graeme Bell, Australian jazzman : his autobiography. Frenchs Forest, New South Wales: Child & Associates. ISBN 0-86777-171-2.
