= List of Australian Performing Arts Collection exhibitions =

List of exhibitions from the Australian Performing Arts Collection

This is a list of exhibitions held by the Australian Performing Arts Collection at the Arts Centre Melbourne, Melbourne, Victoria, organised chronologically and grouped by decade until 2017. Since 2017, the Australian Music Vault has housed a permanent exhibition utilising the APAC collection. The collections on display are rotated regularly. Previous exhibitions have toured nationally and internationally, while other collections are occasionally loaned.

== 1980s ==
Year	Exhibition Dates	Exhibition Title	Exhibition Summary	Exhibition Curator	Exhibition Catalogue	Press/Reviews/Notes
1981	4 Mar-19 Apr	Manipulating Reality: The Mask and Puppet as Theatre		Nina Stanton	OCLC 935604965.	First major exhibition of Performing Arts Collection, then known as Performing Arts Museum (PAM). Held at National Gallery of Victoria.
1982	? Jun-23 Jan	They Call Me Melba	Celebrating Nellie Melba	Nina Stanton	"The Legend Still Lives" ISBN 0-7241-3711-4.	Opening exhibition of PAM. Two costumes were lent to Metropolitan Opera in New York in 1983.
1982	? Oct-?	Penny Plain, Tuppence Coloured				
1982	27 Oct	Fleshtights and Footlights: Costume Design from the Golden Age of Pantomime.				
1983	26 Feb-? Nov	Bourke Street on Saturday Night		Frank Van Straten		Opened by Daryl Somers. Designed by Shaun Gurton.
1983	1 Oct-?	Diversions				
1983	27 Oct-11 Dec	The Fashion Diary of a Victorian Housewife - Dame Edna's Wardrobe 1956-1983	Featuring costumes from Dame Edna Everage			Ran for seven weeks.
1983	19 Dec-12 Feb	Beat! Australian Pop and Rock Culture		Janine Barrand		Featured displays dedicated to Split Enz and Skyhooks (band). Poster designed by Bloody Good Grafix.
1984	18 Feb-?	Meet You At Allans				
1984	18 Feb-?	Just Across Princes Bridge				
1984	20 Feb-29 Apr	Don Quixote: The Creation of a Ballet		Karen Reichelt	OCLC 221492980.	Designed by Laurie Carew.
1984	10 Apr-?	A Track Winding Back... A Jack O'Hagan Tribute				
1984	7 May-15 Jul	Magic! An Exhibition		Frank Van Straten and Janine Barrand		
1984	30 May-?	Crass Art: Contemporary British Punk Graphics				
1984	16 Jul-?	The Fabulous Phonograph of Thomas Rome				Held in the Concert Hall. Featuring a 90 year old Edison phonograph.
1984	16 Jul-26 Aug	Harry Jay - Seeing Stars	Contains photographs by Harry Jay			Held in the Concert Hall.
1984	23 Jul-30 Sep	Her Majesty's: A 50th Birthday Celebration		Frank Van Straten		
1984	8 Oct-9 Dec	Pin-Up		Frank Van Straten		Held in the Concert Hall.
1984	20 Oct-?	The Glory of Chinese Opera				
1984	22 Oct-?	Ashton's: The Spirit of the Circus				
1984	17 Dec-24 Feb	Horror! A Spine Chilling Exhibition		Karen Reichelt		
1985	1 Mar-11 Mar	Showing Together		Karen Reichelt		Held for Moomba Festival
1985	18 Mar-2 Jun	All the Fun of the Fair		Janine Barrand and Mimi Colligan		
1985	1 Apr-?	Strike Me Lucky!: The Great Days of Australian Vaudeville.				
1985	20 May-?	Joan Sutherland: La Stupenda.				
1985	10 Jun-8 Sep	Australian TV: The Story So Far		Virginia Mullumby, Frank Van Straten, and Karen Reichelt		
1985	29 Jul-?	Three Faces of Percy Grainger			OCLC 216711732.	
1985	23 Sep-1 Dec	Dressed to Thrill		Janine Barrand		Exhibition came from National Film and Sound Archive, Canberra (NFSA)
1985	7 Oct-24 Nov	Art and the Theatre in Victoria		Frank Van Straten	ISBN 0-9591265-1-1.	Celebrating Victoria's 150th Birthday. A Travelling Exhibition presented in association with the regional galleries of Victoria.
1985	8 Dec-16 Feb	Horror! II		Karen Reichelt		
1985	16 Dec-?	Still Alive				
1986	10 Feb-?	Pavlova: Invitation to the Dance				Exhibition repeated in April 1996
1986	24 Feb-?	Thanks for Listening		Frank Van Straten		
1986	14 Apr-?	Amazing! Tim and Debbie Discover the Performing Arts Museum				
1986	12 May-17 Aug	Clips: The Music Video Exhibition.		Sally Dawes		
1986	7 Jul-?	Animated Classics				
1986	15 Sep-?	A Peep into Dame Edna's Closet				
1986	6 Oct-?	Split Enz: Sew This is the Enz				
1986	2 Dec-?	Christmas Curiosity Shop				
1986	13 Dec-22 Feb	Horror! III: The Nightmare Continues		Karen Reichelt		
1987	9 Mar-?	Triffitt!				
1987	12 Mar-?	Silent Smiles				
1987	12 Mar-?	Moomba Schools Video Awards Exhibition				
1987	28 Mar-?	Moomba MIMA Film and Video Festival				
1987	15 Apr-12 Jul	Marvellous Melba	Celebrating Nellie Melba.	Joan Rutley, Frank Van Straten		Second exhibition on Dame Nellie Melba.
1987	22 Jun-?	Spangles at Sundown				
1987	27 Jul-13 Sep	Gone Bush		Frank Van Straten		Exhibition came from NFSA, Canberra
1987	21 Sep-?	The Sixties		Karen Reichelt, Janine Barrand		
1987	26 Oct-21 Feb	Constable				
1988	27 Feb-?	Dance! - The National Bicentennial Dance Exhibition				
1988	7 Mar-?	Comedy Makes an Exhibition of Itself		Greg Sealy		Original title 'See The Funny Side' - Part of 1988 Melbourne International Comedy Festival
1988	21 Mar-?	The Mo Show				
1988	28 Mar-?	The Great Music Makers	Louis Kahan drawings			
1988	? May-?	NIDA Exposed	Collections from National Institute of Dramatic Art, Sydney			
1988	27 Jun-?	La Mama: Happy Birthday!				
1988	4 Jul-11 Sep	George Dreyfus at Sixty				
1988	19 Jul-14 Aug	Historic Australian Theatre Posters		Peter Sumner		In association with Joseph Lebovic Gallery, Sydney
1988	22 Aug-12 Feb	The Neighbours Exhibition		Karen Reichelt		
1988	19 Sep-16 Nov	Performers In Bronze	Busts by Peter Latona	Australian Bicentennial Authority Touring Exhibition		
1988	28 Nov-?	Take '88				Touring NFSA exhibition
1989	28 Jan-?	Special People				
1989	4 Feb-?	Evie!	Tribute to Evie Hayes			
1989	22 Feb-26 Apr	Hooray For Hollywood!	Vintage Movie Posters	Frank Van Straten		
1989	1 Apr-?	The Fish of April	Luzio Grossi photographs			
1989	8 May-6 Aug	Out of the Box		Janine Barrand, Sally Dawes		
1989	10 Jun-22 Oct	The Beatles...All Those Years Ago	Celebrating The Beatles visit to Australia, 25 years ago	Karen Reichelt		
1989	4 Sep-29 Oct	Designs for Glamour: Angus Winneke's Tivoli Fantasies				
1989	4 Sep-?	Melba's Commode				Exhibited in Museum foyer
1989	15 Sep-?	Max Dupain's Dancers				
1989	16 Dec-12 Mar	Destination: Fantasy.		Frank Van Straten, Nina Stanton		

== 1990s ==
Year	Exhibition Dates	Exhibition Title	Exhibition Summary	Exhibition Curator	Exhibition Catalogue	Press/Reviews/Notes
1990	17 Mar-?	Broadway Revisited				
1990	1 Apr-24 May	Laugh: Exhibiting Humour In Television Advertising	TV ads which used humour to get their message across.			Part of Melbourne Comedy Festival
1990	14 April-?	Mahler In Wax				
1990	19 May-?	The Great Music Makers	Louis Kahan Drawings			Second time exhibited
1990	5 Jul-2 Sep	Fanfare: The Wonderful World of Collectors and Collecting			ISBN 0-7241-9836-9.	
1990	13 Aug-11 Nov	Chevron Nights				
1990	15 Sep-18 Nov	The Last Edwardians	Exhibition of memorabilia and photographs documenting the life of Violet Trefusis.			In association with the Melbourne International Festival
1990	20 Nov-2 Dec	Experimenta			OCLC 220813862.	Held at National Gallery of Victoria
1990	10 Dec-15 Feb	Carnegie Hall: 100 Years				Exhibition from USA partner
1990	10 Dec-31 Mar	Destination: Fantasy: The Adventure Continues				
1991	7 Mar-	Drag! Things Aren't Always What They Seem				
1991	15 Apr-21 Jul	Rockbiz: Back Stage and on the road with Crowded House		Janine Barrand		
1991	6 Jun	Pounder: A Great Lady of the Australian Theatre				
1991	12 Aug-17 Nov	Such Stuff as Dreams are Made On - An Exhibition of Melbourne Theatre Designers		Sally Dawes		
1991	12 Sep	Oscar Asche: The Rise and Fall of a Theatre Giant				Developed in association with the Queensland Performing Arts Trust
1991	5 Dec	Stars In Your Eyes				
1991	12 Dec-26 Apr	Return to Destination: Fantasy		Nina Stanton		
1992	17 Jan-15 Mar	New Orleans And All That Jazz			"New Orleans and all that jazz"	Collections for the New Orleans Jazz Club Collections, courtesy of Louisiana State Museum. Includes Australian jazz content loaned from APAC, Playbill, and Australian Jazz Archives, in association with the Mazda-Montsalvat Jazz Festival. Held at Westpac Gallery, Arts Centre Melbourne.
1992	5 Mar-26 Apr	Click! The Lens of Laurie Richards.				
1992	9 May-19 Jul	TV Times - 35 Years of Watching Television in Australia			ISBN 1-875632-01-8.	Exhibition from the Museum of Contemporary Art, Sydney
1992	5 Jun	The Imagemakers: Australian Directors in Frame			OCLC 222742100.	Exhibited at the State Library of NSW in August 1991
1992	29 Aug-29 Nov	Entertaining Melbourne				
1992	12 Sep	A Dance Treasury from the Australian Ballet Archives				
1992	15 Sep-14 Dec	Inge King Sculpture Exhibition				Held at National Gallery of Victoria
1992	4 Dec	Just Pretend I'm Not Here - Nick Cave and the Bad Seeds on Tour.	Photographic exhibition by Peter Milne of Nick Cave and the Bad Seeds On Tour, Europe 1992	Janine Barrand		
1992	12 Dec-28 Mar	In One Ear...and Out the Other				
1993	5 Mar	Back on the Bill!	J. C. Williamson Posters			
1993	2 Apr-25 Apr	The Jimi Hendrix Exhibition				
1993	1 May-27 Jun	Strictly Success: Strictly Ballroom				Exhibition from Powerhouse Museum, Sydney
1993	1 May	The Romper Stomper Images				Exhibition from the Photographer's Gallery, Melbourne
1993	7 Jul-5 Sep	Much Ado About Shakespeare				
1993	14 Jul-5 Sep	Laugh Away Your Worries				
1993	17 Sep-28 Nov	Timewarp: The Seventies Exhibition		Carolyn Laffan		
1993	17 Sep	YOU! Photographs of You, the Audience	Photographs by Emmanuel Santos.			
1993	27 Nov-5 Feb	A Handful of Characters: Puppets from Australasia				Previously exhibited at East West Gallery, Melbourne
1993	18 Dec-20 Mar	Stowaway: The Adventurous Exhibition				
1994	10 Feb	Ballet Shoes Transformed into Artworks				From Western Australian Ballet
1994	24 Mar-1 May	Bob Marley: An Exhibition				
1994	15 Apr-12 Jun	Corroboree: Sights and Sound of the First Australians		Carolyn Laffan	OCLC 1255604578.	
1994	11 May-26 Jun	A Special Madness: Celebrating the Thirtieth Anniversary of the Beatles in Australia			ISBN 0-7241-8459-7.	
1994	15 Jun	“Welcome to Television”	Laurie Richards photographs.			
1994	6 Jul-11 Sep	Memories of Melba				Designed by Anna French
1994	27 Aug	National Treasure: A Tribute to Gertrude Johnson and the National Theatre				
1994	21 Sep-27 Nov	“Ego Is Not a Dirty Word”: The Skyhooks Exhibition	Celebrating twenty years since The Skyhooks released their debut album,			
1994	16 Nov	“We Laugh at Death”				
1994	10 Dec-22 Mar	Out of this World: The Science Fiction Exhibition		Carolyn Laffan		
1995	25 Feb	Sweethearts of Rhythm: All-Ladies Dance Bands of the 1920s and 1930s		Dr Kay Dreyfus		
1995	1 Apr-16 Jul	A Pack of Cards: Comedy Makes An Exhibition Of Itself				
1995	1 Jun-3 Sep	Marilyn - An Appreciation	Exhibition on Marilyn Monroe for 40th anniversary of the release of The Seven Year Itch.			
1995	25 Jul-11 Oct	Jaffas Down the Aisle: A Century Of Cinema-Going				Collaboration with the NFSA Melbourne office. Designed by Mark Wager
1995	19 Oct-6 Dec	The Art of Stage Design: Costumes by Kristian Fredrikson				Designed by Anna French
1995	11 Dec-21 Apr	Once Upon A Pantomime: A Topsy-Turvy Exhibition		Carolyn Laffan		
1996	8 Mar	Hidden Desires: One Hundred Years of Victoria's Women Playwrights		Carolyn Pickett with Carolyn Laffan		
1996	4 May-14 Jul	Real Wild Child: Australian Rock Music Then and Now				Exhibition from the Powerhouse Museum, Sydney. Opened by Michael Gudinski
1996	17 May	Out there: Images at the Edge of Melbourne's Music Scene		Angela Jooste		Part of Next Wave Festival
1996	30 Jul-17 Nov	Tivoli: A Positively Titillating Exhibition		Frank Van Straten		Travels to Queensland Performing Arts Complex 19 Feb-4 May 1997.
1996	5 Oct-17 Nov	Tom Roberts Retrospective			ISBN 0-7308-3049-7.	Held at Art Gallery of South Australia
1996	4 Nov-7 Nov	Playbox 21st Birthday Exhibition				
1996	3 Dec-1 Apr	It Came from Backstage: An Exhibition of Theatrical Thrills				
1997	27 Mar-15 Jun	Punkculture: Images from a Music Revolution		Australian content curated by Angela Jooste		Produced in association with Exhibit-A, London and Write Angle, Australia
1997	24 Apr-31 Jul	Dance People Dance				A travelling exhibition of the National Library of Australia
1997	May	Rehearsing Rites – Tim Webster		Carolyn Laffan		
1997	1 Jul-30 Nov	Techno'tainment: Revealing Theatre Technology		Elyse White		
1997	15 Dec-1 Feb	The Circus Comes to Town. 150 Years of Australian Circus.				
1997	17 Jan-26 Jan	Circus Comes To Town: Summer Live - Circus				
1998	Jul	Handspan Puppets				
1998	6 Oct-28 Feb	Kindred Spirits: The Performing Arts Family				
1999	Feb	Green Room Awards Exhibition Honouring Bud Tingwell				
1999	26 Mar-27 Jun	Humphriana: The Alter Egos of Barry Humphries				
1999	3 Apr-30 May	Dame Edna's Frock-A-Thon: A Journey From Cardigan to Couture			ISBN 0-7311-5255-7.	Costume Designed by Stephen Adnitt
1999	Jul-Aug	Ready Steady Go!: Photographs of the Australian Rock and Pop Scene, 1956–71			ISBN 0-646-37568-7.	
1999	14 Aug-30 Nov	Director's Cut: Roger Hodgman at Melbourne Theatre Company		Carolyn Laffan		
1999	Sep-Oct	The Magic of it all				
1999	10 Dec-6 Feb	Archibald Prize				
1999	Dec-Feb	Mr Brodziak and the Beatles				
1999	Dec-Feb	Please Leave Quietly: Images From Melbourne's Independent Music Scene				

== 2000s ==
Year	Exhibition Dates	Exhibition Title	Exhibition Summary	Exhibition Curator	Exhibition Catalogue	Press/Reviews/Notes
2000	3 Feb-12 Mar	Dame Edna's Frock-A-Thon: From Cardigan to Couture			ISBN 0-7311-5255-7.	Repeated from 1999.
2000	12 Feb-26 Mar	John Spooner: Recent Thoughts			OCLC 990045125.	
2000	Feb-Mar	Green Room Lifetime Achievement Award - Jill Perryman 2000				
2000	23 Mar-7 May	Taken on Request: Photographs of the Melbourne Comedy Scene, 1979-1989				
2000	31 Mar-7 May	Of My Country: Emily Kame Kngwarreye				
2000	7 Apr-18 Jun	Look This Way: photographic portraits from the Performing Arts Collection				
2000	5 May-9 Jul	Quaintly Wild: Discotheque Dens of Style		Margaret Marshall		
2000	23 Jun-17 Sep	Paradise Garden: Sidney Nolan's Garden of Earthly Delights and Despairs				
2000	14 Jul-27 Aug	Bel Canto: The Story of Italian Opera in Australia		Carolyn Laffan		
2000	Sep	Glossy: A travelling exhibition from The National Portrait Gallery				
2000	Sep	Women's Circus: leaping off the edge				
2000	Oct	Tutu: Greg Barrett				
2000	1 Dec-25 Feb	Looks Cool, Sounds Hot: Jazz in Melbourne - the first 50 years		Margaret Marshall		
2001	9 Feb-25 Apr	Star Spangled Manner: Americans and the Birth of Australian Television				
2001	Feb	Green Room Lifetime Achievement Award - 2001				
2001	5 May-15 Jul	Nellie Stewart - Australia's Darling of the Stage		Margaret Marshall		
2001	May	Cats and Kings and other things: Costume designs from early 20th century pantomime				
2001	May-Jul	Pantomime Designs				
2001	May-Jul	Nellie Stewart: Australia's Sweet-heart		Margaret Marshall		
2001	Jun	Off the Wall				
2001	14 Sep-14 Jan	A Dream of Passion: The Bell Shakespeare Company		Carolyn Laffan		Later tours Frankston Cultural Centre
2002	8 Feb-31 Mar	A Step in Time: 40 Years of The Australian Ballet		Margot Anderson		
2002	2 Aug-13 Oct	Into the Limelight: Recent Acquisitions				
2002	23 Nov-3 Feb	John Truscott: A Contract To Dream				
2002	?	Archibald Prize 2001				
2003	7 Feb-13 Apr	As the Drama Unfolds: 50 years with Melbourne Theatre Company		Margaret Marshall		
2003	2 May-25 Jun	Act XII - New Works On Paper			ISBN 0-646-42294-4.	Held in George Adams Gallery. Later toured UTS Gallery Sydney 29 July-29 August, Artspace Adelaide 13 September-11 October
2003	2 Jul-24 Aug	Rarely Everage: The Lives of Barry Humphries				Collaboration with National Portrait Gallery, Canberra
2003	29 Aug-5 Oct	Drawn, Worn and Reborn: Stories from the Performing Arts Museum Costume Collection				
2003	21 Oct-22 Feb	CIRCUS: Under the Big Top				
2003		Archibald Prize 2002				
2004	13 Feb-4 Apr	Creating A Scene: Australian Artists As Stage Designers 1940-1965			ISBN 0-646-43109-9.	
2004	9 Apr-30 May	Garden For All Seasons: Paintings by Anne Marie Graham				
2004	4 Jun-1 Aug	Australians In Hollywood				
2004	6 Aug-3 Oct	Making a Song and Dance: The Quest For An Australian Musical		Margaret Marshall	ISBN 0-646-43786-0.	
2004	29 Oct-14 Nov	Chameleon: John Timbers				
2004		Archibald Prize 2003				
2004		Hibiki & Kuukan				
2004		Mark Ogge				
2005	15 Jan-25 Apr	Kylie: An Exhibition			ISBN 0-9757406-0-1.	Exhibition toured nationally and internationally in 2005 to National Portrait Gallery Queensland, Performing Arts Centre Museum of Applied Arts and Sciences, Victoria Albert Museum, Manchester Art Gallery, and Kelvingrove Art Gallery and Museum.
2005	? May-? Oct	The Magic Tent				
2005		Archibald Prize 2004				
2005	25 Nov-29 Jan	Archibald Prize 2005				
2005	13 May-10 Jul	The Sound of Painting			ISBN 0-9757406-2-8.	
2006	7 Apr-2 Jul	Bravo! Celebrating 50 Years of Opera Australia		Margot Anderson	ISBN 0-9757406-5-2.	
2006	10 Feb-1 Mar	Dancelines			ISBN 0-9757406-4-4.	
2006	17 Nov-18 Feb	Ednaville: The Exhibition			ISBN 0-9757406-7-9.	Part of Ednafest: Melbourne Celebration, 50 Golden Years of Dame Edna
2006	27 Nov-25 Feb	Celebrity Mannequin				Part of Ednafest: Melbourne Celebration, 50 Golden Years of Dame Edna
2007	28 Feb-8 Aug	Australian Impressionism				Held at National Gallery of Victoria. APAC loaned two Tom Roberts paintings for exhibition.
2007	20 Jul-7 Oct	Drawn To The Stage			ISBN 978-0-9757406-8-2.	
2007	1 Nov-1 Apr	Nick Cave: The Exhibition		Janine Barrand		Later toured QPAC Brisbane 24 March to 10 May; WA Museum Perth 23 May to 19 July; NLA Canberra 15 August to 29 November. Book published 'Nick Cave stories : told in four chapters' ISBN 978-0-9757406-9-9in association with exhibition.
2007	18 May-15 Jul	The Circus Diaries: intimate portraits of Australian circus families	Photos by Andrea Lemon and Cal Mackinnon	Andrea Lemon	OCLC 271751164.	
2008	19 Jul-26 Oct	Seamless: Where Costume Meets Dance		Margot Anderson	OCLC 658056468.	
2008	2 Oct-26 Oct	B-Side Music Portrait				
2008	8 Nov-26 Jan	ARIA Hall of Fame 2008				
2008	14 Nov-15 Feb	Peter Allen: The Exhibition		Margaret Marshall	ISBN 978-0-9802958-0-1.	
2008	5 Dec-?	Lynne Golding Tribute				
2008	12 Apr-13 Jul	Silver Lined: Contemporary Artists and the Performing Arts Collection			OCLC 271892543.	
2009	6 Feb-13Apr	The Bowl: Celebrating 50 Years of the Sidney Myer Music Bowl				
2009	21 Feb-31 May	Step Right Up				
2009	6 Jun-21 Jun	10th Biennial Leviny Commemorative Exhibition				
2009	6 Jun-20 Sep	Creative Australia & the Ballets Russes			ISBN 978-0-9802958-1-8.	Later toured to Shepparton Art Gallery and Hamilton Art Gallery
2009	27 Aug-14 Mar	ARIA Hall of Fame 2009				
2009	5 Nov-28 Feb	AC/DC Australia's Family Jewels		Tim Fisher	ISBN 978-0-9802958-2-5.	Later toured Museum of Applied Arts and Sciences, Museum and Art Gallery of the Northern Territory, Western Australian Museum, Kelvingrove Art Gallery and Museum, Experience Music Project | Science Fiction Museum and Hall of Fame (EMP | SFM).

== 2010s ==
Year	Exhibition Dates	Exhibition Title	Exhibition Summary	Exhibition Curator	Exhibition Catalogue	Press/Reviews/Notes
2010	6 Mar-? Jun	Bobby Dazzler			ISBN 978-0-9802958-3-2.	Touring Exhibition presented by QPAC, includes material from the APAC.
2010	16 Jun-19 Sep	Sight & Sound: Music & Abstraction in Australian Art			ISBN 978-0-9802958-4-9	
2010	6 Nov-27 Feb	Rock Chicks			ISBN 978-0-9802958-5-6.	
2011	12 Mar-5 Jun	Wild Things - Animals On Stage		Tim Fisher		
2011	23 Mar-23 Jun	25 Years of Laughs Melbourne International Comedy Festival 1987-2011				
2011	4 Jun-18 Sep	Black Box White Cube - Aspects of Performance in Contemporary Australian Art			ISBN 978-0-9802958-6-3.	
2011	23 Jun-10 Oct	Let's Show the World - National Display				
2011	5 Nov-26 Feb	Reg Livermore - Take a Bow		Margaret Marshall	ISBN 978-0-9802958-7-0.	
2011	15 Nov-28 Feb	The play's the thing…Simon Phillips 12 years as Artistic Director of Melbourne Theatre Company				
2012	25 Feb-27 May	A Sunbury Day Out				
2012	2 Mar-27 May	Singing the World				
2012	9 Jun-23 Sep	Time in Motion: 50 Years of the Australian Ballet			OCLC 842063726.	Featured an online component with exhibition highlights.
2012	28 Jul-29 Jul	Dressing Room 34	Display for Open House Melbourne.			
2012	10 Nov-17 Mar	War Horse and the Breath of Life				
2013	23 Mar-23 Jun	Performative Prints from the Torres Strait	Selected works by four prominent contemporary Torres Strait Islander artists – Ricardo Idagi, Ellen Jose, Brian Robinson and Alick Tipot.	Dr. Steven Tonkin. Assistant curator Bridget MacLeod	ISBN 978-0-9802958-8-7.	
2013	6 Jul-3 Nov	The Extraordinary Shapes of Geoffrey Rush		Margaret Marshall	ISBN 978-0-9802958-9-4.	
2013	8 Aug-1 Sep	The Contemporary Silver and Metalwork Award 2013				Presented in partnership with Buda Historic Home and Garden, Castlemaine.
2013	5 Sep-6 Nov	Celebrating John Truscott				Held in Arts Centre Melbourne’s Smorgon Family Plaza.
2013	16 Nov-23 Feb	All That Glitters	Costumes from the Performing Arts Collection			
2014	8 Mar-1 Jul	The Beatles in Australia		Peter Cox (Powerhouse Museum) Carolyn Laffan		Held in partnership with Powerhouse Museum, Sydney.
2014	22 Mar-27 Jul	Louis Kahan: The Great Music Makers				Held in the St Kilda Road Foyer, Arts Centre Melbourne. Selections from The Great Music Makers donated by the ANZ Bank in 1987.
2014	12 Jul-28 Sep	Show Time: Spotlight on the Art Collection				
2014	2 Aug-23 Nov	50 Years of The Australian Ballet School				
2014	15 Nov-29 Mar	Flash!	Photography from APAC collection			
2015	18 Apr-20 Sep	Theatres of War: Wartime entertainment and the Australian experience		Carolyn Laffan, Margaret Marshall	OCLC 910498938.	Later toured Queensland Performing Arts Centre, Brisbane 9 Feb 2016 – 4 June 2016, Adelaide Festival Centre 2 Dec 2016 – 31 Jan 2017, Glasshouse Regional Gallery, and Port Macquarie 17 Feb 2017 - 30 Apr 2017
2015	13 Nov-28 Feb	Making of Midnight Oil				
2016	12 Mar-17 Apr	Humour Us: Comedy Festival 30th Anniversary Exhibition				
2016	29 Apr-4 Sep	Stage Presence - Design from the Australian Performing Arts Collection		Carolyn Laffan, Lesley Harding	ISBN 978-0-9924935-1-6.	
2016	17 Sep-22 Jan	Kylie on Stage		Margot Anderson	OCLC 1038063550.	Later toured Mildura Arts Centre, Geelong Gallery, Ararat Regional Art Gallery, Latrobe Regional Gallery, Western Australian Maritime Museum
2017	11 Feb-21 May	Political Acts: Pioneers of Performance Art in Southeast Asia		Dr Steven Tonkin	ISBN 978-0-9924935-2-3.	
2017	3 Jun-17 Sep	Print and Paste: Posters from the Australian Performing Arts Collection				
2020	23 Mar-13 Feb	Stranger than Kindness: The Nick Cave Exhibition		Janine Barrand		Nick Cave Exhibition held at Royal Danish Library using APAC collection, but different items than previous APAC exhibitions
