= Carolyn Laffan =

Australian curator

- Born: 26 October 1967
- Died: 9 April 2024 (aged 56); Melbourne, Victoria, Australia
- Occupation: Curator
- Years active: 1990–2024
- Known for: Australian Music Vault

Carolyn Anne Laffan (26 October 1967-9 April 2024) was an Australian curator at Arts Centre Melbourne and became Senior Curator of the Australian Music Vault from 2017.

== Personal life ==
Carolyn Anne Laffan was born in 1967 and grew up with two siblings. With her partner Tom, she had two children. While doing museum studies in 1990 she undertook a work placement at Arts Centre Melbourne. In 1997 Laffan completed her Master of Arts thesis "When a boy from Alabama meets a girl from Gundagai : social dancing in Melbourne, 1942-1943" at University of Melbourne, which deals with social dancing in that city in mid-World War 2. She died in 2024.

== Career ==
Laffan began working for the Australian Performing Arts Collection at Arts Centre Melbourne in 1990. Through her work as researcher and exhibition curator, she presented the work of women and Australian First Nations artists, such as exhibitions at the Arts Centre Corroboree: Sights and Sound of the First Australians (1994) and Hidden Desires: One Hundred Years of Victoria's Women Playwrights (1996).

Laffan also curated exhibitions on The Beatles' Australian tour, The Australian Ballet, and Barry Humphries. She was Senior Curator of the Australian Music Vault when it opened in 2017. Laffan was recognised for her efforts preserving Australian cultural artefacts through her work at the Australian Music Vault until her death in April 2024.

== Bibliography ==
- Laffan, Carolyn, "Drawn to the stage: two centuries of Australian stage design" in The Arts Centre Presents 'Drawn to the Stage' (2007). Victorian Arts Centre Trust. ISBN 978-0-9757406-8-2
- Laffan, Carolyn (curator); Marshall, Margaret (curator); Theatres of war: wartime entertainment & the Australian experience (2015). Arts Centre Melbourne.
- Tonkin, Steven; Barrand, Janine; Anderson, Margot; Laffan, Carolyn; et al. Show time: the art collection of Arts Centre Melbourne (2014). Arts Centre Melbourne. ISBN 978-0-9924935-0-9.
