= Alice Dolphin =

Australian musician (1900–1985)

Alice Isobel Dolphin (née Organ; 1900–1985) was an Australian musician who played clarinet, saxophone, piano, and cornet.

== Career ==
Alice Dolphin was born in Cheltenham, Victoria. Her family were musicians and she learnt to play piano as a child, performing in public for the first time around the age of 10, when she filled in on organ at a church. During her teens she began her professional career as a musician, performing at picture theatre matinees, and gained press attention by playing the piano and cornet simultaneously, accompanying her own solos.

Between 1923 and 1926, Dolphin played in different musical groups around Melbourne, before moving to Sydney to perform as a duo with Elsa Lewis. After two years, Dolphin returned to Melbourne with violin maker William Edward Dolphin where they married.

When Thelma Ready started her all-girl orchestra, she hired Alice Dolphin as a saxophonist. Formed in 1928, The Thelma Ready Orchestra made regular appearances on radio, played in hotels around Melbourne and is considered "Australia's first all-girl dance band".

During the Great Depression, Alice Dolphin's work as a musician supported her family with regular performances. She had her own group, the Alice Dolphin Orchestra in the 1930s, and was also a member of Eve Rees and her Merrymakers, The Hollywood Redheads, and The Marion Lightfoot Orchestra. She was also a regular on The Minstrel Show broadcast over radio station 3DB

Once retired, she took to writing, and her collection of essays, musical compositions, pantomimes, poems, and prose fiction are held by the Australian Performing Arts Collection.

Alice Dolphin died in 1985, aged 84. Her husband William had died in 1981. They had one son, Paul.

== Gallery ==
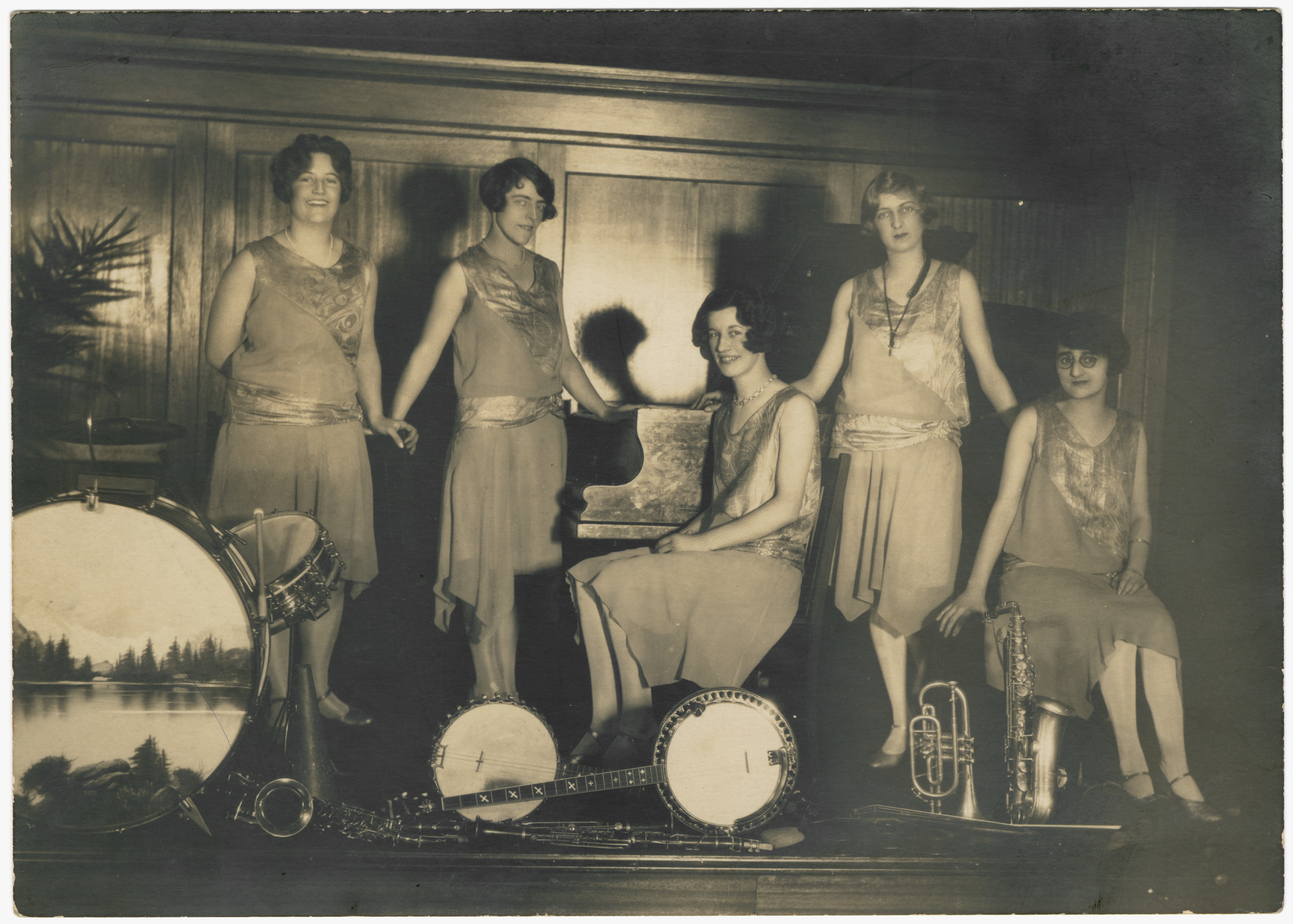
Thelma Ready's Orchestra on stage at the Grill Room, Hotel Australia c1929. Musicians include: Lilian Stender, Kath McCall, Thelma Ready, Alice Organ/Dolphin, and Lena Sturrock.

Eve Rees' Merrymakers at the Mayoral Ball held at Caulfield Town Hall. Musicians include: Eve Rees, Gwen Mitchell, Stella Funston, Lorna Quon, Alma Quon, Alice Dolphin, and Grace Funston.

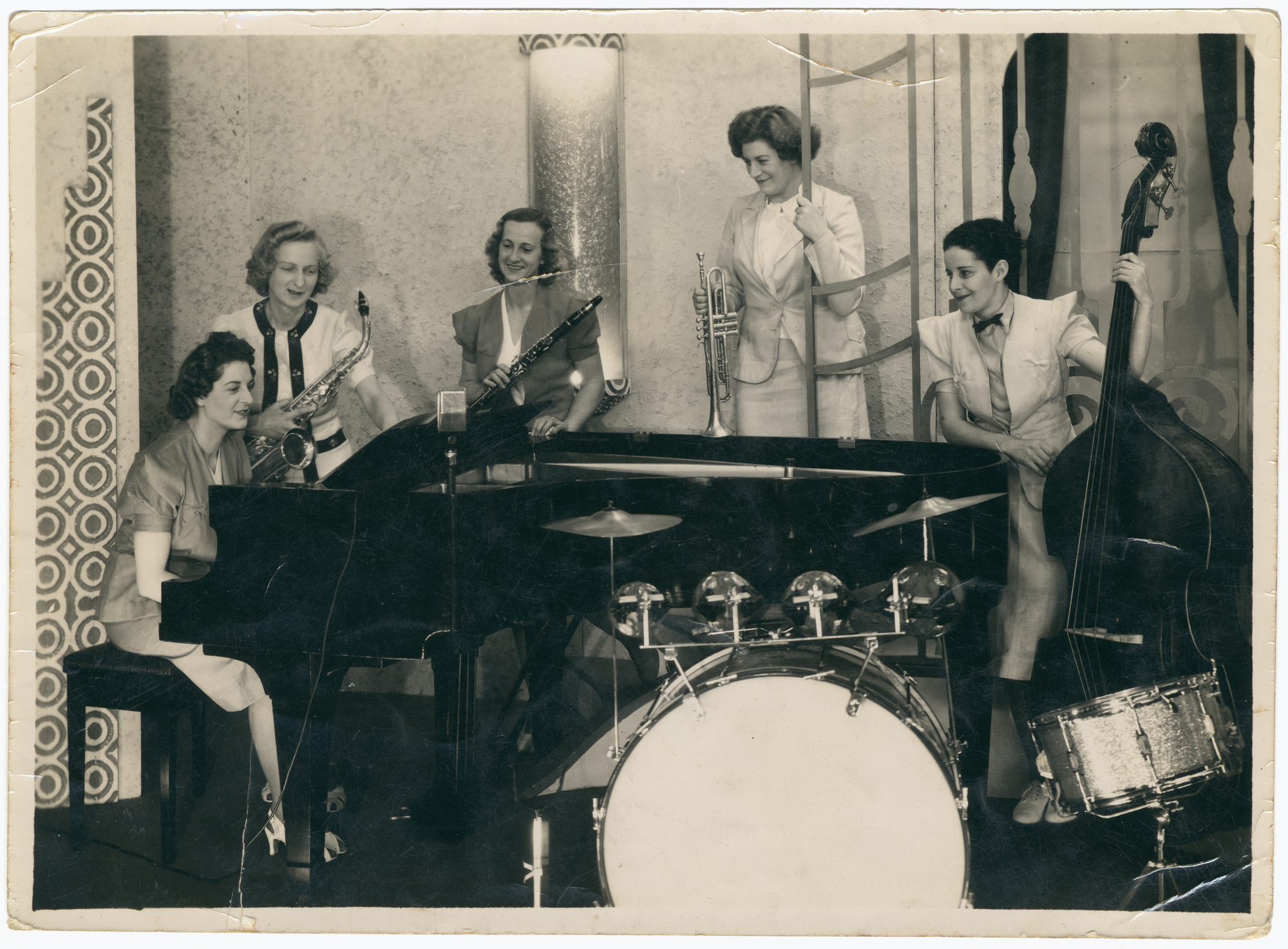
Alice Dolphin Orchestra performing in the dining room at Foy and Gibson c1935. Musicians include: Joyce Smith, Alice Dolphin, Molly Byron, Phyllis Smith and Marj Brown. Photograph by C.J. Frazer.
