= Heather B. Swann =

Australian artist

- Born: 1961 (age 64–65); Hobart, Tasmania
- Education: University of Tasmania
- Movement: Contemporary art

Heather B. Swann (born 1961 in Hobart, Tasmania) is an Australian contemporary artist known for her expressive surrealist sculptural objects, alongside paintings, ink drawings and performance work. Swann is interested in the human condition, ‘the intensity of emotions and passions, our deep longing, our desire, our sensuousness and our sensuality’. She has received significant recognition for her work, which is held in prominent collections including the National Gallery of Australia, National Gallery of Victoria and the Art Gallery of South Australia.

== Career ==
"My work is a way of holding on to the world. My sculptures and drawings are figurative and modernist in expression, with curved forms, an insistent use of black and a marked surrealist accent."

Heather B. Swann has held over 20 solo exhibitions in commercial and public galleries since 1993. Her work since 2020 has explored figures drawn from the mythology of Classical Greece, in particular the story of Leda and the Swan. With influences ranging from myth to science, emotion to world history, Swann's work engages with a poetics of intimacy, a dark and surreal presence that translates these atavistic instincts into material form.

== Recognition, scholarship and awards ==
- Copyright Agency Commission, UNSW Galleries (2026)
- Barbara Tribe Travelling Art Scholarship, Paris (2025)
- Setouchi Triennale Commission, with Nonda Katsalidis (2022)
- Paul Guest Drawing Prize (2014)
- Goddard Sapin-Jaloustre Scholarship, France (2005)
- Rosamund McCulloch Scholarship, University of Tasmania, Cite Internationale des Arts, Paris, France (1998)

== Selected Publications ==
- Heather B. Swann: Leda and the Swan (2022), Tarrawarra Museum of Art
- Heather B Swann: nervous / rhythm (2018), Michael Bugelli Publishing

== Notable Exhibitions ==
- Wynne Prize (finalist), Art Gallery of New South Wales (2025)
- Inner Sanctum, Adelaide Biennale of Contemporary Art, Art Gallery of South Australia (2024)
- From the Other Side, Australian Centre for Contemporary Art, Melbourne (2023-2024)
- The National 4: Heather B. Swann, Art Gallery of New South Wales (2023)
- Leda and the Swan, Tarrawarra Museum of Art, Victoria (2021-2022)
- Know my name: Australian women artists 1900 to now, National Gallery of Australia, Canberra (2021 - 2022)
- I LET MY BODY FALL INTO A RHYTHM, BuOY Arts Centre, Tokyo, Japan and The Ian Potter Museum of Art, Melbourne, Australia (2017-2018)
- Nervous, National Gallery of Australia, Canberra (2017)
- Banksia Men, 2016 Adelaide Biennial of Australian Art: Magic Object, Art Gallery of South Australia, Adelaide (2016)
- Paul Guest Drawing Prize, Bendigo Art Gallery, Bendigo (2014)
- Solitaire, TarraWarra Museum of Art, Victoria (2014)
- Louise Bourgeois and Australian Artists, Heide Museum of Modern Art, Melbourne (2012)
- Seven Things To Do In An Emergency, The British School at Rome, Rome (2011)
- Woollahra Small Sculpture Prize (finalist), Woollahra, Sydney (2007 & 2006)
- National Sculpture Prize and Exhibition, National Gallery of Australia, Canberra (2001)
