= Thelma Ready =

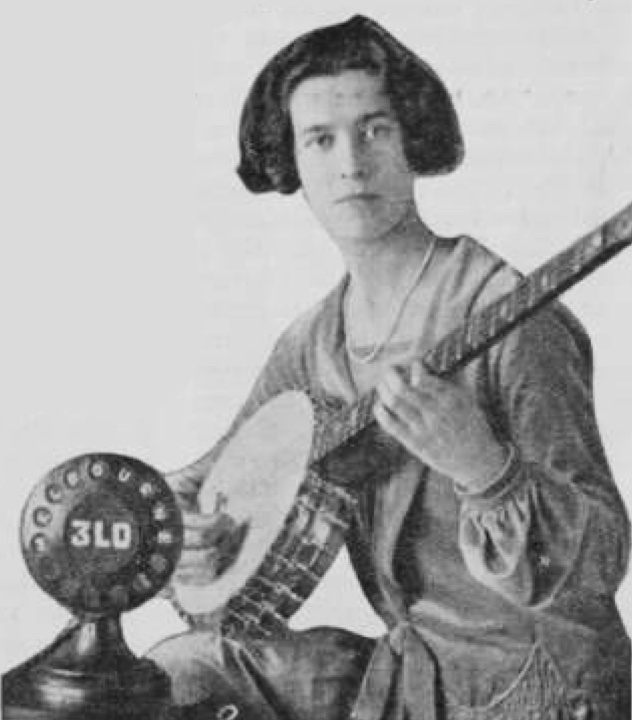
- Thelma Ready c. 1926

Background information
- Born: 23 September 1903; Tasmania, Australia
- Died: 28 July 2004 (aged 100)
- Instrument: Banjo

Thelma Constance Ready (1903–2004) was an Australian banjo musician, based in Melbourne.

== Career ==
Thelma Ready was born in Tasmania 23 September 1903, and begun playing banjo when her father visited America and bought the instrument for her as a gift. After taking lessons, she began finding work as a soloist and as leader of her own orchestra.

She led what is considered "Australia's first all-girl dance band", The Thelma Ready Orchestra in Melbourne during the 1920s. The band were formed in 1928, and featured Ready (banjo), Kath McCall (piano), Lena Sturrock (violin), Alice Organ/Dolphin (saxophone, clarinet, cornet), and Lillian Stender (vocals, drums). They had residencies at the Mayfair Cafe in St Kilda, and hotels such as Menzies, Oriental, and Hotel Australia, as well as regular appearances on radio.

She also performed with The Kentucky Three, Thelma Ready's Melody Maids, and Thelma Ready's Mayfair Maids.

== Personal life ==
Thelma Ready was the second daughter of Australian senator Rudolph Keith Ready and his wife Pia. She had four siblings.

In September 1933, Thelma Ready was engaged to Eric Alexander Badenach. They were married at the Holy Trinity Church, Kew in March 1935. On 31 October 1941, their daughter Gael was born.

Thelma died 28 Jul 2004 and is buried at Springvale Botanical Cemetery.

== Gallery ==
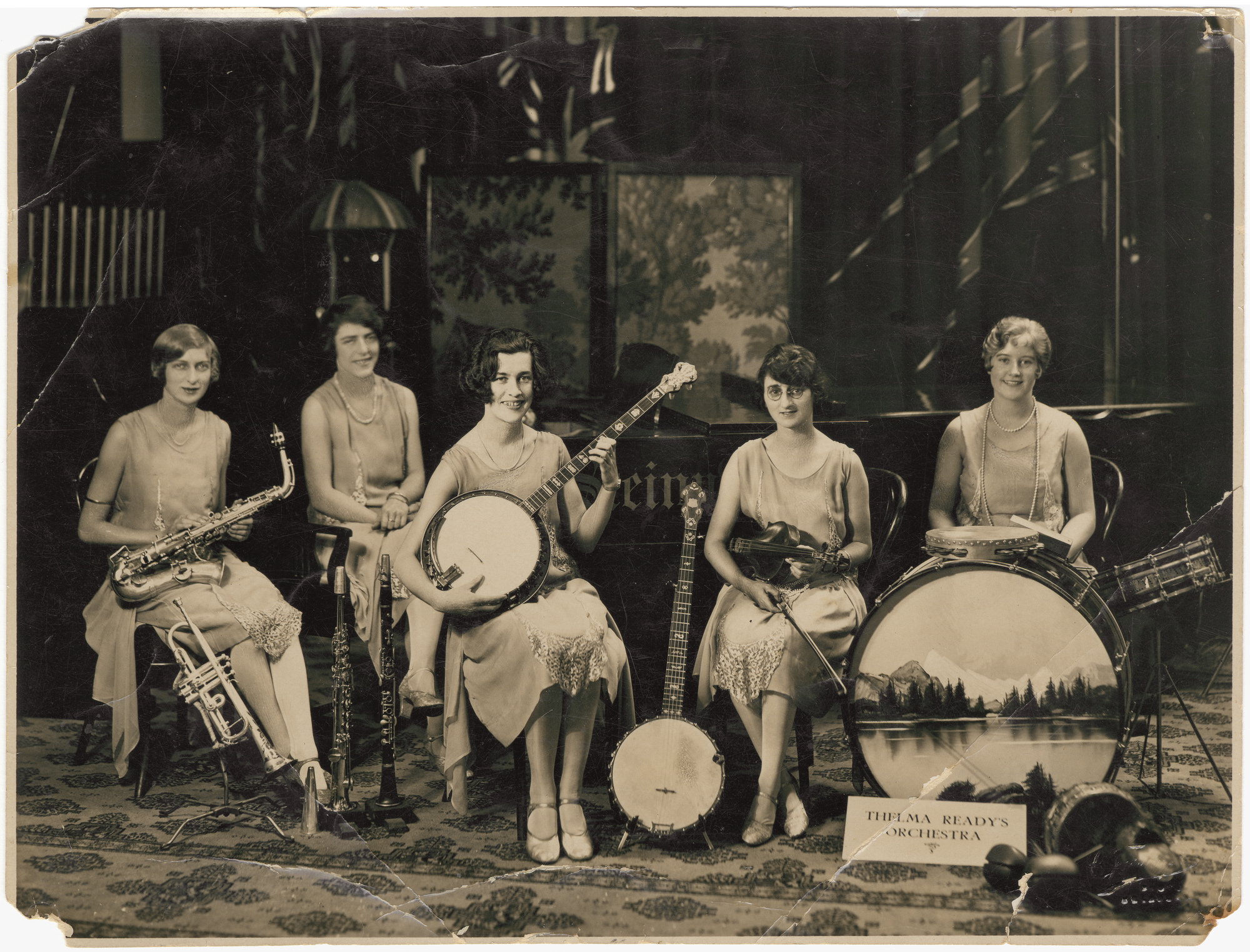
Thelma Ready's Orchestra performing at Hotel Australia c1928. Musicians include: Alice Organ/Dolphin, Kath McCall, Thelma Ready, Lena Sturrock, and Lilian Stender.

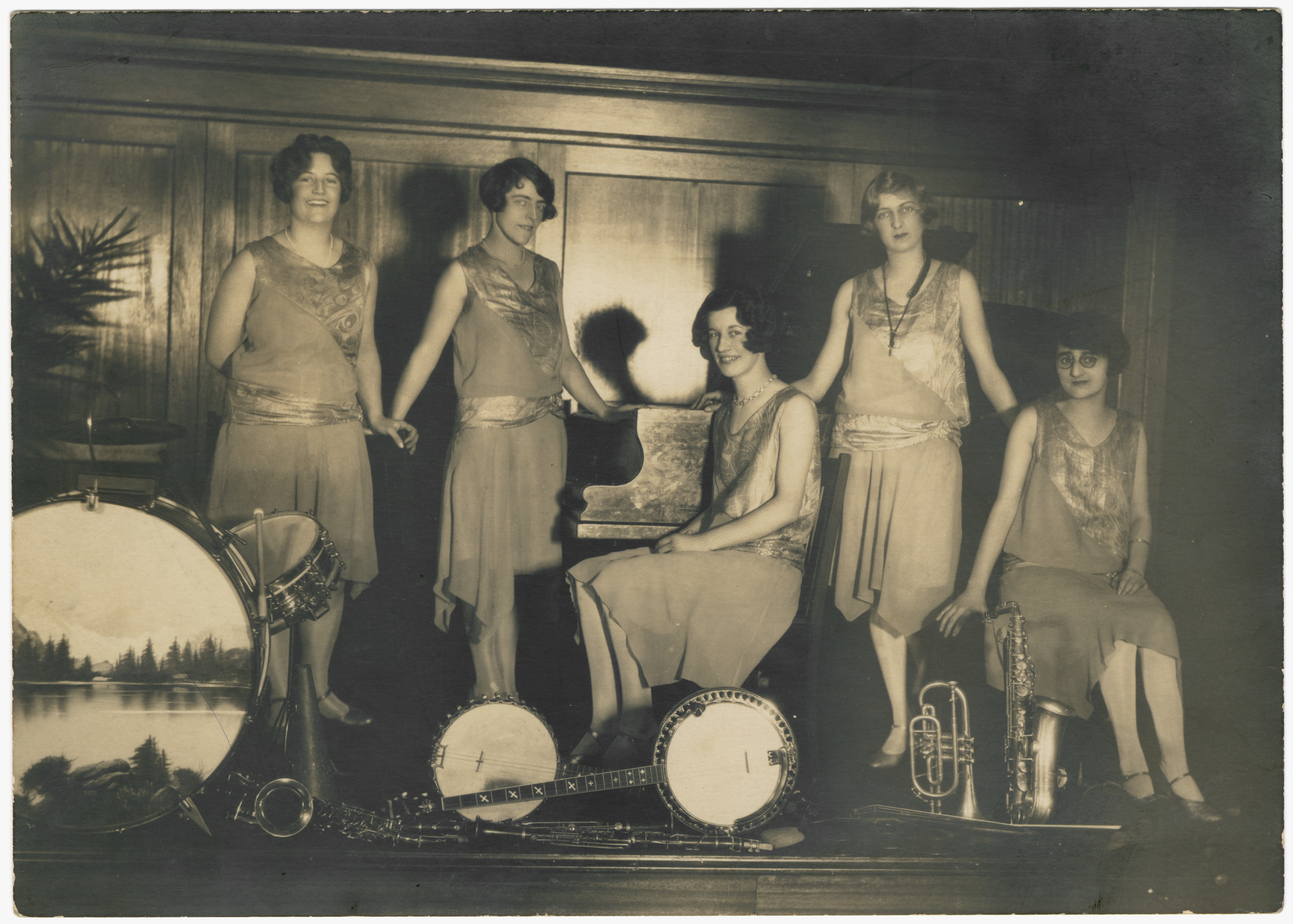
Thelma Ready's Orchestra on stage at the Grill Room, Hotel Australia c1929. Musicians include: Lilian Stender, Kath McCall, Thelma Ready, Alice Organ/Dolphin, and Lena Sturrock.
