= Stieg Persson =

Australian artist

- Born: Melbourne, Australia
- Education: Victorian College of the Arts, Melbourne
- Known for: Contemporary art
- Movement: Postmodernism
- Awards: Arthur Guy Memorial Painting Prize

Stieg Persson is an Australian contemporary artist whose work is represented in all of the country's major art museums.

== Early life and education ==
Stieg Persson was born in Melbourne, Australia.

His undergraduate studies were at the Victorian College of the Arts from 1979 to 1981. He completed a master's degree from the same institution in 1998.

== Career ==
Persson has participated in many solo and group exhibitions in Australia and internationally since the early 1980s and is represented in all of the country's major art museums.

Considered among the first of the country's postmodern painters, Persson's early work is characterised by his eclectic source material, monochromatic palettes, the use of arabesques and a free interplay between abstraction and figuration. His more recent paintings have tended towards abstraction.

In 2003 he won the inaugural Arthur Guy Memorial Painting Prize from the Bendigo Art Gallery (then Australia's richest open painting prize), worth $50,000.

In 2018 he was the subject of a major survey. Polyphonic, at the Ian Potter Museum of Art at the University of Melbourne.
