= Karen Quinlan (arts administrator) =

Australian 21st century arts administrator and public gallery director

Karen Quinlan AM
- Born: East Melbourne
- Education: Melbourne State College
- Occupations: curator, gallery director
- Employer: Arts Centre Melbourne
- Board member of: Trustee of the State Library of Victoria; Public Galleries Association of Victoria; Victorian Foundation of Living Australian Artists, for the National Gallery of Victoria
- Awards: Order of Australia

Karen Quinlan AM is an Australian arts administrator. Director at Bendigo Art Gallery, she worked with international cultural institutions to bring high-profile exhibitions to regional Victoria. She directed Australia's National Portrait Gallery, before being appointed chief executive of Arts Centre Melbourne.

== Early life and education ==
Karen Louise Quinlan was born in the 1960s in East Melbourne. Quinlan studied for a Bachelor of Education at the University of Melbourne (formerly, Melbourne State College). When studying for her teaching qualification, she majored in Fine Art, pursued her interest in Australian women artists in Art History, wrote her thesis on Thea Proctor, and continues to research the painter Agnes Goodsir. In printmaking she took the textiles specialisation in fabric printing.

== Early career ==
On finishing the Melbourne teachers' college course, for five years Quinlan taught practical art, garment construction and textiles, and art history, in a Melbourne Catholic secondary girls' school, where she remembers "One student actually entered the Gown of the Year competition [in] year 12, became a pattern maker, and teaches at RMIT now."

The school at which Quinlan taught closed down and, pursuing her interest in collections, textiles and costume conservation, in 1994 she volunteered at the National Gallery of Victoria under curator Robyn Healy, then successfully applied for a position there as a curator, and undertook the cataloguing of the Thomas Harrison Hat Collection.

Quinlan then moved to Bendigo Art Gallery in 1996 on a twelve-month contract, wanting to expand her expertise in working with more diverse collections. She stayed a further three years, curating exhibitions of painting, print-making and other media from the collection, and with loaned works, and lent its holdings to other institutions, and through the research required, developed her knowledge of late nineteenth and early twentieth century artists; in particular women artists and their movement from Australia to Paris, and Australia to London.

== Director, Bendigo Art Gallery 2000–2018 ==
Quinlan was promoted to director at Bendigo Art Gallery in 2000 when residing in Castlemaine and pregnant with the first of her two children. During her tenure at Bendigo, Quinlan identified fashion as being a distinct attraction for visitors to a regional city, and worked with international institutions to bring large exhibitions of couture to Bendigo. The strategy encouraged cultural tourism, with visitor numbers to individual shows often exceeding 150,000, with advantage to the regional economy, so successful that Lawrenson and O'Reilly consider these as instances of the 'blockbuster' imperative amongst Australian public galleries:

Bendigo Art Gallery is a perfect example of this. In a city of some 112,000 people located a two-hour drive from Melbourne, the historic art gallery has sought out new ways to develop its brand under the leadership of Karen Quinlan

Quinlan travelled to the Victoria and Albert Museum's exhibition The Golden Age of Couture, focused on Paris and London fashion trends, and secured the loan of the show to Bendigo. In accounting for its attracting 75,000 visitors, Quinlan is quoted as saying she “educated the public” to visit regional Bendigo by “finding something that they want to see, making a day or weekend of it and building the regional economy as well as developing a perception that the art museum contributes to making Bendigo liveable for people seeking to relocate.":

...it proved that you could bring people to a regional centre...My photography exhibition, Sir Cecil Beaton Portraits – The World's Most Photographed ...from the National Portrait Gallery brought in about 11,000 or 12,000 people. So that's what photography can do. But fashion seemed to do much more and it brought in many more women. And our demographic is so much about women; I'm not quite sure why.

Fashion-oriented exhibitions Quinlan curated at Bendigo included:

- 2009: The Golden Age of Couture: Paris and London 1947–1957, from the V&A
- 2011: The White Wedding Dress: 200 Years of Wedding Fashion
- 2012: Grace Kelly: Style Icon
- 2014: Genius and Ambition: The Royal Academy of Arts, London 1768–1918, with works by Australian artists trained and associated with the RA: Nicholas Chevalier, Tom Roberts, John Longstaff, Rupert Bunny, Arthur Streeton, E Phillips Fox, Margaret Preston, Agnes Goodsir and William Dobell
- 2014: Undressed: 350 years of fashion in underwear, in association with the V&A
- 2014 The Body Beautiful in Ancient Greece, in collaboration with the British Museum
- 2016: Bendigo Art Gallery and Twentieth Century Fox presents Marilyn Monroe (attracted attendance of 142,000)
- 2019: Tudors to Windsors, British Royal family portraits from the National Portrait Gallery, London

During her tenure Quinlan successfully bid for funding for major redevelopments of the Bendigo Art Gallery in 2001, and for major works completed in 2014 she had secured $8.5m. In 2015 Bendigo Art Gallery hosted the Fifth National Public Galleries Summit, in which Karen Quinlan called for a national body to support and advocate for public art galleries.

While directing the Gallery, Quinlan was made professor of practice and director of the La Trobe Art Institute situated opposite Bendigo Art Gallery managed by La Trobe University which has a regional campus in that city.

== Director, National Portrait Gallery, 2018–2022 ==
In September 2018, Quinlan was appointed director of the National Portrait Gallery, Canberra, with effect from December 2018, joining during its major building rectification works and then shepherding it through the global pandemic by introducing online exhibitions and increasing online access to the collections, which continue to consolidate the Gallery's national presence. On commencement she proposed to "continue to collect works that symbolise the breadth and depth of Australian life," and introduced Darling Portrait Prize.

Again she secured international exhibitions, In 2020 The Gallery was only Australian venue for Love Stories: Works from the National Portrait Gallery, London, representations of famous relationships in paintings and photographs by Lucian Freud, Annie Leibovitz and Joshua Reynolds, of such subjects as John Lennon and Yoko Ono, Ted Hughes and Sylvia Plath, and Bob Hawke and Blanche d'Alpuget. It was held over 20 June–27 September, before it traveled to the United States. The Monthly reported Quinlan being excited "to build on that connection with the NPG in London," and keen to expand "the concept of portraiture for local audiences. I want to look at different ways portraiture manifests itself other than painting and photography...ensuring we are covering all stories and going into spaces we should be – excellence in terms of human endeavour, and great narratives."

On her departure in August 2022, National Portrait Gallery Chair Penny Fowler praised her efforts:

Karen has steered the NPG through a period of change and renewed ambition since she took on the role of Director four years ago. Her big-picture vision has had a marked impact on the gallery’s national profile, access and visitation. Karen is leaving the NPG in great shape. The recent international exhibition Shakespeare to Winehouse from the National Portrait Gallery in London is the most successful ticketed exhibition ever staged at the gallery. Recently launched exhibitions, including the Darling Portrait Prize for Painting and the popular, long-running National Photographic Portrait Prize, will be followed in October by Who Are You: Australian Portraiture, a collaboration between the NPG and the National Gallery of Victoria, one of the most comprehensive explorations of Australian identity and the portraiture genre.

== Chief Executive Officer, Arts Centre Melbourne, 2022 ==
In August 2022 Quinlan was appointed chief executive of Arts Centre Melbourne on a five-year contract, with the new role starting on 3 October 2022. Federal Minister for the Arts, Tony Burke MP acknowledged that “Karen Quinlan has been a fantastic Director of the National Portrait Gallery and I know she’ll be just as effective at Arts Centre Melbourne," although the recruitment was unexpected at a point when the centre's theatre was to be shut down for some years for refurbishment of its precinct.

In December 2025 it was announced by Victorian Arts Minister Colin Brooks, that the State Theatre would "reopen in October 2026, six months ahead of schedule," and be renamed Ian Potter State Theatre after the major donor for the project. Quinlan, commenting on the project, said: "This is a conservation project in many ways. We’re not just trying to make good, we're actually taking it back to what it originally was, with respect," remarking that as it is "one of the state's great assets, it's important that we ensure our civic buildings evolve over time … to ensure our cultural institutions stay fit for purpose".

Undaunted, Quinlan remarked that "we're more than an hall for hire," but announced plans to concentrate on showcasing the Australian Performing Arts Collection, an archive of 850,000 item that the Centre has been augmenting since 1975, before the building opened in 1982. In 2025, the collection's 50th year, Quinlan has housed it in a new dedicated and expanded display in Hamer Hall, in space formerly occupied by restaurant 'Fatto', with room for conservation, photography and curatorial studios.

As Quinlan recalls: "The conversation started, really, at the very beginning with my first interview for the job... was very aware of the collection, and also knew I would do something with it," having known "that it was not getting the attention that it should have," and is keen to make loans from it to other Australian institutions. She announced plans to host two exhibitions a year, usually from the considerable collection, and highlighting the narratives behind the objects, but the first, running 11 December 2025 – 26 April 2026, was DIVA from London’s Victoria and Albert Museum (V&A), which its curator Kate Bailey described as "a story of performers who have challenged the status quo”. Additional content was loaned from Auckland Museum, and from the Melbourne collection were items related to Dame Nellie Melba, Kylie Minogue, Olivia Newton-John, and Reuben Kaye; as Quinlan is quoted as saying: it was “a no-brainer for our first show. It is a deeply thoughtful and exciting exploration of the concept of the diva”.

== Offices held ==
- Trustee of the State Library of Victoria
- Board Member and former chair of the Public Galleries Association of Victoria
- Board member of the Victorian Foundation of Living Australian Artists, for the National Gallery of Victoria.

== Honours ==
Quinlan was made a Member of the Order of Australia in the 2019 Australia Day Honours list, "for her significant service to the visual arts and to higher education".

== Publications ==
- Quinlan, Karen (1984). Thea Proctor - an appraisal (Thesis. B.Ed. (Arts and Crafts) ed.). Melbourne: Melbourne State College.
- Quinlan, Karen (1998). In a picture land over the sea: Agnes Goodsir 1864-1939. Bendigo, Vic.: Bendigo Art Gallery. ISBN 9780949215161.
- Quinlan, Karen (2001). "Edwin Roper Loftus Stocqueler". In Stannage, Charles Thomas (ed.). Gold and civilisation. Canberra, ACT: Art Exhibitions Australia and National Museum of Australia. p. 67. ISBN 9781875460120.
- Quinlan, Karen (2001). "Edwin Stocqueler". Meanjin. 60 (4). University of Melbourne.
- Quinlan, Karen; Bell, Anonda (2011). Unearthed: A Bendigo Art Gallery Experimental Project. Bendigo, Vic.: Bendigo Art Gallery. ISBN 9780949215321.
- Quinlan, Karen; Brimacombe, Ruth; Long, Jenny (2002). "Introduction". In Rowan, Dana (ed.). A primrose from England : 19th century narratives from the collection of the Bendigo Art Gallery. Bendigo Art Gallery. ISBN 9780949215352.
- Quinlan, Karen; Day, Charlotte (2004). The ideal and the real. Bendigo, Vic.: Bendigo Art Gallery. ISBN 9780949215406.
- Quinlan, Karen (2004). Bendigo Art Gallery : selected works. Bendigo, Vic.: Bendigo Art Gallery. ISBN 9780949215277.
- Quinlan, Karen (2004). The Arthur Guy Memorial Painting Prize 2005: $50,000 acquisitive prize. Bendigo, Vic: Bendigo Art Gallery. ISBN 9780949215413.
- Quinlan, Karen (2006). Decade acquisitions 1996-2006. Bendigo, Vic: Bendigo Art Gallery. ISBN 9780949215468.
- Quinlan, Karen; Bendigo Art Gallery (2007). The Long Weekend: Australian Artists in France 1918-1939. Bendigo, Vic.: Bendigo Art Gallery. ISBN 9780949215482.
- Quinlan, Karen; Stuchbery, David (2008). Gift of Rod Fyffe: Australian ceramics from 1980s to the present (Catalogue ed.). Bendigo, Vic: Bendigo Art Gallery. ISBN 9780949215505.
- Clabburn, Anna; Quinlan, Karen (2010). Looking for faeries : the Victorian tradition (catalogue for exhibition held at Bendigo Art Gallery 16 October–28 November 2010 ed.). Bendigo Art Gallery. ISBN 9780949215598.
- Bruce, Sandra; Quinlan, Karen; Hill, Ian (2010). Naming Bendigo: Evolution of a City's Identity 1836-1891. Bendigo, Vic.: Bendigo Art Gallery and Post Office Gallery. ISBN 9780949215611.
- Quinlan, Karen; Curtin, Tansy (2011). The Australian aesthetic: wedding dress 1820-2011. Bendigo, Vic.: Bendigo Art Gallery.
- Needham, Clare; Quinlan; Karen (2012). Childhood : growing up in Bendigo. Bendigo Art Gallery.
- Quinlan, Karen; Fitzgibbon, Leanne; Jones, Kevin Leslie; Johnson, Christina M. (2013). Modern love: fashion visionaries from the FIDM LA. Bendigo, Vic.: Bendigo Art Gallery. ISBN 9780949215741.
- Curtin, Tansy; Quinlan, Karen; Stevens, MaryAnne (2014). Genius and ambition: the Royal Academy of Arts, London, 1768-1918. Bendigo: Bendigo Art Gallery and Royal Academy of Arts. ISBN 978-1-907533-68-6.
- Curtin, Tansy; Gillett, Susan; Quinlan, Karen (2016). Bendigo Art Gallery and Twentieth Century Fox present Marilyn Monroe. Bendigo Art Gallery. ISBN 9780949215826.
- Quinlan, Karen (2021). Living Memory National photographic portrait prize 2021 (Catalogue of an exhibition held at the National Portrait Gallery, Canberra, 31 July-7 November 2021 ed.). Canberra: National Portrait Gallery. ISBN 9780995397521.
