= Frank van Straten =

Australian historian (1936–2024)

- Born: Frank Van Straten; 14 May 1936; London, England
- Died: 19 April 2024 (aged 87)

Frank Van Straten AM (14 May 1936 – 19 April 2024) was a noted Australian performing arts historian and author.

He arrived in Melbourne in 1940 aged four with his parents, Leon, an English bandleader, who had met his wife Evelyn in Melbourne on a tour in 1925. Frank took his early love of theatre into a career in advertising, television production, and record marketing.

He applied successfully in 1979 for the job as the first archivist of the Performing Arts Museum (now Australian Performing Arts Collection), at the Arts Centre Melbourne, and became its director from 1984 until 1993. During that time, as the only specialised collection of its kind in the country, the collection grew enormously, and formed the basis for the many exhibitions held in a dedicated space in the theatres building.

Between 1986 and 2001, he researched and presented ABC Local Radio's Nostalgia segment, broadcast on Melbourne's 774 and the ABC Victorian Regional Network.

In 2001, Van Straten acted as the Historical Consultant for Graeme Murphy's 'dance musical' Tivoli, performed by the Sydney Dance Company, which premiered at the State Theatre, Arts Centre, Melbourne.

Van Straten served on the board of the National Theatre, Melbourne. He also served on the judging panels of the Green Room Awards and Helpmann Awards. He was a patron of the Cinema and Theatre Historical Society (Victoria), and a founding member and committee member of the Victoria Theatres Trust (now Theatre Heritage Australia).

In 1999, Van Straten received the Medal of the Order of Australia (OAM) in honour of his contributions to the performing arts in Australia.

In 2007, he was appointed Live Performance Australia's Official Historian.

Van Straten was made a Member of the Order of Australia (AM) in the 2017 Queen's Birthday Honours.

Since 2020, the Arts Centre Melbourne has been offering the Frank van Straten Fellowship, with funding of $15,000 awarded to conduct research using the collection.

Frank Van Straten died on 19 April 2024, at the age of 87. To commemorate the renowned theatre historian, archivist, author, radio presenter and devoted patron of the performing arts, a public memorial was held for Van Straten in the Playhouse of Arts Centre Melbourne on 16 July 2024 and was attended by hundreds.

== Bibliography ==
- Discovering puppets (South Melbourne : Performing Arts Museum, Victorian Arts Centre, 1981)
- Bourke Street on Saturday night : the memories of Charlie Fredricksen "the man outside Hoyts" (Melbourne : Performing Arts Museum, Victorian Arts Centre, 1983)
- National treasure : the story of Gertrude Johnson and the National Theatre (South Melbourne : Victoria Press, 1994)
- The Regent Theatre : Melbourne's palace of dreams (Melbourne : E.L.M. Publishing, 1996)
- Tivoli (South Melbourne : Lothian, 2003)
- Huge deal : the fortunes and follies of Hugh D. McIntosh (South Melbourne : Lothian Books, 2004)
- Florence Young and the golden years of Australian musical theatre (Mornington, Vic. : Beleura, 2009)
- Her Majesty's Pleasure : A Centenary Celebration for Adelaide's Theatre of the Stars (Adelaide : Wakefield Press, 2013)
