= Australian Music Vault =

Music museum in Melbourne, Australia

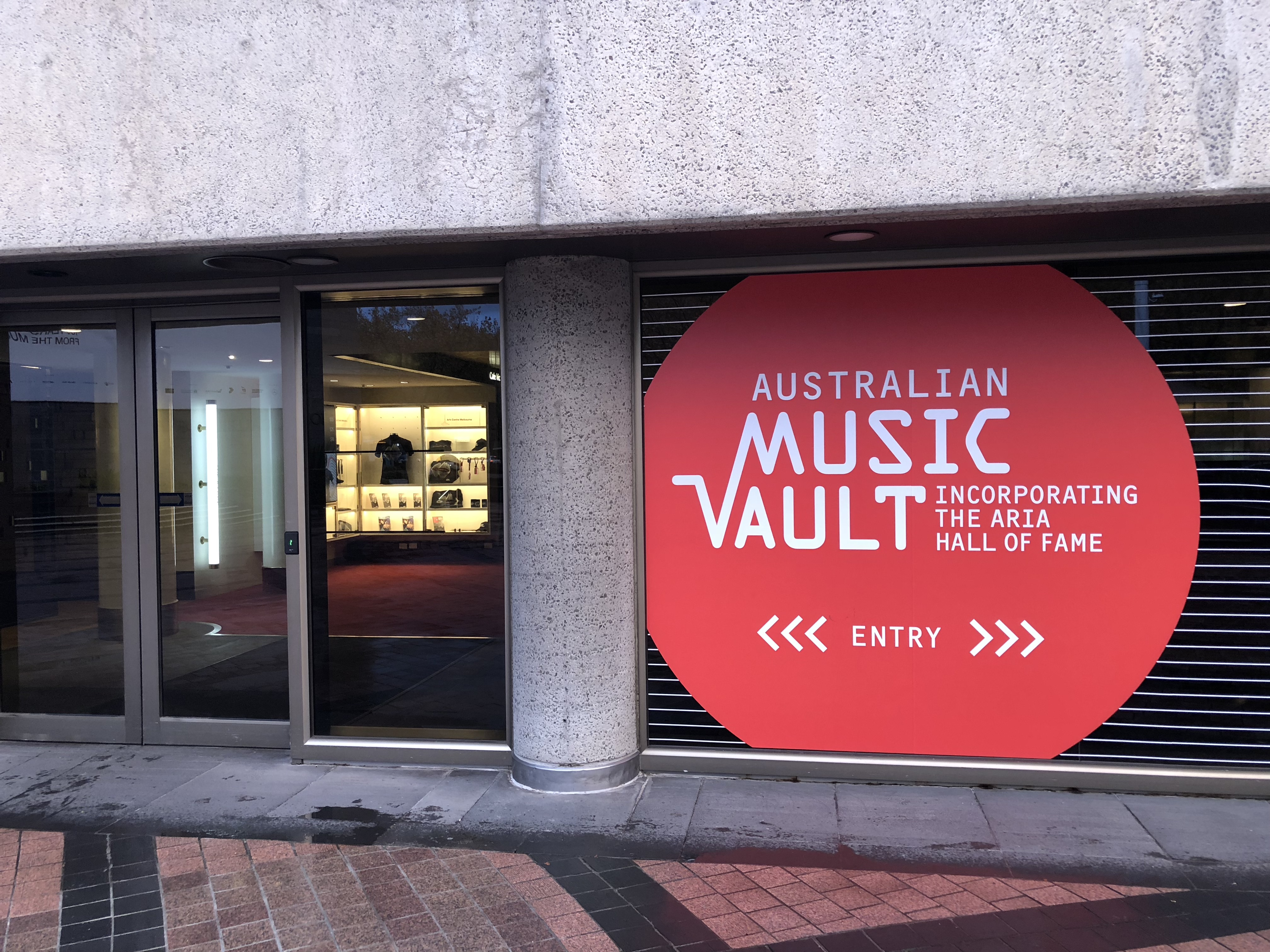
- Australian Music Vault entrance
- Established: 2017; 9 years ago
- Location: Arts Centre Melbourne, Melbourne, Australia
- Coordinates: 37°49′13″S 144°58′6″E
- Curator: Carolyn Laffan (2017-2024)
- Website: australianmusicvault.com.au
- -37.820278, 144.968333

The Australian Music Vault is a free permanent exhibition that showcases past and present Australian contemporary music.

It is located in the central Melbourne suburb of Southbank, within the Arts Centre Melbourne.

Australian Music Vault exhibits physical objects such as costumes, lyric books, and tour paraphernalia from the Arts Centre Melbourne's Australian Performing Arts Collection. Exhibits include material from artists such as Baker Boy, Mo’Ju, Missy Higgins, Chrissy Amphlett, AC/DC, Olivia Newton-John, Archie Roach, and Kylie Minogue, as well as interactive digital activities. Recorded interviews with musicians and key music industry promoters are also displayed.

It was developed by Arts Centre Melbourne in consultation with the music industry.

Patrons of the Australian Music Vault include Kylie Minogue, Tina Arena, Ian “Molly” Meldrum, Archie Roach and Michael Gudinski.

Founded in 2017, it reached 1 million visitors within two years of opening. It was Australia's first physical "hall of fame" for music.

It has been noted for their inclusion of a number of Indigenous performers such as Yothu Yindi, No Fixed Address, Archie Roach, and women artists including Chrissie Amphlett, Little Patti, Judith Durham and Ngaiire.

== Gallery ==
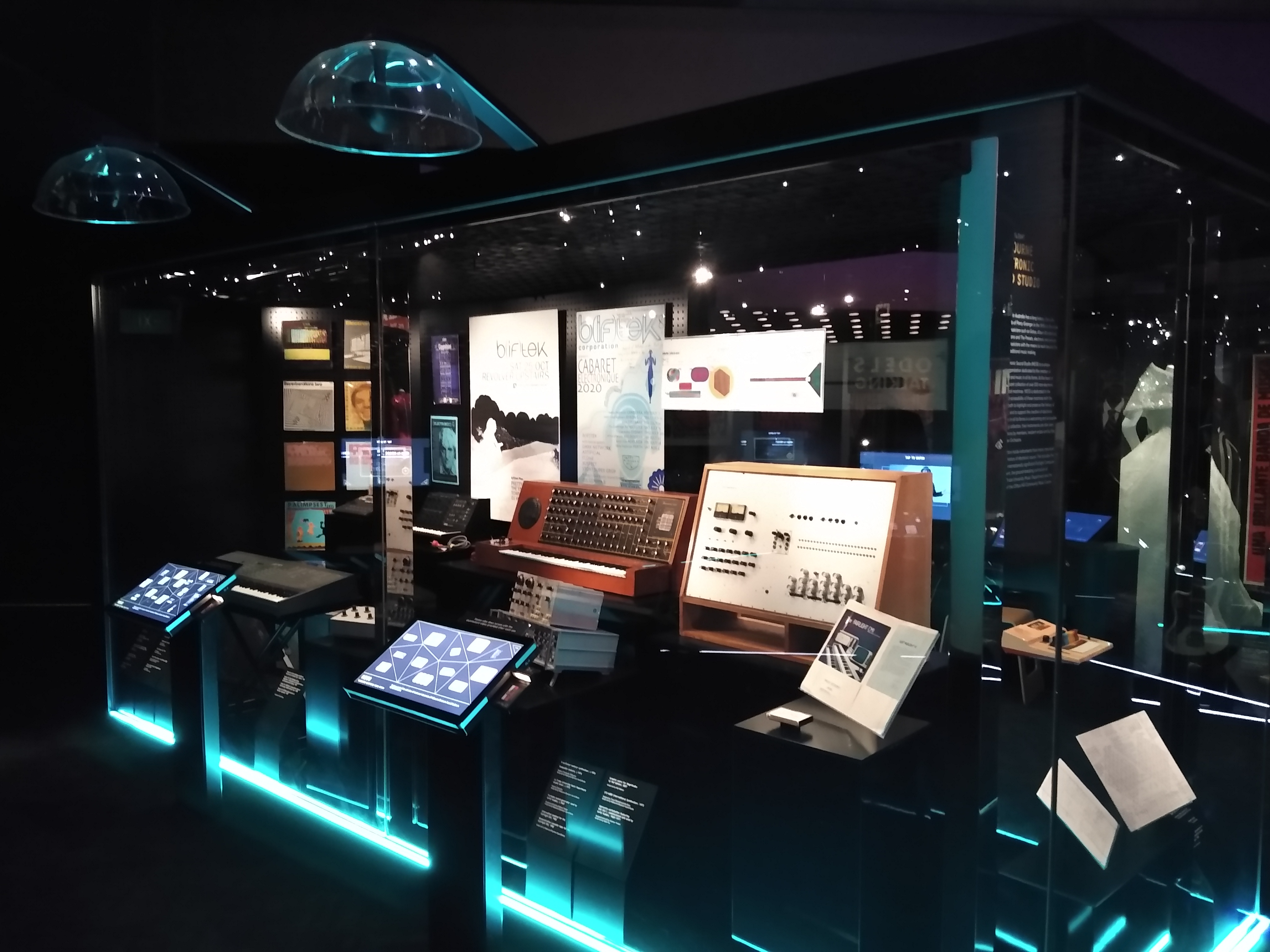
Synthesiser display at the Australian Music Vault May 2022

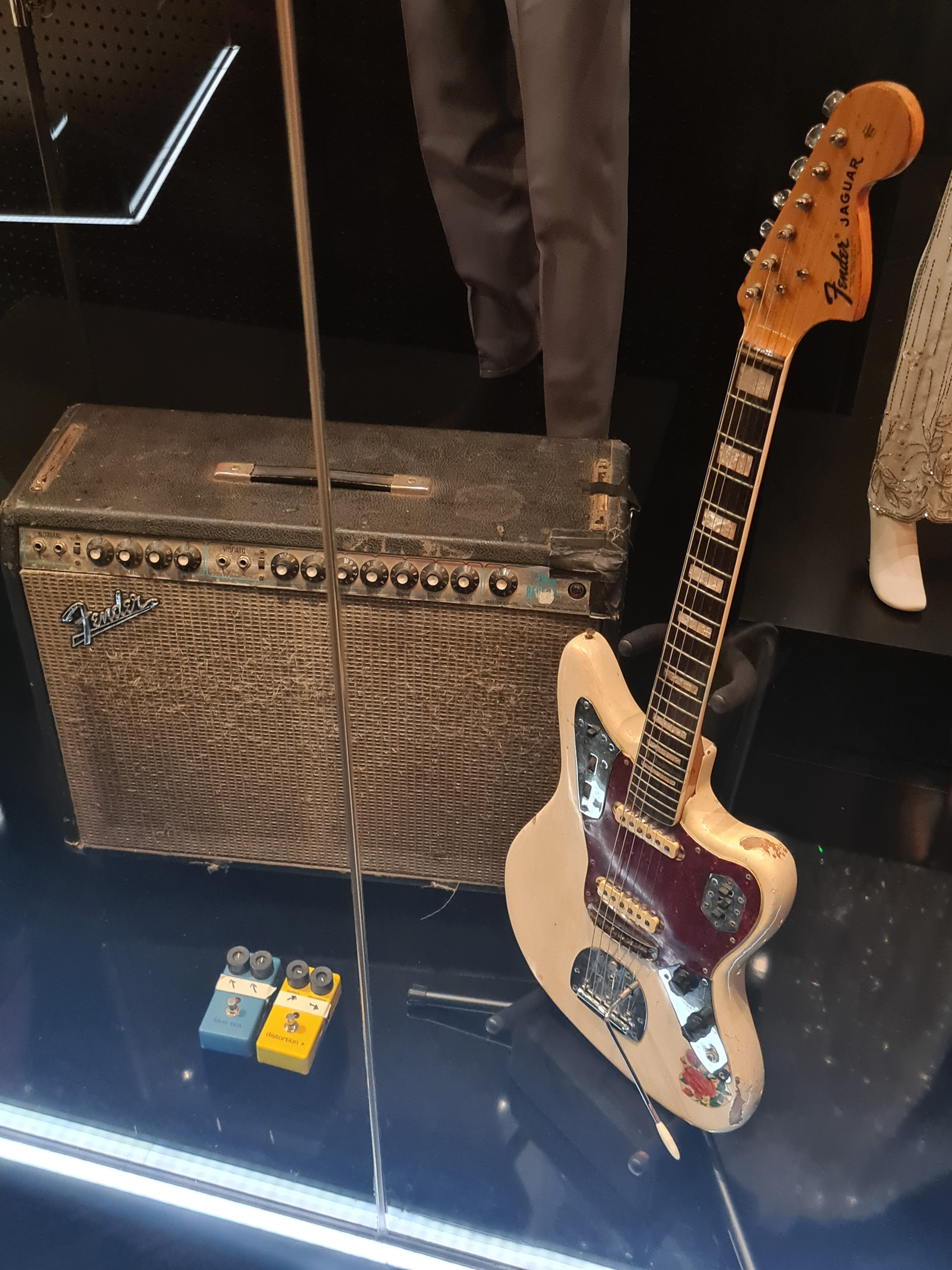
Rowland S Howard Guitar and Amp at the Australian Music Vault Oct 2024
