= Elsa Lewis =

Australian musician and vaudeville performer

Elsa Elizabeth Lewis (born c. 1903) was an Australian musician and vaudeville performer.

== Career ==
Elsa Lewis studied at the Melbourne Conservatorium of Music under Belgian violinist Gustave Walthers. She performed as a member of the Rhapsodie Quartette, with Dorothy Randle, Tasma Tieman, and Grace Funston. Then during the early 1920s performed at theatres around Australia including the grand opening of the Princess Theatre, Marryatville, South Australia on 24 November 1925, where she was billed as "Miss Elsa Lewis, the Gypsy Whistling Violinist".

Her performances as a whistling violinist took her to New Zealand. Back in Australia she joined the Fuller and Tivoli circuit and grew her popularity with audiences.

During the 1930s she left Australia to perform internationally, including entertaining Allied forces during World War II. She returned to Australia in 1946, after performing in England with Jack Hylton's band, having added singing lovebirds to her act who sat on her arms as she played violin.

== Personal life ==
Lewis was an only child. She grew up in Hampton, her father was Fred Lewis. Her mother was a well-known pianist.

On 13 October 1923 Elsa Lewis married Robert Bruce Scott, general manager of a machinery company, ten days after meeting each other. They were divorced in 1936 when Elsa left for England. By mid-1936 she had married Ron Macdonald, a Major in the Indian Army, who joined her in her vaudeville performances. They appeared together as The Granados, and Ron and Elsa Lewis.

== Gallery ==
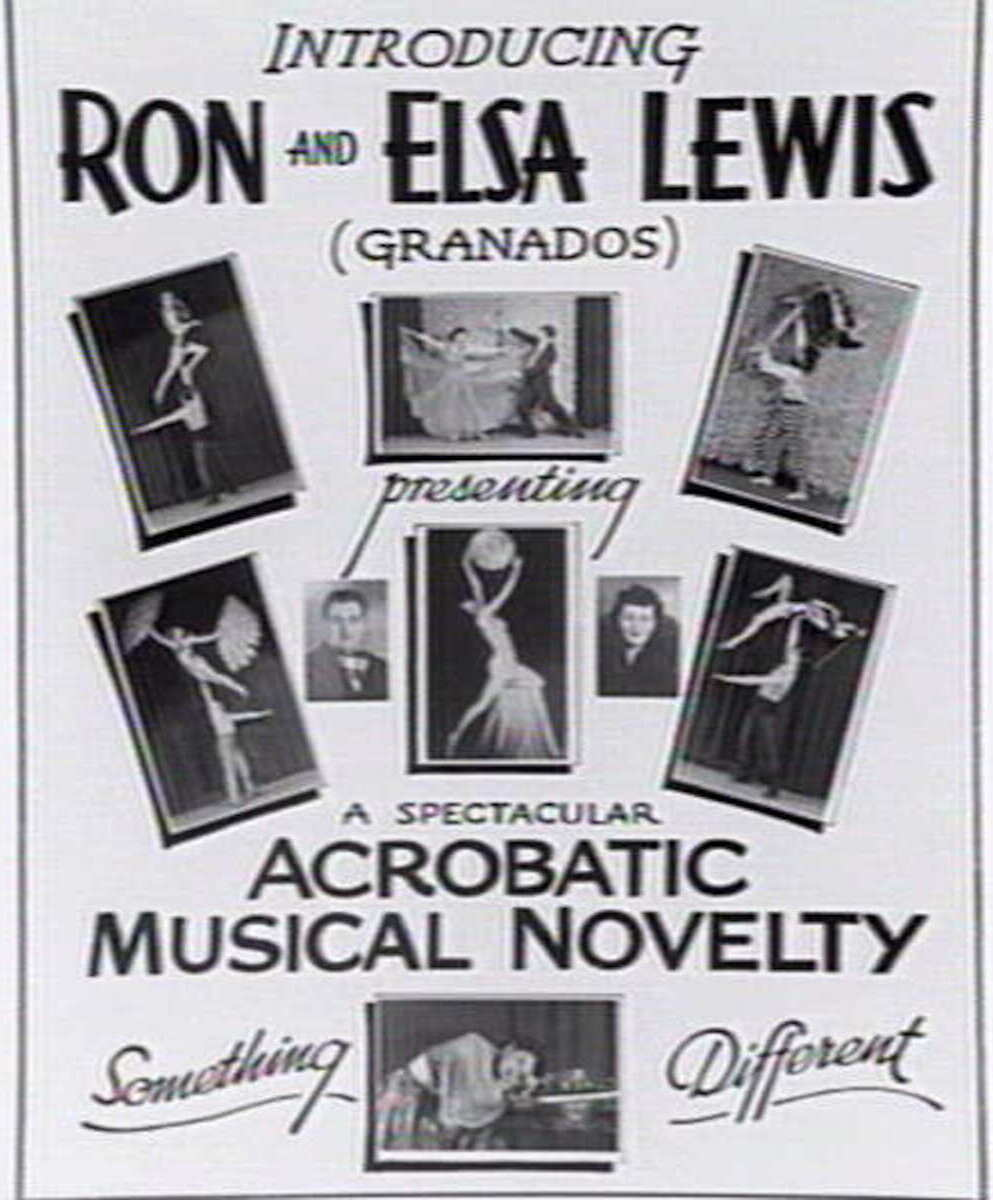
Advertising poster for acrobatic musical novelty show, starring Ron and Elsa Lewis c1938-1940.

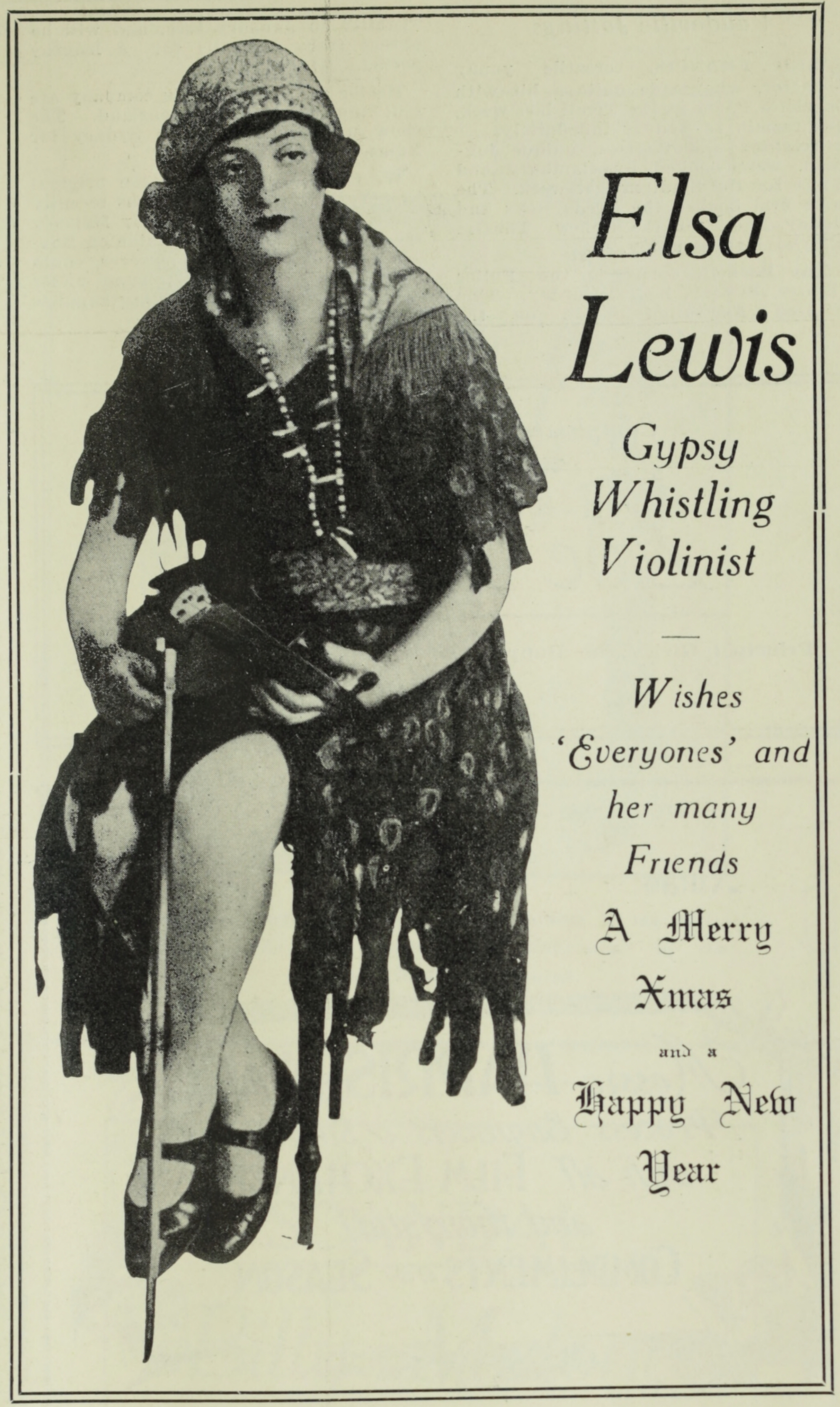
Elsa Lewis Christmas message 1924
