= Bendigo Art Gallery =

Coordinates: 36.757513°S 144.276967°E

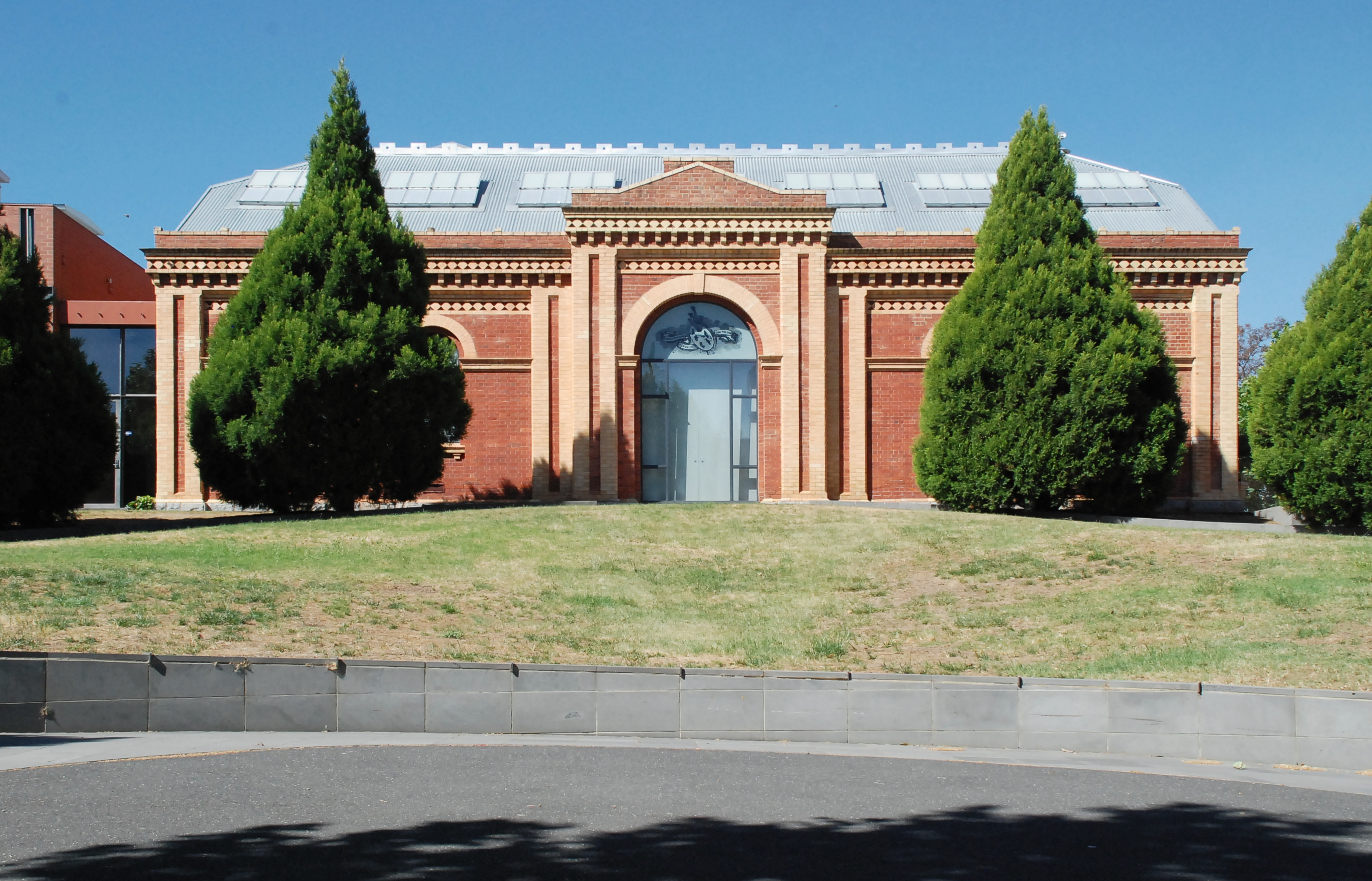
- Bendigo Art Gallery, Bolton Court seen from View Street
- Established: 1887
- Location: 42 View Street, Bendigo, Victoria, Australia
- Type: Art gallery
- Owner: City of Greater Bendigo
- Website: bendigoartgallery.com.au

Bendigo Art Gallery is an Australian art gallery located in Bendigo, Victoria. It is one of the oldest and largest regional art galleries. The gallery is owned and managed by the City of Greater Bendigo.

== History ==
The gallery was founded in 1887.

The gallery's collection was first housed in the former Bendigo Volunteer Rifle's room, converted into an exhibition space by Bendigo architect William Charles Vahland (1828–1915) in 1890 and renamed Bolton Court. In 1897 it was extended with Drury Court, designed by local architect William Beebe. In 1962 the gallery was again extended with office space and additional exhibition spaces, as well as a new entrance.

From 1998 to 2001 the gallery was refurbished and expanded with a new sculpture gallery designed by Fender Katsalidis Architects.

The gallery will be closed from December 2025 to early 2028 for an extensive $25 million redevelopment. Exhibitions will be held off-site during its closure.

== Description ==
Bendigo Art Gallery is one of Australia’s oldest and largest regional art galleries.

== Collection ==
The gallery's collection has a strong emphasis on British and European Continental 19th-century painting, with works by Ernest Waterlow and Pierre Puvis de Chavannes among others. Australian work from the 19th century onwards is also well represented, including Charles Conder and Arthur Streeton.

== Prizes ==
The Robert Jacks Drawing Prize is a former prize awarded by the gallery, named for Australian artist Robert Jacks.

As of 2024, the gallery offers two biennial art prizes:

=== Arthur Guy Memorial Painting Prize ===
The gallery hosts Australia's richest open painting prize, the Arthur Guy Memorial Painting Prize worth A$50,000, which was launched in 2003. It was then Australia's richest open painting prize, worth A$50,000. It was initiated by Allen Guy CBE in honour of his elder and only brother Arthur Guy (24 November 1914 – 14 February 1945), who died in World War II near Lae, Papua New Guinea, while serving with the RAAF. Arthur was educated at Camp Hill State School in Bendigo, and then at Ballarat Grammar School.

Prizewinners include:

- 2003: Stieg Persson
- 2005: Dale Frank
- 2007: Stephen Bush
- 2009: Jan Nelson
- 2011: Tim Johnson
- 2013: Chris Bond
- 2015: Guan Wei
- 2017: Margaret Loy Pula
- 2019: Jahnne Pasco-White
- 2021: Kirsty Budge
- 2023: Tuppy Ngintja Goodwin

=== Paul Guest Prize ===
The Paul Guest Prize is a non-acquisitive biennial art prize and exhibition focused on contemporary Australian drawing practice. It was founded by former Family Court judge and Olympic rower, Paul Guest OAM QC in 2010. It comprises a cash award of A$15,000.

Winners include:

- 2010: Belinda Fox
- 2012: Tom Nicholson
- 2014: Heather B. Swann
- 2016: Peter Grziwotz
- 2018: Laith McGrego
- 2020: Richard Lewer
- 2022: James Clayden

== People ==
Karen Quinlan was director of Bendigo Art Gallery from around 2000 to 2018, and curator for three years before that. She was also Professor of Practice at the La Trobe Art Institute at Bendigo. She took up the post of leading the National Portrait Gallery in Canberra in December 2018. During her tenure at Bendigo, Quinlan worked with international institutions to bring large exhibitions to Bendigo, which boosted the regional economy and encouraged cultural tourism. She was made a Member of the Order of Australia in the 2019 Australia Day Honours list, "for her significant service to the visual arts and to higher education".

== Logo ==
The gallery's logo is an image of Ettore Cadorin's statue Venus tying her sandals (1913). Cadorin was an Italian-born American, but was married to an Australian contralto, Erna Mueller, who trained at the Bendigo Conservatory. He sold the statue to the gallery after visiting it in 1913.

== Redevelopment ==
Bendigo Art Gallery is currently close from Monday 1 December 2025 to commence the major redevelopment. Although the building will be under construction, the Gallery’s creative program will continue to unfold across Bendigo.
