= Arts Centre Melbourne =

Performing arts centre in Victoria, Australia

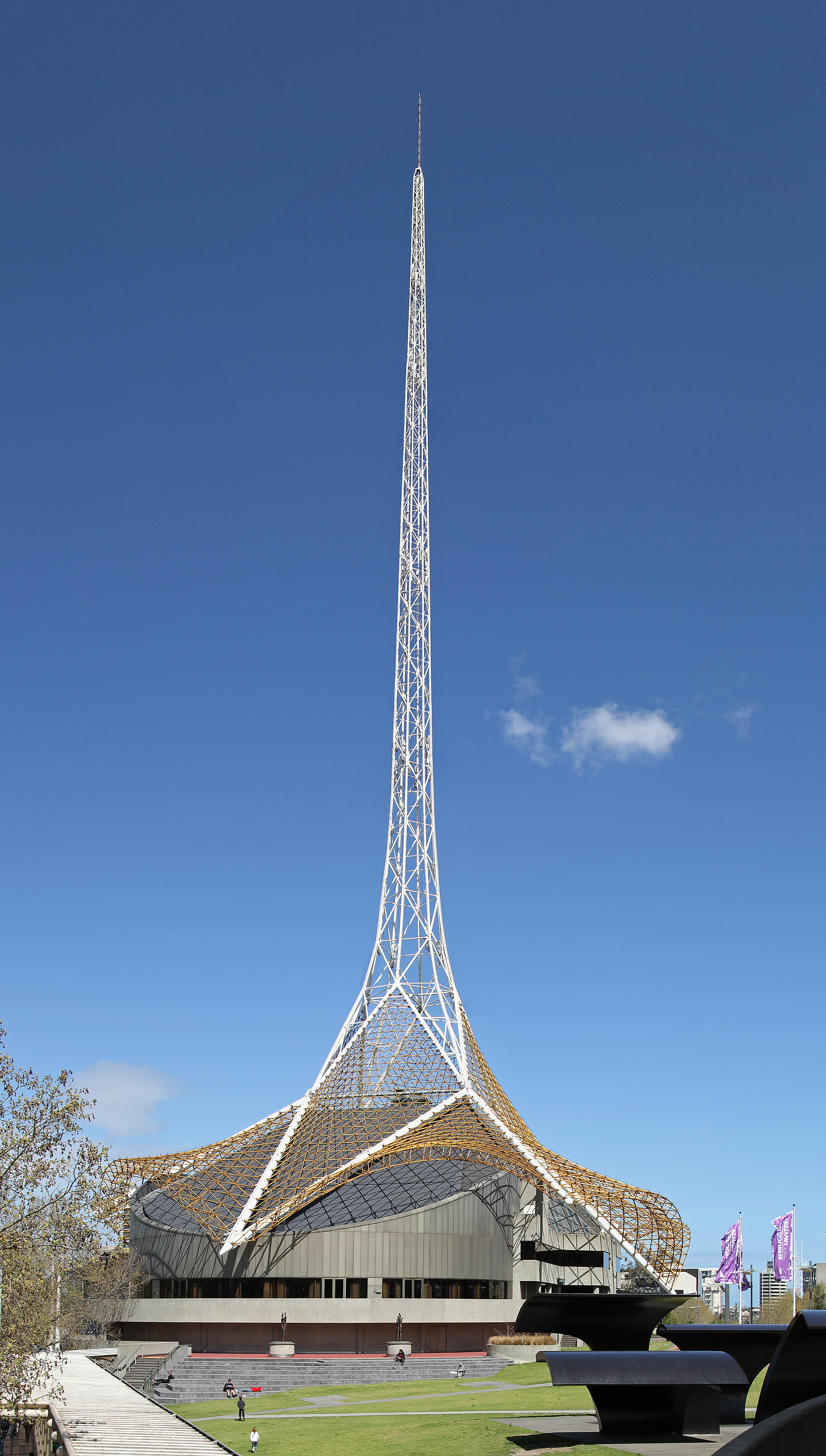
- Arts Centre Melbourne's spire
- Former names: Victorian Arts Centre

General information
- Type: Performing arts centre
- Location: Southbank, Victoria, Australia
- Coordinates: 37°49′13″S 144°58′6″E
- Construction started: 1973; 53 years ago
- Completed: 1984; 42 years ago
- Owner: Victorian Arts Centre Trust

Height
- Height: 162 m (531 ft) (was 115 m (377 ft) with original spire)

Design and construction
- Architects: Roy Grounds and Company
- Other designers: John Truscott

Other information
- Public transit: Flinders Street; Arts Precinct/St Kilda Rd (#14): 1, 3, 5, 6, 16, 64, 67, 72

Website
- www.artscentremelbourne.com.au

Victorian Heritage Register
- Official name: Victorian Arts Centre
- Type: State Registered Place
- Criteria: a, b, d, e, f, g, h
- Designated: 20 August 1982
- Reference no.: H1500
- Heritage Overlay number: HO760

Arts Centre Melbourne, originally known as the Victorian Arts Centre and briefly called the Arts Centre, is a performing arts centre consisting of a complex of theatres and concert halls in the Melbourne Arts Precinct, located in the central Melbourne suburb of Southbank in Victoria, Australia.

It was designed by architect Sir Roy Grounds, the masterplan for the complex (along with the National Gallery of Victoria) was approved in 1960 and construction began in 1973 following some delays. The complex opened in stages, with Hamer Hall opening in 1982 and the Theatres Building opening in 1984.

Arts Centre Melbourne is located by the Yarra River and along St Kilda Road, one of the city's main thoroughfares, and extends into the Melbourne Arts Precinct.

Major companies regularly performing include Opera Australia, The Australian Ballet, the Melbourne Theatre Company, The Production Company, Victorian Opera, Bell Shakespeare, Bangarra Dance Theatre and the Melbourne Symphony Orchestra. Arts Centre Melbourne also hosts many Australian and international performances and production companies.

Arts Centre Melbourne is listed on the Victorian Heritage Register.

== History ==
=== Background ===
Arts Centre Melbourne's site has long been associated with arts and entertainment; in the early 20th century it was occupied variously by a permanent circus venue, an amusement park, a cinema and a dance hall. The area was a popular venue featuring the Olympia Dancing Place, the Glaciarium Ice-Skating Rink, a Japanese tea house, Snowden Gardens, the Trocadero and the Princes Court with a miniature train and water-chute. The Wirth's Circus appeared in 1907 with a 5000-seat auditorium.

In the book A Place Across the River, Vicki Fairfax described the lot as a "oddly shaped piece of land" considered a sacred public spot by the locals.

During World War II there was a push to establish a new home for the National Gallery of Victoria, along with a state theatre, on the site. The construction was difficult due to the triangular parcel of land the construction was planned on. However, by the 1960s, all the entertainment had left and the lot had turned into an improvised parking for city workers.

=== Plans and construction (1960s–1970s) ===
After many years of discussion, Roy Grounds was chosen as the architect, and his master plan of a gallery and an adjacent theatre under a tall copper spire was approved in 1960. One of the main challenges of the construction was to dry up and retain the waters out of the base, as the construction went as deep as 7 m (23 ft) below water levels. The original spire envisaged by Grounds was 115 m (377 ft) tall, and because of its complexity was one of the first structures in Australia to rely on computer-aided-design (CAD).

The gallery was completed in 1968, with the theatres to be built in a second stage.

Responsibility for the project lay with the building committee, established in 1956 and chaired by Kenneth Myer from 1965 to 1989. For twenty-five years the committee was a consistent force in the completion of the complex. Actor and film director George Fairfax, having joined the project in 1972, was appointed the first general manager of the building committee and then the trust, a position he held until 1989. As a result, Fairfax played an influential role in administration of Arts Centre Melbourne's development.

In the early 1970s, due to the expansion of the size of both the theatre and the concert hall required, the addition of a smaller second theatre, and to accommodate difficulties associated with the geology of the site, Roy Grounds completely redesigned the project. The concert hall was separated out and placed in the riverbank, and the theatres building expanded above ground, with a latticework spire above.

Work began on the theatre site in 1973, but excavations were not completed until 1978, two years later than expected. Work began on the concert hall site in 1976. During the first phase of the project from 1972 until 1979 responsibility was with Rupert Hamer as Minister for the Arts (and premier) and during the main construction phase from 1979 to 1982 with Norman Lacy as Minister for the Arts (and Minister of Educational Services). After significant public controversy, political inquiry and financial reassessment, the spire was completed by the Minister for the Arts, Norman Lacy, installing the lightning conductor rod at its pinnacle on 20 October 1981.

Once the buildings were nearly complete, and with the death of Grounds in 1981, Academy Award-winning expatriate set designer John Truscott, was employed to decorate the interiors. His work was constrained only by a requirement to leave elements already constructed, such as Ground's faceted cave-like concert hall interior, to which he applied mineral finishes, and his steel mesh draped ceiling in the State Theatre, to which he added perforated brass balls.

During his tenure, Arts Minister Norman Lacy was constantly called on to defend the Victorian Arts Centre Trust and its construction program during some highly charged public debates in the parliament. He had to defend the acoustics, the design of the spire, the rejection of the proposed changes to the Concert Hall interiors, the BASS ticketing system of the project, as well as its delays and cost over runs.

The Victorian Arts Centre's management and administration was set up under the Victorian Arts Centre Act 1979 (No. 9354) introduced into the Victorian parliament by Minister for the Arts, Norman Lacy. The trustees were appointed by the Governor in Council, on the recommendation of the minister. The trust were given responsibility for the operation and programming of the publicly owned performing arts spaces that make up the Victorian Arts Centre – the Theatres Building beneath the Spire, Hamer Hall and the Sidney Myer Music Bowl.

=== Redevelopment (1981) ===
Soon after the legislation to establish the trust was passed, Norman Lacy and George Fairfax undertook a study trip to North America and Europe to assess administrative arrangements, educational programs and community initiatives at major performing arts centres in Los Angeles, San Francisco, New York, Washington, Toronto, Ottawa, London and Paris. The result was the development of Arts Centre Melbourne's management structure during 1981 and a suite of opening and on-going initiatives.

The Concert Hall opened in November 1982, while substantial work remained to be done on the Theatres site. The rest of Arts Centre Melbourne was opened progressively in 1984, with the Theatres building officially opened in October that year. This signified the completion of one of the largest public works projects in Victorian history, which had been undertaken over a period of almost twenty-five years.

Arts Centre Melbourne is unusual in that its theatres and concert hall are built largely underground. Hamer Hall, situated closest to the river, was initially planned to be almost entirely underground, thus providing a huge open vista between the theatre spire, the river and Flinders Street railway station. However, construction problems with the foundations, including water seepage, meant the structure had to be raised to three storeys above ground.

Similarly, budget constraints meant that Grounds' design for the Theatres Building, which included a copper-clad spire, were shelved, and a shortened un-clad design was substituted. This was eventually replaced with the current "full-height" un-clad spire.

By the mid-1990s, signs of deterioration became apparent on the upper spire structure and Arts Centre Melbourne's Trust decided to replace the spire. The new spire was completed in 1996, and reaches 162 m (531 ft), though still based on Grounds' original design. The spire is illuminated with some 6,600 m (21,700 ft) of optic fibre tubing, 150 m (490 ft) of neon tubing on the mast and 14,000 incandescent lamps on the spire's skirt. The metal webbing of the spire was inspired by the billowing of a ballerina's tutu and the Eiffel Tower.

=== 2000s ===
In early 2008, a wedge-tailed eagle and peregrine falcon were utilised to deter groups of sulphur-crested cockatoos from damaging the spire's electrical fittings and thimble-sized lights.

On 1 January 2012 the spire was accidentally set afire by New Year's Eve fireworks. Two sides of the structure were set ablaze by fireworks that apparently discharged improperly, causing flaming debris to fall to the ground. The fire burned for about forty minutes, causing only cosmetic damage to the tower.

In February 2016, two protesters climbed the spire of the centre to protest Nauru detention centre deportations. They stayed on top of the spire for 11 hours, and disrupted a programmed light show. They unfurled a banner reading #letthemstay. They were not arrested.

As of 2022 there are plans for a major upgrade of the theatre, as part of the $1.7 billion Melbourne Arts Precinct Transformation project.

== Building and venues ==
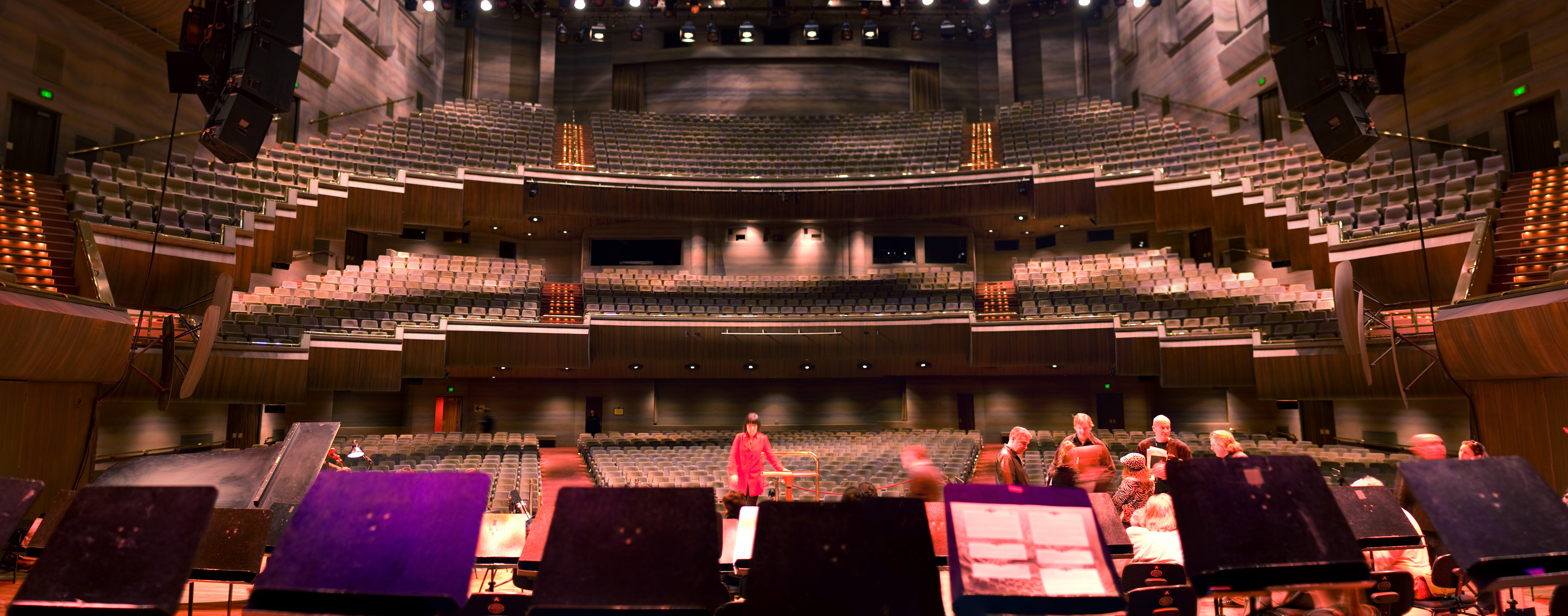
Interior of Hamer Hall prior to the 2010–2012 redevelopment

Arts Centre Melbourne features a large steel spire with a wrap-around base. It is a complex of distinct venues. Hamer Hall is a separate building and the largest of the venues. The other venues (the State Theatre, Playhouse, Fairfax Studio and The Show Room) are housed in the Theatres Building (under the spire).

Hamer Hall Hamer Hall (formerly the Melbourne Concert Hall) is a 2,466-seat concert hall – the largest venue in Arts Centre Melbourne's complex, used for orchestra and contemporary music performances. It was opened in 1982 and was later renamed Hamer Hall in honour of Sir Rupert Hamer (the 39th Premier of Victoria) shortly after his death in 2004.

State Theatre The State Theatre is located in the Theatres Building of Arts Centre Melbourne under the spire, and is a 2,079-seat theatre used for opera, ballet and theatre performances. It was opened in 1984, and has one of the largest stages in the World.

Playhouse The Playhouse is also located in the Theatres Building of Arts Centre Melbourne and is an 884-seat theatre used for plays and dance performances. It was also opened in 1984. The premiere production was the Melbourne Theatre Company's staging of Euripides' Medea, starring Zoe Caldwell and Patricia Kennedy.

Fairfax Studio The Fairfax Studio is also located in the Theatres Building of Arts Centre Melbourne and is a 376-seat theatre. It was also opened in 1984.

The Show Room The Show Room is located between the Playhouse and Fairfax Studio within the Theatres Building and is an intimate 150-seat studio theatre. It was opened in 2024.

Galleries Arts Centre Melbourne also houses dedicated gallery spaces including newly opened Australian Music Vault (formally Gallery 1 and the George Adams Gallery) on Level 6 (Ground level), Gallery 2 on Level 7, the St Kilda Road Foyer Gallery and the Smorgon Family Plaza, whose walls and central areas are used for exhibitions, in the Theatres Building.

The Sidney Myer Music Bowl, situated in nearby Kings Domain, is an outdoor arena also managed by Arts Centre Melbourne. It seats 12,000 on the lawn area and 2,150 in reserved seating, and is used for music concerts.

== Australian Performing Arts Collection ==
The Australian Performing Arts Collection at Arts Centre Melbourne is the foremost and largest specialist performing arts collection in Australia, with over 510,000 items relating to the history of circus, dance, music, opera and theatre in Australia and of Australian performers overseas. Many of Australia's national performing arts companies are represented in the archives.

== Kenneth Myer Medallion for the Performing Arts ==
The Arts Centre presented the Kenneth Myer Medallion for the Performing Arts between 1994 and 2010.

== People ==
In August 2022 Karen Louise Quinlan AM was appointed chief executive of Arts Centre Melbourne, with the new role starting on 3 October 2022.

After 18 years of director of Bendigo Art Gallery, Quinlan had headed the National Portrait Gallery in Canberra from December 2018 until September 2022. At the time of her appointment to NPGA, Quinlan was also Professor of Practice at the La Trobe Art Institute at Bendigo. Quinlan was made a Member of the Order of Australia in the 2019 Australia Day Honours list, "For significant service to the visual arts as an administrator and gallery curator, and to higher education".

== See also ==
- List of concert halls
