= Australian Performing Arts Collection =

Australian museum collection

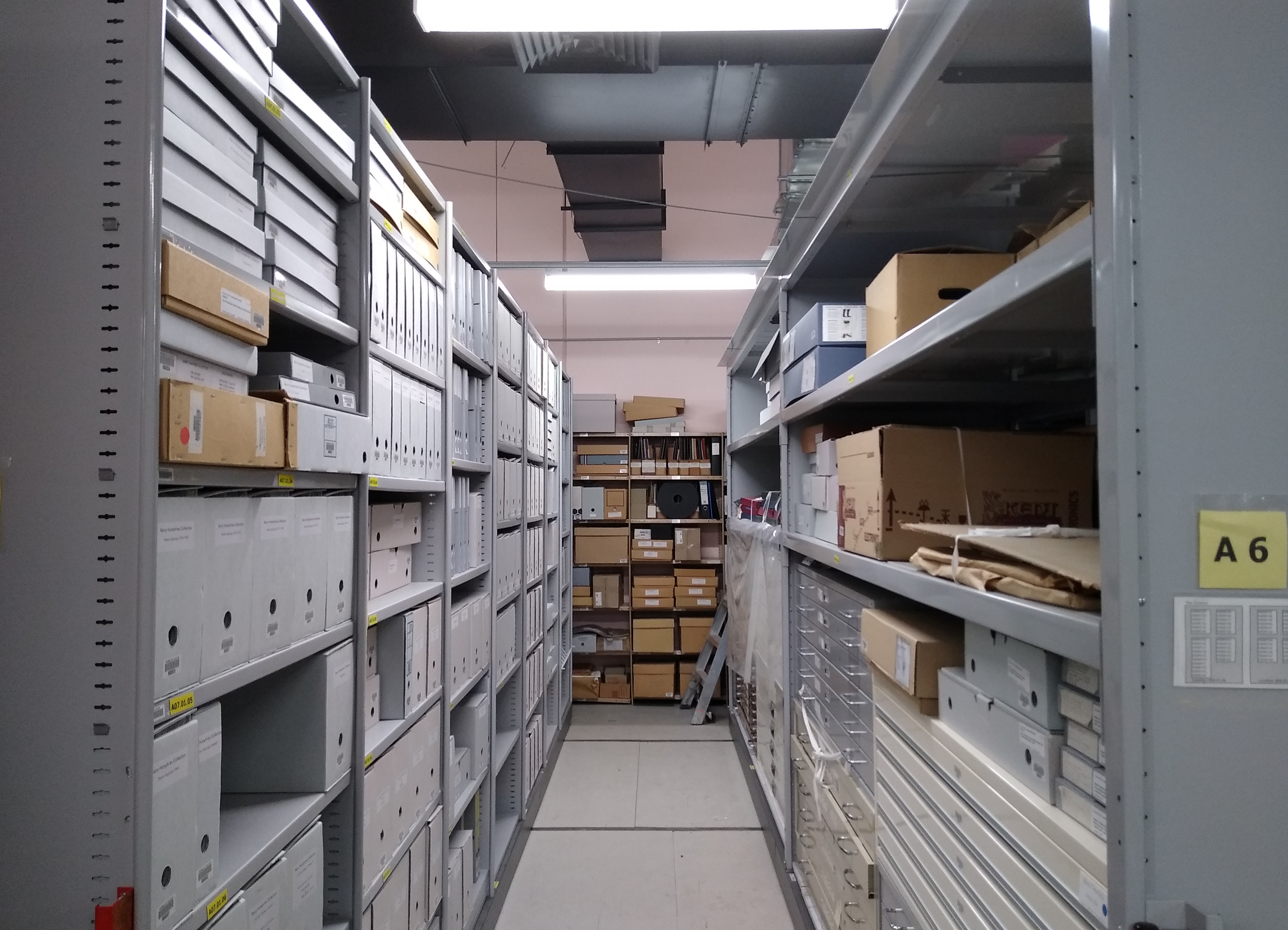
- The APAC collection in storage
- Former name: Performing Arts Museum
- Location: Arts Centre Melbourne, Melbourne, Victoria, Australia
- Coordinates: 37°49′13″S 144°58′6″E
- Website: www.artscentremelbourne.com.au/exhibitions-collections/australian-performing-arts-collection
- -37.820278, 144.968333

The Australian Performing Arts Collection at Arts Centre Melbourne, formerly known as Performing Arts Museum (PAM), is the largest specialist performing arts collection in Australia, with over 780,000 items relating to the history of circus, dance, music, opera and theatre in Australia and of Australian performers overseas.

== History ==
Established in 1975, the collection was originally known as Performing Arts Museum (PAM) and was planned as part of the Melbourne Arts Centre while that building was being complete.

Roy Grounds had been appointed to design the Melbourne Arts Centre in 1959, and although he is said to have intended for a performing arts museum to be part of the building, he did not include a space for one in his original design brief. Instead, he had included a series of display cabinets around the building's foyers which would house collections.

In 1975, a committee was set up to advise on the sources and types of material to be included in PAM. At the time, the museum's name had not been finalised, and suggestions included Museum of the Performing Arts, Stage Museum, or Performing Arts Museum, with the later being decided upon in 1977.

The Performing Arts Museum was officially launched by Premier Sir Rupert Hamer on 30 October 1978 with a display held at the nearby National Gallery of Victoria (NGV), where George Pusak, managing director of Mobil Oil, gave a cheque of $300,000 towards the museum's establishment.

The NGV also hosted PAM's first major exhibition in 1981, before PAM officially opened in 1982 with early exhibitions on Dame Nellie Melba and Bourke Street. In its first year the museum had 47,000 visitors, four major exhibitions, six smaller exhibitions, and also showed exhibits in the buildings foyer. The Director in the first decade (1984-93) was noted theatre historian Frank van Straten, who had begun as Archivist in 1979.

Now officially known as the Australian Performing Arts Collection (APAC), the collection continues to be expanded, and exhibitions created by or featuring collections from APAC have toured nationally and internationally.

In August 2022, incoming Melbourne Arts Centre CEO Karen Quinlan announced plans to further showcase the Australian Performing Arts Collection and loan the collection to other Australian institutions. In 2025, the collection's 50th year, Quinlan has housed it in a new dedicated display space in Hamer Hall, formerly occupied by restaurant Fatto, with room for conservation and photography labs, and a curatorial studio. As Quinlan recalls: "The conversation started, really, at the very beginning with my first interview for the job... was very aware of the collection, and also knew I would do something with it," having known "that it was not getting the attention that it should have," and is keen to make loans from it to other Australian institutions.

In December 2025 it was announced by Victorian Arts Minister Colin Brooks, that the State Theatre would "reopen in October 2026, six months ahead of schedule," and be renamed Ian Potter State Theatre after the major donor for the project. Quinlan, commenting on the project, said: "This is a conservation project in many ways. We’re not just trying to make good, we're actually taking it back to what it originally was, with respect," remarking that as it is "one of the state's great assets, it's important that we ensure our civic buildings evolve over time … to ensure our cultural institutions stay fit for purpose".

== Exhibitions ==
The Australian Performing Arts Collection held exhibitions in the galleries throughout Arts Centre Melbourne (Gallery 1, Gallery 2, St Kilda Road Foyer Gallery and Smorgon Family Plaza). Exhibitions subjects have included AC/DC, Kylie Minogue, Geoffrey Rush, Peter Allen, and Nick Cave and have toured nationally and internationally. Since 2017, they have run the Australian Music Vault, a permanent exhibition and collaboration with the music industry.

Quinlan plans to host two exhibitions a year in the expanded space opened in 2025, usually from the considerable collection, and highlighting the narratives behind the objects, but her first, in December 2025, was DIVA from London’s Victoria and Albert Museum (V&A) and the Auckland Museum, with added content from Melbourne collection from Dame Nellie Melba, Kylie Minogue, Olivia Newton-John, Reuben Kaye; as Quinlan is quoted as saying: it was “a no-brainer for our first show. It is a deeply thoughtful and exciting exploration of the concept of the diva”.

== Collections ==
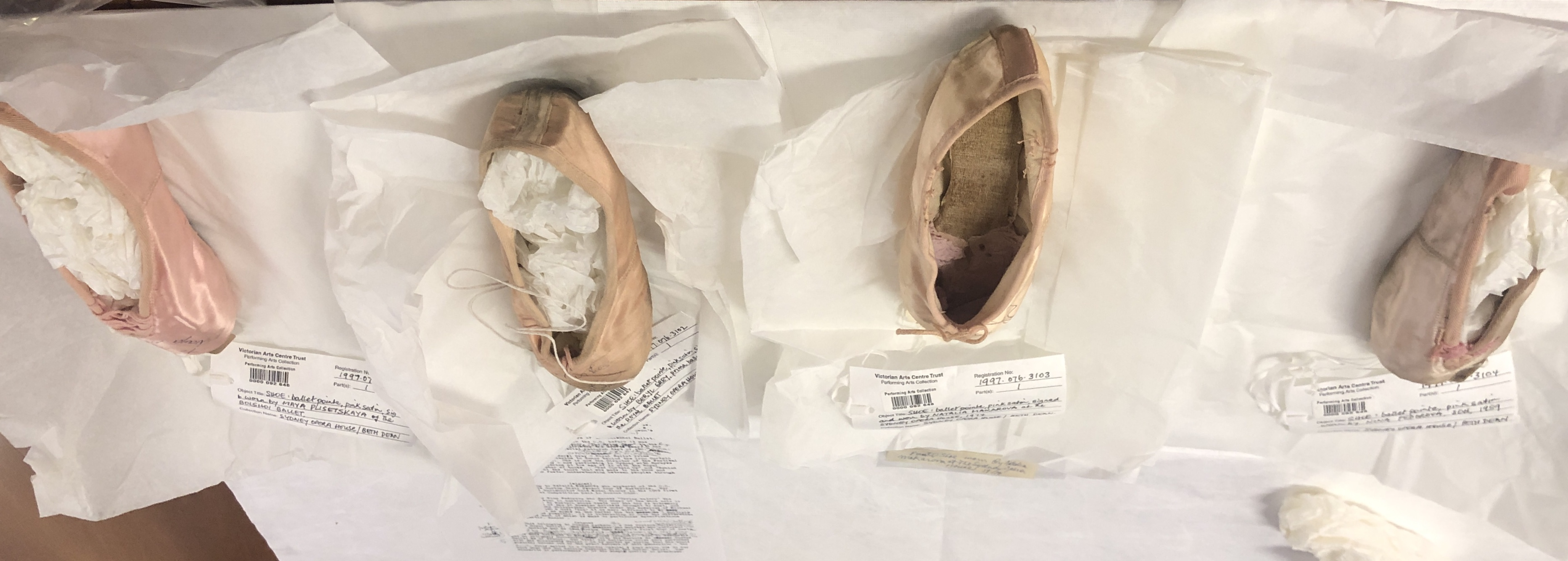
Ballet slippers in the APAC collection

Collections began being acquired before the Melbourne Arts Centre was built, officially beginning in 1979. Highlights include collections relating to musicians Nick Cave and Kylie Minogue, as well as the Australian Archives of the Dance, The Australian Ballet, Circus Oz, Juke Magazine, and more. In 1975 an advertisement announced the Arts Centre Melbourne was preparing to receive theatrical memorabilia for their museum and were inundated with materials which were looked over by a group of volunteer archivists. The collection was said to be unique at the time of its founding, because it didn't specialise and instead would collect anything to do with the performing arts.

Many of the records, along with costume and set designs, audiovisual materials, and other papers pertaining to the New Theatre, Melbourne (1936-2000), and the personal papers of theatre director Dot Thompson, were acquired by APAC in 2001.

== Directors ==
- Frank van Straten (1984-1993)
- Janine Barrand (1994-2021)
- Karen Quinlan (2022>)
