= Our Best Of =

Greatest hits album by Sunnyboys
- Released: 6 December 2013
- Genre: Power pop; new wave; alternative rock; garage rock
- Label: Festival, Warner Bros.

Sunnyboys chronology
This Is Real (2004)	Our Best Of (2013)	Best Seat in the House (2016)

Our Best Of is the third greatest hits album by the Australian power pop group, Sunnyboys. The album comprises 16 remastered tracks, hand-picked by the band as well as previously unreleased material including a pre-debut album demo. and was released in December 2013.

In March 2014, the album was supported by a national tour; the band's first run of headline dates since 1991.

== Background ==
In April 2012, 1980s alternative rock band Sunnyboys reformed as part of the Hoodoo Gurus' "Dig It Up!" festival, which led to a sold-out performance at the Sydney Opera House in June 2013. This led to the release of Our Best Of and an accompanying headline tour.

== Reception ==
i94 Bar said "There have been Sunnyboys compilations before and they've been of varying excellence... Our Best views the recording history squarely from the band members' own perspective, ups the stakes sonically with some re-mastering tweaks and throws in demo/alternative mix material plus a live track", adding "There aren't many surprises, but what's here works well - and thus it's a great starting point for the uninitiated and a must for completists."

== Track listing ==
All tracks are written by Jeremy Oxley unless otherwise shown

No.	Title	Writer(s)	Album	Length
1.	"Love to Rule"		Sunnyboys (EP)	4:12
2.	"The Seeker"		Sunnyboys (EP)	3:14
3.	"What You Need"		Sunnyboys (EP)	3:31
4.	"Tomorrow Will Be Fine" (1981 demo)		"Happy Man" B-side	2:15
5.	"Trouble in My Brain"		Sunnyboys	3:48
6.	"Tunnel of My Love"		Sunnyboys	3:14
7.	"I'm Shakin'"		Sunnyboys	4:17
8.	"Tell Me What You Say"		Sunnyboys (expanded edition)	3:43
9.	"No Love Around" (original rough mix)		Individuals	3:22
10.	"Love in a Box"		Get Some Fun	3:22
11.	"Comes as No Surprise"		Get Some Fun	4:14
12.	"Show Me Some Discipline"		Get Some Fun	3:11
13.	"You Need a Friend" (original rough mix)		Individuals	4:16
14.	"Happy Man"		Sunnyboys	3:02
15.	"Alone with You"		Sunnyboys	3:59
16.	"Let You Go" (live at the Sydney Opera House, 2013)	Phil Oxley, Jeremy Oxley	new recording	4:43

== Release history ==
Region	Date	Label	Format	Catalogue
Australia	6 December 2013	Mushroom	CD, download	FEST601022
