= Play the Best =

Greatest hits album by Sunnyboys
- Released: 8 July 1991
- Genre: Power pop; new wave; alternative rock; garage rock
- Label: Mushroom
- Producer: Jeremy Oxley, John Bee, Lobby Loyde, Nick Garvey

Sunnyboys chronology
Wildcat (1989)	Play the Best (1991)	Shakin: Live August 1991 (1991)

Play the Best is the first greatest hits album by the Australian power pop group, Sunnyboys. It was released in July 1991 and peaked at number 75 on the ARIA Albums Chart.

== Track listing ==
All tracks are written by Jeremy Oxley unless otherwise shown

No.	Title	Writer(s)	Album	Length
1.	"Happy Man"		Sunnyboys	3:00
2.	"It Comes as No Surprise to Me"		Get Some Fun	4:11
3.	"You Need a Friend"		Individuals	5:42
4.	"Gone"	Peter Oxley	Sunnyboys	3:42
5.	"Love in a Box"		Get Some Fun	3:21
6.	"Show Me Some Discipline"		Get Some Fun	4:00
7.	"Thrill"	Peter Oxley, Jeremy Oxley	Sunnyboys (expanded edition)	3:18
8.	"Alone with You"		Sunnyboys	3:58
9.	"Safe Life"		Get Some Fun (expanded edition)	3:49
10.	"Trouble in My Brain"		Sunnyboys	3:45
11.	"Strange Cohesion"		Real Live	3:55
12.	"The Stooge"	Peter Oxley	Get Some Fun	4:46
13.	"Let You Go"	Peter Oxley, Jeremy Oxley	Sunnyboys	4:42
14.	"It's a Sunny Day"		Individuals	4:20
15.	"Days Are Gone"		Individuals	3:25
16.	"The Idealist"		previously unreleased track, recorded during the Get Some Fun sessions	4:40

== Charts ==
Chart (1991)	Peak position
Australian Albums (ARIA)	75

== Release history ==
Date	Region	Label	Format	Catalogue
8 July 1991	Australia	Mushroom Records	CD, Cassette	D24501
