= Best Seat in the House =

Live album by Sunnyboys
- Released: 26 February 2016
- Recorded: 14 March 2015
- Venues: Enmore Theatre; Sydney, Australia
- Genres: Power pop; alternative rock; garage rock
- Label: Feels Records

Sunnyboys chronology
Our Best of (2013)	Best Seat in the House (2016)	40 (2019)

Best Seat in the House is a live album by the Australian power pop group, Sunnyboys. It was recorded at the Enmore Theatre, Sydney on 14 March 2015. The album includes live favourites, the hits and rare tracks. The album was announced on 7 February and released on 26 February 2016.

Upon release, Sunnyboys' bassist Peter Oxley told the Sydney Morning Herald "I'm 55 and I know how I feel about music. If I get to see a band who I really liked when I was 20, I'll go and do it because to me it's an ageless feeling. A lot of people who grew up when we did, going out to see bands four or five nights a week ... for them now to see those bands that they really loved is something incredibly special. It brings back such great, fond memories."

== Reception ==
Professional ratings
Review scores
Source	Rating
The Music AU	4.5/5 stars
Courier Mail	4/5 stars

Steve Bell from the Music AU said; "This 2015 live recording from Sydney's Enmore Theatre documents the phoenix-like return of '80s Oz rock institution Sunnyboys after a lengthy stint in the wilderness. It proves that they remain a live force. Jeremy Oxley's coarse vocals drip with passion and conviction and the band lock together like a well oiled machine: like all live albums there's the odd wart, but the power, melody and beauty inherent in tracks like "What You Need", "Happy Man", "Individuals" and "Alone With You" highlight why Sunnyboys remain so revered by so many."

Catherine Gale from Courier Mail said; "This gig sees the original line-up playing with all the energy and precision that made the Sunnyboys 1980s live favourites" adding "Although they excelled in the studio, it’s live where the Sunnyboys held their own – and still do. It’s a thrill to hear the band in such amazing form after playing sporadically the last few years after a three-decade hiatus. As much as this is a fan’s delight, it would seem the Sunnyboys are also playing for themselves. From the opening track "Love to Rule", they make it abundantly clear this is for real and not a nostalgia trip. It’s hard to single out the highlights as the entire performance is powerful and triumphant on a number of levels. They were an inspiration in the eighties and continue to be so in 2016."

Terry Teece, who was present at the live recording, said of the album; "Jeremy Oxley is in top form, making his guitar sing, his voice is still powerful and amazing, the rhythm section of Bill Bilson and Peter Oxley is a well-oiled awesome machine, and Richard Burgman is attacking his axe with as much fury as ever. They have still got it and it comes through on the album."

== Track listing ==
All tracks are written by Jeremy Oxley unless otherwise shown.

No.	Title	Writer(s)	Length
1.	"Love to Rule"
2.	"Tunnel of Love"
3.	"My Old Friend"
4.	"Trouble in My Brain"
5.	"Individuals"
6.	"What You Need"
7.	"Happy Man"
8.	"No Love Around"
9.	"The Stooge"	Phil Oxley
10.	"Show Me Some Discipline"
11.	"Tomorrow Will Be Fine"
12.	"You Need a Friend"
13.	"I'm Shakin'"
14.	"Alone with You"
15.	"The Seeker"

== Release history ==
Date	Region	Label	Format	Catalogue
26 February 2016	Australia	Feels Records	CD	FEEL015
