= 40 (Sunnyboys album) =

Greatest hits album by Sunnyboys
- Released: 29 November 2019
- Label: Feel Records

Sunnyboys chronology
Best Seat in the House (2016)	40 (2019)

40 (also known as Sunnyboys 40) is a greatest hits/re-issue album by the Australian power pop group, Sunnyboys. 40 is a re-issue of the four songs on the group's debut self-titled extended play and adding four new studio recordings of songs from the Jeremy Oxley archive. The album was released in November 2019 and peaked at number 84 on the ARIA Charts.

Band member Jeremy Oxley "You can't keep a good band down. These new and revitalised songs take it back to the reason behind the band in the first instance. The 40 years in between is nicely depicted in the change in voice while the energy and craftsmanship is still there in the sound, albeit a little fuller and rounder. I guess, it's just like us too really."

The album was supported by a national tour which took place across Australia in February and March 2020.

== Songs ==
The album is an album of two sides. The first four tracks (or side A on the vinyl) comprises the four songs released on the band's self-titled 7" extended play in December 1980. The original vinyl version sold out in a couple of weeks, and was re-pressed in a remixed 12" version soon after. This is the first time that the original mixes have made it to CD. Anthony Gebhardt from BlackGC described the 4 tracks as "punchy, '60s channelling power pop nuggets par excellence, resplendent with youthful vigour and sharply honed energy."

The new recordings are all "old" Jeremy Oxley songs. They were committed to tape in a break from touring in Brisbane in 2018, fleshed out with some overdubs in 2019 and mixed by Konstantin Kersting. "Can't You Stop" is a re-worked song from Jeremy's post-Sunnyboys band, The Fishermen, recorded in 1986. "Lovers (On Another Planet's Hell)" is from the 1984 Get Some Fun album. It receives a substantial make-over. "Strange Cohesion" was originally recorded during the 1982 Individuals album and made it to the band's 1984 Sunnyboys Real Live album. "Way After Five" was recorded but omitted from Jeremy Oxley's 1992 extended play A Little Bit of You in Me.

== Reception ==
Professional ratings
Review scores
Source	Rating
i94 Bar	4.5/5 stars
The Australian	4/5 stars
Beat Magazine	7/10 stars

i94 Bar said "40" hasn't been put out with visions of global dominance in anybody's head and they’re not backed by big budget marketing hype either... 40 is for fans although recent converts won't find anything to dislike."

Bronius Zumeris from Beat Magazine gave the album 7 out of 10 saying "One can rock out to the mod-pop quality of the first four songs and recall summer days sucking on namesake ice cubes and dreaming to be 'Alone with you, tonight'. This quartet of songs is a sterling way to whet the appetite and re-introduce the band. It's apparent why the Sunnyboys were considered hot property during their 1980s heyday. The songs are message songs and not the fairytale world of pirates and highway robbers so popular at the time."

== Track listing ==
All tracks are written by Jeremy Oxley.

No.	Title	Length
1.	"Love to Rule"	4:14
2.	"Alone with You"	3:50
3.	"What You Need"	3:34
4.	"The Seeker"	3:43
5.	"Can't You Stop"	3:57
6.	"Lovers (On Another Planets Hell)"	3:19
7.	"Strange Cohesion"	4:01
8.	"Way After Five"	3:56

== Charts ==
Chart (2019)	Peak position
Australian Albums (ARIA Charts)	84

== Release history ==
Region	Date	Label	Format	Catalogue
Australia	29 November 2019	Feel Records	CD, LP, streaming, download	FEEL016LP
