= Sonny Boy =

Sonny Boy or Sunny Boy may refer to:

== In music ==
- "Sonny Boy" (song), a 1928 song written by Ray Henderson, Bud De Sylva, and Lew Brown
- Sonny Boy (album), a 1961 album by jazz saxophonist Sonny Rollins featuring the above song

== Film and television ==
- Sonny Boy (1929 film), an American film
- Sonny Boy (1989 film), starring Paul L. Smith and David Carradine
- Sonny Boy, a 2004 documentary film directed by Soleil Moon Frye
- Sonny Boy (2011 film), a Dutch film
- Sonny Boy (TV series), a 2021 Japanese anime television series

== People ==
- Sonny Boy Jaro (born 1982), Filipino professional boxer, former WBC Flyweight World Champion
- Sonny Boy Nelson (1908–1998), American blues musician
- Sonny Boy West (1929–1950), American professional boxer
- Sonny Boy Williamson I (1914–1948), American blues harmonica player John Lee Curtis Williamson
- Sonny Boy Williamson II (died 1965), American blues harmonica player Aleck Ford "Rice" Miller, unrelated to the above
- Brian Roy Goble (1957–2014), Canadian singer and musician also known as "Sunny Boy"
- Sunny Boy (rapper) (born 1983), Namibian rapper Sunday Shipushu

== Other uses ==
- "Sonny Boy" (short story), a P. G. Wodehouse short story from Eggs, Beans and Crumpets
- Sonny Boy (book), a memoir by Al Pacino
- Sunny Boy (mascot), mascot of the University of Washington Sun Dodgers
- Sunny Boy Cereal, a brand of porridge
- Sunnyboy, a brand of flavoured ice block
