= Sunnyboys Real Live =

Live album by Sunnyboys
- Released: November 1984
- Recorded: 29–30 June 1984
- Venue: The Chevron Hotel, The Maroubra Seal Club; Sydney, Australia
- Genre: Power pop; alternative rock; garage rock
- Label: Mushroom
- Producer: Jeremy Oxley, John Bee

Sunnyboys chronology
Get Some Fun (1984)	Sunnyboys Real Live (1984)	Wildcat (1989)

Sunnyboys Real Live is the first live album by the Australian power pop group, Sunnyboys. It was recorded in June 1984 and released in November 1984 on Mushroom Records.

== Background ==
Following the release of Get Some Fun in April 1984, the group supported The Police and by June, the Sunnyboys announced they were disbanding: internal dissent and the pressure and stress of industry expectation being cited as the reasons for the break-up. The group's performance in Sydney's Chevron Hotel and Maroubra Seal Club in June 1984 were released in November 1984. A final national tour at Sydney’s Graphic Arts Club on 23 and 24 December were sell-outs.

== Track listing ==
All tracks are written by Jeremy Oxley unless otherwise shown

Side A
No.	Title	Length
1.	"I'm Shakin'"
2.	"Trouble in My Brain"
3.	"Alone with You"
4.	"Liar"
5.	"Lovers (On Another Planet's Hell)"

Side B
No.	Title	Writer(s)	Length
1.	"I Can't Talk to You"
2.	"The Stooge"	Phil Oxley
3.	"Strange Cohesion"
4.	"Love in a Box"
5.	"Cat Walk"	The Sunnyboys
6.	"Show Me Some Discipline"

== Release history ==
Date	Region	Label	Format	Catalogue
November 1984	Australia	Mushroom	LP	L38259
1991	Australia	Mushroom	CD	D 19233
14 Oct 1997	Australia	Mushroom	CD	MUSH32356.2
