= Individuals (album) =

Studio album by Sunnyboys
- Released: May 1982
- Recorded: 1982
- Studio: Mandrill Studios, Auckland, New Zealand
- Genre: Power pop; alternative rock
- Label: Mushroom
- Producer: Lobby Loyde

Sunnyboys chronology
Sunnyboys (1981)	Individuals (1982)	Get Some Fun (1984)

Singles from Individuals
- 1. "You Need a Friend" Released: April 1982; 2. "This is Real" Released: August 1982

Individuals is the second studio album by the Australian power pop group, Sunnyboys. Like the band’s debut, it was produced by Lobby Loyde. The album was released in May 1982 on Mushroom Records, and peaked at No. 23 on the Australian Kent Music Report albums chart.

== Track listing ==
All tracks are written by Jeremy Oxley unless otherwise shown.

Side A
No.	Title	Length
1.	"This Is Real"	3:36
2.	"Individuals"	4:51
3.	"It's a Sunny Day"	4:20
4.	"Leaf on a Tree"	3:22
5.	"You Need a Friend"	4:47

Side B
No.	Title	Writer(s)	Length
1.	"No Love Around"		3:21
2.	"I'm Not Satisfied"		4:13
3.	"Days Are Gone"		3:11
4.	"You Don't Need Me"	Peter Oxley	3:24
5.	"Colour of Love"		5:48

2015 Reissue
No.	Title	Writer(s)	Length
1.	"Individuals"		4:51
2.	"It's a Sunny Day"		4:20
3.	"Leaf on a Tree"		3:22
4.	"You Need a Friend"		4:47
5.	"No Love Around"		3:21
6.	"I'm Not Satisfied"		4:13
7.	"Days Are Gone"		3:11
8.	"You Don't Need Me"	Peter Oxley	3:24
9.	"Colour of Love"		5:48
10.	"Pain"
11.	"This Is Real"		3:36
12.	"I'm Not Satisfied" (live)
13.	"I'm Shakin'" (live)
14.	"Alone With You" (live)
15.	"Trouble in My Brain" (live)
16.	"You Need A Friend" (live)
17.	"Show Me Some Discipline" (7" version)

== Charts ==
Chart (1982)	Peak position
Australia Kent Music Report Album Chart	26

== Release history ==
Date	Region	Label	Format	Catalogue
May 1982	Australia	Mushroom	LP	L37835
14 October 1997	Australia	Mushroom	CD	MUSH32357.2
6 March 2015	Australia	Feel Presents	CD / DD	FEEL 013

== Personnel ==
Sunnyboys

- Bil Bilson – drums
- Richard Burgman – guitar
- Jeremy Oxley – guitar, vocals
- Peter Oxley – bass guitar
