= Sunnyboys =

Australian power pop band

- Origin: Sydney, New South Wales, Australia
- Genres: Power pop; post-punk
- Years active: 1979–1984, 1987–1989, 1991, 1998, 2012–2023
- Labels: Phantom; Mushroom; Closer; RCA
- Past members: see Members

Sunnyboys were an Australian power pop band formed in Sydney in 1979. Fronted by singer-songwriter/guitarist Jeremy Oxley, the band began performing on the city's pub circuit – where, according to music historian Ian Mc Farlane, they "breathed some freshness and vitality into the divergent Sydney scene". Their first two albums, Sunnyboys and Individuals, both appeared in the Top 30 of the Australian Kent Music Report Albums Chart.

Sunnyboys first broke up in June of 1984. Jeremy Oxley then formed various incarnations of the band throughout the 1980s and into 1991 as the only original member. Three-quarters of the original line-up then reunited for a one-off show in 1998 for the Mushroom 25 Concert. In 2012, the original line-up reunited for a surprise show in Sydney as part of the Dig It Up concert series, billed as "Kids in Dust". The original line-up of Sunnyboys later played sporadic shows in 2013 and continued to tour periodically for the rest of the decade. In September 2022, the band announced their impending split following a farewell tour in early 2023. They played their final show at the Enmore Theatre in Sydney on 18 February 2023.

== History ==
=== 1979–1984: Australian success ===
Brothers Jeremy and Peter Oxley and Bil Bilson came from the northern New South Wales town of Kingscliff where they played in a garage band called Wooden Horse. Richard Burgman (Kamikaze Kids) came from Wagga Wagga. Peter Oxley, Bil Bilson and Richard Burgman met in Sydney in 1979 and formed a band with Penny Ward, Shy Imposters, which broke up in early 1980. (Phantom Records released a posthumous single "At the Barrier" (PH-6) in 1981). Joined by Jeremy Oxley, they formed a new band, Sunnyboys. The band's name came from a Sunnyboy, an orange-flavoured water ice in a tetrahedron shaped 'tetra-pack'. According to Richard Burgman, the band chose the name because it represented 'bright, happy, young, fun'. The band's first public performance was on 15 August 1980, supporting The Lipstick Killers and Me 262, and it quickly became popular in the Sydney band scene.

In October 1980 Sunnyboys recorded four songs produced by Lobby Loyde. These tracks, "Love to Rule", "The Seeker", "What You Need" and "Alone With You", appeared on the band's self-titled and independently released EP on Phantom Records in December 1980. The initial pressing of 1,000 copies sold out in two weeks. The EP was later remixed and reissued as a 12" EP (PH-11).

Sunnyboys signed to Mushroom Records in February 1981, becoming the first Sydney-based band on the label. Their first single, "Happy Man", was released in July 1981 and peaked at number 26 on the national chart. The same month they made an independent EP entitled Happy Birthday, this was given away at gigs.

Sunnyboys' eponymous debut album was recorded at Alberts Studio in Sydney between May and July 1981 with producer/mentor Lobby Loyde. The album peaked at number 13 on the national charts in October 1981. A second single was lifted from the album, a re-recorded version of "Alone With You", which peaked at number 28.

The band recorded their second album, Individuals, in New Zealand in the midst of their heavy touring schedule. Individuals was released in May 1982, peaking at number 19. The album's lead single "You Need a Friend" peaked at number 38.

=== 1985–2000: Post-original line-ups and RCA revival ===
Following the demise of Sunnyboys, Jeremy Oxley launched a new band called Chinless Elite. Shortly thereafter he formed another group, called Fishermen. This band released one single entitled "Can't You Stop?" on the Waterfront label. Richard Burgman joined The Saints and ultimately Weddings Parties Anything. He later emigrated to Canada. Peter Oxley and Bil Bilson formed the soul band The Sparklers with another Oxley sibling, Melanie.

In late 1987, Jeremy Oxley attempted to revive Sunnyboys with a new line-up. The new band signed a deal with RCA and released an album entitled Wildcat (produced by ex-Sherbet keyboard player, Garth Porter). Four singles were released from the album, which peaked at number 63 on the ARIA Charts. This incarnation of the band broke up in 1989.

In July 1991, Mushroom released the compilation album Play the Best and the original line-up reunited for a national tour.

In November 1998 the band reformed for the Mushroom 25 Concert at the Melbourne Cricket Ground to celebrate the 25th anniversary of Mushroom Records, organised by Michael Gudinski. For the concert Burgman was replaced by Jeremy and Peter's younger brother Tim Oxley on guitar. Sunnyboys appeared on the original VHS release of the concert and the 2002 re-release CD and DVD. In October 2010, their 1981 debut album, Sunnyboys, was listed in the top 40 in the book, 100 Best Australian Albums.

=== 2012–2023: Periodic touring and farewell tour ===
In April 2012, the original line-up of the band played as part of the Dig It Up concert series organised by the Hoodoo Gurus, at the Enmore Theatre in Sydney, Australia. The band was listed on the bill as "Kids in Dust". They played a 45-minute set that featured songs drawn mostly from the first self-titled album. An audio-visual recording of the performance was later released on DVD, Sunnyboys: Dig It Up! Live at the Enmore Theatre 22.4.12 (Feel DVD002).

In July 2012 it was announced that the original line-up would be playing at the 2012 Meredith Music Festival on 7 December. The following night they played a show at the Corner Hotel in Melbourne, which sold out in under an hour. In late January and early February 2013, they supported Elvis Costello and the Imposters on their Australian tour. On 2 June they played a sold out performance at the Concert Hall of the Sydney Opera House.

In December 2013, Warner Music Australia released Our Best Of, a 16-track retrospective featuring remastered songs and rarities. In March 2014, the band undertook a national headline tour and again in March 2015, In March 2016, the band played as part of the 'A Day on the Green' concert series with Hoodoo Gurus, Violent Femmes, Died Pretty and Ratcat.

In 2020, Sunnyboys celebrated 40 years since their inception by releasing 40 in November 2019. The album brought together the first ever re-release of the band's 1980 eponymous debut 7" (featuring the original version of "Alone with You") alongside four new recordings from the archives of chief songwriter Jeremy Oxley.

In September 2022, the group announced their 2023 Australian tour would be the band's last.

== Members ==
=== Sunnyboys ===
Final line-up

- Jeremy Oxley – lead vocals, lead guitar (1980–1984, 1987–1989, 1991, 1998, 2012–2023)
- Peter Oxley – bass, backing and occasional lead vocals (1980–1984, 1991, 1998, 2012–2023)
- Bil Bilson – drums (1980–1984, 1991, 1998, 2012–2023)
- Richard Burgman – rhythm guitar, backing vocals (1980–1984, 1991, 2012–2023)

Former members

- Nick Freedman – rhythm guitar (1987–1989)
- Tim Freedman – keyboards (1987)
- Peter Hincenbergs – drums (1987–1989)
- Phil Smith – bass (1987–1989)
- Tim Oxley – rhythm guitar (1998)

Touring musicians

- Alister Spence – keyboards, piano (2013–2023)

== Discography ==
=== Studio albums ===
Year	Album details	Peak chart positions	Certifications (sales thresholds)
Year	Album details	AUS	Certifications (sales thresholds)
1981	Sunnyboys: Released: September 1981; Label: Mushroom (L37696); Format: LP	13	ARIA: Platinum
1982	Individuals: Released: May 1982; Label: Mushroom (L37835); Format: LP	23	
1984	Get Some Fun: Released: April 1984; Label: Mushroom (RML53129); Format: LP	36	
1989	Wildcat: Released: August 1989; Label: RCA (VLPI 0806); Format: CD, LP	63	

=== Live albums ===
Year	Album details
1984	Sunnyboys Real Live: Released: November 1984; Label: Mushroom (L38259); Format: LP
1991	Shakin: Live August 1991: Released: 1991; Label: Phantom (PHCD-16); Format: CD
2016	Live – Best Seat in the House: Released: 26 February 2016; Label: Feel Presents (FEEL 015); Format: CD

=== Compilation albums ===
Year	Album details	Peak chart positions
Year	Album details	AUS
1991	Play the Best: Released: July 1991; Label: Mushroom (L38259); Format: CD	75
2004	This Is Real: Released: September 2004; Label: Feel Presents (FEEL002); Format: CD	—
2013	Our Best Of: Released: 6 December 2013; Label: Festival (FEST601022); Format: CD, download	—
2019	40: Released: 29 November 2019; Label: Feel Present (FEEL016CD); Format: CD, download, streaming	84
2022	Sunnyboys '81–'84: Released: 11 November 2022; Label: Warner Music Australia (5419713166); Format: 2×LP	—

=== Extended plays ===
Year	EP details
1980	Sunnyboys: Released: December 1980; Label: Phantom (PH-7); Format: LP
1981	Sunnyboys Remixed: Released: 1981; Limited Edition; Label: Phantom (PH-11); Format: LP
1981	Happy Birthday: Released: July 1981; Label: Mushroom (SMX 57856); Format: LP

=== Singles ===
List of singles as lead artist, with selected chart positions and certifications
Year	Title	Peak chart positions	Album
Year	Title	AUS	Album
1981	"Happy Man"	26	Sunnyboys
1981	"Alone with You"	28	Sunnyboys
1982	"You Need a Friend"	38	Individuals
1982	"This Is Real"	—	Individuals
1983	"Show Me Some Discipline"	44	Get Some Fun
1984	"Love in a Box"	46	Get Some Fun
1984	"Comes as No Surprise"	99	Get Some Fun
1988	"Too Young to Despair"	87	Wildcat
1989	"Sinful Me"	105	Wildcat
1989	"Sad Girl"	—	Wildcat
1990	"Sorrow Is Mine"	—	Wildcat
