= Porridge =

Food

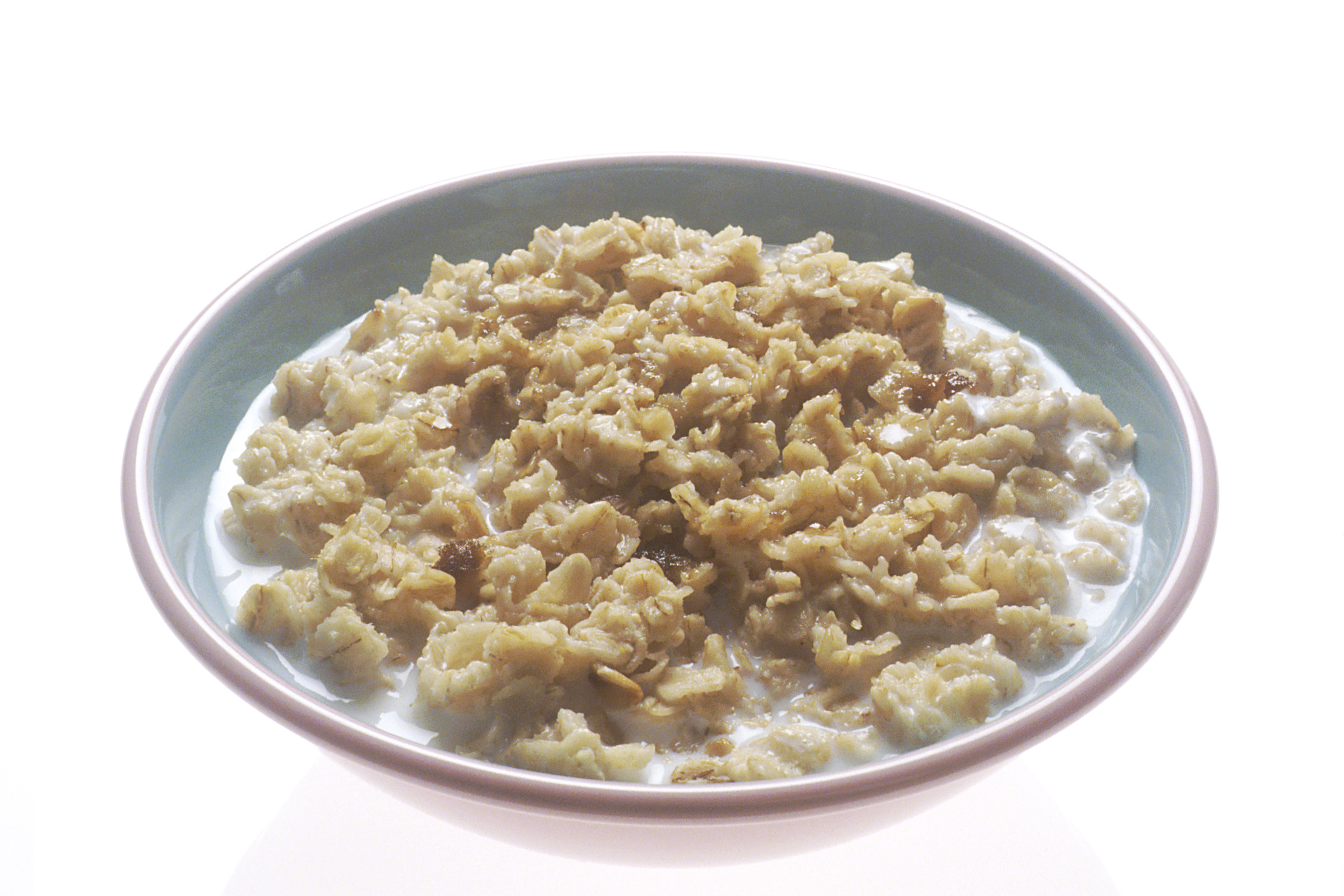
- Oatmeal porridge
- Course: Breakfast
- Serving temperature: Hot
- Main ingredients: Starchy plants (e.g. grain), water or milk, flavourings

Porridge is a type of semi-solid food made by soaking, poaching or boiling, in milk or water, ground, crushed or chopped starchy plants, typically grain. It is a traditional staple food of many countries.

Other spellings of porridge include porage (obsolete, United Kingdom), parritch (Scottish/Northern English), and parrige (Scottish and Caribbean).

Porridge is often cooked or served with added flavourings such as salt, sugar, honey, fruit, jam or syrup, or it can be mixed with spices, fish, meat or vegetables to make a savoury dish. It is usually served hot in a bowl or a pot, depending on its consistency.

Many variants of porridge have their own names. Oat porridge is known as oatmeal in North America, and is one of the most common types. Others include polenta, made from maize; poi, from taro; gruel, a thinner version of oat porridge; congee, an Asian savoury rice porridge; and brose and crowdie, Scottish uncooked porridges made from oats in water.

== Type of grains ==
The term "porridge" is used in British English (Britain, Ireland, Australia and New Zealand) specifically for oat porridge, consisting of rolled oats or oatmeal cooked in water and/or milk. It is traditionally eaten for breakfast with salt, sugar, honey, jam, whisky, milk, cream, and/or butter; further toppings popular in the 21st century include syrup, seeds, nuts, and chocolate.

Other grains used for porridge include rice, maize, wheat (e.g. frumenty), barley, corn , triticale and buckwheat.

== Conventional uses ==
Porridge can be eaten for any meal of the day. Porridge is eaten in many cultures around the world as a common snack or as breakfast, lunch or dinner.

== Nutrition ==
Unenriched porridge (oatmeal), cooked with water
Nutritional value per 100 g (3.5 oz)
- Energy: 297 kJ (71 kcal)
- Carbohydrates: 12 g
- Sugars: 0.3
- Dietary fiber: 1.7 g
- Fat: 1.5 g
- Protein: 2.5 g
Vitamins and minerals
Vitamins	Quantity %DV^{†}
Vitamin A equiv.	0% 0 μg
Thiamine (B1)	7% 0.08 mg
Riboflavin (B2)	2% 0.02 mg
Niacin (B3)	1% 0.23 mg
Pantothenic acid (B5)	4% 0.197 mg
Vitamin B6	0% 0.005 mg
Folate (B9)	2% 6 μg
Vitamin C	0% 0 mg
Vitamin E	1% 0.08 mg
Vitamin K	0% 0.3 μg
Minerals	Quantity %DV^{†}
Calcium	1% 9 mg
Iron	5% 0.9 mg
Magnesium	6% 27 mg
Manganese	26% 0.6 mg
Phosphorus	6% 77 mg
Potassium	2% 70 mg
Sodium	0% 4 mg
Zinc	9% 1 mg
- Other constituents: Quantity
- Water: 83.6
- Link to USDA Database entry
- ^{†}Percentages estimated using US recommendations for adults, except for potassium, which is estimated based on expert recommendation from the National Academies.

Unenriched porridge (as oatmeal), cooked by boiling or microwave, is 84% water, and contains 12% carbohydrates, including 2% dietary fiber and 2% each of protein and fat (table). In a 100 g (3.5 oz) reference amount, cooked porridge provides 71 calories and contains 26% of the Daily Value (DV) for manganese, with no other micronutrients in significant content (table).

=== Health effect ===
A 2014 review found that daily intake of at least 3 grams of oat beta-glucan lowers total and low-density lipoprotein cholesterol levels by 5–10% in people with normal or elevated blood cholesterol levels. Beta-glucan lowers cholesterol by inhibiting cholesterol production, although cholesterol reduction is greater in people with higher total cholesterol and LDL cholesterol in their blood. In the United States, the Food and Drug Administration issued a final ruling in 2015 stating that food companies can make health claims on food labels for products containing soluble fiber from whole oats (oat bran, oat flour and rolled oats), noting that 3.0 grams of soluble fiber daily from these foods may reduce the risk of heart disease. To qualify for the health claim, the food that contains the oats must provide at least 0.75 grams of soluble fiber per serving.

== Varieties ==
=== Maize ===
- Maize porridge:
  - Atole, a Mexican dish of corn flour in water or milk.
  - Champurrado (a chocolate-based atole), a Mexican blend of sugar, milk, chocolate and corn dough or corn flour. The Philippine dish tsampurado is similar, with rice instead of maize.
  - Cir, păsat or (when firmer) mămăligă are all Romanian maize porridges.
  - Colada, a hot dish prepared with corn starch, milk, sugar and cinnamon in Colombia and Ecuador.
  - Cornmeal mush, a traditional dish in southern and mid-Atlantic US states.
  - Cornmeal porridge (parrige), a traditional dish served for breakfast throughout the Caribbean and among Rastafarians. A blend of fine semolina with milk or water and often with all spice and sugar.
  - Farina or papilla, a traditional Dominican dish of porridge maize or grass peas.
  - Gachas, a Spanish porridge of maize or grass peas. Often garnished with roasted almonds and croutons of bread fried in olive oil.
  - Gofio, a Canary Islands porridge of toasted coarse-ground maize. Made from roasted sweetcorn and other grains (e.g., wheat, barley or oats), used in many ways in parts of the world from which Canary Islanders have emigrated.
  - Grits, ground hominy, is common in the southern United States, traditionally served with butter, salt and black pepper. Sometimes, it is also prepared with cheese.
  - Kačamak, a maize porridge from the Balkans.
  - Kānga pirau, a fermented corn porridge dish that is made and consumed by the Māori people of New Zealand
  - Mazamorra, a maize porridge from Colombia's Paisa region made with whole maize grains that can be sweet or salty.
  - Polenta, an Italian maize porridge which is cooked to a solidified state and sliced for serving.
  - Rubaboo is made from dried maize and peas with animal fat and was a staple food of the Voyageurs.
  - Shuco, a Salvadoran dish of black, blue or purple corn flour, ground pumpkin seeds, chili sauce and red cooked kidney beans, which was traditionally drunk out of a hollowed-out gourd at early morning, especially coming from a hunting or drinking trip.
  - Suppawn, also called, and better known as, hasty pudding, was common in American colonial times and consisted of cornmeal boiled with milk into a thick porridge. Still eaten in modern times, it is no longer necessarily corn-based.
  - Žganci, a maize porridge prepared in the Kajkavian counties of Croatia and in Slovenia.
  - Api Morado (Bolivia), warm breakfast drink made of purple corn.

=== Millet ===
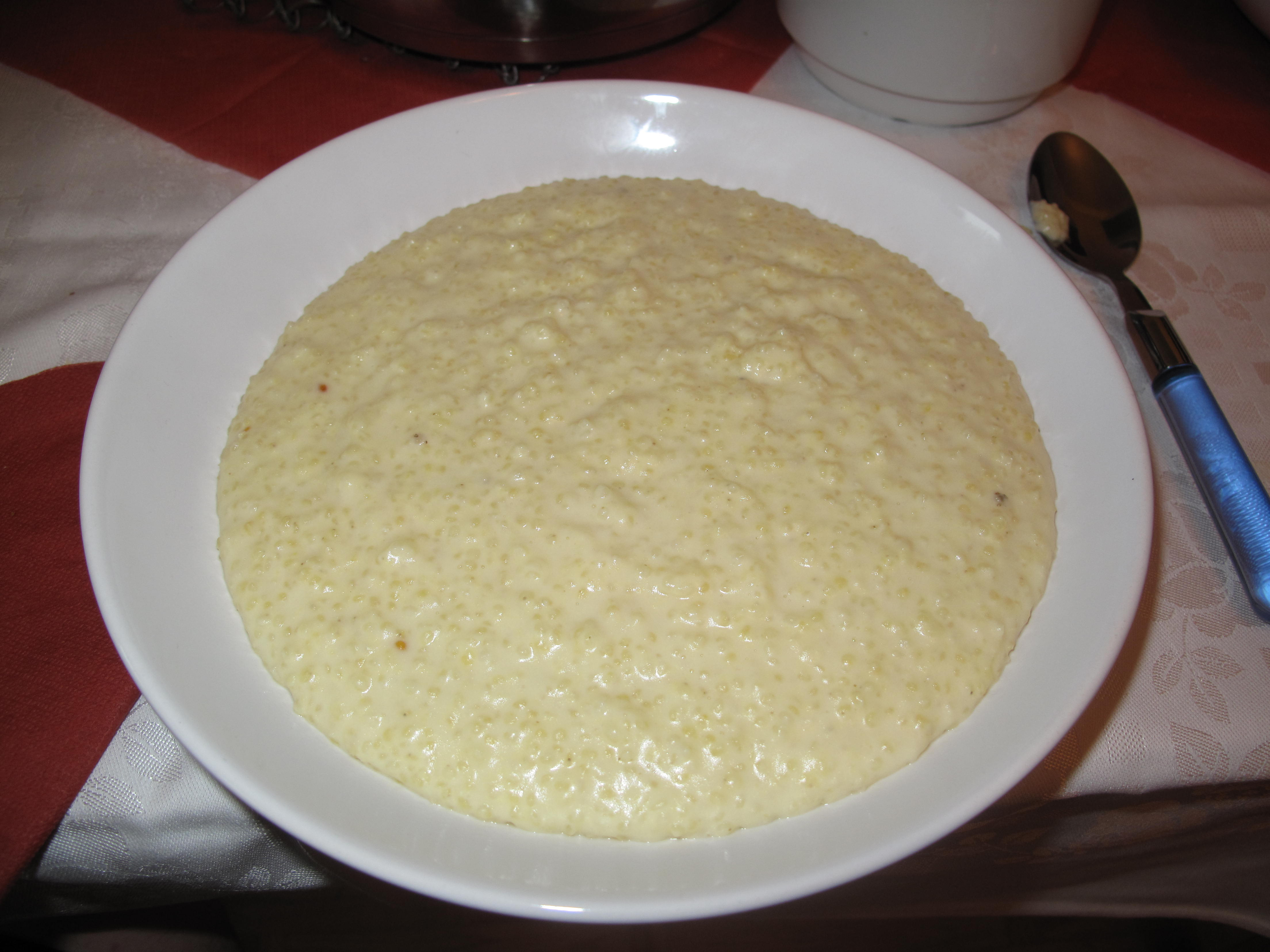
Millet porridge

- Millet porridge:
  - Foxtail millet porridge is a staple food in northern China.
  - A porridge made from pearl millet is the staple food in Niger and surrounding regions of the Sahel.
  - Middle Eastern millet porridge, often seasoned with cumin and honey.
  - Munchiro sayo, a millet porridge eaten by the Ainu, a native people of northern Japan.
  - Milium in aqua was a millet porridge made with goat's milk that was eaten in ancient Rome.
  - A ragi porridge, by name 'jaava' is consumed as a breakfast item during summer season in the Telugu speaking region of India
  - Koozh is a millet porridge commonly sold in Tamil Nadu.

=== Oat ===
- Oat porridge, traditional and common in the English-speaking world, Germany, and the Nordic countries. Oat porridge has been found in the stomachs of 5,000-year-old Neolithic bog bodies in Central Europe and Scandinavia. Varieties of oat porridge include:
  - Burgoo, a porridge made from coarse oatmeal and water. In the Royal Navy during the Napoleonic Wars, cooks made this for the men for breakfast.
  - Groats, a porridge made from unprocessed oats or wheat.
  - Gruel, very thin porridge, often drunk rather than eaten.
  - Yod Kerc'h, a traditional oat porridge from the north-west of France, primarily Brittany, made with oats, butter and water or milk.
  - Owsianka, an east European (Russia, Poland, Belarus, Ukraine) traditional breakfast made with hot milk, oats and sometimes with sugar and butter.
  - Porridge made from rolled oats or ground oatmeal is common in the UK, Ireland, Australia, New Zealand, North America, Finland and Scandinavia. It is known as simply "porridge" or, more commonly in the United States and Canada, "oatmeal". In the US, oat and wheat porridge can both be called "hot cereal". Rolled oats are commonly used in England, oatmeal in Scotland and steel-cut oats in Ireland.
  - Porridge (Parrige) – Anglophone Caribbean (Guyana, Jamaica, Trinidad etc.) Also known as Pap. The most common type is corn meal, and they are always made with milk. Varieties include oatmeal, grated green plantain, barley, cream of wheat, sago (tapioca). Oatmeal porridge is often flavoured with cinnamon, nutmeg, brown sugar or almond essence.
  - Stirabout – Irish porridge, traditionally made by stirring oats into boiling water
  - Terci de ovăz, traditional oatmeal in Romania.
  - Zabkása, traditional oatmeal in Hungary.

==== Types of oats ====
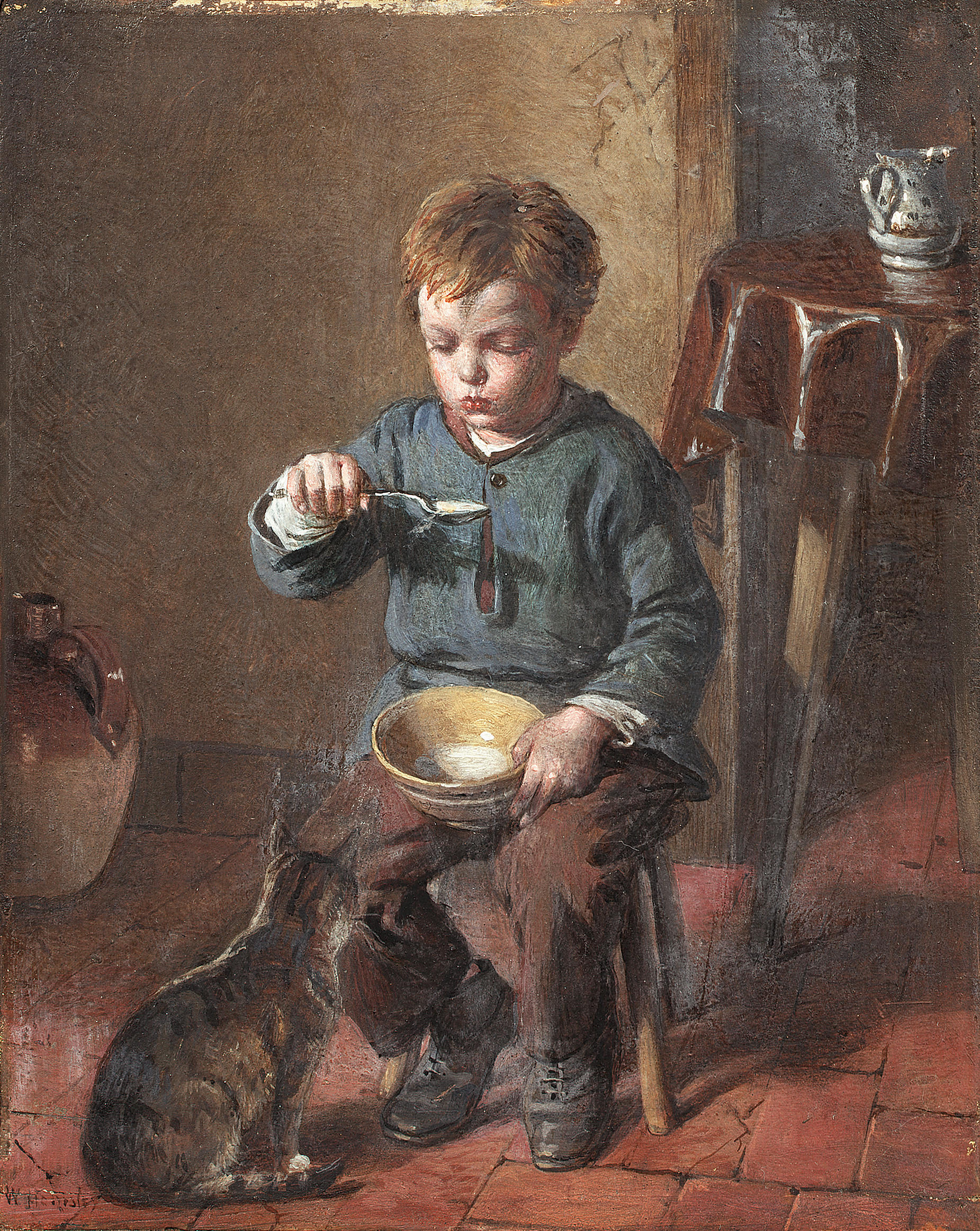
Porridge by William Hemsley (1893)

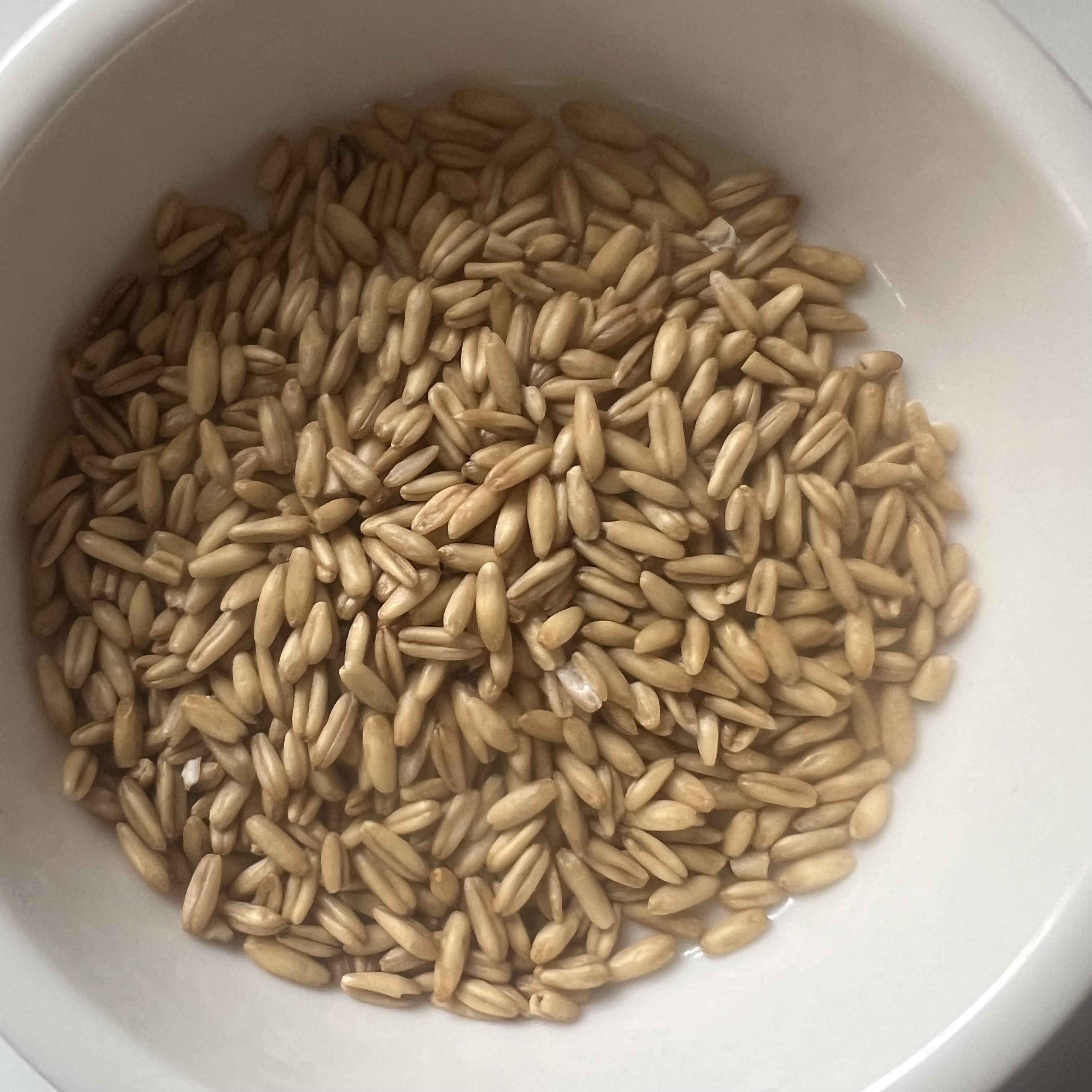
Uncooked oat groats

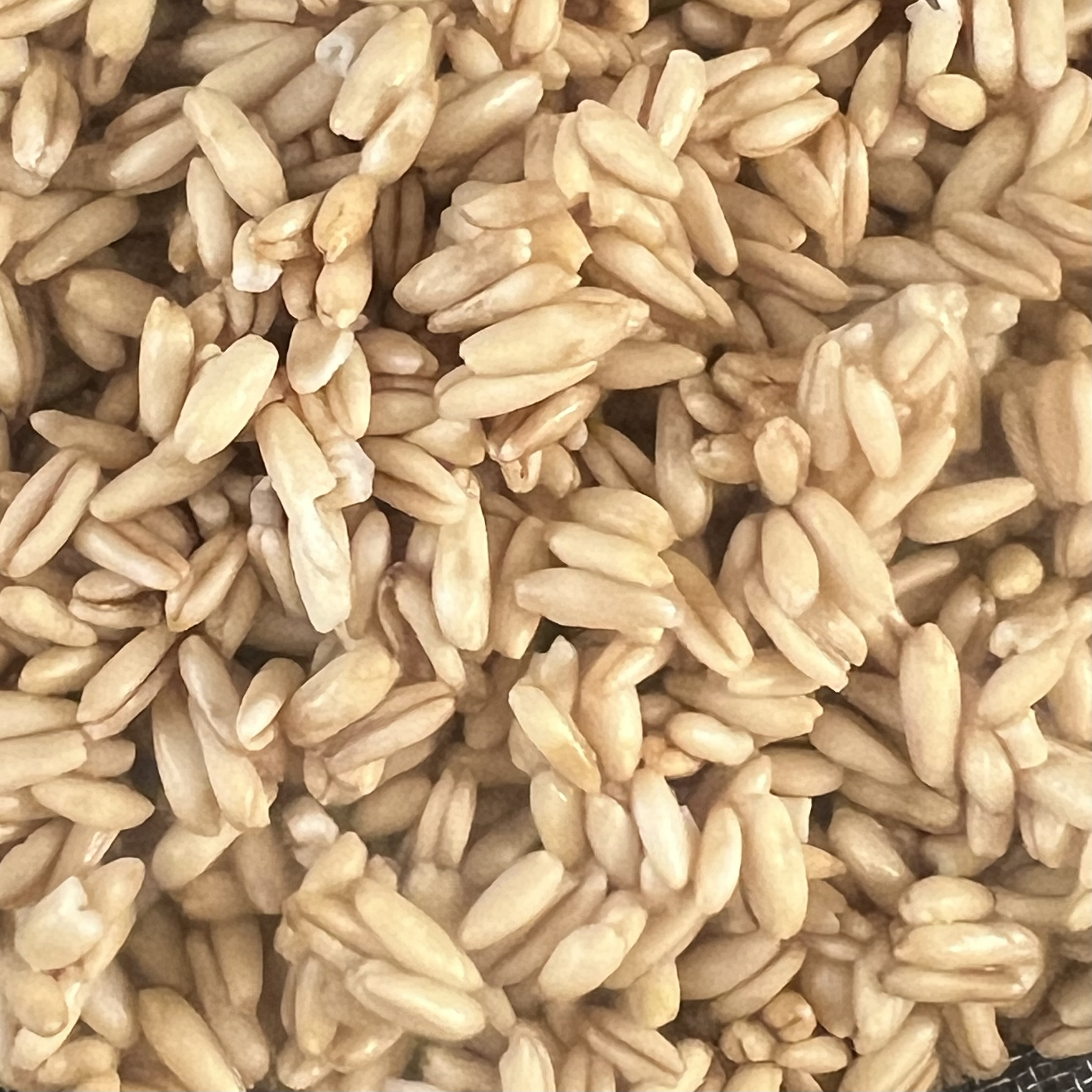
Oat groats, rinsed and soaked overnight

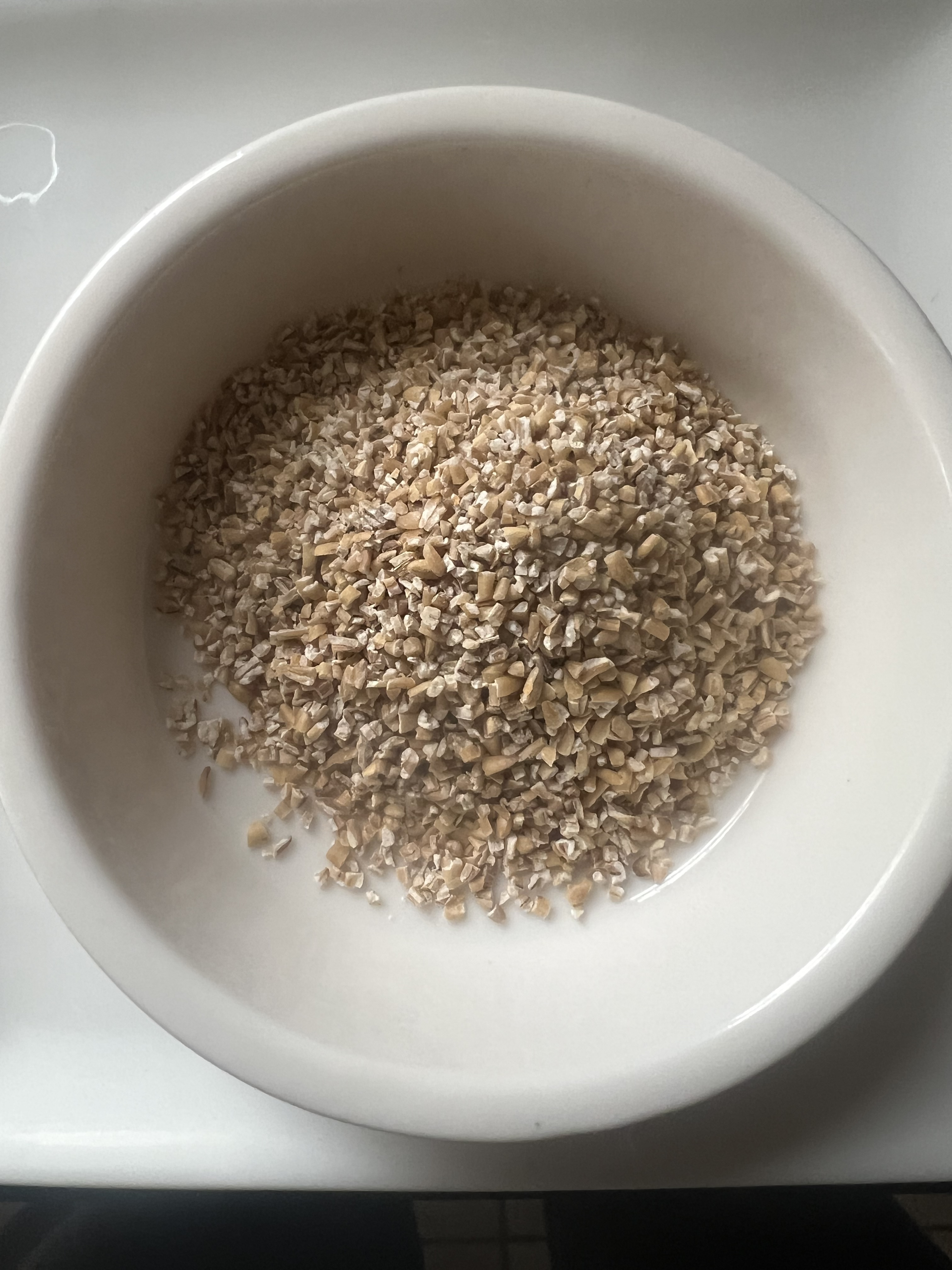
Uncooked steel-cut oats

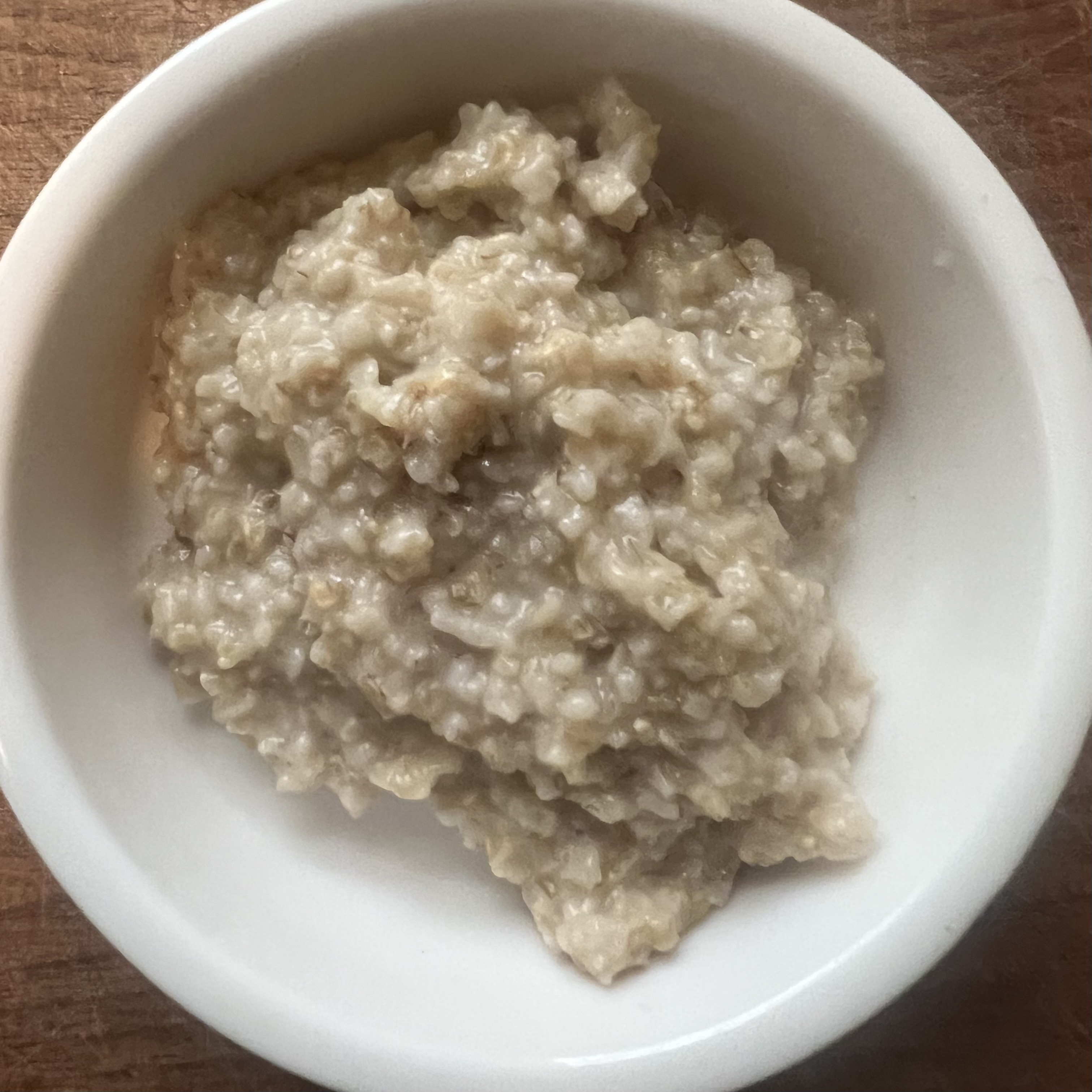
Cooked steel-cut oats

Oats for porridge may be whole (groats), cut into two or three pieces (called "pinhead", "steel-cut" or "coarse" oatmeal), ground into medium or fine oatmeal or steamed and rolled into flakes of varying sizes and thicknesses (called "rolled oats", the largest size being "jumbo"). The larger the pieces of oat used, the more textured the resulting porridge. It is said that, because of their size and shape, the body breaks steel-cut oats down more slowly than rolled oats, reducing spikes in blood sugar and making the eater feel full longer. The US Consumer Reports website found that the more cooking required, the stronger the oat flavor and the less mushy the texture.

Oats are a good source of dietary fibre; health benefits are claimed for oat bran in particular, which is part of the grain.

==== Preparation ====
The oats are cooked in milk, water or a mixture of the two. Scottish traditionalists allow only oats, water and salt. There are techniques suggested by cooks, such as presoaking, but a comparative test found little difference in the end result. Various flavourings can be used and may vary widely by taste and locality. Demerara sugar, golden syrup, Greek yoghurt and honey are common. Cold milk or single cream may be used.

=== Rice ===
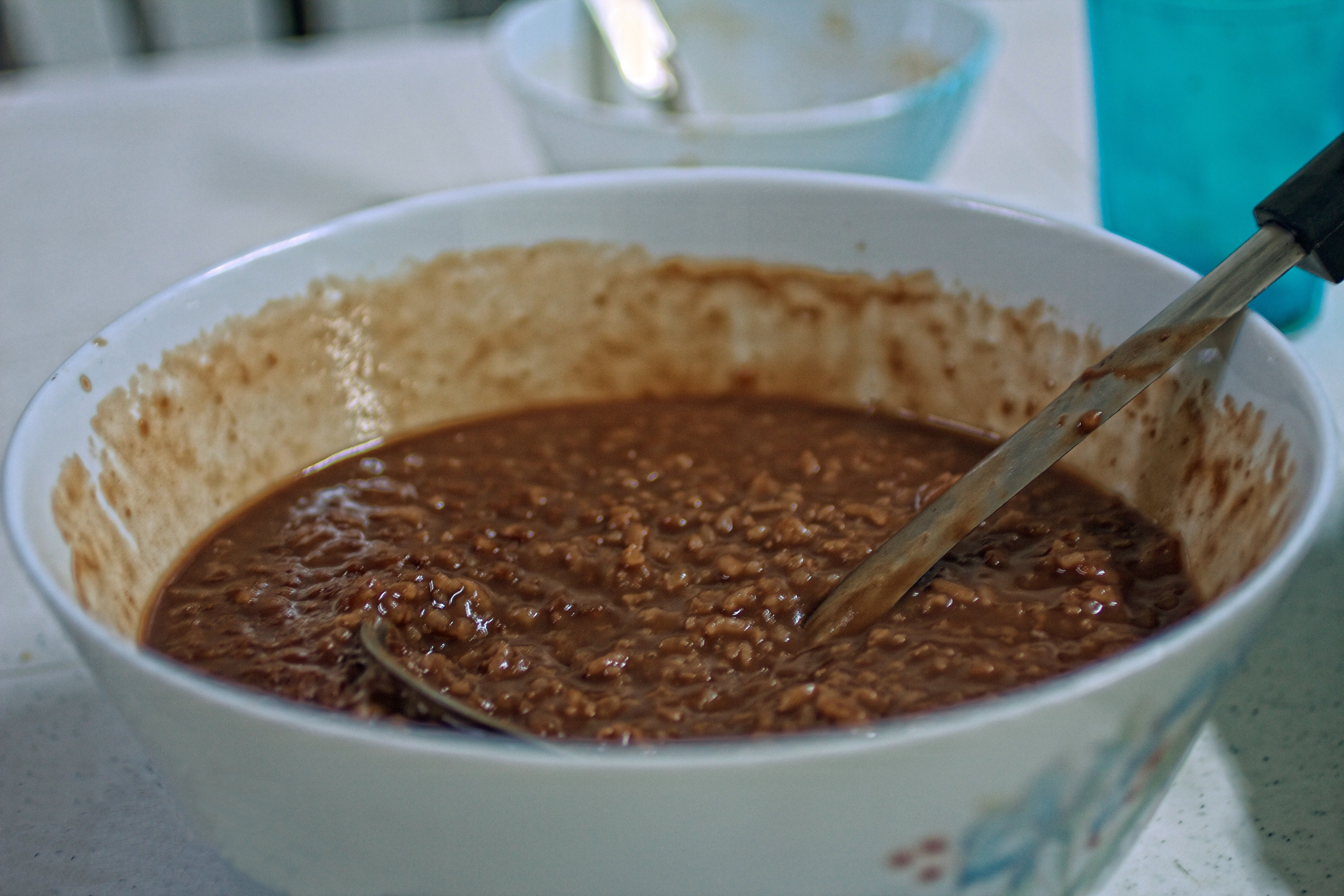
Champorado

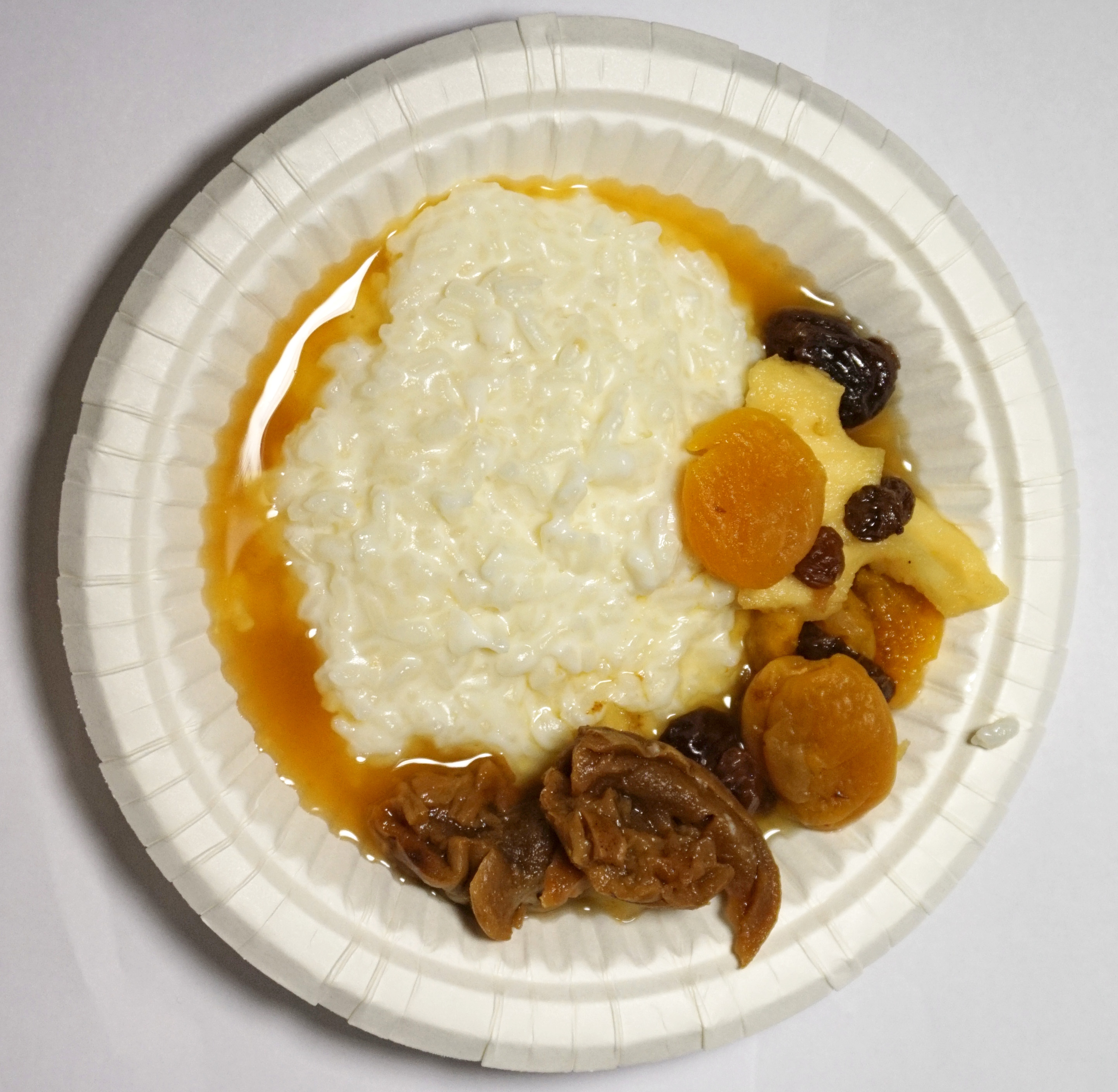
Rice porridge with mixed fruit soup

- Rice porridge:
  - Champorado, a sweet chocolate rice porridge in Filipino cuisine. It is traditionally made by boiling sticky rice with cocoa powder, giving it a distinctly brown color and usually with milk and sugar to make it taste sweeter.
  - Congee, a common East Asian, Southeast Asian and South Asian dish of boiled-down rice:
    - In Bangladesh congee is prepared simply as a porridge, Whole rice (not parboiled, scented or unscented) with a bit of salt, it is known as "Jao" eaten as wholesome diet for the sick. Added date tree sugar and garam masala it is called "Kheer", Or, cooked with sugar, milk, nuts, raisins, cardamom, cassia, cinnamon, Indian bay leaf, etc. it is called "Paiesh". Both "Kheer" & "Paiesh" are eaten as dessert.
    - In Sri Lanka congee is prepared with many ingredients. As a porridge, Sinhala people mainly use coconut milk with rice flour, it is known as "Kiriya."
    - Chinese congee, called zhou in Mandarin, and juk in Cantonese, can be served with a century egg, salted duck egg, pork, cilantro, fried wonton noodles or you tiao, deep-fried dough strips. Meiling porridge (Meiling zhou 美齡粥) made of rice, yam and soya-milk, named after Soong Mei-ling, is a classic dish of Nanjing.
    - Indonesian and Malaysian congee, called bubur, comes in many regional varieties, such as bubur sumsum, made from rice flour boiled with coconut milk then served with palm sugar sauce; and also bubur manado or tinutuan, a rice porridge mixed with various vegetables and eaten with fried salted fish and chili sauce. There is also congee made from mung beans, called bubur kacang hijau or congee with chicken called bubur ayam
    - Japanese congee, called kayu, is mixed with salt and green onions. Often accompanied with variety of foods such as tsukemono (preserved vegetables), shiokara (preserved seafoods) and so on.
    - Korean congee, called juk, can have added seafood, pine nuts, mushrooms, etc.
    - Thai congee, called "khao tom" (ข้าวต้ม), or "Jok" (โจ๊ก), can have added coriander, preserved duck eggs, fish sauce, sliced chili peppers, pickled mustard greens or salt cabbage preserves, red pepper flakes, etc.
    - Vietnamese congee, called cháo, can be made with beef or chicken stock and contains fish sauce and ginger. It is often served with scallions and fried sticks of bread.
    - Filipino congee, called lugaw or arroz caldo, contains saffron, ginger and sometimes meat. Less common ingredients include boiled eggs, pepper, chilies, puto, lumpiang toge, tofu, fish sauce, calamansi sauce, toyo and spring onions. It is common as a street food.
  - Cream of Rice, a brand of American rice porridge, boiled in milk or water with sugar or salt.
  - Rice Pudding (UK and Ireland) is a traditional dessert typically made with high-starch short-grained rice sold as "pudding rice". Ambrosia Creamed Rice is a popular a UK brand of tinned rice dessert, made of rice, sugar and milk/cream, since 1937. It is often flavoured with vanilla, cinnamon or nutmeg and served with jam
  - Payasam, a traditional Indian sweet dish, made of rice boiled in milk.
  - Frescarelli, an Italian dish made of overcooked rice and white flour, typical of Marche.
  - Orez în lapte (Romania), a dessert made with rice boiled in milk with sugar, sometimes flavored with cinnamon, jam, cocoa powder, etc.
  - Tejberizs (Hungary), made with milk, sugar and usually vanilla. Served with cocoa and sugar
  - Risengrynsgrøt or simply risgrøt (Scandinavia), a warm dish made with white rice cooked in milk. Served with cinnamon, sugar, and a small knob of butter.
  - Riskrem or rice cream dessert (Scandinavia), traditional dessert during the Christmas season. Made with cold rice porridge mixed with whipped cream and sweetened with sugar. In Sweden, sometimes mixed with oranges. In Denmark, it is typically mixed with vanilla and chopped almonds, and typically served with hot or chilled cherry sauce. In Norway, the dessert is served with chilled strawberry or raspberry sauce.

=== Sorghum ===
- Sorghum porridge:
  - Tolegi, a sorghum porridge eaten as a midday meal during the summer in New Guinea.

=== Wheat ===
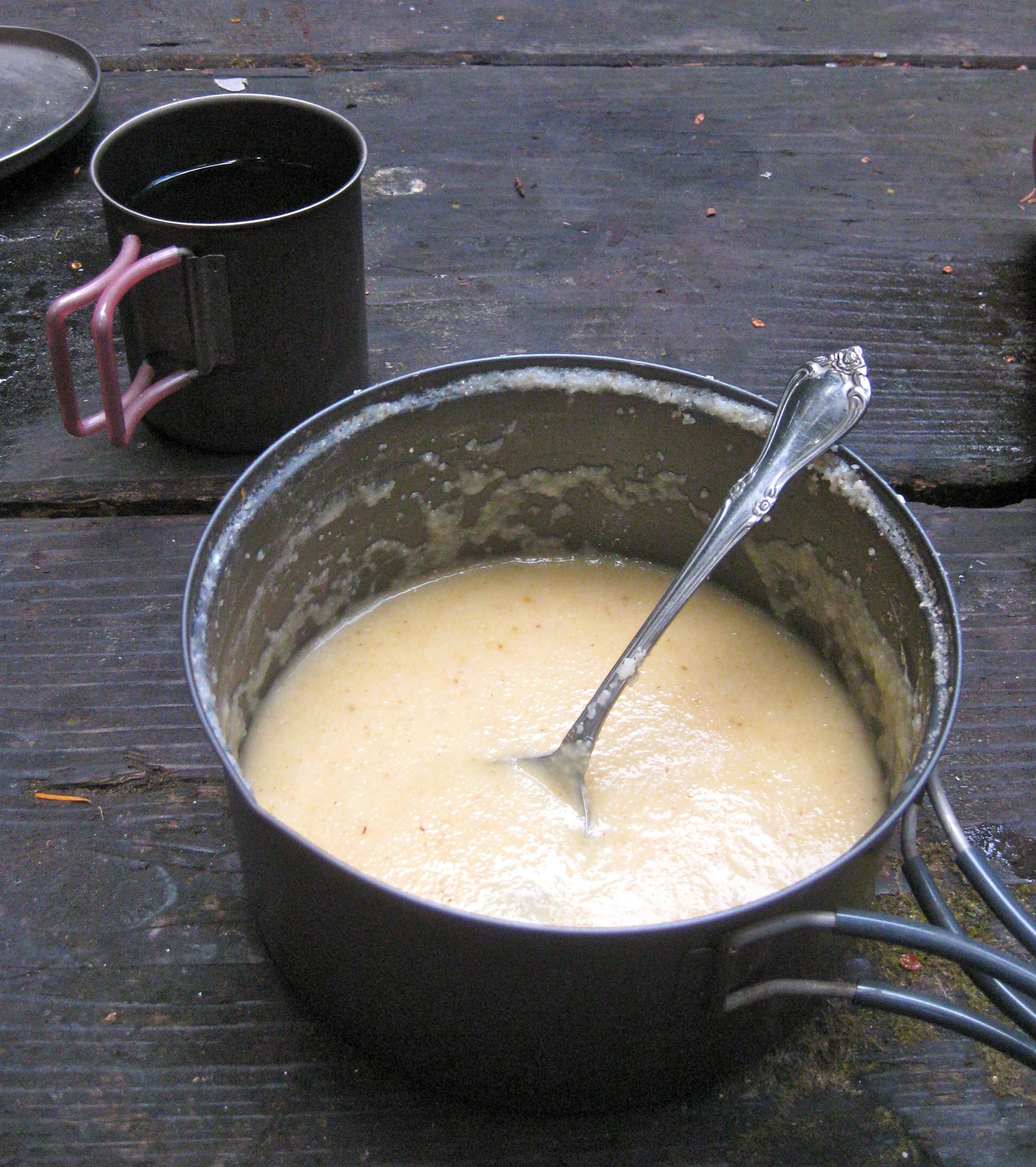
Mug of coffee with a camping saucepan of Malt-O-Meal cereal at a picnic table

- Wheat porridge:
  - Cream of Wheat, a brand of American wheat porridge, boiled in milk or water with sugar or salt; also called farina or "hot cereal" (a term also applied to oat porridge).
  - Dalia, a simple porridge made out of cracked wheat, is a common breakfast in northern India and Pakistan. It is cooked in milk or water and eaten with salt or sugar added.
  - Frumenty, a boiled wheat porridge eaten in Roman times, sometimes with fruit or meat added.
  - Gris cu lapte (Romania), dessert made with semolina boiled in milk with sugar added, sometimes flavored with jam, raisins, dried fruit, cinnamon powder, etc.
  - Tejbegríz (Hungary), semolina dessert cooked with milk, usually with sugar and topped with cocoa or cinnamon powder, etc.
  - Malt-O-Meal – a brand of American wheat porridge
  - Mannapuuro, a traditional Finnish dessert made with semolina.
  - Semolina porridge, eaten in Czech Republic, Croatia, Russia, and Slovakia, is made of milk, semolina and sugar. In France, semolina may be cooked without sugar but served instead with a large spoon of jam on top or in the centre of the bowl, that may be swirled through the dish prior to consuming it.
  - Sour cream porridge, a Norwegian porridge of wheat flour in cooked sour cream with a very smooth and slightly runny texture. It is served with sugar, cinnamon, cured meats or even hard-boiled eggs depending on local custom.
  - Upma, a fried semolina porridge traditional in southern India, flavored with clarified butter, fried onions, toasted mustard seeds and curry leaves and often mixed with vegetables and other foods, such as potatoes, fried dried red chilis, fried cauliflower and toasted peanuts or cashew nuts.
  - Velvet porridge or butter porridge, a Norwegian dish: a generous amount of white roux is made from wheat flour and butter, adding milk until it can be served as a thick porridge.
  - Wheatena, a brand name for a whole-wheat porridge.
  - Ýarma, a Turkmen wheat groat porridge.
  - Harees, an Arabian dish of boiled, cracked or coarsely-ground wheat and meat or chicken. Its consistency varies between a porridge and a dumpling. Harees is also a popular dish in Arab states of the Persian Gulf, Armenia, and Pakistan.

=== Other ===
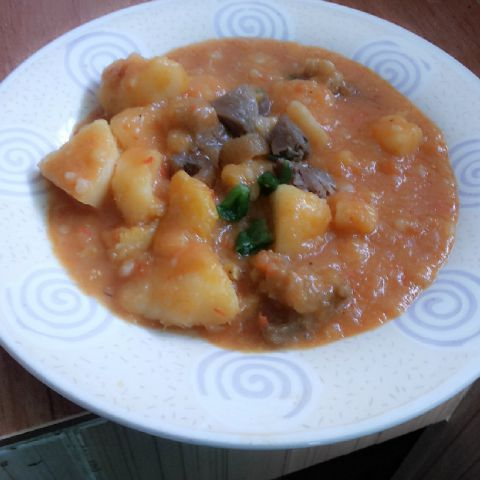
Nigerian Asaro (Yam porridge with beef and red and green pepper)

- Brenntar, made of a specially roasted flour (Musmehl). Particularly prominent in the Swabian Jura and in the Allgäu.
- Flax porridge, often served as part of a mixture with wheat and rye meal. Red River Cereal and Sunny Boy Cereal are common brands in Canada.
- Garri, flour made from cassava root, can be soaked in water or milk, and is popular as a snack in West Africa.
- Kasha, a widely consumed groats/porridge range of dishes, utilising a variety of grains, widespread in Eastern Europe and Russia.
  - English speakers frequently reserve the term "kasha" for buckwheat porridge, made of buckwheat in butter, as eaten by many people in Russia and Ukraine, with yoghurt more common in the Caucasus.
  - Terci de hrișcă, buckwheat porridge from Romania.
- Mixed grain and legumes in Ethiopia:
  - Genfo is a thick porridge made by lightly roasting, milling and cooking any combination of Ethiopian oats, wheat, barley, sorghum, millet, maize, chickpeas, yellow peas, soybeans, or bulla, the starch from the root of the false banana tree; it is traditionally eaten for breakfast with a dollop of clarified, spiced butter (kibe) or oil and chili-spice mix berbere, or with yoghurt. For those who can afford it, it is a popular holiday or Sunday breakfast dish and is often given to pregnant women and women after birthing to bring them back to health and strength.
  - Atmit, muk or adja is a thinner version of genfo porridge for drinking, mixed often with spiced, clarified butter, milk and honey, or on its own with a pinch of salt. It is popular in the rainy season and for nursing the sick back to health.
  - Besso, made of roasted and ground barley is a popular snack for travellers and, in olden times, foot soldiers. The powder is either mixed with a bit of water, salt and chili powder to make a thick bread-like snack or mixed with more water or milk and honey for drinking. The Gurage and other southern tribes in Ethiopia ferment the besso for a few days with water and a bit of sugar, add a pinch of salt and chili and drink it as a fortifying and energising meal-in-a-drink.
- Multigrain Porridge
  - This consists of roasted rice, wheat, roasted gram, jowar, maize, millet, groundnut, cashewnut, corn, barley and ragi and is prepared by roasting all the ingredients individually in a pan without using any ghee or oil, then grinding them together into a coarse powder.
  - This porridge is described as being rich in protein and good for children.
- Pease porridge or peasemeal porridge, made from dried peas, is a traditional English and Scottish porridge.
- Potato porridge, eaten in Norway, is a thick, almost solid paste made from cooked potatoes mixed with milk and barley.
  - Helmipuuro ("pearl porridge") is a porridge made from grains of potato starch swelled in milk into ca. five-mm "pearls", traditionally found in Russia and Finland.
- Quinoa porridge.
- Rye porridge:
  - Rugmelsgrød, a traditional dinner of the Danish island Bornholm, made of ryemeal and water.
  - Ruispuuro, a traditional Finnish breakfast.
- Spelt porridge.
- Tsampa is a toasted grain flour, usually barley, eaten in Tibet, often mixed with tea and butter.
- Yam porridge/pottage
  - In Nigeria the words porridge and pottage are synonymous, and it is consumed as a main meal. Nigerian Asaro, yam porridge/pottage, includes tomatoes and other culinary vegetables along with the yam. It may also have fish or other meat.

== History ==
Historically, porridge was a staple food in much of the world, including Europe, Africa and Asia, and it remains so in many countries. There is archaeological evidence of porridge in Denmark from 4200 B.C. or earlier, and it became commonplace in societies that practiced grain cultivation from the Neolithic period onward.

Oat porridge has traditionally been particularly associated with Scotland, possibly because oats can be successfully cultivated on marginal upland soils. Oats were introduced to Scotland in about 600 AD; traces of barley porridge have been found in pots excavated in the Outer Hebrides which have been dated to 2,500 years ago.

=== Northern Europe ===
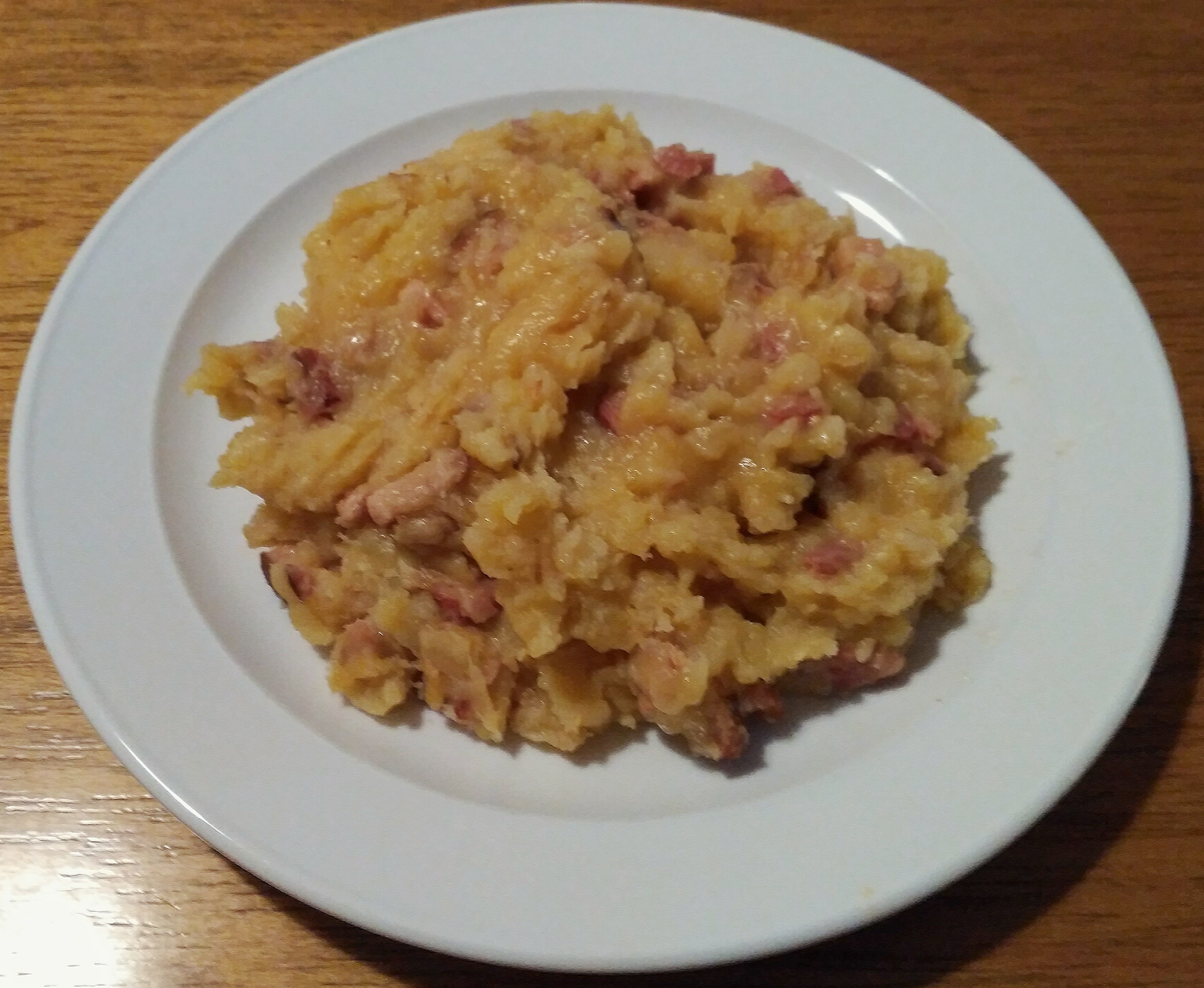
Traditional Estonian rustic porridge Mulgipuder made with potatoes, groats and meat is known as a national dish of Estonia.

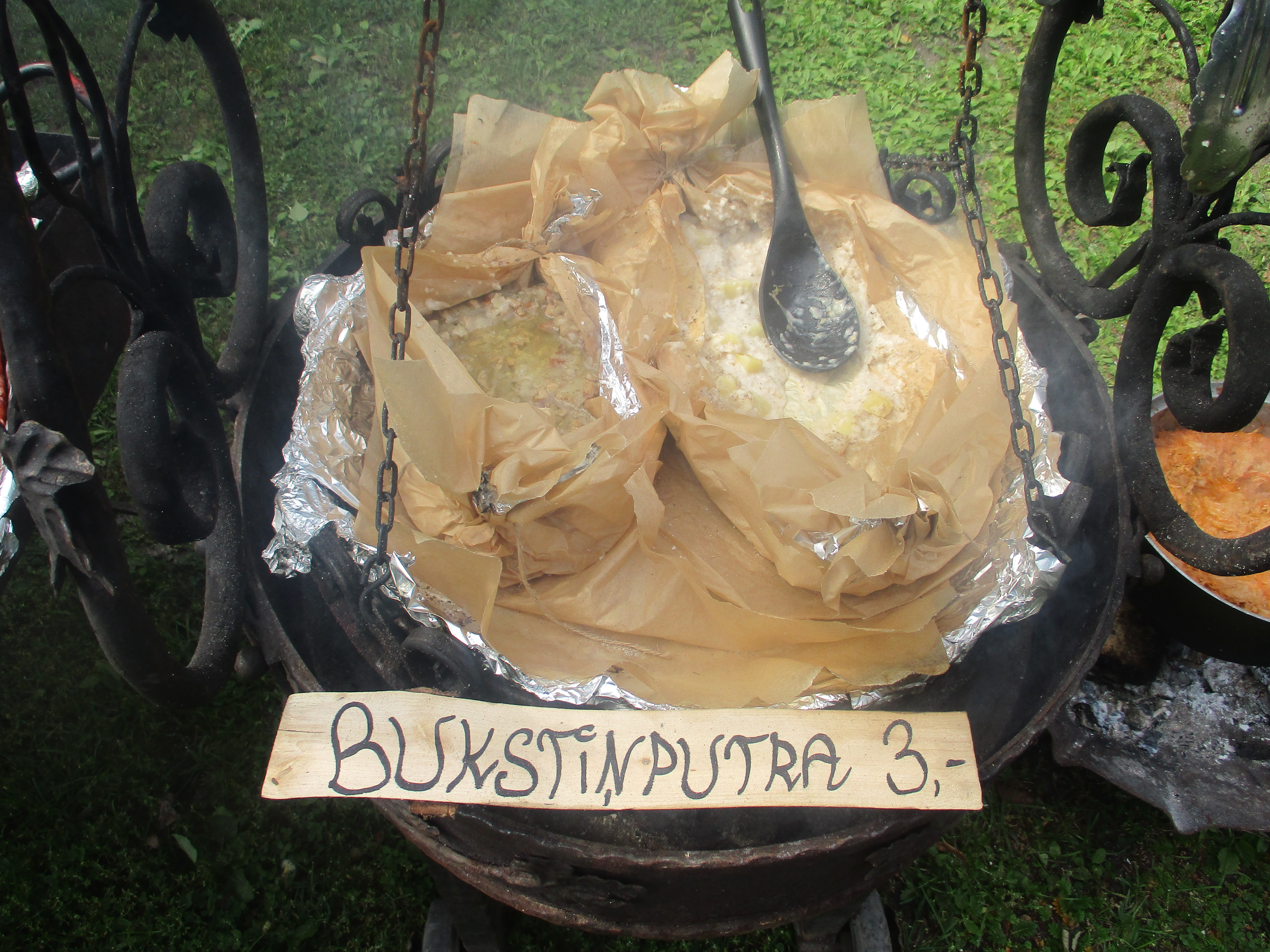
Traditional Latvian barley grit porridge with milk, potatoes and speck (bukstiņputra)

Historically, porridge was a staple food in much of Northern Europe and Russia. It was often made from barley, though other grains and yellow peas could be used, depending on local conditions. It was primarily a savoury dish, with meats, root crops, vegetables and herbs added for flavor. Porridge could be cooked in a large metal kettle over hot coals or heated in a cheaper earthenware container by adding hot stones until boiling hot. Until leavened bread and baking ovens became commonplace in Europe, porridge was a typical means of preparing cereal crops for the table.

Porridge was also commonly provided for breakfast for inmates in the British prison system, and so "doing porridge" became a slang term for a sentence in prison.

== See also ==
- Asida, from the Arabian cuisine
- Barley gruel
- Congee, a rice porridge common across Asia
- Krentjebrij, a traditional Dutch porridge-like dessert
- List of porridges
- Macroom Oatmeal, the last traditionally stone-ground oatmeal in Ireland
- Pease pudding, also known as pease porridge
- Quaker Oats, large multinational manufacturer, suppliers of Quaker Oats, Quaker Instant Oatmeal, etc.
- Ready Brek, a British brand of instant shredded oat cereal
- Scott's Porage Oats, a Scottish brand producing porridge sold nationally in the UK.
- Stoats Porridge Bars, a Scottish brand comprising porridge bars, organic porridge, oats, health food and oat bars.
- Swallow
- Tapioca pudding
- African cuisine
- List of African dishes
