= Get Some Fun =

Studio album by Sunnyboys
- Released: April 1984
- Recorded: May–October 1983
- Studios: Ridge Farm Studios, The Town House; London, England
- Genres: Power pop; alternative rock
- Label: Mushroom
- Producers: Nick Garvey, Sunnyboys

Sunnyboys chronology
Individuals (1982)	Get Some Fun (1984)	Sunnyboys Real Live (1984)

Singles from Get Some Fun
- 1. "Show Me Some Discipline" Released: June 1983; 2. "Love in a Box" Released: March 1984; 3. "Comes As No Surprise" Released: May 1984

Get Some Fun is the third studio album by the Australian power pop group, Sunnyboys. It was produced by Nick Garvey, formerly of The Motors and released in April 1984 on Mushroom Records. It peaked at No. 36 on the Australian Kent Music Report albums chart, and like all of the band's first three albums has come to be regarded as a classic of its time.

== Background ==
For this album, the band hired new management in the form of Michael Chugg and in May 1983 Sunnyboys returned to the studio to record a new single, "Show Me Some Discipline" which possessed a darker soul to the band's previous fare. Get Some Fun was released in April 1984. All ten songs were recent creations with the exception of "Catch My Heart," which had been around since the band's inception.

== Track listing ==
All tracks are written by Jeremy Oxley unless otherwise shown.

Side A
No.	Title	Length
1.	"Show Me Some Discipline"	3:59
2.	"Lovers (On Another Planet's Hell)"	3:21
3.	"Love in a Box"	3:21
4.	"Afraid to Love"	4:10
5.	"Come As No Surprise"	4:18

Side B
No.	Title	Writer(s)	Length
1.	"Get Some Fun"		3:28
2.	"Catch My Heart"		2:35
3.	"The Stooge"	Peter Oxley	4:46
4.	"Work In Moderation"		3:28
5.	"Cat Walk"	Sunnyboys	5:04

2015 Reissue
No.	Title	Writer(s)	Length
1.	"Show Me Some Discipline"		3:59
2.	"Lovers (On Another Planet's Hell)"		3:21
3.	"Love in a Box"		3:21
4.	"Afraid to Love"		4:10
5.	"Come As No Surprise"		4:18
6.	"Get Some Fun"		3:28
7.	"Catch My Heart"		2:35
8.	"The Stooge"	Phil Oxley	4:46
9.	"Work In Moderation"		3:28
10.	"Cat Walk"	Sunnyboys	5:04
11.	"The Idealist"
12.	"Bottom of My Heart"
13.	"Safe Life"
14.	"Strange Cohesion" (live)
15.	"Comes As No Surprise" (Live at Narara '84)
16.	"Lovers (On Another Planet's Hell)" (Live at Narara '84)
17.	"This Is Real" (Live at Narara '84)
18.	"The Stooge" (Live at Narara '84)
19.	"Alone With You" (Live at Narara '84)

== Charts ==
Chart (1984)	Peak position
Australia Kent Music Report Album Chart	36

== Release history ==
Date	Region	Label	Format	Catalogue
April 1984	Australia	Mushroom	LP	RML 53129
14 October 1997	Australia	Mushroom	CD	MUSH32358.2
6 March 2015	Australia	Feel Presents	CD / DD	FEEL 014

== Personnel ==
Sunnyboys

- Bil Bilson – drums
- Richard Burgman – guitar
- Jeremy Oxley – guitar, vocals
- Peter Oxley – bass guitar
