= Wildcat (album) =

Studio album by Sunnyboys
- Released: August 1989
- Studio: Rich Studios, Sydney
- Genre: Rock; pop; alternative rock
- Label: RCA
- Producer: Garth Porter

Sunnyboys chronology
Sunnyboys Real Live (1984)	Wildcat (1989)	Play the Best (1991)

Singles from Wildcat
- 1. "Too Young to Despair" Released: December 1988; 2. "Sinful Me" Released: June 1989; 3. "Sad Girl" Released: September 1989; 4. "Sorrow Is Mine" Released: March 1990

Wildcat is the fourth and final studio album by the Australian power pop group, Sunnyboys. It was released in August 1989 on RCA Records, and peaked at No. 63 on the Australian ARIA Albums Chart.

== Background ==
Sunnyboys were formed in 1980 and released three studio albums until their split in 1984. In 1987, member Jeremy Oxley subsequently reformed a version of The Sunnyboys with himself as the only original member and released Wildcat. This version of Sunnyboys disbanded in 1990.

== Track listing ==
All tracks are written by Jeremy Oxley.

Side A
No.	Title	Length
1.	"Sorrow Is Mine"
2.	"Too Young to Despair"
3.	"As I Walk"
4.	"New Confusion"
5.	"Lately"

Side B
No.	Title	Length
1.	"Sinful Me"
2.	"Sad Girl"
3.	"I'm Changing"
4.	"Certain Privilege"
5.	"Wildcat and the Loon"

== Personnel ==
Sunnyboys

- Jeremy Oxley – guitar, vocals
- Cathy Ogden – backing vocals
- Mary Azzopardi – backing vocals
- Phil Smith – bass
- Peter Hincenbergs – drums
- Nick Freedman – guitar
- Timothy Freedman – keyboard
- David Steele – mandolin

== Charts ==
Chart (1989)	Peak position
Australian Albums (ARIA)	63

== Release history ==
Date	Region	Label	Format	Catalogue
August 1989	Australia	RCA Records	LP, CD	VPL 1 0806
