= Sunnyboys (album) =

Studio album by Sunnyboys
- Released: September 1981
- Recorded: May–July 1981; Alberts Studios, Sydney
- Genres: Power pop; alternative rock
- Label: Mushroom
- Producer: Lobby Loyde

Sunnyboys chronology
Sunnyboys (1981)	Individuals (1982)

Singles from Sunnyboys
- 1. "Happy Man" Released: June 1981; 2. "Alone with You" Released: October 1981

Sunnyboys is the debut studio album by the Australian power pop group of the same name. It was released in September 1981 on Mushroom Records, which peaked at No. 13 on the Australian Kent Music Report albums chart.

For the album the group's line-up was Bil Bilson on drums, Richard Burgman on guitar, Jeremy Oxley on guitar and vocals, and his older brother, Peter Oxley, on bass guitar. It was recorded at Alberts Studios in Sydney between May and July 1981 with Lobby Loyde as producer. Two singles were released from the album: "Happy Man" (June 1981) and a new, re-recorded version of "Alone with You from their debut Phantom Records EP, from their (October) – both reached the top 30 on the Kent Music Report singles chart. However, Jeremy thought it was unfair to include "Happy Man" on the album, so in September 1981 they released a limited-edition version of the album, replacing that song with "Tell Me What You Say", recorded during the album sessions.

In October 2010 Sunnyboys was listed at No. 37 in the book, 100 Best Australian Albums. On 14 March 2014 the group issued an expanded 2× CD version, which reached the ARIA Albums Chart top 100.

== Background ==
Sunnyboys was recorded by the group of the same name, which had formed in Sydney in July 1980 by the brothers, Peter (bass guitar) and Jeremy Oxley (guitar and vocals), together with Bil Bilson (drums) and Richard Burgman (guitar). Their first public performance occurred on 15 August 1980, two months after formation. Within a few weeks the quartet were playing on an almost nightly basis at venues across Sydney’s pub and club circuit. Among the band’s early fans was Jules Normington, the label owner of Phantom Records, who arranged for the band to make their first recording in October that year with the producer, Lobby Loyde (ex-Aztecs, Coloured Balls). The resulting self-titled 4-track 7-inch EP was released in December. The initial pressing of 1,000 copies was sold out in two weeks. The EP was later remixed and reissued as a 12-inch EP.

In February 1981 Sunnyboys became the first Sydney-based band to sign with Mushroom Records. From May they started recording Sunnyboys at Alberts Studio with Loyde producing again. Their first release in June, on that label, was the lead single, "Happy Man", from the album which debuted at No. 26 on the Kent Music Report singles chart on 6 July.

In a later interview with Mess+Noise, Burgman commented on how the inspiration for the songs on the album had come from Jeremy's previous experiences, stating "It's very much a teenager's record, I think if you look at that first album in that light, the songs on the record are just stories." Peter concluded that in hindsight the songs on the record betray Jeremy's troubled soul. "At the time I knew that they were great lyrics, but you were concentrating on the music, and you didn't look at the lyrics as a 19-year-old in terms of how intense and deeply personal they were. Truly in hindsight you think, 'Oh my goodness, these lyrics Jeremy was writing were truly very heartfelt and soulful'. They were his real feelings at the time. They weren't third-party storytelling, they were real heart-on-the-sleeve stuff. The lyrics are incredible now when you're listening to them. I think the longevity of the songs really does relate to the intensity of those lyrics."

The album was released in September 1981 by Mushroom Records on vinyl, together with a limited release of 2,000 on yellow vinyl (this version had a slightly different track listing with "Happy Man" replaced with "Tell Me What You Say". The album peaked at No. 13 on the national Kent Music Report album chart in October. A second single, a new re-recorded version of "Alone with You" (an earlier version had been previously included on the band's 1980 self-titled EP), was released in October reaching No. 28 on the national singles chart.

The album was certified gold status (shipment of 35,000 units) soon after its release and, in 2004, platinum accreditation (70,000 units). As from February 2014, the sales figures for the album are around the 100,000 mark.

On 14 March 2014 the group issued an expanded two-CD edition. The first disc contains the original 12-track album followed by the eight tracks from the same recording session that were not included on the original release. The second disc, "New Kicks", contains the complete pre-recording demo session. Later that month the album returned to the Australian national top 100 on the ARIA Albums Chart, (which had replaced the Kent Music Report in 1989). It also reached No. 58 on the ARIA Top 100 Physical Albums Chart and No. 12 on the ARIA Catalogue Albums Chart.

== Critical reception ==
Garry Raffaele of The Canberra Times reviewed Sunnyboys in October 1981 and felt that "'Happy Man', the single, is still, in my view, their best. Closely followed by 'Alone with You'." He continued, that they are "a band breaking out of mediocrity and forcing its strong sound, good, urgent rock. I believe it needs to consolidate now – and that means the next album is important." Australian musicologist, Ian McFarlane, in 1999 opined that "It remains an Australian rock classic, an album brimming with infectious, danceable R&B-spiced rock'n'roll, impassioned, dynamic songs, a marvellously lighthearted disposition and lashings of youthful exuberance."

FasterLouder's Anton, in September 2004, believes "every self-respecting Australian music lover needs to own the Sunnyboys' debut, self-titled album. It's a flawless 40 minutes of electrified, passionate pop rock, combining the male angst of the Violent Femmes' first album, the melodic sensibilities of Crowded House, and The Saints' ability to rock the fuck out." He states that the "album is almost disconcertingly beautiful, delivering loneliness, alienation and lost hope sung by singer/guitarist Jeremy Oxley and backed by a ludicrously tight band. Oxley's lyrics were acutely accurate explorations of the male psyche."

Craig Mathieson in 100 Best Australian Albums (October 2010) describes the album as "a stunning work of guitar pop/rock minimalism.", stating "the album hotwires the youthful exuberance and anxiety of Jeremy's songs and delivers them with a visceral powerpop attack, with melodies and harmonies to die for." Mathieson goes on to state "Sunnyboys is as infectious as Ebola." and "Every song is a potential single from the moody 'Liar' and 'Let You Go' to the frenetic, hip-shaking 'It's Not Me' and 'Tunnel of Love' to the album's closing track and pièce de résistance 'I'm Shakin''."

In December 2012 Martin Boulton in the Sydney Morning Herald stated that "the album evokes feelings of lightness and overwhelming joy, while exploring themes of loneliness and alienation." Peter Oxley commented that "I was conscious [at the time] that they were good lyrics, but not conscious of the depth and how soulful they were for Jeremy." In an album review from March 2014 on TheMusic.com.au, Dan Condon states it is "track after track of guitar pop perfection, each song possibly better than the last, with Jeremy Oxley a self-assured but unassuming leading voice."

== Track listing ==
All tracks are written by Jeremy Oxley unless otherwise shown

Side A
No.	Title	Writer(s)	Length
1.	"I Can't Talk to You"		2:38
2.	"My Only Friend"		3:29
3.	"Trouble in My Brain"		3:49
4.	"Gone"	Peter Oxley	3:45
5.	"It's Not Me"		3:08
6.	"Happy Man" ("Tell Me What you Say" replaced "Happy Man" on the limited edition version, pressed on yellow vinyl.)		3:01

Side B
No.	Title	Writer(s)	Length
1.	"Alone with You"		4:05
2.	"Tunnel of Love"		3:18
3.	"Liar"		4:05
4.	"Let You Go"	Jeremy Oxley, Peter Oxley	4:40
5.	"I'm Shakin'"		4:16
6.	"I Can't Talk to You" (Reprise)		0:18

All tracks are written by Jeremy Oxley unless otherwise shown

CD1: Sunnyboys (Complete Alberts Sessions)
No.	Title	Writer(s)	Length
1.	"I Can't Talk to You"		2:38
2.	"My Only Friend"		3:29
3.	"Trouble in My Brain"		3:49
4.	"Gone"	Peter Oxley	3:45
5.	"It's Not Me"		3:08
6.	"Happy Man"		3:01
7.	"Alone with You"		4:05
8.	"Tunnel of Love"		3:18
9.	"Liar"		4:05
10.	"Let You Go"	Jeremy Oxley, Peter Oxley	4:40
11.	"I'm Shakin'"		4:16
12.	"I Can't Talk to You" (Reprise)		0:18
13.	"Tell Me What You Say"		3:44
14.	"Tomorrow Will Be Fine"		2:12
15.	"Stop & Think"		2:21
16.	"To the Bone"		2:14
17.	"Physical Jerk"		2:51
18.	"Guts of Iron"		3:51
19.	"Thrill" (live)	Jeremy Oxley, Peter Oxley	3:18
20.	"Why Do I Cry?" (live)	Barry Tashian	2:59

All tracks are written by Jeremy Oxley unless otherwise shown

CD2: New Kicks (Complete and Unreleased Pre-Album Demo Session)
No.	Title	Writer(s)	Length
1.	"New Kicks"		2:43
2.	"Tomorrow Will Be Fine"		2:14
3.	"Want to Be Alone"		2:43
4.	"Guts of Iron"		3:41
5.	"Physical Jerk"		2:53
6.	"Individuals"		4:57
7.	"Catch My Heart"		2:37
8.	"Strategy Idol"		2:46
9.	"Happy Man"		3:05
10.	"Let You Go"	Peter Oxley	4:53
11.	"I'm Shakin'"		4:22
12.	"My Only Friend"		3:26
13.	"Thrill"		3:05
14.	"Tunnel of Love"		3:07
15.	"Gone"	Peter Oxley	3:58
16.	"I Can't Talk to You"		2:28
17.	"Don't Want You"		2:30

== Charts ==
Chart (1981)	Peak position
Australia Kent Music Report Album Chart	13

== Release history ==
Date	Region	Label	Format	Catalogue
September 1981	Australia	Mushroom	LP	L37696
September 1981	Australia	Mushroom	Limited Edition Yellow Vinyl	L-37634
1991	Australia	Mushroom	CD	D19478
14 October 1997	Australia	Mushroom	CD	MUSH32360.2
14 March 2014	Australia	Festival Records	2×CD, digital download	FEST601026
1 November 2019	Australia	Warner Music Australia	Limited Edition Light Blue Vinyl	5419705525

== Credits ==
Sunnyboys

- Bil Bilson – drums
- Richard Burgman – guitar
- Jeremy Oxley – guitar, vocals
- Peter Oxley – bass guitar

Additional musicians

- Steve Harris – keyboards ("Trouble in My Brain", "Gone", "It's Not Me")

Production

- Col Freeman – engineer
- Brent Legge – photography
- Lobby Loyde – producer
- Peel – cover design
