= Sunny Boy Cereal =

Brand of porridge

Sunny Boy Cereal is a porridge or hot cereal made of wheat, rye, and flax, produced in Camrose, Alberta, Canada. Sunny Boy Cereal is often consumed with the addition of brown sugar and cream.

The makers of Sunny Boy Cereal produce a variety of other products as well including conventional and organic flours, pancake mixes and additional grain based food products.

== History ==
Brothers Walter and Edgar Byers moved to Camrose, Alberta from Nova Scotia in 1926 and started Byers Flour Mills.In 1929 Byers Flour Mills developed a new hot cereal using locally grown wheat, rye, and flax and called it Sunny Boy Cereal. In 1939 it was exhibited at the Edmonton Exhibition with a model of the Camrose manufacturing facility made out of Sunny Boy Cereal's red and white boxes.

In 1991 Byers Flour Mills was sold to the Alberta Wheat Pool and the plant operated under the name "Prairie Sun Grains". In 1998 the Alberta Wheat Pool merged with the Manitoba Wheat Pool to form Agricore Cooperative Ltd. In 2000 Agricore sold the Prairie Sun Grain and Sunny Boy brands to Calgary food broker Pat Maloney. The sale did not include the mill but Maloney continued to use the facility until a new mill owner is found.

In 2003, Prairie Sun Grains 2000 Ltd. and Camrose Milling Company Inc. were placed in receivership. It was operated under the name Schroeder Milling Ltd. In 2007 Patricia and Brad Shapka purchased the Sunny Boy brand and the Camrose mill. and created Sunny Boy Foods Ltd. of Edmonton to produce hot cereal, flours and pancake mixes.

== Packaging ==
Over the years, the packaging of Sunny Boy Cereal for retail sales has evolved.

The original iconic cardboard box was updated when it became necessary to show both imperial and metric weights on all packaging and again when imperial weights from packaging were removed completely. Eventually cardboard boxes were replaced by resealable plastic pouches.

== Popularity ==
The Western Producer called Sunny Boy Cereal "the breakfast cereal that started the day in thousands of prairie homes since the Great Depression".
