= Happy Man (Sunnyboys song) =

- Vinyl cover art work

Single by Sunnyboys

from the album Sunnyboys
- A-side: "Happy Man"
- B-side: "Tomorrow Will be Fine"
- Released: June 1981
- Recorded: 1981; Alberts Studios, Sydney, Australia
- Genre: Power pop; post-punk
- Length: 3:01
- Label: Mushroom
- Songwriter: Jeremy Oxley
- Producer: Lobby Loyde

Sunnyboys singles chronology
"Happy Man" (1981)	"Alone with You" (1981)

"Happy Man" is a song by Australian power pop band, Sunnyboys. It was written by lead singer-guitarist, Jeremy Oxley, and was the first single released in June 1981, on Mushroom Records, from their self-titled debut album, which followed in September. The studio tracks were produced by Lobby Loyde and engineered by Colin Freeman at Alberts Studios, Sydney. "Happy Man" reached No. 26 on the Kent Music Report singles chart. The live tracks were recorded at the Bombay Rock, Brunswick.

== History ==
"Happy Man" was the first single released by Sunnyboys after signing with Mushroom Records and debuted on 6 July 1981 at No. 26 on the Kent Music Report singles chart. It remained in the charts for 14 weeks. It also reached the top ten in Sydney. It was included on their eponymous debut album, released that September. Aside from the standard 7" vinyl format it was also issued as Australia's first cassette single, which included two bonus live tracks, "Thrill" and "Why Do I Cry?" (the latter is a cover version of 1960s band the Remains' first single).

In the liner notes of the compilation album, Sunnyboys, Our Best of (December 2013), Jeremy Oxley explained, "This song was written at Watkins Street, Newtown, the second place I lived in Sydney as another exercise in pop... It wasn't written about anybody in particular. This song was chosen as the first single to be released off the album and really showcased Bil's drumming style. The film clip was made with a budget of $3,000 in a studio in Roselle – which later became Sydney College of Arts – and was directed by Tony Stevens. It was the first Sunnyboys clip to be made."

The song was one of two the band performed during a November 1998 reunion for the Mushroom 25 Live concert to celebrate the label's 25th anniversary.

On 6 March 2006 Off the Hip Records released Happy Man: Tribute to the Sunnyboys, with 18 cover versions of the group's tracks by various artists, including "Happy Man" by The Indian Givers. The Barman of I-94 Bar website found their version was a "credible take".

== Critical reception ==
Garry Raffaele of The Canberra Times reviewed Sunnyboys and felt that "'Happy Man', the single, is still, in my view, their best. Closely followed by 'Alone with You'." Australian musicologist, Ian McFarlane, described it as a "high-spirited single" which had "cracked the mainstream charts".

Craig Mathieson in 100 Best Australian Albums describes the song as having a duality with lyrics like "I think I'm swimming in a sea of doubt" in the verses counterposed by the chorus "But I'm a happy man". Mathieson goes onto state that this "confusion is all packaged in a great guitar stomp performance. These were four strong players who knew how to bring drama to a simple pop song".

In April 2012 Sunnyboys reunited and performed a gig at the Enmore Theatre, Toby Creswell noticed that the "guitars and military drum beat collide into the hit 'Happy Man', Jeremy Oxley catches his brother Peter's eye and a smile bursts across both their faces. It's as though they are transported back to the Chatswood Charles hotel in 1980."

== Track listing ==
All tracks are written by Jeremy Oxley, unless otherwise shown

7" vinyl version
No.	Title	Length
1.	"Happy Man"	3:01
2.	"Tomorrow Will Be Fine"	2:14
Total length:		5:15

All tracks are written by Jeremy Oxley, unless otherwise shown

Cassette single version
No.	Title	Length
1.	"Happy Man"	3:01
2.	"Tomorrow Will Be Fine"	2:14
3.	"Thrill (live)" (J. Oxley, Peter Oxley)	3:01
4.	"Why Do I Cry? (live)" (Barry Tashian)	3:25
Total length:		11:41

== Charts ==
Chart (1981)	Peak position
Australia Kent Music Report Singles Chart	26

== Release history ==
Region	Date	Label	Format	Catalogue
Australia	June 1981	Mushroom	7" vinyl	K8335
Australia	June 1981	Mushroom	Cassette	C12001

== Credits ==
Sunnyboys

- Bil Bilson – drums
- Richard Burgman – guitar
- Jeremy Oxley – guitar, vocals
- Peter Oxley – bass guitar

Production

- Col Freeman – engineer
- Brent Legge – photography
- Lobby Loyde – producer
- Peel – cover design
