= You Need a Friend =

- 7-inch vinyl single

Single by Sunnyboys

from the album Individuals
- A-side: "You Need a Friend"
- B-side: "No Love Around"
- Released: April 1982
- Recorded: 1982; Mandrill Studios, Auckland, New Zealand
- Genre: Alternative rock, power pop
- Length: 4:05
- Label: Mushroom
- Songwriter(s): Jeremy Oxley
- Producer(s): Lobby Loyde

Sunnyboys singles chronology
| "Alone with You" (1981) | "You Need a Friend" (1982) | "This Is Real" (1982) |

"You Need a Friend" is a song recorded by Australian power pop band, Sunnyboys. It is written by lead singer-guitarist, Jeremy Oxley, and was released in April 1982 as the lead single of the band's second studio album, Individuals. "You Need a Friend" peaked at No. 38 on the Kent Music Report singles chart.

In the liner notes of the compilation album, Sunnyboys, Our Best of (December 2013), Jeremy Oxley wrote, ""You Need a Friend" is a sort of anthem for teenagers. I looked at my own experience and around at others and we were feeling the same thing. We all wanted a good time, not to be hassled. It was, and still is, a hard time in life. You are trying to find yourself and grow but wanting to do it in your own way - not how everybody is telling you how you should be." adding the film was filmed on his back verandah.

== Track listing ==
7" vinyl

- Side A "You Need a Friend" - 4:05
- Side B "No Love Around" - 3:20

== Charts ==
| Chart (1982) | Peak position |
|---|---|
| Australia Kent Music Report Singles Chart | 38 |

== Release history ==
| Region | Date | Label | Format | Catalogue |
|---|---|---|---|---|
| Australia | April 1982 | Mushroom | 7" vinyl | K-8683 |
