= Sunnyboy =

Brand of flavoured ice block

The Sunnyboy was a popular Australian brand of flavoured ice block, well known for its distinctive tetrahedral shape (a design called a tetra-pak), sold individually or in packs. The ice blocks were extremely popular all the way through to the early 1990s, being cheaply available throughout tuckshops, discount stores and milk bars across most Australian states.

In 1980, the Australian rock band the Sunnyboys were established, with the ice block as their namesake, to represent "bright, happy, young, fun". In March 2013, comedian Dave O'Neil suggested that the company could ask the Sunnyboys to rename their band to one of their more marketable food product lines.

== History ==
The Berri Co-operative Packing Union started in the town of Berri, in the Riverland region of South Australia in 1943. In 1961 a separate company, Berri Fruit Juices Co-operative Ltd was established. The Sunny-boy trademark (with its original hyphen) was first registered by Berri Limited in 1964.

== Flavours ==
There were three flavours originally: orange (Sunny-boy), raspberry (Razz), and cola (Glug).

They were relaunched in the 1990s and all were called Sunnyboys with flavours like Orange Explosion (or original 'Sunnyboy'), Razz Raspberry, Zap Lime, Pow Pine Lime, Glug Cola, and Lemonade Blast.

In October 1996, Buzz Blackcurrant flavour was introduced.

Other flavours that people recall:

- ? - Passionfruit
- Pancho - Punch (Mexican theme)
- Hawaiian Punch
- Red Rock - Strawberry
- Whiz - Lime
- Sammy Cool - Lime
- Big Daddy - Pineapple
- Pow - Pineapple

== Packaging ==
The vigorous nature of the packaging design meant that eating the ice block could take an entire school lunchbreak, and was difficult on the teeth. Charlotte Willis noted that the Tetra packaging had to be cut at just the right angle in order to be opened, and that the shape meant they were easily dropped. The equilateral triangle pack was changed to an isosceles shape in 1987.

An instant-win competition meant that every "one in five" ice blocks had a giveaway offer, with the prize of a subsequent free Sunnyboy, commonly referred to as “a free”, or 'lucky'.

== Availability ==
In 1991, the recipe and Sunnyboy brand were bought by National Foods. Since this time, availability of Sunnyboy ice blocks decreased, but they were still available in three flavours; orange, raspberry and cola. In 1998, Sunnyboys were featured in Agro's drink and freezies showbag, and the Sunnyboy showbag, at the Sydney Royal Easter Show. The Sunnyboy showbag was also offered in 1999, It was also listed in The Sunday Mail's Showbag Guide 2004. Rob Hunter noted that the ice block was intermittently available, but showbags were an occasional source.

== Related Sunnyboy products ==
In September 1996, Sunnyboy Jelly was launched as "Australia's first chill and eat jelly", for school-age children. It could be eaten straight from the shelf, or chilled in the refrigerator. The jelly was available in Glug Cola, Ozzie Orange, Razz Raspberry and Zap Lime flavours. At the time of the jelly's introduction, it was demarcated from the ice block variety, with the original Sunnyboy clarified in marketing as the frozen novelty, "Sunnyboy Ice".

In 2006, Sunnyboy branded cordial as released which included eight flavours; lemon, apple berry, mango mandarin, pinelime, strawberry watermelon, fruit cup, raspberry and orange.

In 2010, Smooze brand natural fruit ices were noted in marketing as being similar to a smaller-scale Sunnyboy, but with the difference of natural ingredients.

== News coverage ==
In 2012, they were included in a shopping list in a satirical article about dishes for Australia Day. The article was by Wimmera Mail Times' chief sub-editor, Keith Lockwood, in response to a major newspaper's feature of multicultural Australia Day fare.

In 2014, actor William McInnes highlighted Sunnyboys as a source of communal sentimentality. That same year, Richard Glover included "The Sunnyboy" in a list of "unsung superfood heroes of the 70s".

In January 2016, Kylie Northover noted that Sunnyboys were no longer available at municipal baths in Melbourne.

== Discontinuation ==
In October 1996, National Food Beverages Group's general manager marketing and sales, John O'Hara, launched new products (including Sunnyboy Jelly) to promote the Sunnyboy brand. This attempted to reinvigorate the declining water ice market, a decline which he attributed to minimal product innovation, rather than a reduction of consumer interest.

In January 2012, the ice blocks were linked to the Kirin-owned food and beverage firm, Lion.

In late September 2016, manufacturer The Daily Juice Co. announced they were no longer manufacturing the product due to a reduction in consumer demand over several years. A petition to continue creation of the ice block was posted on change.org, however it did not reach the required number of signatures.

Entrepreneurship publication Smart Company featured Sunnyboys as a case which showed that customers complaining online about discontinued products are often not the core buyers. This is because their personal attachment often has a nostalgic focus, rather than current support.
