= Love in a Box =

- 7-inch vinyl single

Single by Sunnyboys

from the album Get Some Fun
- B-side: "Physical Jerk"
- Released: March 1984
- Recorded: 1983; Ridgefarm Studios, London, England
- Genre: Soft rock, pop rock
- Length: 3:21
- Label: Mushroom
- Songwriter(s): Jeremy Oxley
- Producer(s): Nick Garvey

Sunnyboys singles chronology
"Show Me Some Discipline" (1983)	"Love in a Box" (1984)	"Comes as No Surprise" (1984)

"Love in a Box" is a song recorded by Australian band Sunnyboys. It written by lead singer-guitarist, Jeremy Oxley and was released in March 1984 as the second single of the band's third studio album, Get Some Fun. "Love in a Box" peaked at No. 46 on the Kent Music Report singles chart.

== Track listing ==
7" vinyl

- Side A "Love in a Box" - 3:21
- Side B "Physical Jerk" - 2:51

== Charts ==
Chart (1984)	Peak position
Australia Kent Music Report Singles Chart	46

== Release history ==
Region	Date	Label	Format	Catalogue
Australia	March 1984	Mushroom	7" vinyl	K-9363
