= Mushroom 25 Live =

Live album by Various artists
- Released: December 1998
- Recorded: 14 November 1998
- Genre: Pop / dance / rock
- Length: 360 min 1998 VHS; 340 min 2002 DVD
- Label: Mushroom Records

Various artists chronology
Mushroom Evolution Concert (1982)	Mushroom 25 Live (1998)

Mushroom 25 Live is a live album, video and DVD by various Australian musicians and was recorded at the Mushroom 25 Concert held on Saturday 14 November 1998, at the Melbourne Cricket Ground. From the early afternoon until late at night for the nine-hour concert, 56 acts, including many of the biggest names in Australian music, performed their hits to celebrate the 25th anniversary of Mushroom Records, which was organised by its owner, Michael Gudinski. The concert featured former Cold Chisel singer Jimmy Barnes guesting with INXS on "The Loved One" and "Good Times" in tribute of Michael Hutchence for their first public performance since his death in November 1997.

The 1998 VHS comprised 3 video cassettes with a total time of 360 min. By 2002, Gudinski's Liberation Blue Records re-released the concert both on audio as a 2xCD and video as a 2xDVD set. The 2xCD set has 15 tracks each with Disc 1 length of 71: 45, and Disc 2 length of 75:35. The DVD is a double disc set in Dolby Digital 5.1 audio, with a running time of almost six hours and featuring deluxe Digipak packaging. Audio - Dolby Digital 5.1 Regions - 1,2,3,4,5,6. Disc Format - 2 x DVD9. Disc One: 174 Minutes. Disc Two: 166 Minutes. Rated 'E'

== Background ==
Impresario Michael Gudinski and fellow music agent Ray Evans formed Mushroom Records in late 1972. Their first album was an ambitious triple-LP live recording of the 1973 Sunbury Pop Festival. In its first few years Mushroom released albums and singles by some of the most significant Australian rock acts of the period, including Madder Lake, Chain, The Dingoes and Skyhooks. Success with Skyhooks' first few albums followed by Split Enz, Models, INXS, Kylie Minogue and Jimmy Barnes enabled Mushroom to dominate the Australian music industry into the 1990s. In 1982, Mushroom Records celebrated its tenth anniversary by running the Mushroom Evolution Concert which was released as a triple live album and a related VHS. Gudinski sold 49% of his interests in Mushroom Records to rival Festival Records then owned by Rupert Murdoch's News Corporation in 1993 for a reputed $22 million. Gudinski decided to celebrate Mushroom Records' 25th Anniversary with a concert held at the Melbourne Cricket Ground on 14 November 1998. The concert featured former Cold Chisel singer Jimmy Barnes guesting with INXS on "The Loved One" and "Good Times" in tribute of Michael Hutchence for their first public performance since his death. Kylie Minogue emerged from a birthday cake and performed a medley of songs. A month later the album, Mushroom 25 Live was released on CD. Less than a year later, Gudinski sold the remaining 51% to News Corporation's James Murdoch for a reputed $40 million, and it was merged with Festival Records to form Festival Mushroom Records. By 2002, Gudinski's Liberation Blue Records re-released the concert both on audio as a 2xCD and video as a 2xDVD set.

== CD track listing ==
1998 single CD version

1. "Leaps and Bounds" – Paul Kelly
2. "It's a Man's Man's World" – Renée Geyer
3. "Love Comes Easy" – Vika and Linda
4. "This Is It" – Dannii Minogue
5. "Medley: "Celebration"/"What Do I Have to Do?"/"Step Back in Time"/"Wouldn't Change a Thing"/"Turn It Into Love"/"Confide in Me"/"Shocked"/"Never Too Late"/"Did It Again"/"Hand on Your Heart"/"Better the Devil You Know"/"Celebration" – Kylie Minogue
6. "Mysterious Girl" – Peter André
7. "It's Alright" – Deni Hines
8. "Even When I'm Sleeping" – Leonardo's Bride
9. "Tucker's Daughter" – Ian Moss
10. "No Aphrodisiac" – The Whitlams
11. "Dogs Are Talking" – The Angels
12. "Most People I Know Think that I'm Crazy" – Billy Thorpe
13. "Lover Lover" – Jimmy Barnes
14. "Good Times" – Jimmy Barnes and INXS

== VHS Track listing ==
1. "Delicious" – Moler
2. "Pressure Sway" – Machinations
3. "Change in Mood" – Scott Carne
4. "Die Yuppie Die" – Painters and Dockers
5. "Divi Van" – Painters and Dockers
6. "Time Bomb" – Nick Barker
7. "Stuck On You" – Paul Norton
8. "Play the Game" – Wendy Stapleton
9. "Mighty Rock" – Stars
10. "Soul Kind of Feeling" – Dynamic Hepnotics featuring Robert Susz
11. "Green Limousine" – The Badloves
12. "Black and Blue" – Chain
13. "I Remember When I Was Young" – Chain
14. "Where Are You Now?" – Juno Roxas
15. "Suburban Boy" – Dave Warner
16. "Don't Fall in Love" – The Ferrets featuring Billy Miller
17. "A Tale They Won't Believe" – Weddings Parties Anything
18. "Father's Day" – Weddings Parties Anything
19. "Hard Land" – Chris Wilson
20. "I Can't Stand the Rain" – Wilson Diesel
21. "Love Comes Easy" – Vika and Linda
22. "Goodbye Lollipop" – Madder Lake
23. "12lb Toothbrush" – Madder Lake
24. "Wanna Be Up" – Chantoozies
25. "Out Of Mind Out Of Sight" – James Freud
26. "Apple Eyes" – Swoop
27. "Goosebumps" – Christie Allen
28. "(Everybody Wants To) Work" – Uncanny X-Men
29. "This Is It" – Dannii
30. "All I Wanna Do" – Dannii
31. "Cry" – The Mavis's
32. "Naughty Boy" – The Mavis's
33. "It's Only the Beginning" – Deborah Conway
34. "Madame Butterfly Is in Trouble" – Deborah Conway
35. "Took the Children Away" – Archie Roach with Ruby Hunter
36. "Last Ditch Cabaret" – Mark Seymour
37. "Holy Grail" – Mark Seymour
38. "Ghost Ships" – Chris Bailey
39. "Just Like Fire Would" – Chris Bailey
40. "Wide Open Road" – Chris Bailey and Paul Kelly
41. "Heading in the Right Direction" – Renée Geyer
42. "It's a Man's Man's World" – Renée Geyer
43. "Strangers on a Train" – The Sports
44. "Who Listens to the Radio" – The Sports
45. "Stand-up" – Mick Molloy
46. "Happy Man" – Sunnyboys
47. "Alone With You" – Sunnyboys
48. "Medley" – Kylie Minogue
49. "Looking for an Echo" – Ol'55
50. "On the Prowl" – Ol'55
51. "Leaps and Bounds" – Paul Kelly
52. "To Her Door" – Paul Kelly
53. "Throw Your Arms Around Me" – Mark Seymour/Kate Ceberano
54. "Most People I Know Think That I'm Crazy" – Billy Thorpe and The Aztecs
55. "Ooh Poo Pah Doo" – Billy Thorpe and the Aztecs
56. "Run to Paradise" – Choirboys
57. "Tucker's Daughter" – Ian Moss
58. "Pash" – Kate Ceberano
59. "Mysterious Girl" – Peter Andre
60. "It's Alright" – Deni Hines
61. "Even When I'm Sleeping" – Leonardo's Bride
62. "No Aphrodisiac" – The Whitlams
63. "We Gotta Get Out of This Place" – The Angels
64. "Dogs Are Talking" – The Angels
65. "Driving Wheels" – Jimmy Barnes
66. "Lay Down Your Guns" – Jimmy Barnes
67. "Lover Lover" – Jimmy Barnes
68. "Working Class Man" – Jimmy Barnes
69. "The Loved One" – Jimmy Barnes with INXS The Loved One
70. "Good Times" – Jimmy Barnes with INXS

=== 2002 Liberation Blue re-release ===
Disk 1

1. "I Remember When I Was Young" – Chain
2. "12lb Toothbrush" – Madder Lake
3. "Don't Fall in Love" – The Ferrets featuring Billy Miller
4. "Mighty Rock" – Stars
5. "Alone With You" – Sunnyboys
6. "Ghost Ships" – Chris Bailey
7. "On the Prowl" – Ol'55
8. "Out of Mind Out of Sight" – Models
9. "It's a Man's Man's World" – Reneé Geyer
10. "Pressure Sway" – Machinations
11. "Soul Kind of Feeling" – Dynamic Hepnotics
12. "Stranger on a Train" – Sports
13. "Most People I Know Think that I'm Crazy" – Billy Thorpe
14. "Tucker's Daughter" – Ian Moss
15. "Run to Paradise" – Choirboys

Disk 2

1. "Leaps and Bounds" – Paul Kelly
2. "Even When I'm Sleeping" – Leonardo's Bride
3. "Father's Day" – Things of Stone and Wood
4. "Green Limousine" – Badloves
5. "No Aphrodisiac" – Whitlams
6. "Last Ditch Cabaret" – Mark Seymour
7. "Love Comes Easy" – Vika and Linda
8. "Madame Butterfly Is in Trouble" – Deborah Conway
9. "It's Alright" – Deni Hines
10. "Mysterious Girl" – Peter Andre
11. "This Is It" – Dannii Minogue
12. "Medley" – Kylie Minogue
13. "Dogs Are Talking" – Angels
14. "Lover Lover" – Jimmy Barnes
15. "Good Times" – Jimmy Barnes & INXS

== DVD Track listing ==
=== Disc one ===
1. "Delicious" – Moler
2. "Pressure Sway" – Machinations
3. "No Say in It" – Machinations
4. "Change in Mood" – Scott Carne
5. "Die Yuppie Die" – Painters and Dockers
6. "Divi Van" – Painters and Dockers
7. "Time Bomb" – Nick Barker
8. "Stuck on You" – Paul Norton
9. "Play the Game" – Wendy Stapleton
10. "Mighty Rock" – Stars
11. "Soul Kind of Feeling" – Dynamic Hepnotics featuring Robert Susz
12. "Green Limousine" – The Badloves
13. "Black and Blue" – Chain
14. "I Remember When I Was Young" – Chain
15. "Where Are You Now?" – Juno Roxas
16. "Suburban Boy" – Dave Warner
17. "Don't Fall in Love" – The Ferrets featuring Billy Miller
18. "A Tale They Won't Believe" – Weddings Parties Anything
19. "Father's Day" – Weddings Parties Anything
20. "AcDc" – Chris Wilson
21. "I Can't Stand the Rain" – Wilson Diesel
22. "Love Comes Easy" – Vika and Linda
23. "Goodbye Lollipop" – Madder Lake
24. "12lb Toothbrush" – Madder Lake
25. "Wanna Be Up" – Chantoozies
26. "Out of Mind Out of Sight" – James Freud
27. "Apple Eyes" – Swoop
28. "Goosebumps" – Christie Allen
29. "(Everybody Wants To) Work" – Uncanny X-Men
30. "This Is It" – Dannii Minogue
31. "All I Wanna Do" – Dannii Minogue
32. "Cry" – The Mavis's
33. "Naughty Boy" – The Mavis's
34. "It's Only the Beginning" – Deborah Conway
35. "Madame Butterfly Is in Trouble" – Deborah Conway
36. "Took the Children Away" – Archie Roach with Ruby Hunter
37. "Last Ditch Cabaret" – Mark Seymour
38. "Holy Grail" – Mark Seymour

=== Disc two ===
1. "Ghost Ships" – Chris Bailey
2. "Just Like Fire Would" – Chris Bailey
3. "Wide Open Road" – Chris Bailey with Paul Kelly
4. "Heading in the Right Direction" – Renée Geyer
5. "It's a Man's Man's World" – Renée Geyer
6. "Strangers on a Train" – The Sports
7. "Who Listens to the Radio?" – The Sports
8. "Stand Up" – Mick Molloy
9. "Happy Man" – The Sunnyboys
10. "Alone With You" – The Sunnyboys
11. "Medley: "Celebration"/"What Do I Have to Do?"/"Step Back in Time"/"Wouldn't Change a Thing"/"Turn It Into Love"/"Confide in Me"/"Shocked"/"Never Too Late"/"Did It Again"/"Hand on Your Heart"/"Better the Devil You Know"/"Celebration" – Kylie Minogue
12. "Looking For An Echo" – Ol' 55
13. "On The Prowl" – Ol' 55
14. "Leaps and Bounds" – Paul Kelly
15. "To Her Door" – Paul Kelly
16. "Throw Your Arms Around Me" – Mark Seymour and Kate Ceberano
17. "Most People I Know Think That I'm Crazy" – Billy Thorpe
18. "Ooh Poo Pah Doo" – Billy Thorpe
19. "Run To Paradise" – The Choirboys
20. "Tucker's Daughter" – Ian Moss
21. "Pash" – Kate Ceberano
22. "Mysterious Girl" – Peter André
23. "It's Alright" – Deni Hines
24. "Even When I'm Sleeping" – Leonardo's Bride
25. "No Aphrodisiac" – The Whitlams
26. "We Gotta Get Out of This Place" – The Angels
27. "Dogs Are Talking" – The Angels
28. "Driving Wheels" – Jimmy Barnes
29. "Lay Down Your Guns" – Jimmy Barnes
30. "Lover Lover" – Jimmy Barnes
31. "Working Class Man" – Jimmy Barnes
32. "The Loved One" – Jimmy Barnes with INXS
33. "Good Times" – Jimmy Barnes with INXS
34. "Good Times" – (Reprise) Ensemble
