= Alone with You (Sunnyboys song) =

- 7-inch vinyl single

Single by Sunnyboys

from the album Sunnyboys
- B-side: "Stop and Think", "To the Bone"
- Released: October 1981
- Recorded: 1981; Alberts Studios, Sydney, Australia
- Length: 3:59
- Label: Mushroom
- Songwriter: Jeremy Oxley
- Producer: Lobby Loyde

Sunnyboys singles chronology
"Happy Man" (1981)	"Alone with You" (1981)	"You Need a Friend" (1982)

"Alone with You" is a song by Australian band Sunnyboys. It was written by lead singer-guitarist, Jeremy Oxley, and was the second single released in October 1981, on Mushroom Records, from their self-titled debut album, which had appeared in the previous month. The single was produced by Lobby Loyde and engineered by Colin Freeman at Alberts Studios, Sydney. "Alone with You" reached No. 28 on the Kent Music Report singles chart.

In January 2018, as part of Triple M's "Ozzest 100", the 'most Australian' songs of all time, "Alone with You" was ranked number 48.

== History ==
In October 1980, Sunnyboys recorded four tracks produced by Lobby Loyde: "Love to Rule", "The Seeker", "What You Need" and "Alone with You". They appeared on the band's self-titled and independently released 7" EP via Phantom Records in December that year. The initial pressing of 1,000 copies sold out in two weeks; it was later remixed and reissued as a 12" EP.

After signing with Mushroom Records "Alone with You" was re-recorded and issued as their second single in October 1981, which reached No. 28 on the Kent Music Report singles chart. It was included on their eponymous debut album, which had been released that September.

In the liner notes of the compilation album, Sunnyboys, Our Best of (December 2013), Jeremy Oxley wrote "'Alone With You' was picked as the second single off the album although I always thought it was the song with the most potential to be a hit. It was written at Longdown Street in between going to Art School and rehearsals... It was partly about a chick I knew and partly a generalisation about the pent up feelings of teenage lust and love."

The song was one of two the band performed during a November 1998 reunion for the Mushroom 25 Live concert to celebrate the label's 25th anniversary. Mushroom re-released the single in 1998 following the concert as part of their limited edition Classic Mushroom Singles series.

== Critical reception ==
Garry Raffaele of The Canberra Times reviewed Sunnyboys and felt that "'Happy Man', the single, is still, in my view, their best. Closely followed by 'Alone with You'."

Craig Mathieson in 100 Best Australian Albums describes it as their "signature song" and states that it "captures the excitement and trepidation of a first date, but the naive charm of the moment is undercut by the darkness of lyrics... The result is a great pop song that is equal parts tension (in the verse lyrics) and release (the catchy chorus, the great harmony vocals and blistering outro guitar solo)."

== Cover versions ==
In June 1999, Jimmy Little, recorded a cover version of "Alone with You" for his album, Messenger. For the 2000 feature film, Sample People's soundtrack The Superjesus delivered a "vibrant recording" according to Brad Green of Urban Cinefile; he continued that it "might have been great, but fails because it's clearly been mixed by the guitarist's mother." Dragon and Jenny Morris provided an acoustic rendition for the various artists' compilation, The best of acoustic. Volume one, in 2006.

On 6 March 2006 Off the Hip Records released Happy Man: Tribute to the Sunnyboys, with 18 cover versions of the group's tracks by various artists, including "Alone with You" by Brisbane-based group Shifter. In March 2015 Adalita performed a duet with Jack Davies as their version of "Alone with You" for Neighbours: 30 Years, album by various artists.

== Track listing ==
All tracks are written by Jeremy Oxley, unless otherwise shown

7" vinyl version
No.	Title	Length
1.	"Alone with You"	3:59
2.	"Stop and Think"	2:18
3.	"To the Bone"	2:14
Total length:		8:31

== Charts ==
Chart (1981)	Peak position
Australia Kent Music Report Singles Chart	28

== Release history ==
Region	Date	Label	Format	Catalogue
Australia	October 1981	Mushroom	7" vinyl	K-8476
Australia	November 1998	Mushroom	CD single	MUSH01823-2

== Credits ==
Sunnyboys

- Bil Bilson – drums
- Richard Burgman – guitar
- Jeremy Oxley – guitar, vocals
- Peter Oxley – bass guitar

Production

- Col Freeman – engineer
- Lobby Loyde – producer
