= Show Me Some Discipline =

- 7-inch vinyl single

Single by Sunnyboys

from the album Get Some Fun
- A-side: "Show Me Some Discipline"
- B-side: "Guts of Iron"
- Released: June 1983
- Recorded: 1983; Studios 301, Albert Studios, Sydney, Australia
- Genre: Alternative rock
- Length: 3:10
- Label: Mushroom
- Songwriter(s): Jeremy Oxley
- Producer(s): Chris Gilbey

Sunnyboys singles chronology
"This Is Real" (1982)	"Show Me Some Discipline" (1983)	"Love in a Box" (1984)

"Show Me Some Discipline" is a song recorded by Australian band Sunnyboys. It written by lead singer-guitarist, Jeremy Oxley and was released in June 1983 as the lead single of the band's third studio album, Get Some Fun. "Show Me Some Discipline" peaked at No. 44 on the Kent Music Report singles chart.

== Track listing ==
7" vinyl

- Side A "Show Me Some Discipline" - 3:10
- Side B "Guts of Iron" - 3:50

== Charts ==
Chart (1983)	Peak position
Australia Kent Music Report Singles Chart	44

== Release history ==
Region	Date	Label	Format	Catalogue
Australia	June 1983	Mushroom	7" vinyl	K-9142
