= Peter Oxley =

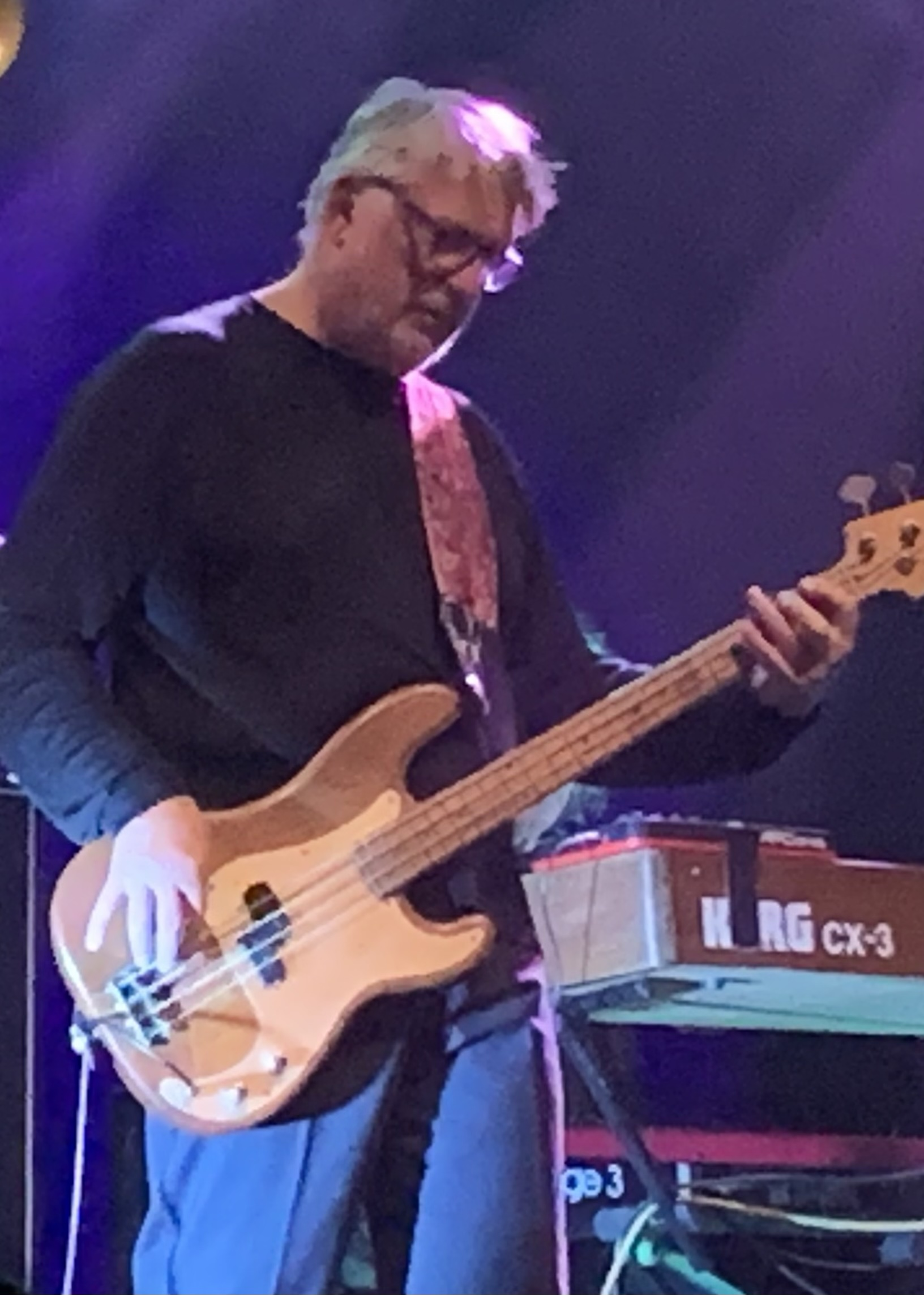
- Oxley in 2024

Background information
- Born: Australia
- Occupations: Musician, songwriter
- Instrument: Bass guitar
- Years active: 1975–1998
- Labels: Mushroom, Closer, Phantom, Shock, Mighty Boy
- Website: Sunnyboys Official website

Peter Oxley is the bass player for 1980s Australian pop-rock band The Sunnyboys.

He is credited with writing songs with The Sunnyboys: "The Stooge" (from the 1984 album Get Some Fun) and "You Don't Need Me" (from the 1983 album Individuals) and "Gone" from their self titled 1981 debut album. He also co-wrote "Let You Go", from the same record with his brother Jeremy.

The older brother of Sunnyboys front man Jeremy Oxley, Peter later formed a band with their sister Melanie Oxley, The Sparklers. Peter lived for many years in Newtown, Sydney, where he opened a woodfired Pizzeria which he ran for 16 years.

Peter began playing with Ed Kuepper in 2005.

In 2017, Peter joined Ed Kuepper's revival of The Aints! for a series of shows playing material from Kuepper's earlier band, The Saints. Following the tour, the band recorded an album of songs originally written around the time of The Saints, and followed this with another tour in late 2018. The Saints reformed and toured Australia in November 2024 with Peter Oxley on bass. The tour was a major success with all venues sold out.

Peter lives in the Inner West of Sydney with his partner and 2 children.

== Discography ==
=== Albums with (The Sunnyboys : 1980–84, 92 & 98) ===
- The Sunnyboys' - Mushroom (1981)
- Individuals - Mushroom (May 1982)
- Get Some Fun - Mushroom (1984)
- Real Live Sunnyboys - Mushroom (1984)
- Days Are Gone - Closer (1984)
- Plays The Best - Mushroom Records (July 1991)
- Shakin: Live August 1991 - Phantom Records (1992)
- This Is Real: Singles/Live/Rare - Feel Presents/Shock Records (20 September 2004)

=== Albums with (The Sparklers : 1985-1989) ===
- Persuasion - Mighty Boy (October 1988)

=== Albums with (The Aints! : 2017-2018) ===
- The Church of Simultaneous Existence - ABC Music (2018)
