= Jeremy Oxley =

Australian musician

- Born: 15 November 1961 (age 63); Kingscliff, New South Wales, Australia
- Genres: Alternative rock, power pop
- Occupation(s): Musician, songwriter
- Instrument(s): Guitar, vocals
- Years active: 1975–present
- Labels: Mushroom Records, Closer Records (France), Big Time, Waterfront, RCA Records, Shock Records, Yellow
- Website: Sunnyboys Official website

Jeremy Saxon Oxley (born 15 November 1961) is an Australian songwriter, singer and guitarist. He is best known for his work with the 1980s pop-rock band Sunnyboys.

== Biography ==
=== 1961–1978: early life ===
Jeremy Oxley grew up in the northern New South Wales town of Kingscliff after his parents, Eric and Jan, moved from Sydney. Jeremy was the second oldest of five children, the others being older brother Peter, sister Melanie and younger brothers Tim and Damien. Jeremy was a natural surfer, and at the age of 14 was Queensland's schoolboy surfing champion, he was also a talented soccer player and a gifted musician. Jeremy played the guitar and formed a high-school rock band with his older brother, Peter, and a primary school friend, Bill Bilson, called Wooden Horse.

=== 1979–1991: Sunnyboys, Chinless Elite and The Fishermen ===
In 1979 Jeremy's brother Peter, met Bil Bilson and Richard Burgman in Sydney and formed a band, Shy Imposters, which broke up in early 1980. Jeremy joined and they formed a new band, Sunnyboys. The band's name came from a Sunnyboy, an orange-flavoured water ice in a tetrahedron shaped 'tetra-pack'. According to Richard Burgman, the band chose the name because it represented ‘bright, happy, young, fun’. The band's first public performance was on 15 August 1980, supporting The Lipstick Killers and Me 262, and it quickly became popular in the Sydney band scene.

The band were signed to Mushroom Records and between 1981 and 1984, released three top 40 studio albums. The band dissolved in 1984 following internal dissent, industry disappointments and Jeremy's health issues. It was later revealed that Oxley has schizophrenia.

Jeremy went on to form Chinless Elite with Luke Bendt (drums), Mark Fuccilli (saxophone) (Big 5, Allniters), Sean McElvogue (trumpet, saxophone) (Big 5), Marcus Phelan (Allniters, Hoi Polloi), John Schofield (bass)(Paul Kelly and the Coloured Girls), Andrew Robertson (drums). The band exploring cover songs of soul legends; like Jimi Hendrix, Marvin Gaye, Otis Redding and Jimmy Cox/Eric Clapton. The Chinless Elite released a self-titled 12" EP and a 7" single, "I Got To Get to California"/"I Heard it on the Grapevine", on the Big Time label in 1985.

Oxley then formed The Fishermen in 1986, with Andrew Denison (vocals bass), Tony Gibson (guitar), Ian Patterson (drums), Melvin Stewart (vocals, bass). The band produced a 7" single, "Can't You Stop"/"City Opera" in November 1986 on the Waterfront Records label. recorded with Andrew Denison & Ian Potterton.

In 1987 Oxley attempted to revive the Sunnyboys name with a new line-up, as older brother Peter, Bilson and Burgman were all playing in other bands. The new line-up of Sunnyboys released a studio album Wildcat and three singles. The band retired early due to an accident damaging Oxley's hand. Recovering in early 1990s, Oxley re-formed the original Sunnyboys line-up for a re-union in 1991 and subsequent reformation tour and released a greatest hits album, Play the Best in July 1991.

=== 1992–2007: solo ===
In 1992, Oxley released his debut EP A Little Bit of You in Me as Jeremy 'Ponytail' Oxley. Shortly thereafter, Oxley suffered a recurrence of a previous illness, which temporarily halted his work in music.

=== 1998–present: reformation of Sunnyboys ===
In November 1998 The Sunnyboys reformed for the Mushroom 25 Concert at the Melbourne Cricket Ground to celebrate the 25th anniversary of Mushroom Records, organised by Michael Gudinski.

Between 1998 and 2008, Oxley composed two unreleased albums, Sanctuary 9, and Monastery. In 2008, Jeremy found love and moved to Queensland. The couple have since married.

In April 2012, the Sunnyboys original line-up played as part of the Dig It Up concert series and have continued to tour periodically since. In 2019, Sunnyboys celebrated 40-year since the release of their self-titled debut extended play with a 40 album and tour.

== Discography ==
=== Extended plays ===
Year	Album details
1992	A Little Bit of You in Me: Credited to Jeremy 'Ponytail' Oxley; Released: 1992; Label: Yellow (YEL 0001); Format: CD
2013	Companion: Released: June 2013; Label: Jeremy * Marey Oxley (OXLEY001); Format: CD, DD

=== See also ===
- Sunnyboys
