= Live from South Channel Island =

Live album by Mildlife
- Released: 27 August 2021
- Recorded: 10 March 2021
- Venue: South Channel Island
- Length: 73:08
- Labels: Heavenly; PIAS
- Producer: Mildlife

Mildlife chronology
Automatic (2017)	Live from South Channel Island (2021)	Chorus (2024)

Live from South Channel Island is the first live album by Australian psychedelic jazz fusion group Mildlife. The album was recorded during their one-off livestream performance at South Channel Island on 10 March 2021. Framed by Port Phillip Bay, the band performed tracks from their albums Phase and Automatic.

500 ocean marbled vinyl copies were released on 27 August 2021, before the album's general release on 29 April 2022. The album peaked at number 29 on the ARIA Charts in May 2022.

At the 2022 ARIA Music Awards, the album won the ARIA Award for Best Jazz Album.

At the AIR Awards of 2023, the album was nominated for Best Independent Jazz Album or EP.

== Track listing ==
All tracks are written by Mildlife.

Side A
No.	Title	Length
1.	"Rare Air"	10:31
2.	"Vapour"	4:35

Side B
No.	Title	Length
1.	"Im Blau"	11:50
2.	"Citations"	8:50

Side C
No.	Title	Length
1.	"The Magnificent Moon"	10:42
2.	"Zwango Zop"	7:03

Side D
No.	Title	Length
1.	"Automatic"	8:24
2.	"Air"	12:03

== Charts ==
Chart performance for Live from South Channel Island
Chart (2022)	Peak position
Australian Albums (ARIA)	29
