= Rossitto =

Rossitto is an Italian surname. Notable people with the surname include:

- Angelo Rossitto (1908–1991), American actor and voice artist
- Fabio Rossitto (born 1971), Italian footballer and manager
- Steven Rossitto (born 1993 or 1994), Australian jazz singer

== See also ==
- Rossetto (disambiguation)
