= Don't Sleep =

Don't Sleep may refer to:

- Don't Sleep (album), by Alice Ivy, 2020
- Don't Sleep (film), 2017
- Don't Sleep, a 2000 album by DJ Hurricane
- Don't Sleep, a 2010 album by Stealing O'Neal
- Don't Sleep, a band formed by Dave Smalley in 2018
- "Don't Sleep", a 2016 song by Dorian
- "Don't Sleep", a 2021 song by 24kGoldn
- Don't Sleep, a 2012 television series on BET hosted by T. J. Holmes

== See also ==
- "Don't Sleep on Me", a 2017 song by Ty Dolla $ign featuring Future and 24hrs, from the album Beach House 3
- "Won't Sleep", a 2021 song by Tones and I
