= Ian Chaplin =

Australian musician

- Also known as: Ian Chaplin
- Born: 17 April 1963 (age 63); Adelaide, South Australia, Australia
- Genre: Jazz
- Occupations: Saxophonist, composer, producer, songwriter

Ian Chaplin is an Australian jazz saxophonist. Chaplin, Scott Tinkler, Phillip Rex and Scott Lambie won the 1998 ARIA Award for Best Jazz Album with their album The Future In Today. The Ian Chaplin Quartet was nominated for same award in 1997 with Tjapangati.

Chaplin has been a member of Paul Grabowsky's Sextet, the Australian Art Orchestra, Decoy, and was a band member on Tonight Live with Steve Vizard.

== Discography ==
=== Albums ===
List of albums, with selected details
Title	Details
Tjapangati (as Ian Chaplin Quartet)	Released: 1996; Format: CD; Label: Jazzhead
The Future In Today (as Chaplin, Tinkler, Rex, Lambie)	Released: 1998; Format: CD; Label: Jazzhead (MUSH33082.2)

== Awards and nominations ==
=== ARIA Music Awards ===
The ARIA Music Awards is an annual awards ceremony that recognises excellence, innovation, and achievement across all genres of Australian music. They commenced in 1987.

Year	Nominee / work	Award	Result	Ref.
1997	Tjapangati	Best Jazz Album	Nominated	
1998	The Future In Today (as Chaplin, Tinkler, Rex, Lambie)	Best Jazz Album	Won	
