= Jim McLeod's Jazz Tracks =

Compilation album
- Released: 1989
- Recorded: 1981–1988
- Genre: Jazz
- Label: ABC Records

Jim McLeod's Jazz Tracks is a compilation album of jazz music recorded for Jim McLeod's long running ABC-FM radio show Jazztrack. The lead track "Windows of Arquez" by Bryce Rohde And Bruce Cale was at the time the shows theme song.

== Reception ==
The album was nominated as the Best Jazz Album at the 1990 ARIA Awards but lost out to Browne, Costello & Grabowsky with their album Six By Three.

Adrian Jackson, writing in BRW, praised the album and signed off "hoping it turns out to be the first of a series."

== Track listing ==
1. "Windows of Arquez" - Bryce Rohde and Bruce Cale
2. "Grandpa Spells" - Bob Barnard's Jazz Quartet
3. "Moonglow" - Andrew Firth's Quartet
4. "When Lights Are Low" - The Swing Street Orchestra
5. "Tangerine" - Keith Hounslow's Quartet
6. "All Of Me" - Errol Buddle's Quartet
7. "Firm Roots" - The Dale Barlow Quartet
8. "Intersection" - Roger Frampton's Intersection
9. "Sergery" - The Bob Bertles Quartet
10. "Plain Talk" - Ten Part Invention
11. "Blue Mountains" - Bryce Rohde and Bruce Cale
12. "At play" - Ten Part Invention

The last two tracks only appear on the cd version of the album.
