= Bob Barnard =

Bob Barnard may refer to:

- Robert Barnard (1936–2013), English crime writer, critic and lecturer
- Bob Barnard (musician) (1933–2022), Australian trumpet and cornet player
