= Sam Keevers =

Australian jazz pianist

- Origin: Australia
- Genres: Jazz
- Occupation: Pianist

Sam Keevers is an Australian jazz pianist. Together with Jamie Oehlers he was nominated for ARIA Award for Best Jazz Album in 2005 for Grace.

Keevers has been a member of Vince Jones band, Los Cabrones (Latin Jazz big band) and Red Fish Blue.

== Discography ==
=== Albums ===
List of albums, with selected details
Title	Details
Little Hank	Released: 1995; Format: CD; Label: Newmarket Music (NEW 1084.2)
Grace (with Jamie Oehlers)	Released: 2004; Format: CD; Label: JazzHead (HEAD052)
No Conditions (as Sam Keevers Nonet)	Released: 2006; Format: CD; Label: JazzHead (HEAD067)
No Exceptions (as Sam Keevers Nonet)	Released: 2006; Format: CD; Label: JazzHead (HEAD068)
Song of Friends (with Joshua Kyle)	Released: 2014; Format: Digital; Label: Joshua Kyle

== Awards and nominations ==
=== ARIA Music Awards ===
The ARIA Music Awards is an annual awards ceremony held by the Australian Recording Industry Association. They commenced in 1987.

Year	Nominee / work	Award	Result	Ref.
2005	Grace (with Jamie Oehlers)	Best Jazz Album	Nominated	
