= David Beck (musician) =

Australian drummer

- Origin: Australia
- Genres: Jazz
- Occupation: Drummer

David Beck is an Australian drummer. Along with Jamie Oehlers and Paul Grabowsky he was nominated for ARIA Award for Best Jazz Album in 2008 with Lost And Found. He was a member of Australian jazz ensemble Frock from 1996-2016.

Beck was also the drummer for the group Birtles Shorrock Goble, which comprised the original singers and songwriters of Little River Band.

== Discography ==
=== Albums ===
Title	Details
Lost and Found (as Oehlers Grabowsky & Beck)	Released: 2007; Label: Jazzhead (HEAD091); Format: CD, DD

== Awards and nominations ==
=== AIR Awards ===
The Australian Independent Record Awards (commonly known informally as AIR Awards) is an annual awards night to recognise, promote and celebrate the success of Australia's Independent Music sector.

Year	Nominee / work	Award	Result
2008	Lost and Found	Best Independent Jazz Album	Nominated

=== ARIA Music Awards ===
The ARIA Music Awards is an annual awards ceremony held by the Australian Recording Industry Association.

Year	Nominee / work	Award	Result	Ref.
2008	Lost and Found with Oehlers & Grabowsky	Best Jazz Album	Nominated	
