= The Esso Australian Jazz Summit =

Live album by various artists
- Released: 1986
- Recorded: 22 February 1986, Bondi Beach, Sydney
- Genre: Jazz
- Label: ABC Records
- Producer: Barry Crook, Chris Boniface

The Esso Australian Jazz Summit is a live compilation album of jazz music recorded live at the Bondi Beach. The album was nominated for 1987 ARIA Award for Best Jazz Album.

== Background ==
The Esso Australian Jazz Summit was held on Saturday 22 February 1986 at Sydney's Bondi Beach. The Summit had 13 acts set to play but the show wash rained out after only 10 had performed. Don Burrows Quintet, Andrew Firth with the Don Burrows Quintet, Sandy Evans Trio, Southern Cross Jazz Quartet, Andy Sugg and Andy Vance Duo, Dave Dallwitz Sydney Big Band, Allan Browne Band, Mervyn Acheson and the Mainstreamers, Jazzmanian Quartet, Rick Price Quartet and NSW Conservatorium Big Band all performed. Nova Dreams, Schmoe and Co and the Bernie McGann Quartet were listed did not get to play.

The summit was recorded by the Australian Broadcasting Corporation and was broadcast on ABC TV as part of The Burrows Collections series. A double album was released later that year through ABC Records.

== Reception ==
The album was nominated as the Best Jazz Album at the inaugural ARIA Awards.

Writing in The Canberra Times, Michael Foster praised the album stating "The music is exuberant, the recording and engineering worthy of the musicians." The Sydney Morning Herald's Madeleine D'Haeye wrote "It's an excellent release, highlighted by the variety of styles – modern, traditional, through to avant garde – with solos, jams and bursts or improvisation, in moods ranging from the light-hearted to the serious."

== Track listing ==
Side 1

1. Toad – NSW Conservatorium Big Band conducted by Don Burrows
2. Sketch – NSW Conservatorium Big Band featuring Don Burrows on Saxophone
3. Gospel Dance – Rick Price Quartet
4. O'Pato – Rick Price Quartet

Side 2

1. Jersey Lightning – The Allan Browne Band
2. Wild Man Blues – The Allan Browne Band
3. Witchhunt – Southern Cross Jazz Quartet
4. Come On Mama – Sandy Evans Trio

Side 3

1. Straight No Chaser – Joe Lane with the Don Burrows Quintet with James Morrison on Trumpet
2. Where Would I Go Without You – Joy Mulligan with the Don Burrows Quintet
3. Now Is The Time – Andrew Firth with the Don Burrows Quintet with James Morrison on Trumpet
4. Chasing Your Tail – Andy Sugg And Andy Vance Duo

Side 4

1. If I Had You – Merv Acheson and the Mainstreamers
2. Under Those Chandeliers – Jazzmanian Quartet
3. Shanghai Shuffle – Dave Dallwitz Sydney Big Band
4. Milenburg Joys – Dave Dallwitz Sydney Big Band
5. Sugarfoot Stomp – Dave Dallwitz Sydney Big Band
