= The World According to James =

- Years active: 1992 -
- Members: James Greening; Andrew Robson; Steve Elphick; Toby Hall

The World According to James is an Australian jazz band founded by James Greening. Their album Wayback was nominated for the 2003 ARIA Award for Best Jazz Album.

== Members ==
- James Greening - trombone, pocket trumpet, tuba
- Andrew Robson - alto saxophone
- Steve Elphick - double bass
- Toby Hall - drums
- Lloyd Swanton - bass
- Tony Buck - Drums
- Carl Orr - guitar

== Discography ==
=== Albums ===
Title	Details
No Job Too Small	Released: 1999; Label: Rufus; Format: CD
Wayback	Released: 2002; Label: Heads Up; Format: CD
Lingua Franca	Released: 2009; Label: Lamplight; Format: CD

== Awards and nominations ==
=== AIR Awards ===
The Australian Independent Record Awards (commonly known informally as AIR Awards) is an annual awards night to recognise, promote and celebrate the success of Australia's Independent Music sector.

Year	Nominee / work	Award	Result
2009	Lingua Franca	Best Independent Jazz Album	Won

=== ARIA Music Awards ===
The ARIA Music Awards is an annual awards ceremony that recognises excellence, innovation, and achievement across all genres of Australian music.

Year	Nominee / work	Award	Result	Ref.
2003	Wayback	Best Jazz Album	Nominated	
