= Sametz =

Sametz is a surname. Notable people with the surname include:

- Michael Sametz (born 1996), Canadian road cyclist
- Phillip Sametz (fl. 1980s–2010s), Australian radio broadcaster
- Steven Sametz (born 1954), American conductor and composer
