= Jacki Cooper =

Australian jazz singer

- Birth name: Jacqueline Anne Cooper
- Born: Slough, Berkshire, England
- Origin: Adelaide, South Australia, Australia
- Genres: Jazz
- Occupation(s): Singer-songwriter, teacher
- Instrument: Vocals
- Years active: 1990–present
- Labels: Independent
- Website: morrisonmusic.com.au

Jacqueline Anne Cooper (born 2 December in Slough, England) is an Australian jazz singer, known for her full and harmonious vocals. She has released five independent studio albums and one live album. Cooper won Best Jazz Vocal in the 2010 Musicoz Awards. Cooper travels Australia with her husband, drummer and big band leader John Morrison, teaching workshops at schools and music camps, and appearing at festivals and jazz clubs. Her song "Don't Die Wond'rin'" was a finalist at the UK Songwriting Contest, Jazz/Blues section, in 2013.

== Biography ==
Jacqueline Anne "Jacki" Cooper was born in Slough, Berkshire. She moved to Adelaide in 1989 and attended Dover Gardens TAFE College. After receiving her Certificate of Commercial Music (Performance), she completed a Bachelor of Music in jazz performance at the University of Adelaide in 1993. On the advice of a tutor, Schmoe Elhay, she travelled to San Francisco to study at the Stanford Jazz Workshop at Stanford University, California. While studying, Cooper met jazz composer David Dallwitz and joined his Dixieland band. Dallwitz was an influential mentor, teaching her much about early jazz.

In 2000 Cooper formed the Jacki Cooper Jazz Quartet and released her first album, Jacki Cooper and Friends, she performed regularly on the Adelaide jazz club circuit. She followed up with Love for Sale in 2002 and was a finalist in the 2006 MusicOz Awards.

In July 2006 Cooper moved to Sydney and worked with drummer and big band leader John Morrison. She joined his big band, Swing City. In 2007 Cooper and Morrison formed New Generation, a vehicle for promoting up and coming young talent, which featured Tim Fisher on piano, Karl Dunnicliff on bass guitar and Bernard Winetraub on vibraphone. The quintet performed at Thredbo Jazz Festival and a live recording was released in 2007.

A studio album, Mood Swings, followed in 2009, which included an original track, "Play Me". This track earned Cooper the 2010 Musicoz Award for Best Jazz Vocal.

In late 2012 Morrison and Cooper teamed up with Australian jazz guitarist George Golla to record The Journey. Alan Western of Brisbane Jazz Club felt her "vocal talents are showcased to the full, especially with standout performances of 'Walk on the Wild Side', 'Solitude' and her own composition 'Don't Die Wond'rin'." Also on the album was American alto saxophonist Jeff Clayton of the Clayton Hamilton Jazz Orchestra, who was visiting Australia to perform and record with John's brother, world-renowned multi-instrumentalist James Morrison. In May 2015, Cooper released a duo album with Golla, Tea for Two.

Jacki and John are regulars at Australian jazz festivals, often appearing at Wangaratta Jazz Festival, Darling Harbour International Jazz Festival, Thredbo Jazz Festival, Noosa Jazz Festival, Moruya Jazz Festival, Dubbo Jazz Festival, Dingo Creek Jazz and Blues Festival, Stonnington Jazz Festival. In 2013 they launched their own festival in Port Macquarie - Big Band Blast, a non-competitive festival for big bands of all ages, styles and abilities. Her song "Don't Die Wond'rin'" was a finalist at the UK Songwriting Contest in the Jazz/Blues section in 2013.

== Discography ==
- Jacki Cooper and Friends (2000)
- Love for Sale (26 August 2006)
- Live in Concert (by John Morrison and Jacki Cooper with New Generation) (live album, 2007)
- Mood Swings (by John Morrison and Jacki Cooper) (2009)
- The Journey (by Jacki Cooper and John Morrison featuring George Golla) (2012)
- Tea for Two (by Jacki Cooper and George Golla) (May 2015)
