= AIR Awards of 2008 =

3rd edition of annual Australian music award

- Date: 24 November 2008
- Venue: The Corner Hotel, Melbourne, Australia
- Hosted by: Jane Gazzo and Jake Stone

Highlights
- Most wins: Geoffrey Gurrumul Yunupingu (3)
- Website: https://air.org.au/air-awards/

The AIR Awards of 2008 is the third annual Australian Independent Record Labels Association Music Awards (generally known as the AIR Awards) and was an award ceremony at The Corner Hotel, in Melbourne, Australia on 24 November 2008 to recognise outstanding achievements of local artists who release their work through an Australian-owned independent record label and distribute their work through a locally owned distribution firm. The event was again sponsored by German liquor brand, Jägermeister.

The event was hosted by Jane Gazzo and Jake Stone from independent band, Bluejuice and Australian pay-TV music broadcaster Channel V aired the ceremony on 16 December 2008.

The categories for Best Hard Rock/Punk Album and Hip Hop Album were added to list of awards.

== Performers ==
- Eddy Current Suppression Ring
- Felicity Urquhart
- Grafton Primary
- Lior
- The Drones with Martha Wainwright
- The Getaway Plan
- The Herd

== Nominees and winners ==
=== AIR Awards ===
Winners are listed first and highlighted in boldface; other final nominees are listed alphabetically.

Best Independent Artist	Best Independent Release
**The Herd**; Birds of Tokyo; Lior; Ricki-Lee Coulter; The Getaway Plan; The Waifs	**Geoffrey Gurrumul Yunupingu - Gurrumul** (Skinnyfish Music/MGM); British India - Thieves (Flashpoint Records/Shock); Lior - Corner of an Endless Road (Sensico Unico/MGM); Little Red – Listen to Little Red (Hooch Hound Records/Shock); Sneaky Sound System – 2 (Whack Records/MGM)
Best Independent Single or EP	Best New Independent Artist
**The Getaway Plan – "Where the City Meets the Sea"** (Boomtown Records/Shock); Grafton Primary - "Relativity" (Sonic Constructions/MGM); Ricki-Lee Coulter - "Can't Sing a Different Song" (Public Opinion/Shock); Stealing O'Neal – "Collidescope" (BNM Records/Shock); Wolf & Cub – "One to the Other" (Dot Dash/Inertia); Sneaky Sound System – "Kansas City" (Whack Records/MGM)	**Geoffrey Gurrumul Yunupingu**; Drapht; Little Red; Abbe May; A-Love
Best Independent Blues and Roots Release	Best Independent Country Release
**Geoffrey Gurrumul Yunupingu – Gurrumul**; Gin Club – Junk; John Butler – One Step; Lior – Corner of an Endless Road; The Waifs - Sun Dirt Water	**Bec Willis – Bec Willis**; Davidson Brothers – Davidson Brothers; Felicity Urquhart – My Life; The Flood – Everybody's Favourite; Noll Brothers – A Country Heart
Best Independent Dance / Electronic Release	Best Independent Hard Rock/Punk Release
**Peret Mako – The Devil Is in the Detail**; Grafton Primary – Relativity; Meem – The Bumpy EP; Jamie Lloyd – More Trouble; Theatre of Disco – Theatre of Disco	**Eddy Current Suppression Ring – Primary Colours**; Birds of Tokyo – Universes; The Getaway Plan – Other Voices, Other Rooms; Magic Dirt – Girl; Horsell Common – The Rescue
Best Independent Hip Hop/Urban Release	Best Independent Jazz Release
**The Herd – Summerland**; A-Love – Ace of Hearts; Katalyst – Whats Happening; Muph and Plutonic – And Then Tomorrow Came; Resin Dogs – More?	**Tina Harrod – Work Songs**; Gest8 – Koleidoscope; Matt McMahon & Guy Strazz – 2@1; Mike Nock Project – Meeting of the Waters; Jamie Oehlers/Paul Grabowsky/Beck – Lost and Found

== See also ==
- Music of Australia
