= Donny Benét =

Australian musician

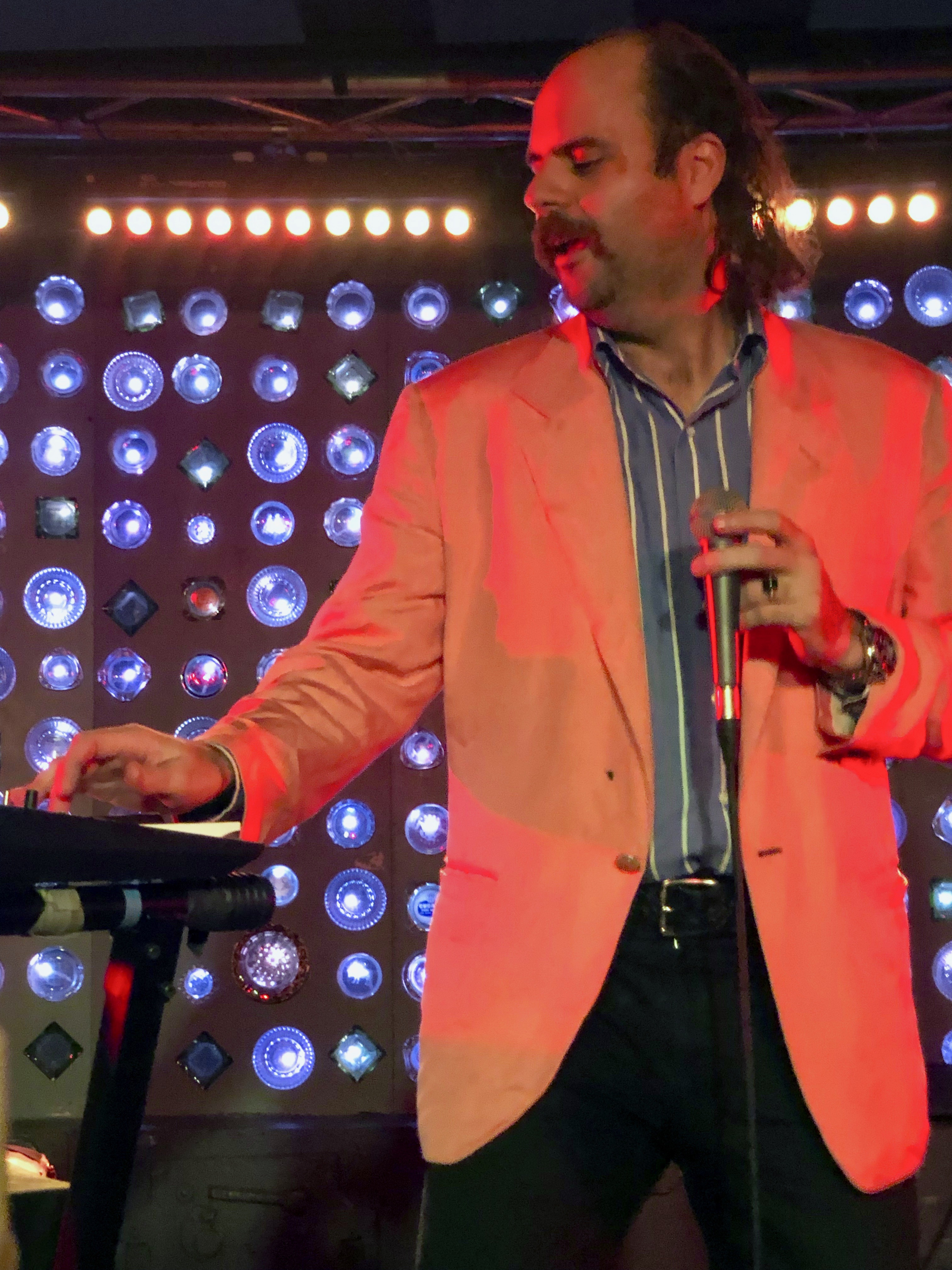
- Donny Benét playing the keyboard for a live performance in Brooklyn, New York

Background information
- Born: Benjamin Waples; August 1981 (age 45)
- Genre: Post-disco
- Instruments: Vocals, electric keyboard, synthesizer, drum machine, accordion, electric bass, double bass
- Years active: 2010–present
- Labels: Rice is Nice, Dot Dash, United Talent Agency, DonnyLand Records
- Website: donnybenet.com

Donny Benét (born Benjamin Waples) is an Australian recording artist, based in Sydney. In 2011, he released his debut studio album Don't Hold Back through indie label Rice is Nice. His fifth studio album, Mr Experience, reached #26 on the ARIA Charts in May 2020.

== Biography ==
Benét was born Benjamin Waples to an Italian mother and a father who, like Benét, is also a musician. According to an NME interview in 2020, Waples developed his Donny Benét persona when he watched an Italian accordionist perform in nursing homes. Prior to his solo career, he played double bass in jazz bands in Sydney.

Benét claims he was exposed to music from an early age as his father Antonio Giacomelli Benét was an Italian Disco accordionist and taught Donny to play the accordion and the electric bass. Benét played his first shows as an accordionist and synth player in Italian bands around Sydney until the mid-2000s.

In 2010, Benét played in Jack Ladder's band The Dreamlanders and began recording his own songs in his studio Donnyland Studios. In 2011 he signed with Rice is Nice records and released Don't Hold Back, which was received with interest from Australian music media publications praising Benét's sincere take on 80s pop music.

In March 2020, Benét's track "Konichiwa" was included on The Weeknd's 'Handpicked Playlist', which highlights 24 songs that inspired his album, After Hours.

In March 2020, Benét announced the release of his fifth studio album Mr. Experience as well as an accompanying tour of Europe and Australia. In April, many of these tour dates were postponed due to the effects of the 2019–20 coronavirus pandemic.

Benét said Mr. Experience was inspired by the stylings of Bryan Ferry and Hiroshi Yoshimura, and to produce the record, he "envisioned the soundtrack to a dinner party set in the late 1980s". Mr.Experience was released on 22 May 2020 and debuted at number 26 on the ARIA Charts, becoming Benét's first release to reach the ARIA top 100.

In 2020, Benét's portrait, painted by Melbourne artist Tom Gerrard, was selected for the Salon des Refusés (Archibald).

In February 2022, Benét released his first new music in almost two years with the instrumental piece titled Le Piano and announced the release of his forthcoming EP of the same name, released on 1 April 2022.

In October 2022, Benét announced a 2023 North American tour for Le Piano from 22 February to 18 March 2023.

=== Influences and musical style ===
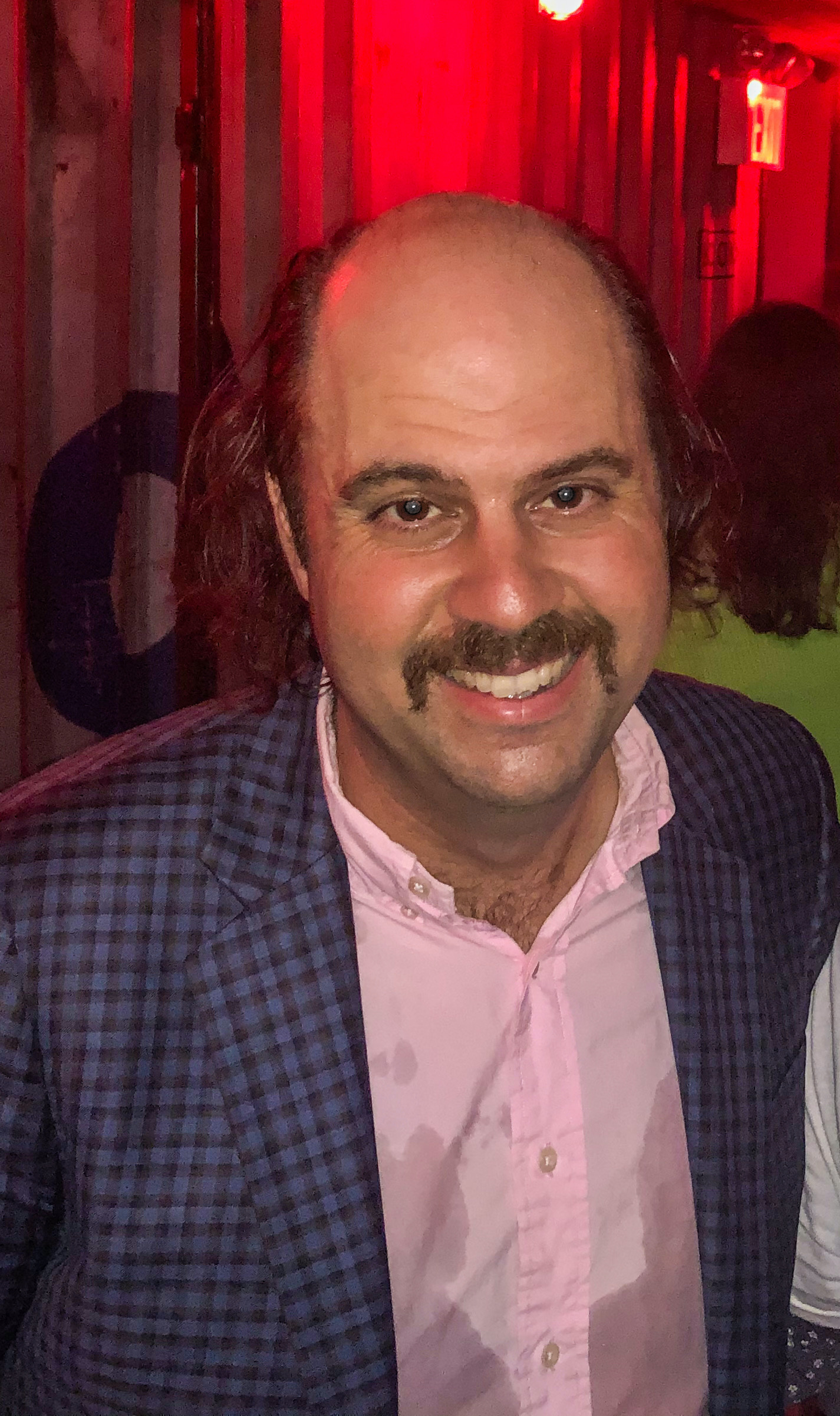
Benét in meet & greet after show in February 2020 at Rough Trade Brooklyn, New York

Benét's music mostly consists of synthesizers, but also features electronic drum machines, saxophone and electric bass, all of which (excluding saxophone) are played by Benét. Benét's influences includes Jan Hammer, Alan Vega, Prince, Eberhard Weber, Bernard Edwards, and Lou Reed, whom Benét credits as his inspiration to sing his own songs. The sexual nature of his lyrics arise from his experiences playing Tom Jones covers in the Airport Hilton Ballroom, Benét writing that he "had to sexualize his songs a lot more to keep (the audience) interested, make them a little bit more risqué, and I think that carried over to my own songs."

In a 2018 interview he explained, "I'm kind of always poking the piss at what a poor lover I am, or, you know, fictitiously what a great lover I could be." Benét was described by KEXP as "a fun, baffling mystery of a performer, one who you’ll find yourself falling in love with from his charisma alone" on the debut of the single "Second Dinner" in August 2019. Following the release of the single "Girl of My Dreams" in January 2020 during the North American Donny Benét Live tour, it was reviewed by Chicago Reader as a single that "is a tender ballad" and "Anchored by a wistful whistle, it has a relaxing feel that makes it perfect for catching your breath with a slow dance."

== Discography ==
=== Studio albums ===
List of studio albums, with selected details and chart positions
Title	Album details	Peak chart positions
Title	Album details	AUS
Don't Hold Back	Released: July 2011; Label: Rice Is Nice Records (RINCD012); Format: CD+ karaoke DVD, digital download	—
Electric Love	Released: September 2012; Label: Rice Is Nice Records (RINCD018); Format: CD, digital download	—
Weekend at Donny's	Released: September 2014; Label: Rice Is Nice; Format: Digital download, streaming	—
The Don	Released: 6 April 2018; Label: Dot Dash (DASH047CD/DASH047LP); Format: CD, LP, digital download, streaming	—
Mr Experience	Released: 22 May 2020; Label: Dot Dash (DASH064CD/DASH064LP); Format: CD, LP, digital download, streaming	26
Infinite Desires	Released: 29 February 2024; Label: Donnyland (DLAND002LP); Format: LP, digital download, streaming	46

=== Extended plays ===
List of EPs, with selected details
Title	EP details	Peak chart positions
Title	EP details	AUS
Le Piano	Released: 1 April 2022; Label: Dot Dash (DOT191EP); Format: CD, LP, streaming	—
Il Basso	Released: 13 February 2026; Label: Donnyland (DLAND006LP); Format: LP, streaming	85

== Awards and nominations ==
=== AIR Awards ===
The Australian Independent Record Awards (commonly known informally as AIR Awards) is an annual awards night to recognise, promote and celebrate the success of Australia's Independent Music sector.

Year	Nominee / work	Award	Result	Ref.
2021	Mr Experience	Best Independent Pop Album or EP	Nominated	
2023	Le Piano	Best Independent Jazz Album or EP	Won	

=== APRA Awards ===
The APRA Awards are presented annually from 1982 by the Australasian Performing Right Association (APRA).

Year	Nominee / work	Award	Result	Ref.
2023	"Le Piano"	Song of the Year	Shortlisted	

=== ARIA Music Awards ===
The ARIA Music Awards is an annual awards ceremony that recognises excellence, innovation, and achievement across all genres of Australian music. Donny Benét has received 3 nominations.

Year	Nominee / work	Award	Result	Ref.
2020	Mr Experience	Best Adult Contemporary Album	Nominated	
2020	Tim Rogers for Mr Experience by Donny Benét	Best Cover Art	Nominated	
2026	Il Basso	Best Jazz Album	Won	

=== National Live Music Awards ===
The National Live Music Awards (NLMAs) are a broad recognition of Australia's diverse live industry, celebrating the success of the Australian live scene. The awards commenced in 2016.

Year	Nominee / work	Award	Result
2016	Himself	Live Bassist of the Year	Won
