= Aronas (band) =

Aronas is an Australian jazz ensemble fronted by New Zealand born pianist Aron Ottignon. They combine jazz with South Pacific drumming. They were nominated for the 2005 ARIA Award for Best Jazz Album for their Culture Tunnels album.

== Members ==
- Aron Ottignon - piano
- David Symes - bass
- Evan Mannell - drums
- Josh Green - percussion

== Discography ==
=== Albums ===
List of albums, with selected details
Title	Details
Culture Tunnels	Released: 2005; Format: CD; Label: Strange/Vitamin

== Awards and nominations ==
=== ARIA Music Awards ===
The ARIA Music Awards is an annual awards ceremony that recognises excellence, innovation, and achievement across all genres of Australian music. They commenced in 1987.

Year	Nominee / work	Award	Result	Ref.
2005	Culture Tunnels	Best Jazz Album	Nominated	
