= George Golla =

Australian jazz guitarist

George Golla AM
- Born: 10 May 1935 (age 89); Chorzów, Poland
- Citizenship: Australia
- Musical career
- Genres: Jazz
- Instrument: Guitar
- Labels: Cherry Pie

George Golla AM (born 10 May 1935) is an Australian jazz guitarist. In 1959 he commenced a long-term working musical partnership with clarinetist/flautist/saxophonist Don Burrows that continued for almost 40 years.

== Biography ==
Golla was born on 10 May 1935 in Chorzów, Poland. He emigrated to Australia in the 1950s and began working in Sydney from 1957.

In 1959, he commenced a long-term working musical partnership with the clarinetist, flautist and saxophonist Don Burrows that continued for almost forty years. They recorded frequently together and in quartets and other combinations. Together they nurtured and featured many young talents, including brassman and multi-instrumentalist James Morrison, guitarist Guy Strazzullo, drummer David Jones and others they taught at the New South Wales Conservatorium.

Golla was a teacher at the Academy of Guitar in Bondi alongside Don Andrews, specialising in jazz and classical guitar. He has written several books on theory, scales and the modes.

Golla toured frequently throughout Australia and at times with international guest support artists such as vibraphonist Gary Burton in the early 1970s. He has had a long association with Brazilian musicians including Luis Bonfa and extensive performance of and many recordings of Latin American-influenced jazz, including the Bonfa Burrows Brazil (The Orchard).

Golla appeared at both the Montreux Jazz Festival and Newport Jazz Festival in 1972 and has performed at many Australian festivals. He is a frequent contributor at the annual Frankston International Guitar Festival.

He has made hundreds of recordings, including The Don Burrows Quartet at the Sydney Opera House (1974, Cherry Pie 1017), and Steph'n'Us (1977, Cherry Pie 1032) with Stephane Grappelli during a tour with Grappelli and Burrows.

Golla continues to perform in and around Sydney where he resides, touring interstate and internationally and recording. He has appeared at many workshops locally, nationally and overseas.

From 2005 to 2015, Golla performed regularly in a duo with Australian jazz flugelhorn player and singer songwriter Elizabeth Geyer.

To celebrate his 80th birthday in 2015, Golla collaborated with Australian jazz singer Jacki Cooper to record a duo album called Tea for Two.

== Discography ==
=== Charting albums ===
List of albums, with Australian chart positions
Title	Album details	Peak chart positions
Title	Album details	AUS
Duo (with Don Burrows)	Released: 1975; Format: LP; Label: Cherry Pie (CPS 1021)	98
Steph 'n' Us (with Don Burrows & Stephane Grappelli)	Released: 1978; Format: LP; Label: Cherry Pie (CPS 1032)	38
Bonfa Burrows Brazil (with Don Burrows & Luis Bonfa)	Released: 1980; Format: LP; Label: Cherry Pie (CPS 1045)	92

== Awards and honours ==
On 10 June 1985, Golla was made a Member of the Order of Australia with the citation "For service to music".

=== ARIA Music Awards ===
The ARIA Music Awards is an annual awards ceremony that recognises excellence, innovation, and achievement across all genres of Australian music. They commenced in 1987.

Year	Nominee / work	Award	Result	Ref.
1987	Lush Life	Best Jazz Album	Won	
