= Mr Experience =

Studio album by Donny Benét
- Released: 22 May 2020
- Length: 39:53
- Label: Dot Dash

Donny Benét chronology
The Don (2018)	Mr Experience (2020)	Le Piano (2022)

Singles from Mr Experience
- 1. "Second Dinner" Released: 15 August 2019; 2. "Girl of My Dreams" Released: 22 January 2020; 3. "Mr Experience" Released: 30 April 2020

Mr Experience is the fifth studio album by Australian post-disco singer, Donny Benét. It was released in May 2020 and peaked at number 26 on the ARIA charts; his first release to chart in the ARIA top 50.

At the 2020 ARIA Music Awards, the album was nominated for Best Adult Contemporary Album and Best Cover Art.

At the AIR Awards of 2021, the album was nominated for Best Independent Jazz Album or EP.

== Reception ==
Professional ratings
Review scores
Source	Rating
NME	3/5 stars
The Music	½

Ali Shutler from NME said "On his fifth studio offering, Benét expertly takes the past and twists it into something modern yet classic".

Guido Farnell from The Music said "Benét's modest vocals know their limits, but he strategically tailors his songs to suit his voice. Singing about eating a lot of food and consequentially getting fat may seem like an odd premise for the song 'Second Dinner', but Benét’s quirky approach shows us that he knows how to charm listeners so that they suspend disbelief for the duration of the song and just enjoy the moment. Mr Experience offers feelgood respite from these strange and uncertain times."

== Track listing ==
All songs written, recorded and performed by Donny Benét

1. "Mr Experience" – 3:55
2. "Moving Up" – 3:47
3. "Second Dinner" – 3:37
4. "Reach Out" – 4:20
5. "Girl of My Dreams" – 4:12
6. "Negroni Summer" – 3:48
7. "One Night in Paradise" – 4:20
8. "Take a Trip" – 3:45
9. "You Don't Need Love – 4:45
10. "Waterfall (Love Scene)" – 3:24

== Charts ==
Chart performance for Mr Experience
Chart (2020)	Peak position
Australian Albums (ARIA)	26
