= Automatic (Mildlife album) =

Studio album by Mildlife
- Released: 18 September 2020
- Length: 41:49
- Label: Inertia
- Producer: Mildlife

Mildlife chronology
Phase (2017)	Automatic (2020)	Live from South Channel Island (2022)

Automatic is the second studio album by Australian psychedelic jazz fusion group, Mildlife. The album was released 18 September 2020 and peaked at number 8 on the ARIA Charts, the group's first ARIA top 100 charting album.

At the 2021 ARIA Music Awards, it won Best Jazz Album. The track "Rare Air" was nominated for best song at the 2020 Music Victoria Awards.

== Reception ==
Professional ratings
Review scores
Source	Rating
Rolling Stone Australia	4.5/5 stars
The AU Review	4/5 stars
Sydney Morning Herald	4/5 stars

Tyler Jenke from Rolling Stone Australia said "Consisting of just six tracks that span a masterful 40 minutes, Automatic is an atmospheric mix of groove-driven psychedelic progressive jazz that shifts between moods as effortlessly as it does instruments." Jenke described the album as "An exercise in euphoria".

Ben Somerford from The AU Review said "Automatic is a fine lesson in restraint and tight finesse. At a time when the world feels foreign, Mildlife's sci-fi alt-rock works perfectly."

Barnaby Smith from Sydney Morning Herald said "Automatic combines elements of prog-rock, such as Jean-Michel Jarre and Mike Oldfield, with the sensual funk of Serge Gainsbourg, touches of classic house music, and indeed the best of DFA Records. On most tracks, synths with that warm and heady vintage feel play a leading role. But as exciting as all this is, the fact that Mildlife mix up genres so exuberantly does not obscure the simple but immensely effective vocal melodies that drift over their bouncy arrangements."

== Track listing ==
All tracks are written by Mildlife

No.	Title	Length
1.	"Rare Air"	6:53
2.	"Vapour"	4:22
3.	"Downstream"	6:21
4.	"Citations"	8:51
5.	"Memory Palace"	6:41
6.	"Automatic"	8:41
Total length:		41:49

== Charts ==
Chart (2020)	Peak position
Australian Albums (ARIA)	8
