= Il Basso =

EP by Donny Benét
- Released: 13 February 2026
- Length: 32:50
- Label: Donnyland Records
- Producer: Donny Benét

Donny Benét chronology
Infinite Desires (2024)	Il Basso (2026)

Il Basso is the second extended play by Australian post-disco singer, Donny Benét. It was released on 13 February 2026.

The album features the bass prominently in several of the tracks.

Music videos for "School's Out" and "Midnight Appointment" were released to promote the release.

At the 2026 ARIA Music Awards, the EP won ARIA Award for Best Jazz Album.

== Track listing ==
All songs written, recorded and performed by Donny Benét.

1. "School's Out - 5:19
2. "Horses - 4:53
3. "Midnight Appointment - 6:00
4. "Mr Tuxedo - 4:44
5. "Bernard's Boogie - 5:44
6. "Winter Sunset - 6:08

== Charts ==
Chart performance for Il Basso
Chart (2026)	Peak position
Australian Albums (ARIA)	85
