= The Great American Songbook (James Morrison album) =

Studio album by James Morrison with BBC Concert Orchestra and Keith Lockhart
- Released: June 2017
- Recorded: 21–23 November 2016
- Studio: Abbey Road Studios
- Length: 69:20
- Label: ABC Jazz

James Morrison albums chronology
James Morrison with His Academy Jazz Orchestra (2016)	The Great American Songbook (2017)	Ella & Louis (2017)

The Great American Songbook is a studio album by Australian jazz musician, James Morrison with the BBC Concert Orchestra and Keith Lockhart. The album was released on 2 June 2017.

At the ARIA Music Awards of 2017, the album won the ARIA Award for Best Jazz Album.

== Track listing ==
1. "I've Got the World on a String" - 6:25
2. "It Don't Mean a Thing (If It Ain't Got That Swing)" - 4:42
3. "Love Is a Many-Splendored Thing" - 7:29
4. "A Foggy Day (In London Town)" - 5:30
5. "Our Love Is Here to Stay" - 3:55
6. "Summertime" - 5:44
7. "They Can't Take That Away from Me" - 7:23
8. "Tenderly" - 2:36
9. "The Way You Look Tonight" - 5:17
10. "A Time for Love" - 5:47
11. "The Shadow of Your Smile" - 6:00
12. "Ev'ry Time We Say Goodbye" - 5:04
13. "My Funny Valentine" - 3:27
