= Andrew Speight Quartet =

Studio album by Andrew Speight Quartet
- Released: October 1998
- Recorded: 1997
- Studio: ABC Ultimo Studio, Sydney
- Label: ABC Jazz/EMI

Andrew Speight Quartet is a self-titled studio album by an Australian jazz group, led by Andrew Speight, which was released in October 1998. The line-up was Speight on alto saxophone, Andrew Dickeson on drums, John Harkins on piano and David Rosin on bass guitar. At the ARIA Music Awards of 1999 it won Best Jazz Album.

== Track listing ==
Andrew Speight Quartet ABC Music/EMI (7243 497778 28)

1. "A Night in Tunisia"
2. "Out of the Past"
3. "Will You Still Be Mine?"
4. "Easy Living"
5. "Ow"
6. "Au Privave"
7. "Distant Dreams"
8. "Quintessence"
9. "Dexterity"
10. "Dear John"
11. "Back to the Old School"

== Personnel ==
- Andrew Speight – alto saxophone
- Andrew Dickeson – drums
- John Harkins – piano
- David Rosin – bass guitar
