= Scott Tinkler =

Australian trumpeter and composer (born 1965)

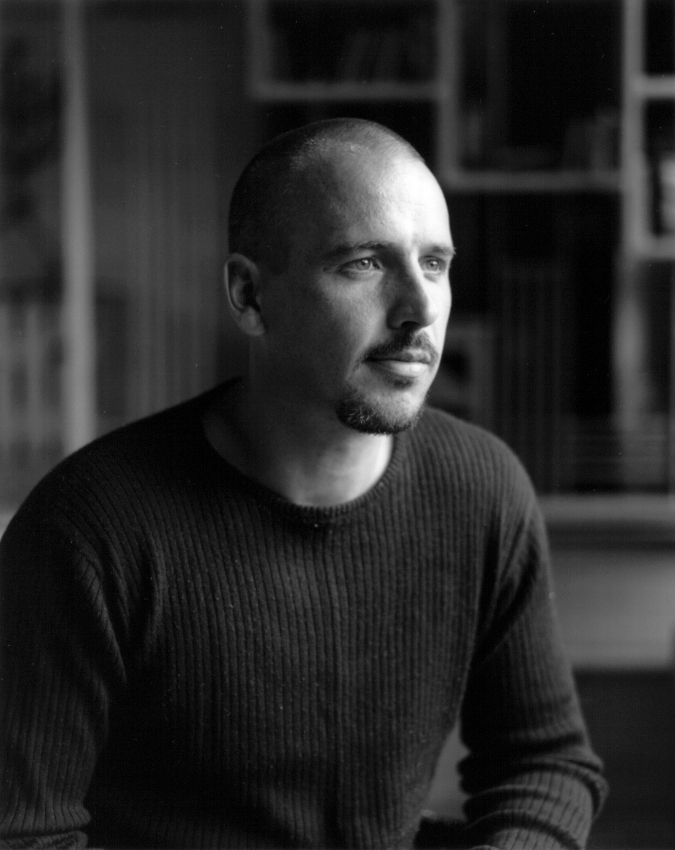
Photo by Andrew Cowan

Scott Tinkler (born 1965, Melbourne, Australia) is an Australian trumpeter and composer. Tinkler has done a range of projects with the composer and violinist John Rodgers, working in ensembles such as Ellision, Hydromus Krysogast and the Antripodean Collective. Notably, Rodgers composed Glass, a concerto featuring Tinkler as soloist performed with the London Sinfonietta, which premiered at the 2010 Adelaide Festival of Arts.

He plays regularly in Australia in duos, trios and quartets with musicians including Marc Hannaford, Simon Barker, Paul Grabowsky, Erkki Veltheim, Ken Eadie and Carl Dewhurst. Tinkler is also involved in an ongoing solo project that uses extended and prepared techniques; his first solo trumpet album called Backwards was released by Extreme in 2007, followed by the self-released album Goose to Goose in 2021. He is a founding member and previous Associate Artistic Director of the Australian Art Orchestra

== Career ==
=== 1990s ===
In the early 1990s, Tinkler performed and studied with Australian tenor saxophonist, Mark Simmonds, who had studied with George Coleman in New York. Simmonds introduced Tinkler to extended practice on the cycle of 5ths using many harmonic substitutions involving the diminished substitution theory, rhythm cycles and polyrhythms as a basis for his highly fuelled jazz-based music, which can be traced to earlier developments by John Coltrane.

Throughout Tinkler's career he has been interested in not only exploring and developing improvised music stemming from jazz, but also other forms of music and the cultures they come from. This has led to musical collaborations with Indian and Korean musicians, as well as with indigenous musicians from Australia.

Beginning in 1995, Tinkler's involvement with Indian Carnatic musicians (led by Guru Kaaraikkudi) has evolved into a longstanding and deep association. Tinkler has travelled to India five times for performances, as well as touring Australia and Europe with the project.

=== 2000s ===
Tinkler has collaborated with a range of international artists over the past decade including Jason Moran, Tim Berne, Mark Helias, Anthony Burr, Tony Buck, Oscar Noriega and Han Bennink.

In 2003 Tinkler travelled with his longtime associate Paul Grabowsky to New York to record an album of Grabowsky's original music with Branford Marsalis, Joe Lovano, Ed Schuller and Jeff "Tain" Watts. Tales of Time and Space was released on the Warner label to stunning reviews, many highlighting Tinkler's unique contribution to Grabowsky's music.

In 2006 Tinkler attended the Garma Festival, which celebrates the cultural inheritance of the Yolngu People, the indigenous Australians of Northeast Arnhem Land. The festival is held at Gulkula, near Yirrkala in the Australian outback. At this festival Tinkler collaborated with musicians from the Wagalik group, performing and workshopping. Tinkler has since been involved in touring and performing with these musicians in collaboration with the Australian Art Orchestra.

== Personal life ==
Tinkler is married to the Australian artist Veronica Kent. They live on a remote island in Tasmania, Australia.

== Discography ==
=== Albums ===
List of albums, with selected details
| Title | Details |
|---|---|
| Hop to the Cow (as Scott Tinkler Quartet) | Released: 1995; Format: CD; Label: ORiGiN (OR 013) |
| Dance of Delulian | Released: 1996; Format: CD; Label: ORiGiN (OR028) |
| In Future Today (as Chaplin/Tinkler/Rex/Lambie) | Released: 1998; Format: CD; Label: Jazzhead (MUSH33082.2) |
| Sofa King | Released: 1998; Format: CD; Label: Buzz-Records (ZZ 76001) |
| Made By Mates (Victor De Boo featuring Dale Barlow & Scott Tinkler) | Released: 1998; Format: CD; Label: Disckus Records (DP 012) |
| Sofa King (as Scott Tinkler Trio) | Released: 2000; Format: CD; Label: Scott Tinkler Trio (1999SL) |
| Lost Thoughts (with Simon Barker) | Released: 2007; Format: CD; Label: Kimnara Records (NARA008) |
| Backwards | Released: 2007; Format: CD; Label: Extreme (XCD 058) |
| Ordinary Madness (with Marc Hannaford, Tim Berne, Simon Barker & Philip Rex) | Released: 2012; Format: CD; Label: Extreme (XCD 058) |
| Faceless Dullard (with Marc Hannaford & Simon Barker) | Released: March 2013; Format: CD; Label: Marchon (004) |
| Improvisations and Comprovisations (with Michael Hannan & Mic Deacon) | Released: 2013; Format: CD; Label: Wirripang – (Wirr 051) |
| Faceless Dullard (with Erkki Veltheim & Marc Hannaford) | Released: November 2013; Format: CD; Label: self-released |
| Live in Mumbai (James Ryan featuring Steve Hunter, Ken Edie & Scott Tinkler ) | Released: 2020; Format: CD; Label: Rippa Recordings (RR1007) |
| The Scotts (with Scott McConnachie) | Released: 2020; Format: Digital; Label: self-released |
| Two Part Interventions (with Erkki Veltheim) | Released: 2020; Format: Digital; Label: self-released |
| WILLIWAW (with Jenny Barnes) | Released: 2021; Format: Digital; Label: self-released |
| Goose to Goose | Released: 2021; Format: Digital; Label: self-released |

== Awards ==
=== ARIA Music Awards ===
The ARIA Music Awards is an annual awards ceremony that recognises excellence, innovation, and achievement across all genres of Australian music. They commenced in 1987.

| Year | Nominee / work | Award | Result | Ref. |
|---|---|---|---|---|
| 1997 | Dance of Delulian (as Scott Tinkler Trio) | Best Jazz Album | Nominated | |
| 1998 | In Future Today (as Chaplin, Tinkler, Rex, Lambie) | Best Jazz Album | Won | |
| 1999 | Sofa King (as Scott Tinkler Trio) | Best Jazz Album | Nominated | |

== Other sources ==
- "Jazz". Abc.net.au.
- "All About Jazz Music, Musicians, Bands & Albums". Allaboutjazz.com.
