= Wizards of Oz =

- Origin: Australia
- Genres: Jazz
- Years active: 1987–1989
- Labels: EmArcy, Polygram Jazz
- Past members: Dale Barlow; Tony Buck; Paul Grabowsky; Lloyd Swanton

Wizards of Oz were a briefly existing Australian jazz quartet from the late 1980s. The members were Dale Barlow on tenor saxophone, Paul Grabowsky on piano and the Necks' bandmates Lloyd Swanton on bass and Tony Buck on drums. They released one album, Soundtrack (1988), which won the 1989 ARIA Award for Best Jazz Album. In 2017 Mal Stanley of Jazztrack on ABC Jazz described it as "a standout album in the Australian Jazz pantheon, and it inspired many young local players at the time of its release."

== Members ==
- Dale Barlow – tenor saxophone
- Tony Buck – drums
- Paul Grabowsky – piano
- Lloyd Swanton – bass

== Discography ==
List of albums
Title	Album details
Soundtrack	Released: 1988; Label: EmArcy, Polygram Jazz (834 531-1, 834 531-2); Formats: LP, CD

== Awards ==
=== ARIA Music Awards ===
The ARIA Music Awards is an annual awards ceremony that recognises excellence, innovation, and achievement across all genres of Australian music. They commenced in 1987.

Year	Nominee / work	Award	Result	Ref.
1989	Soundtrack	Best Jazz Album	Won	
