= Le Piano =

EP by Donny Benét
- Released: 1 April 2022
- Length: 21:16
- Label: Dot Dash

Donny Benét chronology
Mr Experience (2020)	Le Piano (2022)	Infinite Desires (2024)

Le Piano is the first extended play by Australian post-disco singer, Donny Benét. It was released in April 2022.

All four tracks are instrumental pieces, composed and recorded entirely solo, with Benét working a purpose-built studio of vintage synths and drum machines. Benét said "I wanted to create a short EP of instrumentals reflective of the music that has helped me navigate touring life, and life at home for the past years. For me, I really enjoy the headspace that instrumental music can put you in."

At the AIR Awards of 2023, the EP won Best Independent Jazz Album or EP.

Its title track was shorted for the 2023 APRA Music Awards Song of the Year.

== Track listing ==
All songs written, recorded and performed by Donny Benét

1. "Le Piano" – 5:05
2. "Cappuccino" – 5:40
3. "Forgotten Spring" – 5:31
4. "Passenger" – 5:00
