= Soundtrack (Wizards of Oz album) =

Studio album by Wizards of Oz
- Released: 1988
- Genre: Jazz
- Label: Polygram Jazz, Emarcy
- Producer: Dale Barlow, Paul Grabowsky, Lloyd Swanton, Tony Buck

Soundtrack is the first and only studio album by Australian recording jazz quartet Wizards of Oz.

At the ARIA Music Awards of 1989, the album won ARIA Award for Best Jazz Album.

== Track listing ==
No.	Title	Writer(s)	Length
1.	"Visby"	Dale Barlow	9:39
2.	"Coal for Cook"	Paul Grabowsky	6:51
3.	"Horace"	Grobowsky	6:14
4.	"None of the Above"	Barlow	3:47
5.	"Nothing's Enough"	Barlow	6:39
6.	"Where Can I Park My Horse"	Grabowsky	5:46
7.	"Leaving"	Barlow	4:50

== Release history ==
Country	Date	Format	Label	Catalogue
Australia	1988	LP; CD	Polygram Jazz, Emarcy	834531-1, 834531-2
