= Maree Montgomery =

Australian jazz singer

- Born: Australia
- Genres: Jazz
- Occupation: Singer

Maree Montgomery is an Australian jazz singer. She was nominated for 1987 ARIA Award for Best Jazz Album with her album Woman Of Mystery.

== Discography ==
=== Albums ===
List of albums, with selected details
Title	Details
In Good Company (with the Serge Ermoll Quartet featuring Peter Dilosa)	Released: 1980; Format: LP; Label: Astor (ALPS 1066)
Woman of Mystery	Released: 1986; Format: LP; Label: Festival Records
Sweet 'n Hot	Released: 1992; Format: CD; Label: Polydor
The Best of Maree Montgomery	Released: 1992; Format: CD

== Awards and nominations ==
=== ARIA Music Awards ===
The ARIA Music Awards is an annual awards ceremony that recognises excellence, innovation, and achievement across all genres of Australian music. They commenced in 1987.

Year	Nominee / work	Award	Result	Ref.
1987	Woman of Mystery	Best Jazz Album	Nominated	
