= Mildlife =

Australian psychedelic jazz fusion group

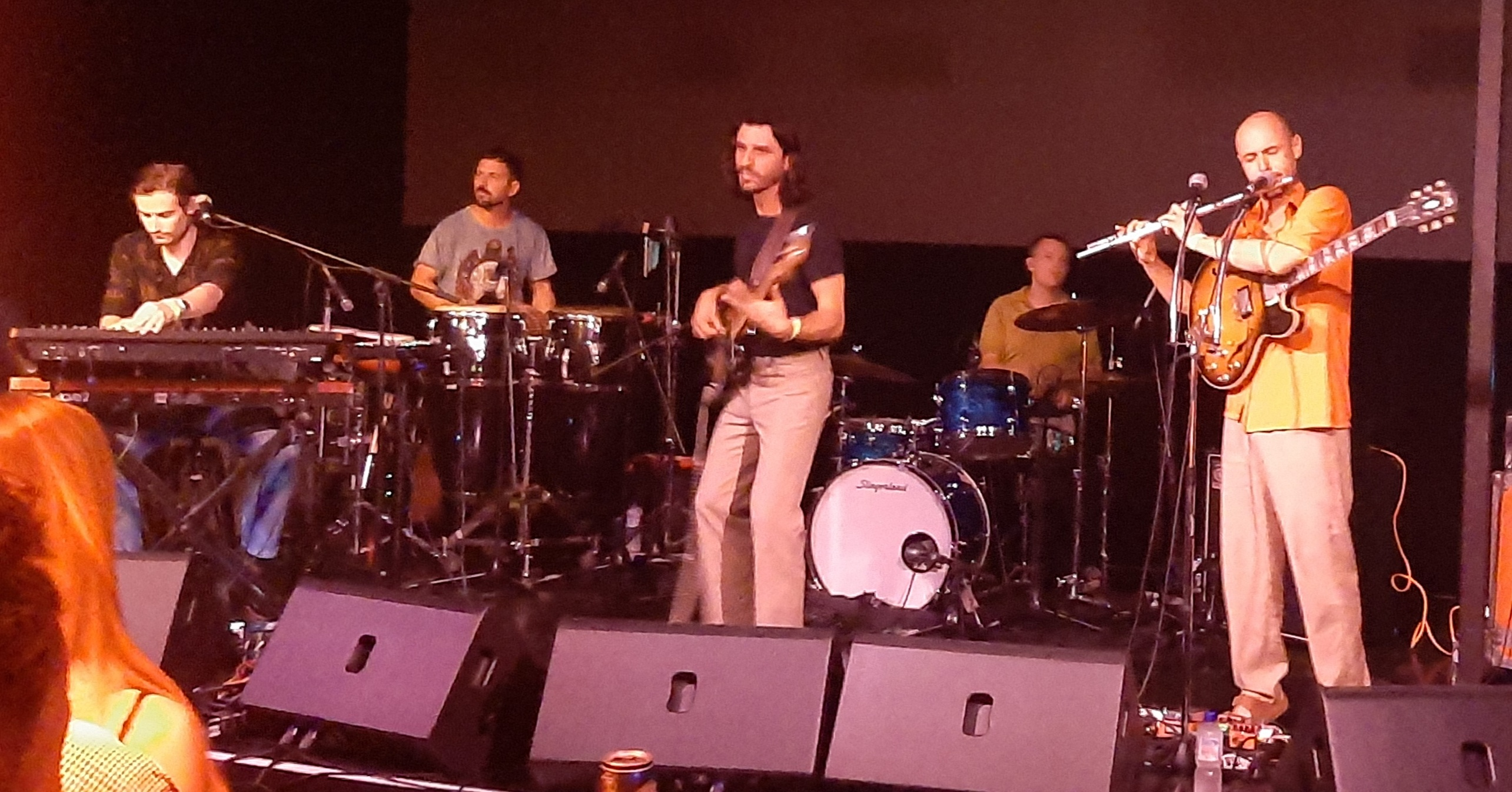
- Mildlife performing in Melbourne (Feb 2022)

Background information
- Origin: Melbourne, Australia
- Genres: Progressive rock; jazz fusion; psychedelic rock; psychedelic funk; disco; space rock; jazz-funk
- Years active: 2010–present
- Labels: Inertia, Heavenly
- Members: Tomas Shanahan, Kevin McDowell, Jim Rindfleish, Adam Halliwell
- Past members: James Donald, Dale Bordin, Maria Moles
- Website: https://www.mildlife.com.au/

Mildlife are a Melbourne-based, Australian psychedelic jazz fusion group formed in 2010. The group have released three studio albums. The current lineup is Tomas Shanahan - Bass Guitar, Kevin McDowell - Electric Piano [Rhodes], Synthesizer, Jim Rindfleish - Drums, Engineer, Adam Halliwell - Guitar, Flute, Vocoder.

The group released their third studio album, Chorus in March 2024.

== Discography ==
=== Albums ===
List of studio albums with Australian chart positions
Title	Details	Peak chart positions
Title	Details	AUS
Phase	Released: 2 November 2017; Label: Research Records (RESEARCH02); Formats: CD, LP, digital, streaming	—
Automatic	Released: 18 September 2020; Label: Mildlife, Inertia, Heavenly Recordings (IR5263CD); Formats: CD, LP, digital, streaming	8
Chorus	Released: 1 March 2024; Label: Mildlife, PIAS, Heavenly (HVNLP222); Formats: CD, LP, digital, streaming	36

=== Live albums ===
List of live albums with Australian chart positions
Title	Details	Peak chart positions
Title	Details	AUS
Live from South Channel Island	Released: 29 April 2022; Label: Mildlife, Heavenly (HVNLP199); Formats: CD, 2×LP, digital, streaming	29

=== Extended plays ===
List of EPs
Title	Details
Mildlife Remixed EP	Released: 17 August 2018; Label: Research (RREP01); Formats: LP, digital, streaming
Phase II	Released: 14 September 2018; Label: Research (RREP02); Formats: LP, digital, streaming

=== Singles ===
Year	Title	Album
2017	"The Magnificent Moon"	Phase
2019	"How Long Does it Take"	
2020	"Rare Air"	Automatic
2020	"Vapour"	Automatic
2020	"Automatic"	Automatic
2023	"Return to Centaurus"	Chorus
2023	"Musica"	Chorus
2024	"Yourself"	Chorus

== Awards and nominations ==
=== AIR Awards ===
The Australian Independent Record Awards (known colloquially as the AIR Awards) is an annual awards night to recognise, promote and celebrate the success of Australia's Independent Music sector.

Year	Nominee / work	Award	Result	Ref.
2021	Automatic	Best Independent Jazz Album or EP	Nominated	
2023	Live from South Channel Island	Best Independent Jazz Album or EP	Nominated	

=== ARIA Music Awards ===
The ARIA Music Awards is an annual ceremony presented by Australian Recording Industry Association (ARIA), which recognise excellence, innovation, and achievement across all genres of the music of Australia. They commenced in 1987.

Year	Nominee / work	Award	Result	Ref.
2021	Automatic	Best Jazz Album	Won	
2022	Live from South Channel Island	Best Jazz Album	Won	
2024	Chorus	Best Jazz Album	Won	
2024	Tony Buchen for Mildlife – Chorus	Best Engineered Release	Nominated	
2024	Tomas Shanahan for Mildlife – Chorus	Best Cover Art	Nominated	

=== Music Victoria Awards ===
The Music Victoria Awards, are an annual awards night celebrating Victorian music. The commenced in 2005.

Year	Nominee / work	Award	Result	Ref.
2018	Mildlife	Breakthrough Act of 2018	Nominated	
2018	Phase	Best Soul, Funk, R'n'B and Gospel Album	Nominated	
2018	Mildlife	Best Electronic Act	Won	
2019	Mildlife	Best Electronic Act	Nominated	
2020	"Rare Air"	Best Victorian Song	Nominated	
2021	Mildlife	Best Group	Nominated	
2021	Mildlife	Best Live Act	Nominated	
2024	Mildlife	Soul, Funk, RNB & Gospel Work	Nominated	

=== National Live Music Awards ===
The National Live Music Awards (NLMAs) commenced in 2016 to recognise contributions to the live music industry in Australia.

Year	Nominee / work	Award	Result	Ref.
2023	Mildlife	Best Jazz Act	Nominated	
