= ARIA Award for Best Jazz Album =

Annual Australian music industry award

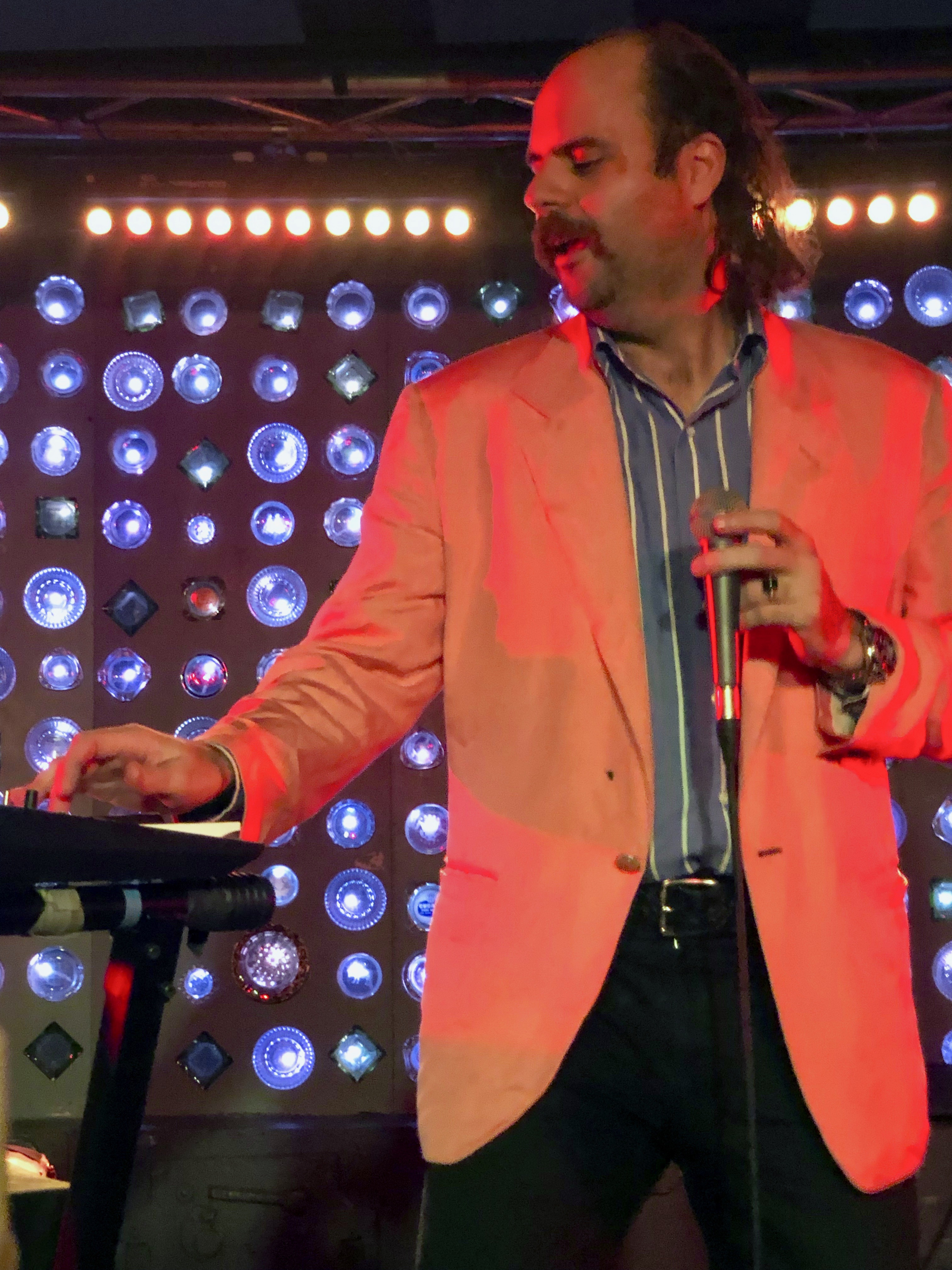
- 2026 winner Donny Benét
- Country: Australia
- Presented by: Australian Recording Industry Association (ARIA)
- First award: 1987
- Currently held by: Donny Benét – Il Basso (2026)
- Website: ariaawards.com.au

The ARIA Music Award for Best Jazz Album is an award presented within the Fine Arts Awards at the annual ARIA Music Awards.

The award for Best Jazz Album was first presented in 1987, when George Golla Orchestra, received a trophy for their album, Lush Life (1987). Paul Grabowsky has won the award seven times in various guises (leader of the Paul Grabowsky Trio, Paul Grabowsky Sextet, duet with Vince Jones, duet with Katie Noonan, duet with Kate Ceberano and as a member of Wizards Of Oz).

== Winners and nominees ==
In the following table, the winner is highlighted in a separate colour, and in boldface; the nominees are those that are not highlighted or in boldface.

Winner marked in a separate colour

Year	Winner(s)	Album title
**1987** (1st)
**1987** (1st)	**The George Golla Orchestra**	**Lush Life**
**1987** (1st)	Various Artists	The Esso Australian Jazz Summit
**1987** (1st)	Dick Hughes	The Last Train For Casablanca Leaves Once In A Blue Moon
**1987** (1st)	Vince Jones	Tell Me a Secret
**1987** (1st)	Maree Montgomery	Woman of Mystery
**1988** (2nd)	**Vince Jones**	**It All Ends Up in Tears**
**1988** (2nd)	The Don Burrows Quintet with the Adelaide Connection	Nice 'n' Easy
**1989** (3rd)
**1989** (3rd)	**Wizards of Oz**	**Soundtrack**
**1989** (3rd)	Kate Ceberano & Wendy Matthews	You've Always Got The Blues
**1989** (3rd)	Cool Dudes	Cool Dudes
**1989** (3rd)	James Morrison	Postcards From Down Under
**1989** (3rd)	Various Artists	Jazz Live At Soup Plus
**1990** (4th)
**1990** (4th)	**Paul Grabowsky Trio**	**Six by Three**
**1990** (4th)	Allan Browne	Genre Jumping Jazz
**1990** (4th)	James Morrison Swiss Encounter	Live at the Montreaux Jazz Festival
**1990** (4th)	Various Artists	Jim McLeod's Jazz Tracks
**1990** (4th)	Vince Jones	Trustworthy Little Sweethearts
**1991** (5th)
**1991** (5th)	**Clarion Fracture Zone**	**Blue Shift**
**1991** (5th)	**The Last Straw**	**The Last Straw**
**1991** (5th)	Dale Barlow	Horn
**1991** (5th)	James Morrison	Snappy Doo
**1991** (5th)	Paul Grabowsky	The Moon And You
**1992** (6th)
**1992** (6th)	**Dale Barlow**	**Hipnotation**
**1992** (6th)	Ten Part Invention	Ten Part Invention
**1992** (6th)	Mike Nock Quartet	Dark And Curious
**1992** (6th)	James Morrison	Manner Dangerous
**1992** (6th)	Carl Orr	Seeking Spirit
**1993** (7th)
**1993** (7th)	**Bernie McGann Trio**	**Bernie McGann Trio**
**1993** (7th)	Vince Jones	Future Girl
**1993** (7th)	Paul Grabowsky	Tee Vee
**1993** (7th)	Judy Bailey	Notwithstanding
**1993** (7th)	James Morrison & Ray Brown	Two The Max!
**1994** (8th)
**1994** (8th)	**Mike Bukovsky**	**Wanderlust**
**1994** (8th)	Mike Nock	Touch
**1994** (8th)	Judy Bailey	Sundial
**1994** (8th)	The Catholics	The Catholics
**1994** (8th)	AtmaSphere	Flying
**1995** (9th)
**1995** (9th)	**Mark Simmonds Freeboppers**	**Fire**
**1995** (9th)	**Bernie McGann Trio**	**McGann McGann**
**1995** (9th)	Bobby Gebert Trio	The Sculptor
**1995** (9th)	Australian Art Orchestra	Ringing The Ball Backwards
**1995** (9th)	The Allan Browne Quartet	Birdcalls
**1996** (10th)
**1996** (10th)	**Paul Grabowsky Trio**	**When Words Fail**
**1996** (10th)	The Engine Room	Full Steam Ahead
**1996** (10th)	Bob Bertles Quintet	Rhythm Of The Heart
**1996** (10th)	Bob Barnard	Live At The Sydney Opera House
**1996** (10th)	Barney McAll	Exit
**1997** (11th)
**1997** (11th)	**Bernie McGann Trio**	**Playground**
**1997** (11th)	Scott Tinkler Trio	Dance Of Delulian
**1997** (11th)	Ian Chaplin Quartet	Tjapangati
**1997** (11th)	Col Nolan	Nolans Groove
**1997** (11th)	Clarion Fracture Zone	Less Stable Elements
**1997** (11th)	The Catholics	Life On Earth
**1998** (12th)
**1998** (12th)	**Chaplin, Tinkler, Rex, Lambie**	**The Future In Today**
**1998** (12th)	Shelley Scown & The Paul Grabowsky Trio	Angel
**1998** (12th)	Rolf Stube	The Jazz Police
**1998** (12th)	Kevin Hunt	Plays JS Bach
**1998** (12th)	Joe Chindamo	Anyone Who Had A Heart
**1999** (13th)
**1999** (13th)	**Andrew Speight Quartet**	**Andrew Speight Quartet**
**1999** (13th)	Scott Tinkler Trio	Sofa King
**1999** (13th)	Janet Seidel	The Way You Wear Your Hat
**1999** (13th)	Jamie Oehlers	Strut
**1999** (13th)	Browne Haywood Stevens	Sudden In A Shaft Of Sunlight
**2000** (14th)
**2000** (14th)	**James Muller Trio**	**All Out**
**2000** (14th)	Mike Nock & Marty Ehrlich	The Waiting Game
**2000** (14th)	Janet Seidel	Art Of Lounge Vol 2
**2000** (14th)	The Catholics	Barefoot
**2000** (14th)	Australian Art Orchestra, Sruthi Laya Ensemble	Into The Fire
**2001** (15th)
**2001** (15th)	**Bernie McGann Trio**	**Bundeena**
**2001** (15th)	Paul Grabowsky Trio	Three
**2001** (15th)	Michelle Nicolle	After The Rain
**2001** (15th)	Joe Chindamo Trio	The Joy Of Standards
**2001** (15th)	Andrew Robson Trio	Sunman
**2001** (15th)	Allan Browne's New Rascals	East St Kilda Toodleoo
**2002** (16th)
**2002** (16th)	**Andrea Keller**	**Thirteen Sketches**
**2002** (16th)	The Umbrellas	Bravo Nino Rota
**2002** (16th)	James Muller	Thrum
**2002** (16th)	James Morrison	Scream Machine
**2002** (16th)	Dale Barlow	Dale Barlow Live
**2003** (17th)
**2003** (17th)	**Andrea Keller**	**Mikrokosmos**
**2003** (17th)	The World According To James	Wayback
**2003** (17th)	The Necks	Athenaeum, Homebush, Quay & Raab
**2003** (17th)	Kevin Hunt Trio	Love Walked In
**2003** (17th)	Andrew Robson	On
**2004** (18th)
**2004** (18th)	**The Necks**	**Drive By**
**2004** (18th)	Paul Grabowsky	Tales of Time and Space
**2004** (18th)	Mike Nock's Big Small Band	Big Small Band Live
**2004** (18th)	Michelle Nicolle	The Crying Game
**2004** (18th)	Alister Spence Trio	Flux
**2005** (19th)
**2005** (19th)	**Paul Grabowsky & Katie Noonan**	**Before Time Could Change Us**
**2005** (19th)	The Necks	Mosquito/See Through
**2005** (19th)	Oehlers & Keevers	Grace
**2005** (19th)	Aronas	Culture Tunnels
**2005** (19th)	Andrea Keller Quartet	Angels and Rascals
**2006** (20th)
**2006** (20th)	**The Necks**	**Chemist**
**2006** (20th)	Paul Grabowsky & Bernie McGann	Always
**2006** (20th)	Mark Sholtez	Real Street
**2006** (20th)	James Muller	Kaboom
**2006** (20th)	Don Burrows, The Mell-O-Tones & Phillip Sametz	Non Stop Flight - Great Music Of The Swing Era
**2007** (21st)
**2007** (21st)	**Mike Nock & Dave Liebman**	**Duologue**
**2007** (21st)	Mark Isaacs	Resurgence
**2007** (21st)	Joe Chindamo & Graeme Lyall	Smokingun
**2007** (21st)	Andrea Keller Quartet	Little Claps
**2007** (21st)	Alister Spence Trio	Mercury
**2008** (22nd)
**2008** (22nd)	**Andrea Keller**	**Footprints**
**2008** (22nd)	Oehlers, Grabowsky & Beck	Lost And Found
**2008** (22nd)	Mike Nock Project	Meeting Of The Waters
**2008** (22nd)	Joe Chindamo	Duende The Romantic Project
**2008** (22nd)	Grace Knight	Willow
**2008** (22nd)	Deni Hines & James Morrison	The Other Woman
**2009** (23rd)
**2009** (23rd)	**Katie Noonan**	**Blackbird: The Music of Lennon and McCartney**
**2009** (23rd)	Michelle Nicolle	The Loveliest Night
**2009** (23rd)	Mark Isaacs Resurgence Band	Tell It Like It Is
**2009** (23rd)	Kate Ceberano & Mark Isham	Bittersweet
**2009** (23rd)	Dale Barlow, George Coleman Jr, Mark Fitzgibbon & Sam Anning	Treat Me Gently
**2010** (24th)
**2010** (24th)	**James Morrison & The Idea Of North**	**Feels Like Spring**
**2010** (24th)	The Necks	Silverwater
**2010** (24th)	Joseph Tawadros	The Hour of Separation
**2010** (24th)	Joe Chindamo	Another Place Some Other Time
**2010** (24th)	Dick & Christa Hughes	Twenty First Century Blues
**2011** (25th)
**2011** (25th)	**Elixir**	**First Seed Ripening**
**2011** (25th)	The Idea of North	Extraordinary Tale
**2011** (25th)	Sarah McKenzie	Don't Tempt Me
**2011** (25th)	Kristin Berardi & The Jazzgroove Mothership Orchestra	Kristin Berardi Meets The Jazzgroove Mothership Orchestra
**2011** (25th)	Allan Browne, Marc Hannaford, Sam Anning	Shreveport Stomp
**2012** (26th)
**2012** (26th)	**Sarah McKenzie**	**Close Your Eyes**
**2012** (26th)	James Morrison	Snappy Too
**2012** (26th)	Bernie McGann	Wending
**2012** (26th)	Grace Knight	Keep Cool Fool
**2012** (26th)	Barney McAll	Graft
**2012** (26th)	Steven Rossitto	Night & Day
**2013** (27th)
**2013** (27th)	**The Idea of North**	**Smile**
**2013** (27th)	Tommy Emmanuel & Martin Taylor	The Colonel & The Governor
**2013** (27th)	Renee Geyer	Swing
**2013** (27th)	Jonathan Zwartz	The Remembering & Forgetting of the Air
**2013** (27th)	Andrea Keller	Family Portraits
**2014** (28th)
**2014** (28th)	**Paul Grabowsky Sextet**	**The Bitter Suite**
**2014** (28th)	Andrea Keller Quartet with Strings	Wave Rider
**2014** (28th)	Emma Pask	Season Of My Heart
**2014** (28th)	Graeme Lyall, John Hoffman, Tony Gould, Ben Robertson, Tony Floyd	The Hunters & Pointers
**2014** (28th)	Vince Jones	The Monash Sessions
**2015** (29th)
**2015** (29th)	**Barney McAll**	**Mooroolbark**
**2015** (29th)	Allan Browne Quintet	Ithaca Bound
**2015** (29th)	King Gizzard & the Lizard Wizard	Quarters!
**2015** (29th)	Paul Grabowsky	Solo
**2015** (29th)	Sarah McKenzie	We Could Be Lovers
**2016** (30th)
**2016** (30th)	**Vince Jones & Paul Grabowsky**	**Provanance**
**2016** (30th)	Don Burrows & James Morrison	In Good Company
**2016** (30th)	Emma Pask	Cosita Divina
**2016** (30th)	Stu Hunter	The Migration
**2016** (30th)	The Idea of North	Ballads
**2017** (31st)
**2017** (31st)	**James Morrison (with BBC Concert Orchestra and Keith Lockhart)**	**The Great American Songbook**
**2017** (31st)	Australian Art Orchestra	Water Pushes Sand
**2017** (31st)	James Morrison & James Morrison Academy Jazz Orchestra	James Morrison With His Academy Jazz Orchestra
**2017** (31st)	King Gizzard & the Lizard Wizard	Sketches Of Brunswick East
**2017** (31st)	The Vampires	The Vampires meet Lionel Loueke
**2018** (32nd)
**2018** (32nd)	**Jonathan Zwartz**	**Animarum**
**2018** (32nd)	Barney McAll	Hearing the Blood
**2018** (32nd)	Elixir featuring Katie Noonan	Gratitude and Grief
**2018** (32nd)	Jake Mason Trio	The Stranger in the Mirror
**2018** (32nd)	James Morrison, Patti Austin, Melbourne Symphony Orchestra & Benjamin Northey	Ella and Louis
**2019** (33rd)
**2019** (33rd)	**Kate Ceberano and Paul Grabowsky**	**Tryst**
**2019** (33rd)	Andrea Keller	Transients Vol.1
**2019** (33rd)	Angela Davis	Little Did They Know
**2019** (33rd)	Barney McAll	Zephyrix
**2019** (33rd)	Phil Slater	The Dark Pattern
**2020** (34th)
**2020** (34th)	**Paul Kelly** & **Paul Grabowsky**	**Please Leave Your Light On**
**2020** (34th)	Katie Noonan	The Sweetest Taboo
**2020** (34th)	Luke Howard	All That Is Not Solid (Live At Tempo Rubato, Australia / 2020)
**2020** (34th)	Mike Nock, Hamish Stuart, Julien Wilson, Jonathan Zwartz	This World
**2020** (34th)	Nat Bartsch	Forever More
**2021** (35th)
**2021** (35th)	**Mildlife**	**Automatic**
**2021** (35th)	Australian Art Orchestra, Reuben Lewis, Tariro Mavondo & Peter Knight	Closed Beginnings
**2021** (35th)	Kristen Beradi, Sean Foran & Rafael Karlen	Haven
**2021** (35th)	Petra Haden and the Nick Haywood Quintet	Songs from my Father
**2021** (35th)	Vazesh	The Sacred Key
**2022** (36th)
**2022** (36th)	**Mildlife**	**Live from South Channel Island**
**2022** (36th)	Barney McAll	Precious Energy
**2022** (36th)	Mike Nock, Hamish Stuart, Julien Wilson & Jonathan Zwartz	Another Dance
**2022** (36th)	Sam Anning	Oaatchapai
**2022** (36th)	Springtime	Springtime
**2023** (37th)
**2023** (37th)	**The Vampires featuring Chris Abrahams**	**Nightjar**
**2023** (37th)	Lance Gurisik	Cull Portal
**2023** (37th)	Mike Nock	Hearing
**2023** (37th)	Sinj Clarke	The Height Of Love
**2023** (37th)	Surprise Chef	Education & Recreation
**2024** (38th)
**2024** (38th)	**Mildlife**	**Chorus**
**2024** (38th)	Audrey Powne	From the Fire
**2024** (38th)	Elixir (featuring Katie Noonan, Zac Hurren & Ben Hauptmann)	A Small Shy Truth
**2024** (38th)	Tourismo	Torque
**2024** (38th)	Vanessa Perica Orchestra	The Eye is the First Circle
**2025** (39th)
**2025** (39th)	**Lucy Clifford**	**Between Spaces of Knowing**
**2025** (39th)	Evans Robson Quartet	Zenith
**2025** (39th)	Lachlan McKenzie	Departures
**2025** (39th)	TL;DR and Peter Knight	Too Long; Didn't Read
**2025** (39th)	Touch Sensitive	In Paradise
**2026** (40th)
**2026** (40th)	**Donny Benét**	**Il Basso**
**2026** (40th)	Hilary Geddes	Redleaf
**2026** (40th)	Lauren Tsamouras and Tom Avegenicos	For Judy
**2026** (40th)	Ten Part Invention	Time is Moved
**2026** (40th)	The Vampires	Skydancer
