= Rolf Stube =

Australian jazz bassist

Rolf Stübe
- Genres: Jazz
- Occupation: Bassist

Rolf Stübe was an Australian jazz bassist. At the ARIA Music Awards of 1998, he was nominated for ARIA Award for Best Jazz Album for Rolf Stübe and the Jazz Police. It was recorded with John Harkins (piano), Warwick Alder (trumpet), Alan Turnbull (drums) and Jason Morphett (saxophones). Stübe died soon after the recording of the album.

== Discography ==
=== Albums ===
List of albums, with selected details
Title	Details
Rolf Stübe and the Jazz Police	Released: 1997; Format: CD; Label: La Brava

== Awards and nominations ==
=== ARIA Music Awards ===
The ARIA Music Awards is an annual awards ceremony that recognises excellence, innovation, and achievement across all genres of Australian music. They commenced in 1987.

Year	Nominee / work	Award	Result	Ref.
1998	The Jazz Police	Best Jazz Album	Nominated	
