= Chorus (Mildlife album) =

2024 album by Mildlife

Studio album by Mildlife
- Released: 1 March 2024
- Genre: Jazz, pop rock
- Length: 45:20
- Label: Mildlife, PIAS, Heavenly Recordings
- Producer: Mildlife

Mildlife chronology
Live from South Channel Island (2022)	Chorus (2024)

Chorus is the third studio album by Australian psychedelic jazz fusion group, Mildlife. The album was released 1 March 2024 and peaked at number 36 on the ARIA Charts.

In a statement, the group's Jim Rindfleish said "Chorus is about a coming together of disparate elements. Not in some sort of utopian aesthetic where everything works perfectly, but in the natural flow and state of things. It's about cosmic compatibility and chemistry: what makes things work? Not just what makes the band work, but what makes good music, art or love? It's the rhythm of nature."

At the 2024 ARIA Music Awards, it won Best Jazz Album.

== Reception ==
Triple R said "Mildlife's Chorus is an exploration of cosmic groove and rhythmic communion. It weaves infectious '70s psychedelic sounds with elements of Polish jazz, Italo disco, and modern electronic music." adding "The resulting songs are both earthy and cosmic, in tune with the band's interstellar fascinations and the cycles of nature they draw inspiration from."

Iain Ferguson from Everything is Noise said "Mildlife offer an escape from your worries and fears with the smooth, uplifting Chorus.

PBS 106.7FM called it "Mildlife's most optimistic record, serving as a sonic testament to the band's unwavering adoration for the beguiling realms of 70s psychedelic and cosmic sounds."

== Track listing ==
All tracks are written by Mildlife

No.	Title	Length
1.	"Forever"	5:35
2.	"Yourself"	6:23
3.	"Sunrise"	4:06
4.	"Musica"	5:49
5.	"Chorus"	9:10
6.	"Future Life"	4:35
7.	"Return to Centaurus"	9:42
Total length:		45:20

== Charts ==
Chart (2024)	Peak position
Australian Albums (ARIA)	36
UK Album Downloads Chart	27
