= Lush Life (The George Golla Orchestra album) =

Studio album by The George Golla Orchestra
- Released: 1986
- Genre: Jazz
- Label: ABC Music
- Producer: Clen Dennis

Lush Life (subtitled: A Tribute To Duke Ellington & Billy Strayhorn) is a studio album by Australian jazz musician George Golla, credited to The George Golla Orchestra and released in 1986.

At the ARIA Music Awards of 1987 the album won the ARIA Award for Best Jazz Album.

== Track listing ==
1. "Lush Life" - 3:10
2. "Things Ain't What They Used to Be" - 3:18
3. "I Got It Bad (and That Ain't Good)" - 4:05
4. "Don't Get Around Much Anymore" - 4:40
5. "Mood Indigo" - 3:55
6. "Take the "A" Train" - 3:30
7. "Solitude" - 2:40
8. "I'm Beginning to See the Light" - 3:45
9. "I Let a Song Go Out of My Heart" - 3:48
10. "Prelude to a Kiss" - 3:25
11. "Do Nothing till You Hear from Me" - 4:28
12. "Creole Love Call" - 4:18
13. "It Don't Mean a Thing if It Ain't Got That Swing" - 2:58
