= Infinite Desires =

Studio album by Donny Benét
- Released: 29 February 2024
- Studio: Fed Up
- Length: 36:32
- Labels: Donnyland; The Orchard
- Producer: Donny Benét

Donny Benét chronology
Le Piano (2022)	Infinite Desires (2024)	Il Basso (2026)

Singles from Infinite Desires
- 1. "Multiply" Released: 10 November 2023; 2. "American Dream" Released: 19 January 2024; 3. "Forbidden Love" Released: 23 February 2024

Infinite Desires is the sixth studio album by Australian post-disco singer, Donny Benét. It was announced on 10 November 2023, along its lead single and released on 29 February 2024. It is his first on his own label Donnyland Records.

== Reception ==
Lars Brandle from Billboard said "Benét drops funk bombs all over Infinite Desires, a retro journey that takes the listener back to a time when big hair was fine, muscles ruled Hollywood and you wouldn't be seen out without shoulder pads."

== Track listing ==
All tracks are written and performed by Donny Benét.

1. "Multiply" – 4:16
2. "American Dream" – 4:57
3. "Forbidden Love" – 4:51
4. "Hold On Tonight" – 3:52
5. "So Long" – 5:12
6. "Consensual Loving" – 4:10
7. "Go Now" – 4:38
8. "Wait Until It Rains Tomorrow" – 4:36

== Personnel ==
- Donny Benét – production, recording
- William Bowden – mastering
- Jacques Échelle – design
- Burke Reid – mixing, production assistance
- McLean Stephenson – photography
- Neal Sutherland – vocal recording
- Daniel Waples – saxophone

== Charts ==
Chart performance for Infinite Desires
Chart (2024)	Peak position
Australian Albums (ARIA)	46
