= Fire (Mark Simmonds Freeboppers album) =

Studio album by Mark Simmonds Freeboppers
- Released: 1993
- Studio: Electric Avenue Studios
- Label: Birdland Records
- Producer: Kieran Stafford, Mark Simmonds

Fire is a studio album by Australian jazz group, Mark Simmonds Freeboppers. It was released in 1993.

At the ARIA Music Awards of 1995 the album won the ARIA Award for Best Jazz Album.

== Track listing ==
CD 1

1. "The Spotted Dog" - 8:36
2. "On the Road" - 5:41
3. "Afghanistan" - 8:55
4. "29th Street Hop" - 10:00
5. "Underground" - 7:35
6. "Mr Sleeze" - 8:32
7. "The Jazz Waltz" - 8:54

CD 2

1. "Paradise Blues" - 7:25
2. "Virtue" - 8:47
3. "Crossing the Line" - 8:13
4. "Bird-s-hit" - 7:02
5. "One for Hawk" - 7:09
6. "Take Off" - 8:38
7. "Freak Out" - 3:54

== Personnel ==
- Mark Simmonds: Tenor Saxophone
- Scott Tinkler: Trumpet
- Steve Elphick: Double Bass
- Simon Barker: Drums
