= Roseto =

Roseto may refer to:

== Places ==
=== Italy ===
- Roseto Capo Spulico
- Roseto degli Abruzzi
- Roseto Valfortore

=== United States ===
- Roseto, Pennsylvania

== Sports ==
- Roseto Sharks, an Italian professional basketball team from Roseto, Abruzzo, Italy established in 1946 which has used several names all of which include "Roseto"

== See also ==
- Rossetto (disambiguation)
