= Andrew Speight =

American jazz saxophonist (1964–2022)

- Born: 23 March 1964; Sydney, New South Wales, Australia
- Died: 1 December 2022 (aged 58); Burlingame, California, U.S.
- Genres: Jazz
- Instrument: Saxophone

Andrew Speight (23 March 1964 – 1 December 2022) was an Australian-born American jazz saxophonist. His band, the Andrew Speight Quartet, won the 1999 ARIA Award for Best Jazz Album with their self titled album. Speight had previously fronted the jazz quintet Now's the Time.

== Biography ==
Speight was originally from Sydney, Australia, where he was able to perform with touring musicians including Benny Carter and Nat Adderley. In the early 1990s, he moved to Michigan to teach jazz studies programs at Michigan State University, and later at San Francisco State University. He was a part of Wynton Marsalis' band for a BBC TV concert in 1993, and later performed at Jazz at Lincoln Center.

Speight was a sideman on the album Marsalis Music Honors Series: Jimmy Cobb (2006), described by All About Jazz as "highly acclaimed." Jazz critic Thom Jurek noted that "Speight in particular shines" during his solo performances on the album.

At the 2011 Stanford Jazz Festival, he performed a recreation of the Bird with Strings album originally recorded by Charlie Parker. Speight was the co-producer of the Manly Jazz Festival in 2007 and subsequent years.

In March 2020 at the start of the coronavirus pandemic, Speight launched the first of 117 consecutive weekly live sessions streamed to Facebook from bassist Jeff Saxton's residence. As the Live at Five sessions continued, they relocated to Speight's residence in Burlingame, California. The sessions hosted a number of well-regarded guest musicians as well as Speight's students from San Francisco State University. Several sessions were recorded for future release.

Speight was killed in a train accident on 1 December 2022, in Burlingame, California. He was 58.

He is the brother of Peter Speight, a Sydney-based former lawyer.

== Discography ==
=== Albums ===
Title	Details
Andrew Speight Quartet (as Andrew Speight Quartet)	Released: October 1998; Label: ABC Music; Format: CD

== Awards ==
=== ARIA Music Awards ===
The ARIA Music Awards is an annual awards ceremony that recognises excellence, innovation, and achievement across all genres of Australian music. They commenced in 1987.

Year	Nominee / work	Award	Result	Ref.
1999	Andrew Speight Quartet	Best Jazz Album	Won	
