= Cool Dudes =

1980s Australian jazz band

- Origin: Hunter Valley
- Genres: Jazz
- Years active: late 1980s – early 1990s; 2001
- Labels: Sandstock
- Past members: Trevor Furner; Terry Widdowson; Howard Ward; Peter Young; Greg Henshaw; Paul Watters; Milton Saunders; Giles Smith

Cool Dudes were an Australian jazz band from the Hunter Valley in the late 1980s. Their self titled album was nominated for the 1989 ARIA Award for Best Jazz Album. The group split by the mid-1990s. Terry Widowson was a member of the Neville Ure Trio in mid-1999 with Andrew Wallace on double bass and Cary Bennett on drums.

The Cool Dudes re-united in early 2001 for a limited number of shows in that year with the four-piece line-up of Trevor Furner on reeds, Greg Henshaw on vocals and bass guitar, Terry Widowson on keyboards and Peter Young on drums. According to Newcastle's The Post's reporter, "the quartet performs mainstream interpretations of jazz standards... [they] press ahead with a low-key comeback."

== Members ==
- Trevor Furner – saxophone
- Terry Widowson – keyboards
- Howard Ward – bass guitar, vocals
- Peter Young – drums
- Milton Saunders – keyboards
- Paul Watters – guitar
- Greg Henshaw – bass guitar, vocals
- Giles Smith – bass guitar

== Discography ==
=== Albums ===
List of albums, with selected details
| Title | Details |
|---|---|
| Cool Dudes | Released: 1988; Format: LP; Label: Sandstock Music (SSM 033) |
| Honestly, The Cool Dudes (with Su Cruickshank) | Released: 1990; Format: LP; Label: Sandstock Music (SSM 040) |

== Awards and nominations ==
=== ARIA Music Awards ===
The ARIA Music Awards is an annual awards ceremony that recognises excellence, innovation, and achievement across all genres of Australian music. They commenced in 1987.

| Year | Nominee / work | Award | Result | Ref. |
|---|---|---|---|---|
| 1989 | Cool Dudes | Best Jazz Album | Nominated | |
