= Mell-O-Tones =

- Years active: 1998-

Mell-O-Tones is an Australian swing band directed by Phillip Sametz. They play music from 1920s to the 1940s. Their album with the Don Burrows, Non Stop Flight - Great Music Of The Swing Era, was nominated for the 2006 ARIA Award for Best Jazz Album.

== Discography ==
=== Albums ===
List of albums, with selected details
Title	Details
Hollywood Swings - From the Movie Musicals	Released: 2001; Format: CD; Label: ABC Jazz (461 799–2)
Swinging Down Broadway	Released: June 2002; Format: CD; Label: ABC Jazz (472 150–2)
I Dreamed About You, Songs of Love and Longing from World War II	Released: 2003; Format: CD; Label: ABC Jazz (ABC 981 091–5)
Non-Stop Flight: Great Music of the Swing Era (with Don Burrows)	Released: 2005; Format: CD; Label: ABC Jazz (ABC 982 9885)
The Mell-O-Tones Song Book	Released: 2008; Format: CD; Label: ABC Jazz; Note: Compilation of their previous albums
Live at Olympic Hall (with Matt Andersen)	Released: May 2018; Format: CD, Digital; Label: StubbyFingers
Swinging Down Broadway (with Phillip Sametz)	Released: January 2022; Format: CD, Digital; Label: ABC Jazz

== Awards and nominations ==
=== ARIA Music Awards ===
The ARIA Music Awards is an annual awards ceremony that recognises excellence, innovation, and achievement across all genres of Australian music. They commenced in 1987.

Year	Nominee / work	Award	Result	Ref.
2006	Non-Stop Flight: Great Music Of The Swing Era (with Don Burrows)	Best Jazz Album	Nominated	
