= Guy Strazz =

Australian jazz guitarist

- Guy Strazz at his Central Coast studio

Background information
- Also known as: Guy Strazzullo
- Born: Gaetano Strazzullo
- Origin: Sydney, Australia
- Genres: Jazz, Indo-Jazz fusion, Afro-Brazilian jazz, world-jazz, western classical
- Occupations: Guitarist, composer, educator
- Instruments: Acoustic guitar, classical guitar, electric guitar
- Years active: 1982–present
- Website: guystrazz.com

Guy Strazz (born Gaetano Strazzullo, 10 September 1955), also known as Guy Strazzullo, is an Italian-born Australian jazz guitarist, composer, and educator. He won the APRA Music Award for Most Performed Jazz Work in 2000.

== Early life and education ==
In 1982, Strazz graduated with a diploma in jazz studies from the New South Wales Conservatorium of Music. He later undertook postgraduate research into improvisation and composition, completing a Master of Arts (Hons) degree at Western Sydney University in 2003 and a PhD at Macquarie University in 2014.

By 1990, his classical guitar composition "Acacia" was published by the Australian Guitar Journal alongside an article on his work.

== Career ==
In 1984, he joined the ensemble Intersection, led by pianist Roger Frampton, touring the Indian subcontinent with performances at the Jazz Yatra festival. His work in the Sydney post-traditional jazz landscape was documented in 1987 by Oxford University Press.

Strazz subsequently toured from 1989 to 1990 with jazz vocalist Vince Jones. In 1992, he led the trio Australian Creole with bassist Keith Manning and drummer Craig Walters. They recorded the albums Travelling On (1994) and Passion Fruit (1997) through Tall Poppies Records. In 1995, he was profiled by music critic John Shand in the magazine Australasian Jazz & Blues.

The Guy Strazzullo Trio toured Indonesia in November 1997, performing at the Jakarta Jazz Festival and collaborating with musicians Dwiki Dharmawan and Ade Rudiana, alongside conducting workshops at the Farabi Music School. In 1998, ABC Jazz released The Riddle by the trio; the track "Creology" received an APRA nomination in 1999. His follow-up album with the Guy Strazzullo Quartet, Blue Phoenix (1999), won the 2000 Jazz APRA Award for his composition "Mandela".

Following Indian classical music studies with Pt. Ashok Roy, Strazz performed with him at the Sydney Opera House Festival of Asian Music & Dance in 2000. In the same year, he collaborated with Indian slide-guitarist Vishwa Mohan Bhatt as part of the Carnivale Festival in Sydney. In November 2003, he performed with the ensemble Con Spirit Oz, premiering Ross Edwards' Tyalgum Mantras at the Sydney Opera House Studio.

Strazz received an Australia Council fellowship from 2001 to 2003, studying with guitarist Pat Martino in Philadelphia and recording with Mike Stern and Slava Grigoryan on the 2003 album Frangipane, which earned an APRA nomination in 2004. Supported by an Australia Council Music grant, Strazz recorded Calcutta Express in India with santoor player Sandip Chatterjee using a customized 8-string guitar. The album was a finalist for the 2006 US Indie Acoustic Project Award in the category for World Music: Eurasia.

Alongside performing, Strazz authored the "World Music Grooves" regular column series for Australian Guitar Magazine. His subsequent releases include the album Colours (2006), and the duo album 2@1 (2009) with pianist Matt McMahon, which was nominated for an AIR Award. The collaboration behind the album was the subject of a video interview feature by Guitar Heroes. His PhD research produced the Silk Road Concerto and the album Eastern Blues, released on Rufus Records in 2012. In 2018, he formed the Acoustic Wonderland Band, releasing the EP All Blues and Beyond. In 2023, he recorded the collaboration album Afrotonic with drummer David Jones, which released in 2024. The 2012 PhD recording of the Silk Road Concerto was subsequently released in 2025.

== Discography ==
=== Albums ===
Title	Details
Travelling On (as Australian Creole)	Released: 1994; Label: Tall Poppies
Passionfruit (as Guy Strazzullo)	Released: 1997; Label: Tall Poppies
The Riddle (with Guy Strazzullo)	Released: 1998; Label: ABC Jazz
Blue Phoenix (as Guy Strazzullo Quartet)	Released: 1999; Label: ABC Jazz
Frangipani (as Guy Strazz)	Released: 2003; Label: ABC Jazz
Calcutta Express (as Guy Strazz & Sandip Chatterjee)	Released: 2006; Label: Underscore Records
Colours (as Guy Strazz)	Released: 2006; Label: ABC first-Edition
2@1 (with Matt McMahon)	Released: 2008; Label: Birdland Records
Eastern Blues (as Guy Strazz Quartet)	Released: 2012; Label: Rufus Records; Review: The Australian
All Blues and Beyond (as Guy Strazz Acoustic Wonderland Band)	Released: 2018; Label: Independent
Afrotonic (as Guy Strazz & David Jones)	Released: 2023; Label: Independent
Silk Road Concerto (as Guy Strazz)	Released: 2024; Label: Independent

== Awards ==
The APRA Music Awards are presented annually by APRA AMCOS to recognize excellence in contemporary music, honoring songwriters and publishers across the industry.

Year	Nominee / work	Award / Association	Result	Ref.
1999	Creology (as Guy Strazzullo Trio)	Most Performed Jazz Work (APRA)	Nominated	
2000	"Mandela" (as Guy Strazzullo Quartet)	Most Performed Jazz Work (APRA)	Won	
2004	"Mandela" (as Guy Strazzullo)	Most Performed Jazz Work (APRA)	Nominated	
2008	2@1 (with Matt McMahon)	Best Jazz Album of the Year (AIR)	Nominated	

=== International Awards ===
The Indie Acoustic Project Awards (USA) recognize excellence in independent acoustic music across a variety of global categories.

Year	Nominee / work	Category	Result	Ref.
2006	Calcutta Express (with Sandip Chatterjee)	World Music: Eurasia	Finalist	
