= Rossetto =

Rossetto can mean:

People

- Héctor Rossetto - Argentine chess player who became an International Grandmaster in 1960
- Louis Rossetto - American journalist. He is best known as the founder and former publisher of Wired magazine

Food and drinks

- An alternative name used in Italy for the white wine grape Trebbiano
- An alternative name used in Italy for the red wine grape Grignolino

== See also ==
- Roseto (disambiguation)
