= Dave Dallwitz =

Australian painter and jazz musician (1914–2003)

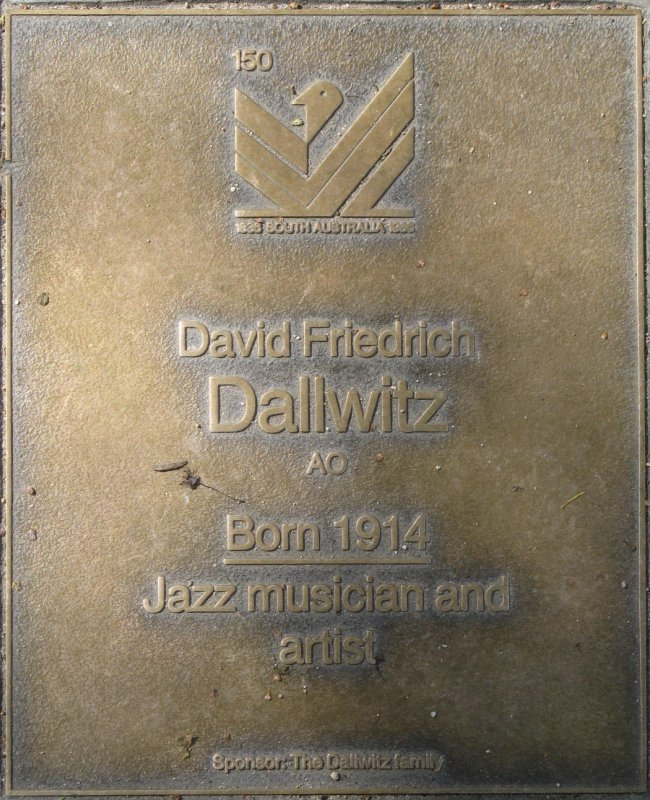
Commemorative plaque on the Jubilee 150 Walkway

David Friedrich Dallwitz AO (25 October 1914 – 24 March 2003) was a South Australian jazz and classical musician, bandleader, composer, painter, and art teacher whose work spanned almost seven decades. He led jazz, Dixieland, and ragtime bands, and performed with classical chamber music groups.

== Biography ==
Dallwitz was born in Freeling, South Australia. He studied violin as a child. After moving with his family to Adelaide in 1930, he developed an aptitude for jazz piano. From 1933 to 1935, he studied concurrently at the South Australian School of Art and the North Adelaide School of Fine Art.

== Music career ==
He led the Southern Jazz Group, a Dixieland band that performed at the first Australian Jazz Convention. He abandoned jazz for a period, during which he studied at the Elder Conservatorium of Music, composing symphonic and chamber music and taking up bassoon and cello. He became involved in composing and arranging music for revues, leading to the formation of the Flinders Street Revue Company, for which he also directed and played piano. He returned to jazz in 1970 and resumed recording shortly after.

He worked with Australian progressive musicians such as John Sangster, Bob Barnard, and Len Barnard. He also led the Dave Dallwitz Ragtime Ensemble.

Dallwitz died on 24 March 2003 in Adelaide, after finishing the art work for his album The Dave Dallwitz Big Band live at Wollongong, December 1984. This album was the result of the band's second appearance at the Australian Jazz Convention in Wollongong in 1984 and was mastered and co-produced by trumpeter Greg Englert, who was lead trumpet for the concert.

== Art career ==
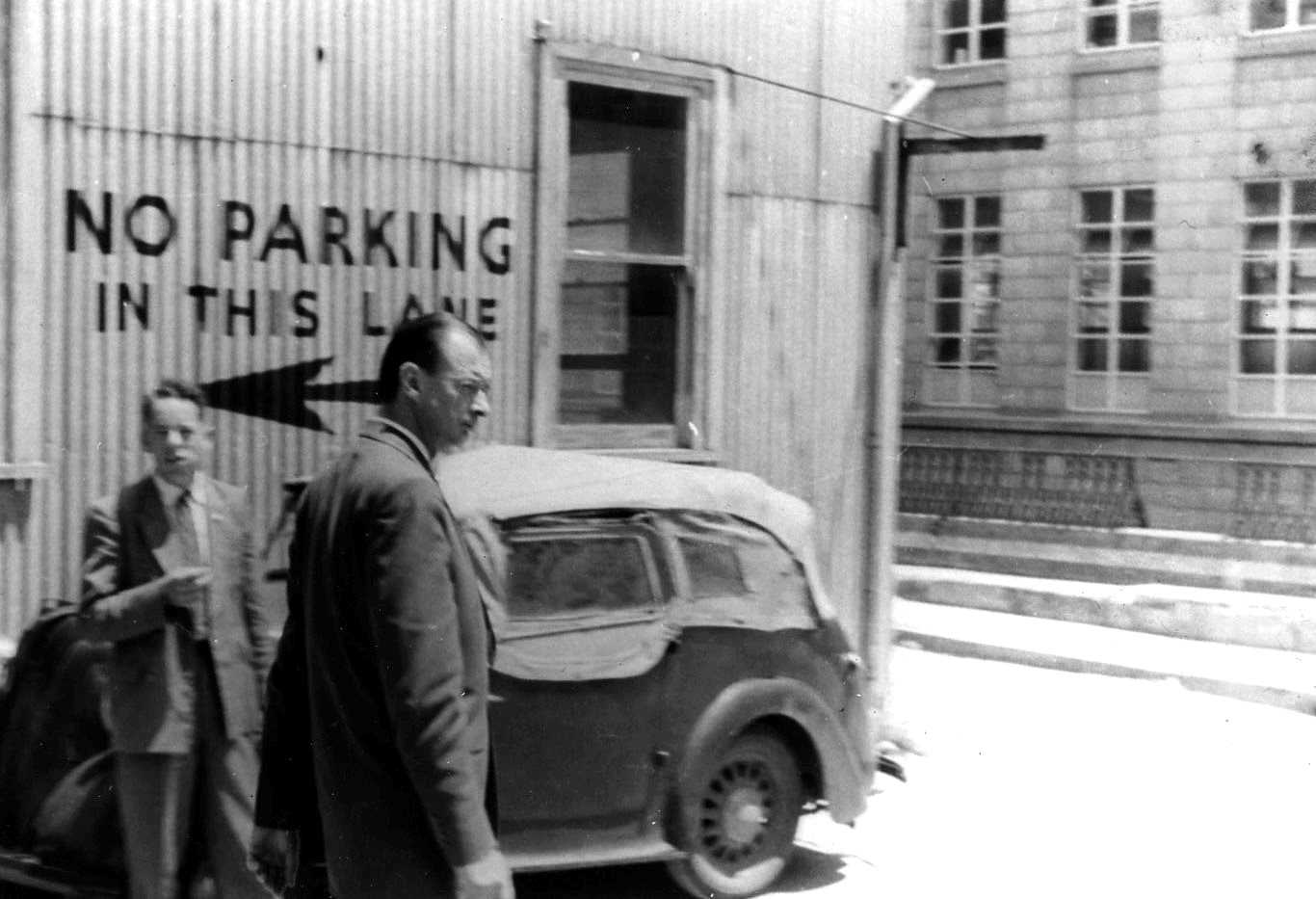
Dave Dallwitz 1959

In 1940, Dallwitz joined the Royal South Australian Society of Arts as an associate member, full membership being the preserve of followers of conservative styles. In July 1942 the associate members held an exhibition in the Society's gallery on North Terrace of modern art, which drew local and interstate interest. He was involved in the formation in 1942 of the South Australian branch of the Contemporary Art Society, which identified with progressive modes of art, becoming its foundation chairman.

Dallwitz taught technical drawing subjects (drafting, dimensioned sketching, lettering) at Thebarton Boys Technical School (known as ‘Thebbie Tech’). He taught at Adelaide Technical High School from around 1954 to 1964, where he introduced painting, drawing and history of art to replace the old technical drawing subjects. He then lectured in Art History and drawing at the School of Art until 1974. In 1974 he quit teaching and turned to painting and printmaking. His range of subjects was extensive (landscapes, portraits, still life) and he presented many one-man exhibitions.

== Personal life ==
Dallwitz married art student Joan Rowe on 14 April 1938. Their home at Seacliff, South Australia, became known as the ‘Jazz House’ and as a gathering place for artists and musicians. They had two children, John (born 3 March 1941) and Julie (born 12 February 1947).

== Awards and honors ==
In 1986 he was appointed an Officer of the Order of Australia for contributions to music, and the same year a plaque bearing his name was installed on North Terrace, Adelaide as part of the Jubilee 150 celebrations. In 1994 he was honoured by a retrospective exhibition at the Art Gallery of South Australia. His work hangs in the Art Gallery of South Australia and the National Gallery of Australia and the University of South Australia.

== Partial discography ==
=== As leader ===
- Melbourne Suite (Swaggie, 1973)
- Ern Malley Suite (Swaggie, 1975)
- Creation Suite: In the Beginning
- Ragtime Fantasy No. 4

=== As composer ===
- Ned Kelly Suite: Dawn over Euroa – Bob Barnard
