= Phase (Mildlife album) =

Studio album by Mildlife
- Released: 2 November 2017
- Length: 39:59
- Label: Research Records
- Producer: Mildlife

Mildlife chronology
Phase (2017)	Automatic (2020)

Phase is the debut studio album by Australian psychedelic jazz fusion group, Mildlife. The album was released 2 November 2017.

At the 2018 Worldwide FM Awards, the album won Best Album. At the Music Victoria Awards of 2018, the album was nominated for Best Soul, Funk, R'n'B and Gospel Album.

== Reception ==
Professional ratings
Review scores
Source	Rating
The Guardian	3/5 stars

Kitty Empire from Rolling Stone Australia said "Mildlife's debut album, Phase, falls just on the right side of the line dividing smug progressive fusions a la the Alan Parsons Project from questing psych-disco-jazz, the kind that wouldn't sound wrong supporting Tame Impala on tour. The most enduring tracks are the calmest, where Mildlife foreground flow and beauty over virtuoso musicianship."

Philip Wilding from Louder Sound said "Mildlife make music that made this writer want to transform his living room into a haven of shagpile carpet, with some sort of seat that looks like a bowl that hangs from the ceiling on a chain. After giving the album a couple of spins, one was even thinking about cultivating an Afro. Listening to Phase can do that to you, with its undulating, cultured synth patterns and loose, jazzy grooves with splashes of psych rock and funk."

Dummy Mag said "A melting pot of musical sensations, the group combine progressive 1970s sounds with electronic krautrock, backed by a mixture of rhythmic funk, house, and dream-pop, to create an addictive atmosphere that's illustrated perfectly by their first single 'The Magnificent Moon'."

== Track listing ==
All tracks are written by Mildlife.

No.	Title	Length
1.	"The Magnificent Moon"	8:52
2.	"Zwango Zop"	4:49
3.	"Im Blau"	7:08
4.	"Phase"	6:19
5.	"Two Horizons"	6:04
6.	"The Gloves Don't Bite"	6:47
Total length:		39:59

== Personnel ==
As per Bandcamp.

=== Mildlife ===
- Kevin McDowell – synthesisers (all tracks), Rhodes (1, 5), vocals (1, 2, 5, 6), electronics (6)
- Adam Halliwell – guitar (all tracks), vocals (2), vocoder (3), flute (3)
- Tomas Shanahan – bass guitar (all tracks)
- James Donald – drum kit (all tracks)

=== Additional personnel ===
- Craig Shanahan – congas (1, 2, 6), güiro (3), shaker (3)

=== Technical ===
- Mildlife – production, engineering
- Jim Rindfleish – engineering
- Steve Schram – mixing
- Joseph Carra – mastering
- Confetti Studio – artwork
- Tom Ross – photography
