= Steven Rossitto =

- Born: 1993 or 1994 (age 30–31)
- Origin: Australia
- Genres: Jazz
- Occupation: Singer

Steven Rossitto is an Australian jazz singer. He was nominated for the 2012 ARIA Award for Best Jazz Album with his album Night & Day.

== Discography ==
=== Albums ===
List of albums, with selected details
Title	Details
Night & Day	Released: August 2012; Format: CD, Digital; Label: ABC Music (3711148)

=== Extended plays ===
List of albums, with selected details
Title	Details
Steven Rossitto	Released: March 2016; Format: CD, Digital; Label: Steven Rossitto (190394123642)

== Awards and nominations ==
=== ARIA Music Awards ===
The ARIA Music Awards is an annual awards ceremony that recognises excellence, innovation, and achievement across all genres of Australian music. They commenced in 1987.

Year	Nominee / work	Award	Result	Ref.
2012	Night & Day	Best Jazz Album	Nominated	
