= Stealing O'Neal =

Australian band

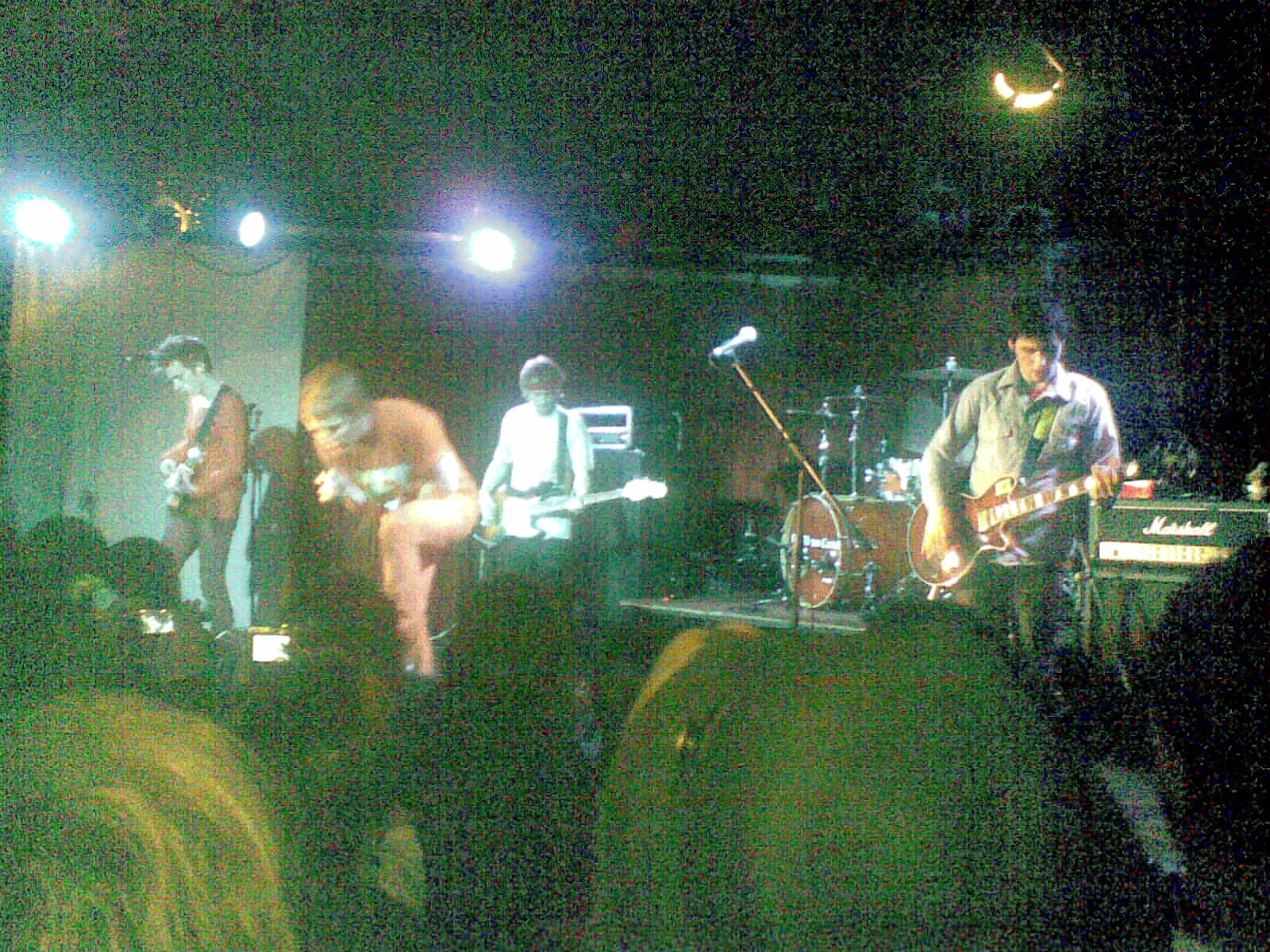
- Stealing O'Neal supporting All Time Low at the Corner Hotel in Melbourne, June 2009

Background information
- Origin: Melbourne, Victoria, Australia
- Genres: Rock; pop rock; pop punk
- Years active: 2004–2011, 2015
- Labels: BNM; Shock; Taperjean
- Past members: James Moro; Chris Scott; Jack Tosi; Tim O'Keefe; Tom Fleming; Ryan D'Sylva
- Website: Official website

Stealing O'Neal (commonly referred to as SO'N) were an Australian pop rock band from Melbourne, formed in 2004. The band comprised vocalist Chris Scott, guitarist and backing vocalist Jack Tosi, bassist Tom Fleming, guitarist Tim O'Keefe and drummer Ryan D'Sylva. They made a name for themselves with live performances alongside well-known Australian acts Something with Numbers, The Hot Lies and The Getaway Plan, as well as international acts New Found Glory, Boys Night Out, All Time Low and The Audition as well as playing as the Melbourne local act at Soundwave 2009.

Stealing O'Neal released two EPs: Spin for Me (2006), which reached No. 53 on the ARIA Singles Chart, and Collidescope (2008), which reached No. 20 on the ARIA Physical Singles Chart, and one studio album: Don't Sleep (2010), before disbanding in September 2011.

== History ==
=== Early years and Spin for Me (2004–2006) ===
The band was formed in Melbourne, Australia, in 2004. Their first demos were self-released in 2006, including the song "Arctic Dancefloor", an acoustic cover of the Arctic Monkeys song "I Bet You Look Good on the Dancefloor", from their album Whatever People Say I Am, That's What I'm Not.

In 2007, the group signed with Melodic Music Management and Sydney-based independent label Taperjean Records to record their debut EP, Spin for Me, later released in April featuring five new tracks. Stealing O'Neal spent five days recording the EP with music engineer Matt Darcy (Angelas Dish), with the record being mixed by Johnothan Burnside (The Sleepy Jackson). The EP gained significant independent success, hitting the Australian Independent Records (AIR) charts at number four and the Australian ARIA Singles Chart at number 56. The reissue nearly a year later peaked at number two on the AIR Charts. Upon release of their first EP, Stealing O'Neal's style was described as "Saves the Day meets Placebo". The band would go on a national tour to promote their debut EP throughout May and June. They performed in South Australia, Victoria, New South Wales, and Queensland.

=== Departure of Moro and Collidescope (2008–2010) ===
Sometime following the release of their debut EP, drummer James Moro left the band for undisclosed reasons. Stealing O'Neal signed to Melbourne Independent label BNM Records in May 2008. The band's second EP was released on 7 June, entitled Collidescope. It was recorded and produced by Luke Gerard-Webb, who is known for work with The Angels, Faker and Kisschasy. Collidescope debuted at number 20 on the ARIA Physical Singles Chart and number 86 on the Singles chart. In July, Stealing O'Neal went on the Friends with Benefits tour. Performing in Brisbane with A Year to Remember, in Melbourne with Capeside, in Sydney with Envy Parade, and in Adelaide with Amber Calling.

On 27 February 2009, Stealing O'Neal were one of two local bands selected to play at the Melbourne leg of the Soundwave festival. In June, they were taken on a national tour with American bands All Time Low and Set Your Goals. In October, Stealing O'Neal supported American band The Ataris on their Australian tour.

Then throughout March 2010, Stealing O'Neal was the supporting band for The Used on their tour to promote their album Artwork. On 24 September, Stealing O'Neal supported The Getaway Plan at their Revival in support of To Write Love on Her Arms.

=== Don't Sleep and disbandment (2010–2015) ===
The band's debut album Don't Sleep was released on 8 October. It was mixed in the UK by Romesh Dodangoda (Funeral for a Friend, Glassjaw, Motörhead). As a promotional release, the band released the only single from the album entitled "Homecoming" for free. Stealing O'Neal later embarked on a headline tour for the release of their album from 15 October. The Don't Sleep tour performed in four locations; Melbourne, Sydney, Brisbane and Adelaide.

The band announced their plan to break-up in September 2011, they then performed a final show on 24 September in Melbourne. Supporting them were Matt and Clint of The Getaway Plan, The Mission In Motion, and GAMEboy.

In February 2015, Stealing O'Neal teased a one-off headlining reunion performance before making an official announcement that they would be returning to their hometown of Melbourne to perform on 2 April at the Plastic Good Friday Eve Party organized by Destroy All Lines. Supporting them were Brighter at Night, The Valley Ends, and Harbours.

== Personnel ==
Past members

- Chris Scott – lead vocals (2004–2011, 2015)
- Jack Tosi – lead guitar, backing vocals, keyboard (2004–2011, 2015)
- Tim O'Keefe – rhythm guitar, backing vocals (2004–2011, 2015)
- Tom Fleming – bass (2004–2011, 2015), backing vocals (2007–2011, 2015)
- Ryan D'Sylva – drums (2007–2011, 2015)
- James Moro – drums (2004–2007)

Timeline

== Discography ==
=== Studio albums ===
| Title | Album details |
|---|---|
| Don't Sleep | Released: 8 October 2010; Label: Shock; Format: CD, digital download, streaming |

=== Extended plays ===
List of extended plays with selected chart positions
| Title | EP details | Peak chart positions |
| Title | EP details | AUS |
|---|---|---|
| Spin for Me | Released: April 2007; Label: Taperjean; Format: CD, digital download | 53 |
| Collidescope | Released: 7 June 2008; Label: BNM; Format: CD, digital download | 86 (Note: Collidescope also peaked at number 20 on the Physical Singles Chart.) |

=== Singles ===
| Title | Year | Album |
|---|---|---|
| "Homecoming" | 2010 | Don't Sleep |

== Awards ==
=== AIR Awards ===
The Australian Independent Record Awards (commonly known informally as AIR Awards) is an annual awards night to recognise, promote and celebrate the success of Australia's Independent Music sector.

| Year | Nominee / work | Award | Result |
|---|---|---|---|
| 2008 | Collidescope | Best Independent Single/EP | Nominated |
