= Mark Simmonds (saxophonist) =

Australian musician

- Born: 1955; Christchurch, New Zealand
- Died: September 2020 (aged 64–65)
- Occupation: Musician
- Instrument: Saxophone
- Years active: 1970s–2000
- Label: Birdland
- Formerly of: Mark Simmonds' Freeboppers

Mark Simmonds (1955 – September 2020) was a New Zealand-Australian jazz tenor saxophonist, composer, and leader of the group The Freeboppers. Born in Christchurch, New Zealand, he moved to Sydney, New South Wales, Australia when he was 10 years old.

== Career ==
Prominent in the Australian jazz scene throughout the 1970s, 80s and 90s, Mark Simmonds also worked in many other musical settings such as soul, funk groups The Dynamic Hepnotics (1985–1986), Jackie Orszaczky's Jump Back Jack, and also contemporary music groups such as Phil Treloar's Feeling to Thought, PipeLine and The Umbrellas. In addition to these, the Australian Rock database lists Simmonds as a member of Drain, Corroboree, Chris Turner Band, Silver Studs, Keys Orchestra, Moonlight, Ol' 55, Bentley's Boogie Band, and Renee Geyer Band. Simmonds led his own groups, mostly under the name of The Freeboppers. In December 1981, Mark Simmonds' Freeboppers played at the All Souls Feast Dance, a music event conceived and produced by Alessio Cavallaro, at the Trades Union Club in Sydney, along with Laughing Clowns, The Makers of the Dead Travel Fast, and improviser, Jon Rose.

Two songs of The Freeboppers were featured on the KMA (Keys Music Association) compilation LP in 1982 entitled March of the Five Limbs. Mark Simmonds' Freeboppers released a full-length double CD entitled 'FIRE' in 1993 on Birdland Records (BL002). The album won an Aria Award for Best Jazz Album in 1995. A song called Kings Cross Drag was included on the 1993 Vox Australis album, Beyond El Rocco : The Ultimate Australian Jazz Soundtrack.

Simmonds' collaborators include Steve Elphick (bass), Phil Treloar (percussion), David Adés (alto sax), Jamie Fielding (keyboards), Greg Sheehan (drums), Miroslav Bukovsky (trumpet), Peter Dehlsen (drums), Louis Burdett (drums), Peter Fine, Daniel Fine (sax), Steve Hunter (bass), Serge Ermöll (piano), Kees Steen (guitar), Rob Gador (bass), Michael Sheridan (guitar), Chris Abrahams (piano), Cleis Pierce (violin), Samila Sithole (percussion), Andrew Gander (drums), Thierry Fossemalle (bass), Scott Tinkler (trumpet), Simon Barker (drums), Azo Bell (guitar), Duncan Archibald (drums), Diane Peters (harp), Bobby Gebert (piano), Mark Shepherd (bass), Will Guthrie (drums), Scott Lambie (drums), Philip Rex (bass), Tony Buck (drums), Elliött Dalgléish (saxophones), Rick Caskey (bass), Charlie Owen (guitar).

In an article from The Sydney Morning Herald 13 May 1987, jazz critic Gail Brennan wrote: "Mark Simmond's Freeboppers devastated the Basement with an unbroken hour-and-a-half orgy of rhythm and fire." The article reviews a double-bill with the Dale Barlow Quintet at Sydney's most renowned jazz venue, The Basement, on 11 May 1987. It goes on to say Mark "led a band that had played in public for a month (at the Piccadilly) and their confidence and cohesion were glorious to hear" and concludes; "It is not often that a reviewer of Australian jazz has no choice but to gush. This was one of those nights."

Mark retired from regular public performance in the early 2000s, but continued to play music with fellow musicians up until his death. His last live performance- a duet with Jeffrey Wegener, took place in Leichhardt, New South Wales, in 2019. Wegener says that Simmonds, on this occasion, "played magnificently".

== Awards ==
=== ARIA Music Awards ===
The ARIA Music Awards is an annual awards ceremony that recognises excellence, innovation, and achievement across all genres of Australian music. They commenced in 1987.

Year	Nominee / work	Award	Result
1995	Fire (as Mark Simmonds Freeboppers)	Best Jazz Album	Won
