= Andrew Robson (musician) =

Andrew Robson is an Australian jazz saxophonist.

Robson is the frontman of the Andrew Robson Trio which also includes double bassist Steve Elphick and drummer Hamish Stuart. Robson was nominated for the 2003 ARIA Award for Best Jazz Album with On. Andrew Robson Trio was nominated for the same award in 2001 with Sunman.

== Discography ==
=== Albums ===
List of albums, with selected details
Title	Details
Scrum (as Andrew Robson Trio)	Released: 1997; Format: CD; Label: Rufus Records (RF031)
Sunman (as Andrew Robson Trio)	Released: 2000; Format: CD; Label: Rufus Records (RF062)
On	Released: 2002; Format: CD; Label: ABC Jazz (ABC 066 634-2)
Bearing the Bell (as Andrew Robson Trio)	Released: 2008; Format: CD
Radiola (as Andrew Robson Trio)	Released: 2008; Format: CD
Songbook (as Andrew Robson Trio)	Released: July 2013; Format: CD
The Child Ballads (as Andrew Robson Trio)	Released: 2016; Format: CD

== Awards and nominations ==
=== ARIA Music Awards ===
The ARIA Music Awards is an annual awards ceremony that recognises excellence, innovation, and achievement across all genres of Australian music. They commenced in 1987.

Year	Nominee / work	Award	Result	Ref.
2001	Sunman	Best Jazz Album	Nominated	
2003	On	Best Jazz Album	Nominated	
