= Matt McMahon =

Matt McMahon may refer to:

- Matt McMahon (basketball) (born 1978), men's college basketball head coach
- Matt McMahon (pianist), Australian jazz pianist and composer
