= Phillip Sametz =

Australian radio broadcaster

Phillip Sametz is an Australian radio broadcaster. He was born in Sydney. Following his first broadcasts on ABC Classic FM and 2MBS-FM in the 1980s, he appeared on all the major ABC radio networks, writing and presenting feature programs, documentaries and interval features on ABC Classic FM, and as a regular guest on the afternoon show on ABC 702 Sydney, on the evening show on ABC 774 Melbourne, and on Radio National's The Music Show. Sametz was the Melbourne Symphony Orchestra's Communications Manager from 2004 until 2013, and presented Classic Breakfast on ABC Classic FM each weekday during 2016–2017. He is also Director and vocalist of Sydney-based swing band the Mell-O-Tones, who perform regularly at the Hayden Orpheum Cinemas in Cremorne, Sydney.

His writing about music appears regularly on ABC Classics albums and in the program books of the Australian symphony orchestras, Opera Australia and the Melbourne Recital Centre. He has also helped mentor aspiring young musicians as part of the MRC's Accelerando program. His book on the history of the Sydney Symphony Orchestra, Play On!, was published by ABC Books to mark the Orchestra's 60th anniversary in 1992; he also contributed to the historical volume published to celebrate Musica Viva's 50th anniversary in 1995.

In 2016 and 2017, Sametz hosted live concert presentations by the Melbourne Youth Orchestra, the Tasmanian Symphony Orchestra, the Queensland Youth Orchestra and the Melbourne Symphony Orchestra. He was also MC for the 2016 edition of the Four Winds Easter Festival in Bermagui, NSW.

== Discography ==
Sametz and the Mell-O-Tones have produced the following albums. Non-Stop Flight includes guest soloist Don Burrows:

- Hollywood Swings. (ISBN / Catalogue Number: 461 799-2 ) Released 2001
- Swinging Down Broadway. (ISBN / Catalogue Number: 472 150-2 ) Released 2002
- I Dreamed About You. (ISBN / Catalogue Number: 981 091-5) Released 2003
- Non-Stop Flight. (ISBN / Catalogue Number: 982 9885) Released 2005
