= Jamie Oehlers =

Australian jazz saxophonist

- Origin: Australia
- Genre: Jazz
- Occupation: Saxophonist

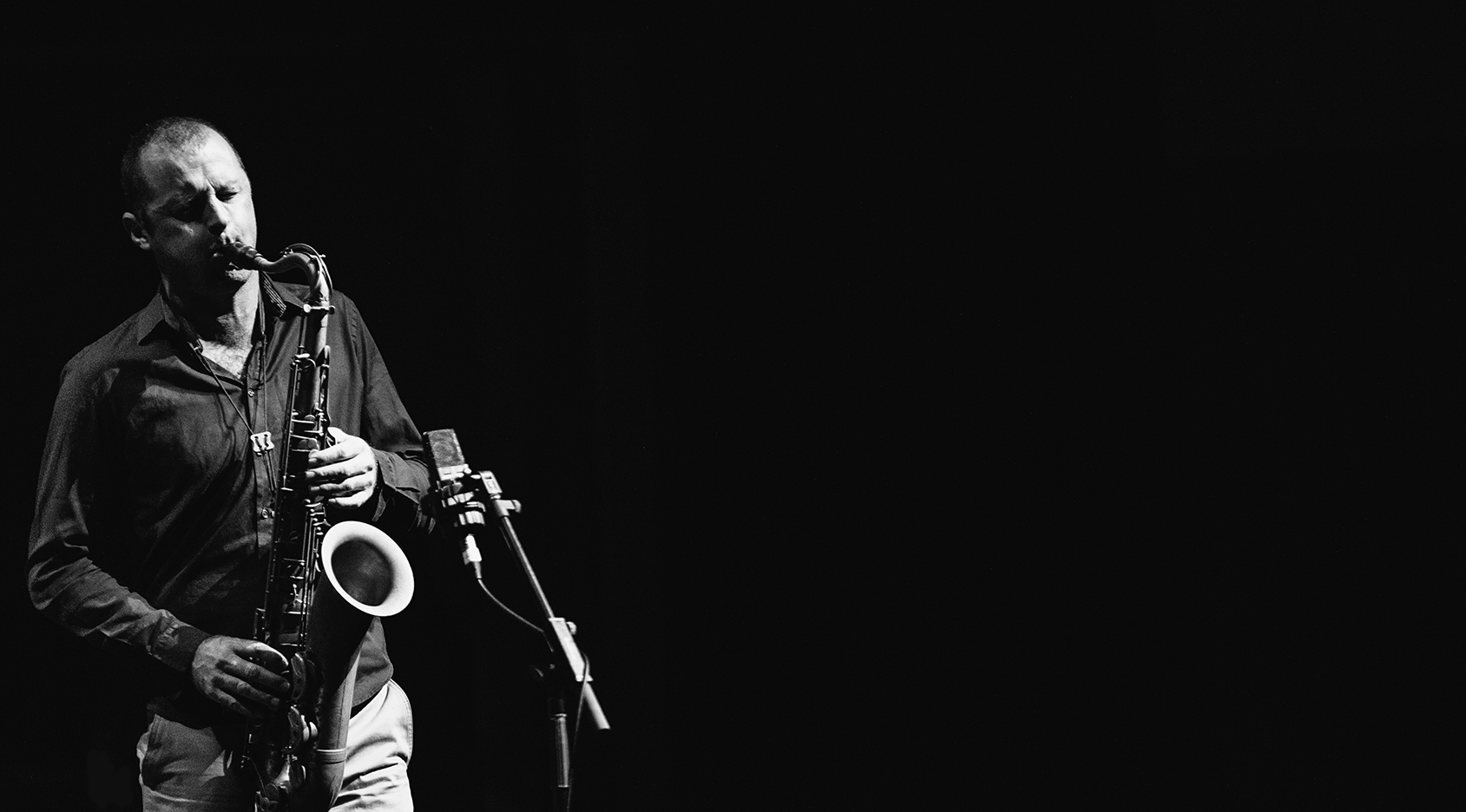
Jamie Oehlers Performing

Jamie Oehlers is an Australian jazz saxophonist. Winner of the World Saxophone competition in 2005, Jamie is recognised as one of Australia's leading jazz artists, performing at festivals and clubs around the globe. He was nominated for ARIA Awards for Best Jazz Album in 1999 (Jamie Oehlers - Strut), in 2005 (Oehlers & Keevers - Grace) and in 2008 (Oehlers, Grabowsky & Beck - Lost And Found) and has won multiple Australia Jazz Bell Awards for Best Jazz Release, as well as Australian Jazz Artist of the Year. Jamie is also the Head of Jazz Studies at the prestigious Western Australian Academy of Performing Arts.

== Discography ==
=== Albums ===
Title	Details
Strut	Released: 1999; Label: Sunset Records; Format: CD
Velocity	Released: 2000; Label: Newmarket Records (NEW3076.2); Format: CD
Grace (with Sam Keeves)	Released: April 2004; Label: Jamie Oehlers; Format: DD
The Assemblers	Released: 2004; Label: Jazzhead (HEAD045); Format: CD
You R Here Session One (as Jamie Oehlers Double Drummer Group)	Released: 2006; Label: Jazzhead (HEAD074); Format: CD, DD
You R Here Session Two (as Jamie Oehlers Double Drummer Group)	Released: 2006; Label: Jazzhead (HEAD075); Format: CD, DD
Lost and Found (as Oehlers, Grabowsky, Beck)	Released: 2008; Label: Jazzhead (HEAD091); Format: CD, DD
On a Clear Day (with Paul Grabowsky)	Released: July 2010; Label: Jazzhead (HEAD129); Format: CD, DD
The Differences (with Gian Slater)	Released: 2012; Label: Gian Slater, Jamie Oehlers; Format: CD, DD
Smoke and Mirrors (as Jamie Oehlers Quartet featuring Ari Hoenig)	Released: 2012; Label: Jazzhead (HEAD121); Format: CD, DD
Paper Tight (with Stephen Magnusson and Ben Vanderwal)	Released: 2014; Label: Assemblers Records (ASSEMBLERS001); Format: CD, DD
Burden of Memory	Released: August 2015; Label: Assemblers Records; Format: DD
Innocent Dreamer (with Tal Cohen)	Released: September 2016; Label: Assemblers Records (ASSEMBLERS003); Format: CD, DD
Night Music	Released: May 2019; Label: Assemblers Records (ASSEMBLERS0004); Format: CD, DD

== Awards and nominations ==
=== AIR Awards ===
The Australian Independent Record Awards (commonly known informally as AIR Awards) is an annual awards night to recognise, promote and celebrate the success of Australia's Independent Music sector.

Year	Nominee / work	Award	Result
2008	Lost and Found (as Oehlers Grabowsky Keevers)	Best Independent Jazz Album	Nominated
2010	On a Clear Day	Best Independent Jazz Album	Nominated

=== ARIA Music Awards ===
The ARIA Music Awards is an annual awards ceremony that recognises excellence, innovation, and achievement across all genres of Australian music. Oehlers has been nominated for three awards.

Year	Nominee / work	Award	Result
1999	Strut	Best Jazz Album	Nominated
2005	Grace (as Oehlers & Keevers)	Best Jazz Album	Nominated
2008	Lost and Found (as Oehlers, Grabowsky & Beck)	Best Jazz Album	Nominated

=== Australian Jazz Bell Awards ===
The Australian Jazz Bell Awards, (also known as the Bell Awards or The Bells), are annual music awards for the jazz music genre in Australia. They commenced in 2003.

Year	Nominee / work	Award	Result
2006	The Assemblers by Jamie Oehlers	Best Australian Contemporary Jazz Album	Won
2007	Jamie Oehlers	Australian Jazz Artist of the Year	Won
2007	You R Here - Session 2 – Jamie Oehlers Double Drummer Group	Best Australian Contemporary Jazz Album	Won
2009	Lost and Found (as Oehlers, Grabowsky, Beck)	Best Australian Contemporary Jazz Album	Won

- Note wins only
