= Bob Barnard (musician) =

Australian jazz musician (1933–2022)

Bob Barnard AM
- Birth name: Robert Graeme Barnard
- Born: 24 November 1933; Melbourne, Victoria, Australia
- Died: 7 May 2022 (aged 88)
- Genres: Jazz
- Occupations: Musician
- Instruments: Trumpet; cornet
- Formerly of: Graeme Bell Allstars
- Spouses: Patricia Greig; Danielle Boas (1993–2022)

Robert Graeme Barnard AM (24 November 1933 – 7 May 2022) was an Australian trumpet and cornet player. He was nominated at the ARIA Music Awards of 1996 for Best Jazz Album for Live at the Sydney Opera House, which was recorded with the Australian Jazz Allstars.

In the 1990 Australia Day Honours Barnard was made a Member of the Order of Australia (AM) for "service to music, particularly jazz."

== Biography ==
Robert Graeme Barnard was born on 24 November 1933 in Melbourne. Barnard's parents had formed a dance band in the 1920s, his mother Kath (died April 1981) was the bandleader and pianist, his father Jim Barnard (died November 1983) was on saxophone, drums and banjo. His older brother, Len (1929–2005), joined them on drums at age 11. Barnard took trumpet lessons from age 11 and played clarinet in a local brass band before he joined the family band, in 1947.

Len, on drums, formed his own group, Len's South City Stompers (later Len Barnard's Famous Jazz Band) in 1948, which Barnard joined on trumpet. Their first recording was in 1949 – on his 16th birthday. In June of the following year they began a weekly broadcast on radio station 3KZ as Len Barnard's Dixieland Jazz Band, with the line-up of Barnard on trumpet, Len on piano, Tich Bray on clarinet, Graham Fitzgibbon on banjo, Bill Frederlckson on bass, Frank Traynor on trombone and Fred Whitworth on drums. They performed at the Australian jazz festival in Melbourne over four days in late December 1952. They performed on Australian Broadcasting Commission (ABC)'s radio station, 3AR from March 1953.

Barnard played with Len's group until August 1955, when their touring ended after being "cheated of their takings" and stranded in Tumut. In 1957 Barnard relocated to Sydney to perform with Ray Price Trio, alongside Price on guitar and banjo and Dick Hughes on piano, before returning to Melbourne. In February 1958 he joined Graeme Bell's band (later called Graeme Bell and His All-Stars) on trumpet with Len on drums, Bell on piano and Lou Silberseisein on bass for an Australian tour. Barnard worked for Brashs from 1958 to 1962, while performing after business hours.

He returned to Sydney in 1962 and in September, as a member of Graeme Bell and His All-Stars, he appeared on Trad Pad, a TV special programme.

== Awards ==
=== ARIA Music Awards ===
The ARIA Music Awards is an annual awards ceremony that recognises excellence, innovation, and achievement across all genres of Australian music. It commenced in 1987.

| Year | Nominee / work | Award | Result |
|---|---|---|---|
| 1996 | Live at the Sydney Opera House | Best Jazz Album | Nominated |

=== Mo Awards ===
The Australian Entertainment Mo Awards (commonly known informally as the Mo Awards), were annual Australian entertainment industry awards. They recognise achievements in live entertainment in Australia from 1975 to 2016. Bob Barnard won two awards in that time.

| Year | Nominee / work | Award | Result (wins only) |
|---|---|---|---|
| 1992 | Bob Barnard | Jazz Performer of the Year | Won |
| 1996 | Bob Barnard | Jazz Instrumental Performer of the Year | Won |
