= Travel (album) =

Studio album by The Necks
- Released: 24 February 2023
- Studio: Studios 301, Alexandria, Australia
- Genre: Jazz
- Length: 76:59
- Label: Fish of Milk, Northern Spy
- Producer: The Necks

The Necks chronology
Three (2020)	Travel (2023)

Travel is a 2023 studio album by Australian jazz trio The Necks. It has received positive reviews by critics.

== Reception ==
According to the review aggregator Metacritic, Travel received "universal acclaim" based on a weighted average score of 91 out of 100 from 5 critic scores. Editors at AllMusic rated this album 4 out of 5 stars, with critic Thom Jurek writing that the music is "impeccably recorded and mixed by longtime collaborator Tim Whitten" and the album "blossoms with new ideas, fluid spontaneity, and fresh ideas", with a recommendation to new listeners to start here in the band's discography. The site also included this on their list of the best jazz albums of 2023. Online retailer Bandcamp included this among the best jazz albums of the year, with critic Dave Sumner writing that it "captures a facet of [the band's] growth by recording extended sections of studio improvisations that mark the start of each day, a glimpse into the process that has led to so many of past albums". In The Big Takeover, Michael Toland summed up his review, "every song on Travel is intriguing and compelling, as this band’s music always is, and it’s heartening to see that putting the tunes in bite-sized nuggets (even if the bites are Tyrannosaurus-sized) doesn’t make it any less so". Kevin Whitlock of Jazzwise gave this album 5 out of 5 stars, calling this the band's best since Unfold in 2017 and "each track constitues a musical journey" with an uncertain endpoint. A short review in The New Yorker by Michaelangelo Matos praised the musicianship of the bandmembers and stated that this work "showcases their singular style as effectively as any of their past work, with four songs of around twenty minutes apiece". Richard Williams of Uncut rated Travel 4.5 out of 5 stars, noting elements of blues music and part of the band's multi-decade evolution. The Wire's 2023 Rewind: Releases of the Year 1–50 included this as #46.

== Track listing ==
All songs written by Chris Abrahams, Tony Buck, and Lloyd Swanton.

1. "Signal" – 20:51
2. "Forming" – 20:14
3. "Imprinting" – 17:14
4. "Bloodstream" – 18:40

== Personnel ==
The Necks

- Chris Abrahams – piano, Hammond organ, production
- Tony Buck – drums, percussion, electric guitar, production
- Lloyd Swanton – bass guitar, double bass

Additional personnel

- Douglas Henderson – audio mastering at micro-moose-berlin, Berlin, Germany
- Traianos Pakioufakis – photography, design
- Tim Whitten – recording, mixing at Forbes Street Studios, Woolloomooloo, Australia

== See also ==
- 2023 in jazz
- List of 2023 albums
