= APRA Music Awards of 1999 =

Annual Australian music awards

- Date: May 1999
- Location: The Forum Theatre; Melbourne Australia

The Australasian Performing Right Association Awards of 1999 (generally known as APRA Awards) are a series of awards held in May 1999. The APRA Music Awards were presented by Australasian Performing Right Association (APRA) and the Australasian Mechanical Copyright Owners Society (AMCOS). Only one classical music award was available in 1999: Most Performed Contemporary Classical Composition. APRA provided awards for "Best Television Theme", and "Best Film Score" in 1999. APRA and AMCOS also sponsored the Australian Guild of Screen Composers (AGSC), which provided their own awards ceremony, from 1996 to 2000, with categories for film and TV composers.

== Awards ==
Nominees and winners with results indicated on the right.

=== APRA Music Awards ===
Song of the Year
Title	Artist	Writer	Result
"Addicted to Bass"	Josh Abrahams (w.p.a. Puretone), Amiel Daemion	Abrahams, Daemion	Nominated
"Buses and Trains"	Bachelor Girl	James Roche	Won
"Cry"	The Mavis's	Matthew Thomas (w.p.a. Matt Doll), Barry Palmer, Rebecca Thomas (w.p.a. Beki Thomas, Beki Colada), Nicholas Gill, Joshua Alexander, Andrea Vendy	Nominated
"The Day You Come"	Powderfinger	Jon Coghill, John Collins, Ian Haug, Darren Middleton, Bernard Fanning	Nominated
"Heavy Heart"	You Am I	Tim Rogers	Nominated
Songwriters of the Year
Writer			Result
Paul Kelly			Won
Ted Albert Award for Outstanding Services to Australian Music
Name			Result
Slim Dusty			Won
Most Performed Australian Work
Title	Artist	Writer	Result
"Buses and Trains"	Bachelor Girl	James Roche	Nominated
"Cry"	The Mavis's	Matthew Thomas (w.p.a. Matt Doll), Barry Palmer, Rebecca Thomas (w.p.a. Beki Thomas, Beki Colada), Nicholas Gill, Joshua Alexander, Andrea Vendy	Won
"Lonely"	Merril Bainbridge	Bainbridge, Owen Bolwell	Nominated
"Love Is Alive"	Kate Ceberano	Mark Goldenberg, Ceberano	Nominated
"Now I Can Dance"	Tina Arena	Arena, David Tyson	Nominated
Most Performed Australian Work Overseas
Title	Artist	Writer	Result
"Truly Madly Deeply"	Savage Garden	Darren Hayes, Daniel Jones	Won
Most Performed Children's Work
Title	Artist	Writer	Result
"Captain Feathersword Fell Asleep On His Pirate Ship (Quack Quack)"	The Wiggles	Murray Cook, Jeffrey Fatt, Anthony Field, Gregory Page	Won
"Fhir An Bhata"	Riley Lee, Sean O'Boyle with Queensland Symphony Orchestra	Riley Lee, Sean O'Boyle	Nominated
"Fun With Humphrey"	Humphrey	Peter Douglas, Robert Pippan	Nominated
"Ooga Chuga (In The Jungle)"	The Hooley Dooleys	David Butts / Antoine Demarest / Bruce Thorburn	Nominated
"We're Dancing With Wags the Dog"	The Wiggles	Murray Cook, Jeffrey Fatt, Anthony Field, Gregory Page	Nominated
Most Performed Country Work
Title	Artist	Writer	Result
"Biggest Disappointment"	Troy Cassar-Daley	Joy McKean	Nominated
"Goondiwindi Moon"	Lee Kernaghan	Kernaghan, James Blundell, Garth Porter	Nominated
"Hat Town"	Lee Kernaghan	Colin Buchanan, Kernaghan, Porter	Won
"Last Man Standing"	Adam Brand	Brand, Clive Young	Nominated
"Your Own Sweet Time"	Shanley Del	Shanley Del Gregory	Nominated
Most Performed Foreign Work
Title	Artist	Writer	Result
"Big Mistake"	Natalie Imbruglia	Martin Sandberg	Nominated
"High"	Lighthouse Family	Paul Tucker, Emmanuel Baiyewu	Nominated
"My Father's Eyes"	Eric Clapton	Clapton	Nominated
"Never Ever"	All Saints	Shaznay Lewis, Esmail Jazayeri, Sean Mather	Nominated
"You're Still the One"	Shania Twain	Twain, Robert "Mutt" Lange	Won
Most Performed Jazz Work
Title	Artist	Writer	Result
"Cool Beans"	Bob Bertles	Bertles	Nominated
Creology	Australian Creole	Guy Strazzullo	Nominated
"Moshoeshoe the First"	Clarion Fracture Zone	Tony Gorman	Nominated
Subtlety of Time	Graeme Lyall	Tony Gould	Nominated
"Unheard"	The Necks	Christopher Abrahams, Lloyd Swanton, Anthony Buck	Won
Most Performed Contemporary Classical Composition
Title	Composer	Performer	Result
Earth Cry	Peter Sculthorpe	Goldner String Quartet	Nominated
Enyato II	Ross Edwards	Patricia Pollet (viola)	Nominated
Fandango	Ann Carr-Boyd	The Sydney Mandolins	Nominated
Laikan	Nigel Westlake	Australia Ensemble	Won
Selfish Giant	Graeme Koehne	Queensland Philharmonic Orchestra	Nominated
Best Film Score
Title		Composer	Result
Babe: Pig in the City		Nigel Westlake	Nominated
Elizabeth		David Hirschfelder	Won
A Little Bit of Soul – Tasmanian Symphony Orchestra		Westlake	Nominated
The Sound of One Hand Clapping		Cezary Skubiszewski	Nominated
The Truman Show		Burkhard Dallwitz	Nominated
Best Television Theme
Title		Composer	Result
All Saints		Colin Bayley, Kevin Bayley, Murray Burns	Nominated
Crocadoo: Season 2		Clive Harrison	Nominated
Moby Dick		Christopher Gordon	Won
SeaChange		Richard Pleasance	Nominated
Search for Treasure Island		Peter Dasent	Nominated

== See also ==
- Music of Australia
