= Mindset (album) =

Studio album by The Necks
- Released: October 2011
- Recorded: 2011
- Studio: Megaphon Studios, St Peters, Australia
- Genre: Improvised music
- Length: 43:24
- Label: Fish of Milk / ReR
- Producer: The Necks

The Necks chronology
Silverwater (2009)	Mindset (2011)	Open (2013)

Professional ratings
Aggregate scores
Source	Rating
Metacritic	78/100
Review scores
Source	Rating
The Guardian	4/5 stars
Mojo	4/5 stars

Mindset is the sixteenth album by Australian improvised music trio The Necks (eleventh excluding live and soundtrack albums), first released on the Fish of Milk label in 2011 in Australia and on the ReR label internationally. Their first album to be released on vinyl, Mindset consists of two contrasting pieces titled "Rum Jungle" and "Daylights", the former propulsive and jangling and the latter more ambient in nature.

== Reception ==
Metacritic, which assigns a normalised rating out of 100 to reviews from mainstream critics, awarded the album a score of 78, based on 4 reviews which is considered as "Generally favorable".

On BBC Music Bill Tilland noted "Expectations are set up only to be subverted on The Necks’ latest long-player" and observed "Over the years, The Necks have gradually introduced more electronic enhancements into their repertoire of sounds. On "Rum Jungle", the first of the two typically long pieces here (both are over 20 minutes), these elements create a thick, clotted atmosphere which is enveloping but sometimes almost claustrophobic... The second piece, "Daylights", uses the same basic strategy but to radically different effect".

The Guardian's John Fordham commented on the album's minimalism writing "Australian improv trio the Necks have been making something out of very little for 16 albums. This one features just two 21-minute tracks of pulsing grooves over which tiny shifts of fragmentary melody and textural detail occur... Considering so little happens, you find yourself inexplicably drawn in".

Several critics noted that the duration of the pieces were much more concise in comparison with other Necks albums. In Uncut John Mulvey said "By normal Necks standards, Mindset is a masterpiece of brevity. Instead of containing the usual solitary epic, there are two 21-minute pieces – “Rum Jungle” and “Daylights” – designed to sit on either side of an LP: quaintly, this is their first actual vinyl record in a 25-year career". The Independent's Andy Gill stated "Mindset is short by Necks standards – just two tracks of 22 minutes each – but it is typically involving. It may not have the soothing, immensely satisfying manner of their classic Drive By, but the trio have found other ways to chase their muse".

== Track listing ==
All compositions by The Necks

1. "Rum Jungle" - 21:48
2. "Daylights" - 21:36

== Personnel ==
- Chris Abrahams — piano, organ
- Lloyd Swanton — bass
- Tony Buck — drums, guitar
