= Next (The Necks album) =

Studio album by The Necks
- Released: 1990
- Genre: Improvised music
- Length: 73:20
- Label: Spiral Scratch

The Necks chronology
Sex (1989)	Next (1990)	Aquatic (1994)

Next is the second album by Australian improvised music trio, The Necks, originally released on the Spiral Scratch label in 1990 and later re-released on Fish of Milk. The album differs from most of the trio's releases in that it features 6 tracks, rather than a lone track.

== Reception ==
The Sydney Morning Herald reviewer described it as "Sublime. Six pieces, all of them beautifully played and perfectly controlled".

== Track listing ==
All compositions by The Necks

1. "Garl's" – 7:19
2. "Nice Policeman Nasty Policeman" – 4:54
3. "Pele" – 28:31
4. "Next" – 9:49
5. "Jazz Cancer" – 6:12
6. "The World at War" – 16:35

== Personnel ==
- Chris Abrahams – piano
- Lloyd Swanton – bass
- Tony Buck – drums
- Dave Brewer – guitar (track 2)
- Michel Rose – pedal steel guitar (track 4)
- Timothy Hopkins – alto saxophone, tenor saxophone (track 6)
- Mike Bukovsky – trumpet (track 6)
