= Aquatic (album) =

Studio album by The Necks
- Released: 1994
- Recorded: 1994
- Genre: Improvised music
- Length: 53:08
- Label: Fish of Milk

The Necks chronology
| Next (1990) | Aquatic (1994) | Silent Night (1996) |

Professional ratings
Review scores
| Source | Rating |
|---|---|
| AllMusic | 2/5 stars |

Aquatic is the third album by Australian improvised music trio The Necks released on the Fish of Milk label in 1994 and reissued on the Carpet Bomb label in the US in 1999. The album features two tracks, both titled "Aquatic", performed by Chris Abrahams, Lloyd Swanton and Tony Buck with the addition of Stevie Wishart playing hurdy-gurdy on the second.

== Reception ==
The Wire review described the album as "Real splendour...a hugely mature album, a rare spark of brilliance...a marvel".

== Track listing ==
All compositions produced & written by The Necks.

1. "Aquatic I" - 27:38
2. "Aquatic II" - 25:30

== Personnel ==
- Chris Abrahams – piano, hammond organ
- Lloyd Swanton – bass
- Tony Buck – drums
- Stevie Wishart – hurdy-gurdy (track 2)
