= Open (The Necks album) =

Studio album by The Necks
- Released: 2013
- Recorded: 2013
- Genre: Improvised music
- Length: 68:05
- Label: Fish of Milk

The Necks chronology
Mindset (2011)	Open (2013)	Vertigo (2015)

Professional ratings
Aggregate scores
Source	Rating
Metacritic	79/100
Review scores
Source	Rating
Mojo	4/5 stars
Spin	8/10
Tiny Mix Tapes	3.5/5 stars

Open is the seventeenth album by Australian improvised music trio The Necks (twelfth excluding live and soundtrack albums), first released on the Fish of Milk label in 2013 in Australia and on the ReR label internationally.

Open is a return to the hour-long ambient improvisation of earlier albums which made The Necks famous.

== Track listing ==
1. "Open" - 68:05

All compositions by the Necks

== Personnel ==
- Chris Abrahams — piano, keyboards
- Lloyd Swanton — bass
- Tony Buck — drums, percussion
