= Sex (The Necks album) =

Studio album by The Necks
- Released: 1989
- Recorded: 1989
- Genre: Improvised music
- Length: 56:08
- Label: Spiral Scratch

The Necks chronology
Sex (1989)	Next (1990)

Professional ratings
Review scores
Source	Rating
AllMusic	4/5 stars

Sex is the debut album of improvised music trio, The Necks, originally released on the Spiral Scratch label and later rereleased on Fish of Milk and Private Music in the US. The album features a single track of just under an hour in length performed by Chris Abrahams, Lloyd Swanton and Tony Buck improvising over a two-bar motif. On this album the band overdubbed the instrumentation of piano, bass and drums in a dual take creating a "hypnotic repetitive piece".

The album is also an early example of the CD format being used to expand the length of recorded performances with one reviewer noting that "time limitations and format restrictions of cassettes, vinyl, and the obtuse eight-track would have meant that their work could only be experienced live".

Excerpts from Sex have been used as the theme music on Dan Bodah's Airborne Event show on the WFMU freeform radio station.

== Track listing ==
1. "Sex" (Abrahams, Buck, Swanton) – 56:07

== Personnel ==
- Chris Abrahams – piano
- Lloyd Swanton – double bass
- Tony Buck – drums
