= Silverwater (album) =

Studio album by The Necks
- Released: October 23, 2009
- Recorded: 2009
- Genre: Improvised music
- Length: 67:15
- Label: Fish of Milk

The Necks chronology
Townsville (2007)	Silverwater (2009)	Mindset (2011)

Professional ratings
Review scores
Source	Rating
AllMusic	4/5 stars
Uncut	positive
The Guardian	5/5 stars

Silverwater is the fifteenth album by Australian improvised music trio The Necks (their tenth excluding live and soundtrack albums), first released on the Fish of Milk label in 2009 in Australia and on the ReR label internationally. The album features a single track, titled "Silverwater", performed by Chris Abrahams, Lloyd Swanton and Tony Buck.

== Reception ==
One reviewer stated "There's an overall mood of passiveness to Silverwater that stands in direct contrast to the more aggressive Chemist. This is The Necks at their most reflective, utilising their key tools of minimalism and repetition to create a gently trance-inducing piece of music. Though occasional bursts of intensity serve to stave off monotony, Silverwater remains a largely subdued affair. That it's so utterly engaging, and so amenable to repeat listens is testament to the undeniable skill of the musicians involved".

== Track listing ==
1. "Silverwater" (The Necks) – 67:15

== Personnel ==
- Chris Abrahams – piano, organ
- Tony Buck – drums, guitar
- Lloyd Swanton – double bass
