= Wanderlust (jazz band) =

Australian contemporary jazz band

- Origin: Sydney, New South Wales, Australia
- Genres: Jazz
- Years active: 1991–2022
- Label: Rufus
- Past members: Adam Armstrong; Miroslav Bukovsky; James Greening; Fabian Hevia; Carl Orr; Alister Spence; Jeremy Sawkins; Brendan Clark; John Mackey

Wanderlust were an Australian contemporary jazz band founded by trumpeter Miroslav Bukovsky, which formed in 1991 with Adam Armstrong (bass), James Greening (trombone), Fabian Hevia (drums, percussion), Carl Orr (guitar) and Alister Spence (piano, keyboards). On 3 Oct 1992 they played at the Manly Jazz Festival at Park Royal Hotel. An audio cassette in NSW Jazz Archive collection [per estate of late Harold Denning] is held by the NSW Jazz Archive Society; leader Neil Cairns, June 2013.

At the ARIA Music Awards of 1994 Bukovsky's album, Wanderlust (1993), won the Award for Best Jazz Album. The group have released four albums: Border Crossing (1995), Song and Dance (1999), Full Bronte (2002) and When in Rome (live album, 2008). The latter album had been recorded at Villa Celimontana, Rome in July 2004. The ensemble with the line-up of Bukovsky (trumpet, flugelhorn), Spence (piano), Greening (trombone), Hevia (drums) and Jeremy Sawkins (guitar) were joined by John Mackey (saxophone) and Brendan Clarke (bass) to perform their 30th Anniversary show at Street One, Canberra, in February 2022.

== Members ==
- Adam Armstrong – acoustic bass, electric bass (1991–2012)
- Miroslav Bukovsky – trumpet, flugelhorn, percussion (1991–2022)
- James Greening – trombone, didjeridu (1991–2012)
- Fabian Hevia – drums, percussion (1991–2022)
- Carl Orr – guitars (1991–1995)
- Alister Spence – piano, keyboards (1991–2022)
- Jeremy Sawkins – electric guitar, acoustic guitar (1999–2022)
- Brendan Clark – bass guitar
- John Mackey – saxophone
