= Athenaeum, Homebush, Quay & Raab =

Live album by The Necks
- Released: 2002
- Recorded: January 31, 1999–March 30, 2001
- Genre: Improvised music
- Length: 195:16
- Label: Fish of Milk

The Necks chronology
| Aether (2002) | Athenaeum, Homebush, Quay & Raab (2002) | Photosynthetic (2003) |

Professional ratings
Review scores
| Source | Rating |
|---|---|
| Allmusic | 4.5/5 stars |

Athenaeum, Homebush, Quay & Raab is the ninth album and second live album by Australian improvised music trio The Necks first released on the Fish of Milk label in 2002 as a 4-CD set. The album features 4 live performances by Chris Abrahams, Lloyd Swanton and Tony Buck recorded in Melbourne, Sydney and Raab. The album was nominated for the ARIA Music Awards Best Jazz album in 2003.

== Track listing ==
- CD One:
1. "Athenaeum" - 49:05
- CD Two:
1. "Homebush" - 43:02
- CD Three:
1. "Quay" - 53:44
- CD Four:
1. "Raab" - 49:25

All compositions by The Necks

  - Recorded on 20 January 2001 at the Athenaeum Theatre, Melbourne (CD One), 26 January 2001 at the Southee Complex, Sydney (CD Two), 31 January 1999 at the Basement, Sydney (CD Three), and 30 March 2001 at Musikschule Raab, Austria (CD Four)

== Personnel ==
- Chris Abrahams — piano
- Lloyd Swanton — bass
- Tony Buck — drums
