= Carl Orr =

Australian jazz guitarist and composer

- Born: Carl Grant Orr
- Genres: Jazz; rock; funk; fusion; soul
- Occupation: Musician
- Instruments: guitars; keyboard pads
- Years active: 1980–present
- Labels: RooArt Jazz; Spiral Scratch; Rufus
- Formerly of: Wanderlust
- Website: carlorr.com

Carl Grant Orr is an Australian jazz guitarist and composer. He has been based in London since the 1990s. Orr earned a nomination for the 1992 ARIA Award for Best Jazz Album for Seeking Spirit (1991).

In 1991 he was a member of Australian contemporary jazz band, Wanderlust, alongside Miroslav Bukovsky on trumpet, James Greening on trombone, Alister Spence on piano and keyboards, Adam Armstrong on bass guitar and Fabian Hevia on drums and percussion. Orr has recorded or performed with fellow jazz artists Billy Cobham, George Duke, Bennie Maupin, Eric Bibb, Ernie Watts, Nigel Kennedy, Eric Krasno, T. M. Stevens, Randy Brecker, Gary Husband, Ettienne M'Bappe, Marcus Miller, Mike Stern, Larry Coryell, Ric Fierabracci and Don Grusin. He has also performed with pop musicians Lulu, Anastacia, Doug Parkinson and Marcia Hines. In 2017 Orr was inducted into the South Australian Music Hall of Fame in Adelaide, Australia. In 2018 he played guitar for the UK tour of Sting's "The Last Ship".

== Discography ==
=== Albums ===
List of albums, with selected details
Title	Details
Carl Orr	Released: 1990; Format: LP, cassette, CD; Label: RooArt Jazz (846309-2)
Seeking Spirit	Released: 1991; Format: Cassette, CD; Label: RooArt Jazz (848790-2)
Mean It	Released: 1993; Format: CD; Label: Spiral Scratch (0016)
Blue Thing	Released: 1995; Format: CD; Label: Rufus Records (RF015 )
Absolute Freedom	Released: 2004; Format: CD; Label: Carl Orr (KR 01)
Deep Down	Released: 2006; Format: CD; Label: Carl Orr
Emergence	Released: 2009; Format: CD; Label: Carl Orr
Forbearance	Released: 2014; Format: CD; Label: Carl Orr
Somewhere Else	Released: 2019; Format: CD; Label: Carl Orr

== Awards and nominations ==
=== ARIA Music Awards ===
The ARIA Music Awards is an annual awards ceremony that recognises excellence, innovation, and achievement across all genres of Australian music. They commenced in 1987.

Year	Nominee / work	Award	Result	Ref.
1992	Seeking Spirit	Best Jazz Album	Nominated	
