= Hanging Gardens (The Necks album) =

Studio album by the Necks
- Released: 1999
- Recorded: January 1997
- Genres: Improvised music, Avant-garde jazz
- Length: 60:30
- Label: Fish of Milk

The Necks chronology
The Boys (1998)	Hanging Gardens (1999)	Aether (2001)

Professional ratings
Review scores
Source	Rating
AllMusic	4/5 stars

Hanging Gardens is the seventh album by Australian improvised music trio the Necks (their fifth excluding live and soundtrack albums). It was first released on the Fish of Milk label in 1999 and the ReR label internationally. The album features the single, hour-long eponymous track, improvised by the trio.

== Reception ==
The Guardian review called the album "mesmerising, grandiose music from one of the best bands on the planet."

== Track listing ==
1. "Hanging Gardens" – 60:30

== Personnel ==
- Chris Abrahams – piano, electric piano
- Lloyd Swanton – bass
- Tony Buck – drums
