= The Boys (The Necks album) =

Soundtrack album by The Necks
- Released: 1998
- Recorded: September, 1997–March, 1998
- Genre: Improvised music
- Label: Wild Sound/MDS

The Necks chronology
Piano Bass Drums (1998)	The Boys (1998)	Hanging Gardens (1999)

Professional ratings
Review scores
Source	Rating
Allmusic	4/5 stars

The Boys is the sixth album and first soundtrack album by Australian improvised music trio The Necks originally released on the Wild Sound/MDS label in 1998 and later rereleased on Fish of Milk. The album features music recorded for the Australian motion picture The Boys (1998).

At the ARIA Music Awards of 1998 the soundtrack was nominated for Best Original Soundtrack, Cast or Show Album.

== Reception ==
In All About Jazz critic Simon Calle wrote that "The album would make a good start for those who want to get into these Australians' music, because it's made of smaller doses of the trio's traditional work."

On Nov 4 2026 the album was inducted into the Australian National Songbook by the National Film and Sound Archive .

== Track listing ==
All compositions by The Necks.

1. "The Boys I" - 4:28
2. "He Led Them into the World" - 10:21
3. "Headlights" - 10:11
4. "The Boys II" - 3:15
5. "The Sleep of Champions" - 6:33
6. "Fife and Drum" - 10:22
7. "The Boys III" - 3:43

== Personnel ==
- Chris Abrahams – piano
- Lloyd Swanton – bass
- Tony Buck – drums
