= Body (The Necks album) =

Studio album by The Necks
- Released: 14 August 2018
- Recorded: 2018
- Studio: Music Feeds Studio, St Peters, Australia
- Genre: Improvised music
- Length: 56:38
- Label: Fish of Milk FOM00018; Northern Spy NS 104
- Producer: The Necks

The Necks chronology
Unfold (2017)	Body (2018)	Three (2020)

Body is the twentieth album by Australian improvised music trio The Necks (fifteenth excluding live and soundtrack albums), first released on the Fish of Milk label in 2018 in Australia and on the Northern Spy label in the US.

== Reception ==
Professional ratings
Aggregate scores
Source	Rating
Metacritic	84/100
Review scores
Source	Rating
Pitchfork	8.0/10
Tiny Mix Tapes	4/5 stars
Allmusic	4/5 stars

Metacritic, which assigns a normalised rating out of 100 to reviews from mainstream critics, awarded the album a score of 84, based on 9 reviews which is considered as "Universal acclaim".

Pitchfork's Grayson Haver Currin called the album "engrossing and overwhelming" and noted "for the first time, the trio indulges its rock’n’roll instincts, resulting in one of the most powerful albums in the band’s catalog ... Body feels newly reflective of our space and time, a stark and jarring statement about the precipice of modern life. This is as high as the Necks have ever taken us and, as such, as low as they’ve ever left us".

In JazzTimes Mike Shanley noted "it comes as a bit of a surprise that Body, the Australian trio’s 20th album, begins with the band in the midst of a groove ... Unlike any jazz group, they sound closer to indie-rock bands such as Yo La Tengo or Stereolab, which have been known to sustain energy for extended periods while playing drones like this ... it’s hard to walk away from the music until it’s done".

Tiny Mix Tapes' Jazz Scott called it "enthralling" Rolling Stone critic Christopher R. Weingarten wrote that the album "swerves from their 30-year career of gorgeous ambient washes and fragile improv interplay, instead opting for muscle and hypnosis. This nearly 57-minute piece is held together by drummer Tony Buck’s right arm, which taps out ride-cymbal eighth notes while the band ebbs and flows, builds and collapses, churns and soars. This album is really Buck’s show, his overdubbed percussion accents clanking like a Rube Goldberg machine ... Body doesn’t have the telekinetic bond of the Necks’ famed live show, or the gorgeous ambience of recent albums like Vertigo and Untold [sic], but it brings these veterans into a different space".

Thom Jurek reviewed the album for Allmusic explaining "This is a single hourlong work with four distinct sections, performed in unhurried articulation and elucidation as a unit -- no one solos, all the time... The Necks move incrementally forward in their quest for the musical unknown on Body; it displays all their creative strengths in a single typically engrossing work".

Uncut selected it as number 50 on their Best New Albums of 2018 list.

== Track listing ==
Composed by Chris Abrahams, Tony Buck and Lloyd Swanton

1. "Body" - 56:38

== Personnel ==
- Chris Abrahams – piano, organ
- Lloyd Swanton – bass
- Tony Buck – drums, guitar
