= Photosynthetic (album) =

Live album by The Necks
- Released: 2003
- Recorded: 29 March 2002
- Genre: Improvised music
- Length: 42:22
- Label: Long Arms
- Producer: Nick Dmitriev

The Necks chronology
Athenaeum, Homebush, Quay & Raab (2002)	Photosynthetic (2003)	Drive By (2003)

Photosynthetic is the tenth album and third live album by Australian improvised music trio The Necks released on the Russian Long Arms label in 2003. The album features a single track, titled "Photosynthetic", performed by Chris Abrahams, Lloyd Swanton and Tony Buck recorded live at DOM Cultural Center, Moscow on 29 March 2002.

== Track listing ==
1. "Photosynthetic" - 42:22

All compositions by The Necks
- Recorded live at DOM Cultural Center on 29 March 2002

== Personnel ==
- Chris Abrahams — piano
- Lloyd Swanton — bass
- Tony Buck — drums
