= Three (The Necks album) =

Studio album by The Necks
- Released: 27 March 2020
- Recorded: 2019
- Studio: Studios 301, Alexandria, Australia
- Genre: Improvised music
- Length: 65:07
- Label: Fish of Milk (AUS); FOM00019; Northern Spy (US); NS126; ReR Megacorp (UK); RER NECKS 14
- Producer: The Necks

The Necks chronology
Body (2018)	Three (2020)	Travel (2023)

Three is the twenty-first studio album by Australian improvised music trio The Necks released in 2020.

== Reception ==
Professional ratings
Aggregate scores
Source	Rating
Metacritic	81/100
Review scores
Source	Rating
AllMusic	4/5 stars
Pitchfork	7.2/10
Spectrum Culture	3.25/5

Metacritic, which assigns a normalised rating out of 100 to reviews from mainstream critics, awarded the album a score of 81, based on 8 reviews which is considered as "Universal acclaim".

Pitchfork's Colin Joyce called the album "slow, winding, and meditative" noting it was "composed almost entirely of piano, bass, and drums, and builds outwards from minimal meanderings to overgrown thickets of instrumentation". Thom Jurek on AllMusic stated, "Three offers a nearly dazzling palette of sonic and musical possibility in its gathered and arranged sounds, skillful overdubs, and improvisational acumen, that are performed with unusual directness". In The Quietus Johnny Lamb concluded "It really is outstanding work on all fronts. Each track here has a distinct and complementary topography. Places to explore, spend time in, and marvel at. The Necks remain at the top of their game". JazzTimes reviewer Morgan Enos said "it proves that after tilling the same patch of creative terrain for their entire career, the Necks can still manage a late-period streak of excellence".

== Track listing ==
Composed by Chris Abrahams, Tony Buck and Lloyd Swanton

1. "Bloom" – 21:18
2. "Lovelock" – 22:48
3. "Further" – 21:01

== Personnel ==
- Chris Abrahams – piano
- Lloyd Swanton – bass
- Tony Buck – drums
