= The Catholics =

Australian jazz ensemble

- Origin: Sydney, New South Wales, Australia
- Genres: Jazz
- Years active: 1991 -

The Catholics are an Australian jazz ensemble led by Lloyd Swanton on acoustic and electric bass guitar, percussion and piano (ex-Dynamic Hepnotics). Other long-term members include Sandy Evans on tambourine, tenor and soprano saxophones, and James Greening on trombone. They have been nominated for ARIA Awards for Best Jazz Album in 1994 (The Catholics), 1997 (Life on Earth) and 2000 (Barefoot). Swanton is also a member of a jazz trio, the Necks; Evans was also in Ten Part Invention and has released solo material.

== Members ==
- Dave Brewer – electric and acoustic guitar, drums, güiro
- Sandy Evans – tenor and soprano saxophone, tambourine
- Waldo Fabian – electric bass guitar, percussion
- James Greening – trombone
- Sammila Sithole – congas, bongos, timbales
- Lloyd Swanton – acoustic and electric bass guitar, percussion, piano, shaker, tambourine
- Toby Hall – drums, surdo, timbales
- Michael Rose – pedal steel guitar, shaker, dobro, mandolin
- Fabian Hevia – percussion
- Gary Daley – accordion
- Hamish Stuart – drums
- Jonathan Pease – guitar
- Bruce Reid – steel and lap steel guitar

== Discography ==
Title	Details
The Catholics	Released: 1992; Label: Spiral Scratch (0011); Format: CD
Simple	Released: 1994; Label: Rufus Records (RF009); Format: CD
Life on Earth	Released: 1997; Label: Rufus Records (RF022); Format: CD
Barefoot	Released: 1999; Label: Rufus Records (RF052); Format: CD
Choice	Released: 2000; Label: Rufus Records (RF082); Format: CD; Note: Compilation album
Gondala	Released: 2006; Label: Bugle Records (BUG006); Format: CD
Village	Released: 2007; Label: Bugle Records (BUG007); Format: CD
Inter Vivos	Released: 2009; Label: Bugle Records; Format: 2× CD (BUG008); Note: live album
Yonder	Released: 2013; Label: Bugle Records (BUG009); Format: CD

== Awards and nominations ==
=== ARIA Awards ===
The ARIA Music Awards are presented annually since 1987 by the Australian Recording Industry Association (ARIA).

Year	Nominee / work	Award	Result
1994	The Catholics	Best Jazz Album	Nominated
1997	Life On Earth	Best Jazz Album	Nominated
2000	Barefoot	Best Jazz Album	Nominated

=== Mo Awards ===
The Australian Entertainment Mo Awards (commonly known informally as the Mo Awards), were annual Australian entertainment industry awards. They recognise achievements in live entertainment in Australia from 1975 to 2016. They won one award in that time.

Year	Nominee / work	Award	Result (wins only)
1994	The Catholics	Jazz Group of the Year	Won
