= Piano Bass Drums =

Live album by The Necks
- Released: 1998
- Recorded: September 25, 1996
- Venue: The Basement, Sydney, Australia
- Genre: Improvised music
- Length: 53:24
- Label: Fish of Milk

The Necks chronology
Silent Night (1996)	Piano Bass Drums (1998)	The Boys (1998)

Professional ratings
Review scores
Source	Rating
Allmusic	4/5 stars

Piano Bass Drums is the fifth album and first live album by Australian improvised music trio The Necks released on the Fish of Milk label in 1998. The album features a single track titled "Unheard", performed by Chris Abrahams, Lloyd Swanton and Tony Buck recorded in concert at The Basement in Sydney, Australia.

== Reception ==
The album was nominated for Jazz album of the Year in the 1998 ABC Classic FM awards. At the APRA Music Awards of 1999 "Unheard" won Most Performed Jazz Work.

== Track listing ==
All compositions by The Necks

1. "Unheard" - 53:24

== Personnel ==
- Chris Abrahams — piano
- Lloyd Swanton — bass
- Tony Buck — drums
