= Silent Night (album) =

Studio album by The Necks
- Released: 1996
- Recorded: September 3–10, 1995
- Genre: Improvised music
- Length: 117:20
- Label: Fish of Milk

The Necks chronology
Aquatic (1994)	Silent Night (1996)	Piano Bass Drums (1998)

Professional ratings
Review scores
Source	Rating
AllMusic	2.5/5 stars

Silent Night is the fourth album by Australian improvised music trio The Necks released on the Fish of Milk label in 1996 as a double CD. The album features two tracks, titled "Black" and "White", performed by Chris Abrahams, Lloyd Swanton and Tony Buck.

== Reception ==
The Australian Rolling Stone review of the album stated "The Necks create mood music of the highest calibre. Compelling and beautiful music that repays repeated listening".

== Track listing ==
- CD One:
1. "Black" - 63:29
- CD Two
1. "White" - 53:51

All compositions by The Necks

== Personnel ==
- Chris Abrahams — piano, organ
- Lloyd Swanton — bass
- Tony Buck — drums, sampler
