= Vertigo (The Necks album) =

Studio album by The Necks
- Released: October 30, 2015
- Recorded: 2015
- Studios: Studios 301, Sydney, Australia
- Genre: Improvised music
- Length: 43:57
- Labels: Fish of Milk FOM00017; Northern Spy NS 067; ReR Megacorp RER NECKS 11/12
- Producer: The Necks

The Necks chronology
| Open (2013) | Vertigo (2015) | Unfold (2017) |

Vertigo is the eighteenth album by Australian improvised music trio The Necks (thirteenth excluding live and soundtrack albums), first released on the Fish of Milk label in 2015 in Australia, on ReR Megacorp in Europe, and on the Northern Spy label in the US.

== Reception ==
Professional ratings
Aggregate scores
| Source | Rating |
|---|---|
| Metacritic | 79/100 |
Review scores
| Source | Rating |
| Pitchfork | 7.7/10 |
| Tiny Mix Tapes | 4/5 stars |
| Allmusic | 4/5 stars |

Metacritic, which assigns a normalised rating out of 100 to reviews from mainstream critics, awarded the album a score of 79, based on 7 reviews which is considered as "Generally favorable".

Pitchfork's Grayson Haver Currin said the album "often finds the trio at their finest, delighting in their instrumental ideas like they’re dancing" and stated "Though the Necks occasionally slip into predictability across this session, Vertigo epitomizes their career-long unpredictability, or their ability to start at one point and arrive somewhere entirely unexpected. Vertigo is a minor Necks record, destined to stand forever in the shadow of the 2013 opus Open. But, after a quarter century, the trio’s explorations still sound as ecstatic as they do limitless. That, at least, is another minor miracle".

In JazzTimes Mike Shanley noted "Vertigo, presents a streamlined performance by the trio, since it fades out after 43 minutes. At the same time, they use the shorter length to toy with their usual minimalist approach".

Tiny Mix Tapes' Simon Chandler observed "Vertigo somehow manages to absorb for its entire running time. ... the beauty of Vertigo is that they take her nowhere. For all their passages through sustained hums, tinkling waves, jittery guitars, and unfathomable bass, their only destinations are yet more points of departure"

Thom Jurek reviewed the album for Allmusic explaining "Vertigo is a dark, brooding, sometimes dissonant -- and occasionally explosive -- outing. The 43-minute work is informally split into movement-like halves, though its sense of fluidity is constant, no matter what arises in the proceedings -- and there is plenty. Vertigo's guidepost is a single drone that runs throughout, allowing the musicians a centering device for their various rounds of improvisation and interplay".

Spin reviewer Colin Joyce commented that "There’s anxiety and ecstasy in equal measure across the single 44-minute track, piano parts that repeat and intersect with the heartbeat throbbing basslines the cicada roars of cymbal rolls. These are the parts that should, in theory, coalesce into shapes and patterns that feel familiar, but the Necks are true trance soul rebels, dizzy abstractionists bent on meditative delirium — the sort of frazzled centered headspace you settle into after sitting and thinking for far too long. It’s even freer than free jazz, equally likely to open your mind or make you totally disassociate".

Paste's Dave Cantor wrote "It shimmers and drones, and it never seems to end. Necks’ latest outing, Vertigo, posits that a 40-plus minute track can still seem lean, despite an array of the composition’s sections unloosing stuff as unrelated as sci-fi whirring and a batch of key-plunking that sounds like it might emanate from underwater".

== Track listing ==
Composed by Chris Abrahams, Tony Buck and Lloyd Swanton

1. "Vertigo" - 43:57

== Personnel ==
- Chris Abrahams – piano, organ
- Lloyd Swanton – bass
- Tony Buck – drums, percussion
