= Aether (album) =

Studio album by The Necks
- Released: 2001
- Recorded: 2000
- Genre: Improvised music
- Length: 63:49
- Label: Fish of Milk

The Necks chronology
Hanging Gardens (1999)	Aether (2001)	Athenaeum, Homebush, Quay & Raab (2002)

Professional ratings
Review scores
Source	Rating
AllMusic	4.5/5 stars

Aether is the eighth album by Australian improvised music trio The Necks (their sixth excluding live and soundtrack albums). It was first released on the Fish of Milk label in 2001 and later on the ReR label internationally. The album features a single hour-long track, titled "Aether", performed by Chris Abrahams, Lloyd Swanton and Tony Buck.

== Reception ==
Allmusic reviewer François Couture stated "Aether is simply their best release, a wonderful album that breathes at its own pace. The trick is the same as usual: start on something and play for an hour applying only gradual changes. What is different this time is the tempo -- very, very slow -- and the attitude" calling it "their most mature, captivating album. Strongly recommended.".

BBC Music's Peter Marsh said "Aether is a totally immersive experience. Though they're playing with just a single chord, subtle nuances, additions and subtractions tease out new beauties within it throughout the piece. By the end, it's possible to believe that it's the only chord that ever existed, and any other music sounds hopelessly verbose. Aether's 64 minutes pass by with the ease of seconds but each are as elemental as the phases of the moon. Brilliant".

On The Quietus Nick Southall called it "their ruminative, ambient masterpiece, as minimal and repetitive as Basinski's Disintegration Loops but somehow more alive, unburdened by the weight of association. It starts with tremulous reverberation, which gives way to chiming percussion and meandering, somnolent piano".

In 2012, the album was added to the National Film and Sound Archive's Sounds of Australia registry, becoming the first recording from the 21st century to be listed.

== Track listing ==
All compositions by The Necks.

1. "Aether" – 63:49

== Personnel ==
- Chris Abrahams – piano
- Lloyd Swanton – bass
- Tony Buck – drums
