= Vazesh =

Australian jazz trio

- Origin: Sydney, Australia
- Genre: Jazz
- Members: Hamed Sadeghi; Jeremy Rose; Lloyd Swanton

Vazesh is an Australian improvising jazz trio made up of Hamed Sadeghi, Jeremy Rose and Lloyd Swanton. Their album, The Sacred Key, was nominated for the 2021 ARIA Music Award for Best Jazz Album.

== Members ==
- Hamed Sadeghi - tar
- Jeremy Rose - bass clarinet, soprano and tenor saxophones
- Lloyd Swanton - double bass

== Discography ==
- The Sacred Key (2021) - Earshift Music / The Planet Company
