= Mosquito/See Through =

Studio album by The Necks
- Released: 2004
- Recorded: 2004
- Genre: Improvised music
- Length: 123:30
- Label: Fish of Milk

The Necks chronology
Drive By (2003)	Mosquito/See Through (2004)	Chemist (2005)

Professional ratings
Review scores
Source	Rating
All About Jazz	(very favorable) review by Chris May
All About Jazz	(favorable) review by John Kelman
Tiny Mix Tapes	review by Amneziak
The Independent	review by Andy Gill

Mosquito/See Through is the twelfth album by Australian improvised music trio The Necks (their eighth excluding live and soundtrack albums), first released as a 2-CD set on the Fish of Milk label in 2004 and later on the ReR label internationally. The album features two hour-long tracks, titled "Mosquito" and "See Through", performed by Chris Abrahams, Lloyd Swanton and Tony Buck.

== Reception ==
The Wire review rated the album "Among the Necks recordings you actually would go back to rescue from a house fire".

== Track listing ==
All compositions by Chris Abrahams, Tony Buck and Lloyd Swanton

Disc one

1. "Mosquito" – 61:43

Disc two

1. "See Through" – 61:47

== Personnel ==
- Chris Abrahams – piano
- Lloyd Swanton – bass
- Tony Buck – drums
