= Townsville (album) =

Live album by The Necks
- Released: October 1, 2007
- Recorded: February 15, 2007
- Venue: Riverway Arts Centre, Thuringowa, Australia
- Genre: Improvised music
- Length: 53:40
- Label: Fish of Milk
- Producer: The Necks

The Necks chronology
Chemist (2006)	Townsville (2007)	Silverwater (2009)

Professional ratings
Review scores
Source	Rating
Allmusic	3.5/5 stars

Townsville is the fourteenth album and fourth live album by Australian improvised music trio The Necks first released on the Fish of Milk label in 2007 and on the ReR label internationally. The album a single track, titled "Townsville", performed by Chris Abrahams, Lloyd Swanton and Tony Buck recorded live at the Riverway Arts Centre in Thuringowa, Northern Queensland.

== Reception ==
One reviewer describes Townsville as "Blended from a beguiling mix of minimalism and trance music with just a pinch of jazz improvisation, their performance relies for its success on fixing the audience's attention on the tiny changes in rhythm, the odd little hints of melody, the almost imperceptible dynamic variations that creep into their music from time to time."

== Track listing ==
All compositions by Chris Abrahams, Tony Buck and Lloyd Swanton

1. "Townsville" - 53:40

== Personnel ==
- Chris Abrahams — piano
- Lloyd Swanton — bass
- Tony Buck — drums
