= Townsville (disambiguation) =

Townsville is a tropical city in Northern Queensland, Australia.

Townsville may also refer to:

== Places ==
- City of Townsville, a local government area in northern Queensland, Australia
- Electoral district of Townsville, a Queensland State Government electoral district in Townsville, Australia
- Townsville City, Queensland, the central business district and suburb of Townsville
- Townsville, North Carolina

== Other ==
- HMAS Townsville (FCPB 205), a Fremantle-class patrol boat launched in 1981
- HMAS Townsville (J 205), a Bathurst-class corvette that entered service in 1941
- Port of Townsville, the biggest shipping port in Northern Queensland
- Townsville (album), live album by The Necks
- Townsville, USA, the fictional setting of the animated TV series The Powerpuff Girls

== See also ==
- Townville (disambiguation)
