= Unfold (The Necks album) =

Studio album by The Necks
- Released: February 10, 2017
- Recorded: 2017
- Studio: Studios 301, Alexandria, Australia
- Genre: Improvised music
- Length: 74:40
- Label: Ideologic Organ SOMA025
- Producer: The Necks

The Necks chronology
Vertigo (2015)	Unfold (2017)	Body (2018)

Unfold is the nineteenth album by Australian improvised music trio The Necks (fourteenth excluding live and soundtrack albums), first released on the Ideologic Organ label in 2017 as a double LP and download.

== Reception ==
Professional ratings
Aggregate scores
Source	Rating
Metacritic	79/100
Review scores
Source	Rating
Pitchfork	8.0/10
Tiny Mix Tapes	4/5 stars
Exclaim!	7/10

Metacritic, which assigns a normalised rating out of 100 to reviews from mainstream critics, awarded the album a score of 79, based on 8 reviews which is considered as "Generally favourable".

Pitchfork's Grayson Haver Currin called the album "the result of a band that’s always tested supposedly solid borders—between jazz and rock, between acoustic and electric, between composition and improvisation" and noted "For this double LP, the Necks devote each of four sides to one improvisation. With runtimes between 15 and 22 minutes, they’ve chopped the typical Necks tune into thirds or quarters. What’s more, there’s no intended sequence for these sides, meaning you could start with the hectic, gamelan-like rumble of “Timepiece” or end there, a move that makes the entire experience feel like a ceaseless fever dream. It’s a surprisingly indeterminate decision for a group whose output has always felt, no matter how improvisational it was, meticulous, even hermetic. Since the mid-’90s, the Necks’ records have invariably offered micromanaged adventure; with Unfold, they let you shape your own tale".

In The Quietus Joseph Burnett noted "Unfold displays The Necks at their jazziest and most experimental, almost paradoxically given that they have less room to experiment on four shorter pieces than on the long single ones they’ve accustomed us to. As ever with the Australians, the musicianship is never short of wondrous, and they’ve used the new format to take their music into esoteric and mysterious realms. Not just are the results musically brilliant, they resonate with an emotional force that is too often absent in this sort of music".

Tiny Mix Tapes' Max L. Feldman called it "a challenging but eerily beautiful free-improv record doubling up as a critique of the album-form" Daniel Sylvester reviewed the album for Exclaim! explaining "The Necks don't exactly break new ground with Unfold, but it's refreshing nonetheless to see that they're also not regressing — a small miracle for any band 30 years into their career".

The album was named by Rolling Stone as one of the top 20 avant albums of 2017.

== Track listing ==
Composed by Chris Abrahams, Tony Buck and Lloyd Swanton

1. "Rise" – 15:34
2. "Overhear" – 16:18
3. "Blue Mountain" – 21:00
4. "Timepiece" – 21:48

== Personnel ==
- Chris Abrahams – piano
- Lloyd Swanton – bass
- Tony Buck – drums
