= Clarion Fracture Zone =

Clarion Fracture Zone may refer to:

- Clarion Fracture Zone (band), a jazz ensemble from Australia
- Clarion fracture zone (geology), a geological feature in the Clarion–Clipperton zone
