= Benders =

Australian jazz band

The Benders
- Origin: Sydney, New South Wales, Australia
- Genres: Jazz
- Years active: 1980–1985
- Labels: Hot
- Past members: Chris Abrahams; Dale Barlow; Lloyd Swanton; Andrew Gander; Jason Morphett

The Benders were an Australian jazz band from 1980 to 1985. The group's members included Chris Abrahams on keyboards, Dale Barlow on saxophone, Louis Burdett on drums, Andrew Gander on drums, Jason Morphett on saxophone, and Lloyd Swanton on bass guitar. They issued three albums, E (1983), False Laughter (1984) and Distance (1985).

== History ==
The Benders were formed in 1980 in Sydney by Chris Abrahams on keyboards, Dale Barlow on tenor saxophone, Louis Burdett on drums and Lloyd Swanton on bass guitar. Burdett was replaced by Andrew Gander on drums. Abrahams, Barlow, Gander and Swanton had all attended New South Wales State Conservatorium of Music. The Benders played at local music venues, including a residency at the Paradise Jazz Club, Kings Cross for three nights a week.

Swanton was advised by teachers at the conservatorium to hold non-jazz gigs to survive, "Perhaps the teachers felt they were merely being pragmatic, but I, along with others of my generation, refused to accept this model, and The Benders were a clear expression of this belief." Jazz music writer, John Shand, remembered first seeing them in the early 1980s, "I was stunned by their originality and the rock-band-like intensity, energy and performance qualities."

Barlow left the Benders late in 1982 to work in the United States, however he was recorded on their debut album, E (1983), before he was replaced by Jason Morphett. E had been recorded in September 1982 at radio station, 2MBS-FM's studio with Abrahams and Swanton co-producing. Adrian Jackson of The Age described the group, "a very exciting band indeed, playing worthy original themes and improvising with plenty of abandon."

Abrahams told Jackson how they had changed after recording the album, "I think we're playing a lot more freely in a sense. We play a few lesser-known standards, few Monk compositions, but we mainly do original tunes." Jackson caught their gig at the RMIT in October 1983 and observed, "they have developed a firm group identity, playing aggressively and with a sense of purpose... Most numbers are played with the tempo fairly fast and the volume fairly loud: Swanton and Gander work unflaggingly to maintain the momentum while Abrahams and Morphett play twisting, increasingly heated solos." Also in that year Abrahams provided piano for the Laughing Clowns' album, Law of Nature, which was released in the following year.

False Laughter (1984), the Bender's second album, was also co-produced by Abrahams and Swanton. Jackson opined, "the skill these young musicians possess is certainly formidable. The strength of their mostly original repertoire is a plus for the Benders, but what really sets them apart from most other Australian groups is the way they play their music... Despite the success of their recent LP False Laughter (on Hot Records), and the acclaim they have received from a wide variety of audiences in Sydney and elsewhere. The Benders have recently been finding the music scene in Sydney quiet Lloyd Swanton told me last week: 'We've only got one regular weekly gig at the moment, and we don't even know if we'll still have that when we get back from Melbourne'."

The group's third and final album, Distance, followed in 1985. The group broke up and Abrahams issued his debut solo album, Piano, in the same year. He then formed the Sparklers (1985–87) before recombining with Swanton to form the Necks in 1987. Swanton was briefly a member of Dynamic Hepnotics in 1986 before the Necks.

== Discography ==
- E (1983) – Hot Records (HOT 1002)
- False Laughter (1984) – Hot Records (HOT 1006)
- Distance (1985) – Hot Records
