= Live (Dynamic Hepnotics album) =

Live album by Dynamic Hepnotics
- Released: December 1984
- Recorded: 10 October 1984
- Venue: Billboard in Melbourne
- Genre: Soul, jazz, funk
- Length: 46:11
- Label: White Label Records, Mushroom Records
- Producer: Mark Sydow, Dynamic Hepnotics

Dynamic Hepnotics chronology
Live (1984)	Take You Higher (1985)

Live is a live album by Australian soul and funk band Dynamic Hepnotics, released in December 1984. The album charted at number 66 on the Australian Kent Music Report.

== Track listing ==
Side one
No.	Title	Writer(s)	Length
1.	"Turn On Your Lovelight"	Deadric Malone, Joe Scott	4:28
2.	"Out of Control"	Robert Susz	3:28
3.	"I'll Make You"	Bruce Allen	2:38
4.	"Things I Do for You"	Autry DeWalt, Lawrence Horn	3:00
5.	"Hepnobeat"	Susz	5:23

Side two
No.	Title	Writer(s)	Length
6.	"Ain't That Enough"	Allen	3:00
7.	"The Last to Know"	Andrew Silver	2:38
8.	"(I'm a) Roadrunner"	Holland–Dozier–Holland	3:00
9.	"Shake Your Hips"	James Moore	6:08
10.	"Keep Workin'"	Susz	5:40

2017 reissue bonus tracks
No.	Title	Writer(s)	Length
11.	"The Meaning of Life"	Susz	2:28
12.	"Ting-A-Ling"	Susz	3:14
13.	"I'm Your Breadmaker, Baby"	Moore	2:39
14.	"Mohair Sam"	Dallas Frazier	2:12
15.	"I'm Shakin'"	Rudy Toombs	3:20
16.	"Cry to Me"	Bert Berns	2:36
17.	"Soul Time"	Susz	2:18
18.	"Tell Me What You're Gonna Do"	James Brown	1:57
19.	"Soul Kind of Feeling"	Susz	3:29
20.	"Can I Get a Witness"	Holland–Dozier–Holland	2:58
21.	"You Better Believe It Baby"	Joseph Arrington Jr.	2:58
22.	"What'd I Say"	Ray Charles	4:52

== Charts ==
Chart (1985)	Peak position
Australian Kent Music Report	66

== Personnel ==
- Robert 'Continental' Susz – vocals, harp
- Andrew Silver – guitar, vocals
- Alan Britton – bass, vocals
- Robert Souter – drums
- Bruce Allen – saxophone, vocals
- Mike Gubb – keyboards
- Guest artist: Jason McDermid – trumpet

Production

- Producer – Mark Sydow, The Dynamic Hepnotics
- Recorded and mixed by Ross Cockle
- Photography by John Brash
