= Melanie Oxley =

- Born: Melanie Susan Oxley; Kingscliff, New South Wales, Australia
- Genres: Rock, dance-pop, soul pop
- Occupations: Musician, singer-songwriter
- Years active: 1983–present
- Labels: Mighty Boy, Spiral Scratch, Remote Control, Vitamin

Melanie Susan Oxley is an Australian musician, singer-songwriter and primary school teacher. Oxley was a member of the dance pop group, The Sparklers (from 1985 to 1989), which in October 1988 released their debut album, Persuasion.

Since 1989 Oxley teamed with keyboardist, Chris Abrahams to perform and record as a soul pop duo, Melanie Oxley & Chris Abrahams. They have released four studio albums, Welcome to Violet, Coal, Jerusalem Bay and Blood Oranges. At the ARIA Music Awards of 1993 Welcome to Violet was nominated for ARIA Award for Best Independent Release.

== Biography ==
=== Early life ===
Melanie Susan Oxley is the daughter of Eric and Jan Oxley. Eric, an art teacher, was originally from Manchester and had migrated to Sydney before the Oxley family settled in the rural northern beach community of Kingscliff in 1965. Oxley's older brothers are Peter and Jeremy Oxley (born ca. 1961), who founded Australian pop-rock band The Sunnyboys, and her younger brothers are Damien and Tim (singer, guitarist, drummer in The Humdingers, The Verys, The Dearhunters, and Roger Loves Betty).

=== 1984-1988: Paris Green and The Sparklers ===
Oxley performed with Louis Tillett's jazz influenced blues-rock band Paris Green in 1984, alongside Charlie Owen. She performed backing vocals on The Triffids' 1984 EP, Raining Pleasure. In early 1985 she worked for the Johnny Kannis Band with Richard Jakimyszyn on guitar, Tony Juke on keyboards and guitar, Kannis on lead vocals, Tony Robertson on bass guitar, Don Raffael on saxophone and Destroyer on drums. Also that year she was briefly in Sweet Nothing. Later that year, Oxley formed a dance pop band, The Sparklers, in Sydney with Chris Abrahams (ex-Benders) on keyboards; her brother Peter Oxley on bass guitar; Bill Bilson (The Sunnyboys) on drums; and Mark Walker (Hoi Polloi, Sweet Nothing) on guitar – who was replaced by Colin Bloxsom, a year later. The Sparklers released two singles before Abrahams left, he was replaced by Phil Grove. The Sparklers released an album, Persuasion, in October 1988 with Oxley writing all tracks except one co-written with Abrahams.

after my brothers' band [The Sunnboys] split up, my brother Peter and I started the Sparklers with Chris, although he left before that album [Persuasion] was made.

— Melanie Oxley,

Persuasion was produced by Leszek Karski on Mighty Boys Records before the group disbanded in 1989. Oxley also performed backing vocals for Johanna Pigott's band Scribble, appearing on their 1986 album Pop Art, as well as on Ed Kuepper's 1986 album Rooms of the Magnificent. Other 1980s work includes The Spliffs House of Seven (1988) and Penguins on Safari's Normal Soon (1989).

=== 1989-present: Melanie Oxley & Chris Abrahams ===
In 1989 Oxley formed a soul pop duo, Melanie Oxley & Chris Abrahams, with ex-The Sparklers bandmate, Abrahams (by then also a pianist-songwriter for experimental jazz trio, The Necks). She worked periodically with Abrahams, performing, writing songs and recording albums, while maintaining a career as a primary school teacher. In December 1990 the duo released a four-track EP, Resisting Calm, on Spiral Scratch Records. For the EP they used Tony Buck on drums, Mike Bukovsky on trumpet, Gerard Corben (ex-The Sparklers) on guitar, Guy Dickerson on guitar, Stuart Eadie on floor toms, Jackie Orszaczky on bass guitar and Lloyd Swanton on acoustic bass. It was co-produced by Abrahams and Oxley. National radio station, Triple J, placed the track, "Benchtop", on high rotation – a live version appeared on the compilation album, Live at the Wireless 2 (1991). Their debut studio album, Welcome to Violet, followed in October 1992 on Remote Control Records, which exemplified their "moody, emotive soul/pop" sound. At the ARIA Music Awards of 1993, Welcome to Violet was nominated for Best Independent Release. On 3 October 1994, their second studio album, Coal, appeared.

Their third studio album, Jerusalem Bay, was issued in December 1998 and was produced by Oxley and Abrahams. Additional musicians included Mike Bukowski on trumpet (ex-Ten Part Invention) and Hamish Stuart on drums (Ayers Rock, Wig World, Catholics). The album includes a cover version of "Cry Me a River" written by Arthur Hamilton. Blood Oranges the fourth studio album was released in April 2003 on Vitamin Records. The Age's Michael Dwyer described their sound as "sophisticated, sometimes jazz-tinted pop" while Oxley feels "It's quite a different album to Jerusalem Bay, and it was recorded differently. That one was much more organic and live. With Blood Oranges, Chris did a lot of work before we went into the studio, quite a lot of programming". Session musicians included Stuart, Michael Sheridan on guitar and Jonathan Zwartz on bass guitar. Vitamin Records promoted the album as being "Coloured by a strange, at times, dark playfulness, [it] is dotted throughout with classic sounding songs drawn from a number of pop influences. Lyrically thoughtful, deceptively simple".

In April 2003 Sydney Morning Herald's John Shand reviewed their performance at The Basement, he found Oxley used "a lot of breath aerating [her] lovely voice. Unlike, say, Renée Geyer, however, this does not make it husky, but creates a soft-edged, whispering quality, which remains unaffected by volume, and which suggests innocence and sensuality in equal measure". In October that year ABC Radio National broadcast South Island on The Listening Room; South Island was a joint project by Oxley (performer) with Abrahams (composer and performer) and Sherre DeLys (text and sound design).

In January 2008 Oxley and Abraham provided "a simply devastating performance of 'Embedded'" at a tribute concert for its deceased songwriter, David McComb of The Triffids. A documentary film, It's Raining Pleasure (2009), showcased the performances and included an interview with Oxley, it was screened at the Adelaide International Film Festival.

== Personal life ==
As of July 2003 Melanie Oxley's domestic partner is former drummer and television producer, Angus Millar. Oxley is a mother of three children and outside her musical career she is a primary school teacher who has taught at Newtown Public School, Annandale Public School and Summer Hill Public School in Sydney's inner west.

== Melanie Oxley & Chris Abrahams Discography ==
=== Albums ===
Title	Album details
Welcome To Violet	Released: October 1992; Label: Remote Music (Rem 1); Format: CD
Coal	Released: October 1994; Label: Remote Music (Rem 2); Format: CD
Jerusalem Bay	Released: December 1998; Label: Remote Music (Rem 4); Format: CD
Blood Oranges	Released: April 2003; Label: Remote Music (Rem 5); Format: CD, digital
Moment of Truth	Released: April 2023; Label: Remote (REM6); Format: CD

=== Extended plays ===
Title	EP details
Resisting Calm	Released: December 1990; Label: Spiral Scratch (0008); Format: CD, LP

== Awards and nominations ==
=== ARIA Music Awards ===
The ARIA Music Awards are a set of annual ceremonies presented by Australian Recording Industry Association (ARIA), which recognise excellence, innovation, and achievement across all genres of the music of Australia. They commenced in 1987.

Year	Nominee / work	Award	Result	Ref.
1993	Welcome to Violet (with Chris Abrahams)	Best Independent Release	Nominated	
