= The Boys (1998 film) =

- The Boys DVD cover
- Directed by: Rowan Woods
- Screenplay by: Stephen Sewell
- Based on: The Boys by Gordon Graham
- Produced by: Robert Connolly; John Maynard
- Starring: David Wenham; Toni Collette; Lynette Curran; John Polson; Anthony Hayes
- Cinematography: Tristan Milani
- Edited by: Nick Meyers
- Music by: The Necks; Alan Lamb
- Distributed by: Roadshow Entertainment
- Release date: 7 May 1998
- Running time: 86 minutes
- Country: Australia
- Language: English
- Budget: $2.5 million

The Boys is a 1998 Australian drama film directed by Rowan Woods. The screenplay by Stephen Sewell is based on the play by Gordon Graham, with Graham influenced by the 1986 murder of Anita Cobby, with the play first performed by Griffin Theatre Company under the direction of Alex Galeazzi.

== Plot ==
After serving time in prison for an assault on a liquor store employee, Brett Sprague is released from prison and returns home to his two brothers and their girlfriends, mother and stepfather. Things have changed, and as Brett begins to drink his way through the day, he regains his "top-dog" position one argument at a time. This power trip gets Brett and his brothers united in rage against their girlfriends and mother, and they are involved in a heinous crime. The aftermath of the night unfolds through the story with flashforwards.

== Cast ==
- David Wenham as Brett Sprague
- Toni Collette as Michelle
- Lynette Curran as Sandra Sprague
- John Polson as Glenn Sprague
- Anthony Hayes as Stevie Sprague
- Jeanette Cronin as Jackie
- Anna Lise Phillips as Nola
- Pete Smith as Abo
- Sal Sharah as Nick
- Peter Hehir as Graham Newman
- Teo Gebert as Constable Zammit

== Production ==
The Boys is Rowan Woods' directorial debut, and actor Peter Hehir's last film before he retired from acting. Woods "aimed to achieve a combination of documentary-style naturalism with the edge of a thriller." Woods also said that the first time he read the play, he felt "it was an Australian story that had to be told. (…) This is the inside story of a family in crisis, of three boys on the day before a nasty crime takes place, of which they are accused."

The producer of the film, Robert Connolly, had also produced the play. He met Rowan Woods at film school, and they both suggested to John Maynard they make the movie. The script was adapted by playwright Stephen Sewell.

Shooting was done on location in a rented house in Maroubra, one of Sydney's Eastern Suburbs. The location used to shoot the scene of the heinous crime was filmed at the Eastlakes Shopping Centre in Eastlakes, another eastern suburb.

== Accolades ==
The original music score is composed by The Necks, with other music contributed by sound designer Alan Lamb.

| Award | Category | Subject | Result |
|---|---|---|---|
| AACTA Awards (1998 AFI Awards) | Best Film | Robert Connolly | Nominated |
| AACTA Awards (1998 AFI Awards) | Best Film | John Maynard | Nominated |
| AACTA Awards (1998 AFI Awards) | Best Direction | Rowan Woods | Won |
| AACTA Awards (1998 AFI Awards) | Best Adapted Screenplay | Stephen Sewell | Won |
| AACTA Awards (1998 AFI Awards) | Best Actor | David Wenham | Nominated |
| AACTA Awards (1998 AFI Awards) | Best Actress | Lynette Curran | Nominated |
| AACTA Awards (1998 AFI Awards) | Best Supporting Actor | John Polson | Won |
| AACTA Awards (1998 AFI Awards) | Best Supporting Actor | Anthony Hayes | Nominated |
| AACTA Awards (1998 AFI Awards) | Best Supporting Actress | Toni Collette | Won |
| AACTA Awards (1998 AFI Awards) | Best Cinematography | Tristan Milani | Nominated |
| AACTA Awards (1998 AFI Awards) | Best Editing | Nick Meyers | Nominated |
| AACTA Awards (1998 AFI Awards) | Best Original Music Score | The Necks | Nominated |
| AACTA Awards (1998 AFI Awards) | Best Sound | Peter Grace | Nominated |
| AACTA Awards (1998 AFI Awards) | Best Sound | Phil Judd | Nominated |
| AACTA Awards (1998 AFI Awards) | Best Sound | Sam Petty | Nominated |
| AACTA Awards (1998 AFI Awards) | Best Costume Design | Annie Marshall | Nominated |
| ASSG Award | Best Location Recording | Peter Grace | Won |
| ASSG Award | Best Location Recording | Serge Stanley | Won |
| ASSG Award | Best Location Recording | Michael Taylor | Won |
| Berlin International Film Festival | Golden Bear | Rowan Woods | Nominated |
| FCCA Awards | Best Film | Robert Connolly | Won |
| FCCA Awards | Best Film | John Maynard | Won |
| FCCA Awards | Best Director | Roman Woods | Won |
| FCCA Awards | Readers' Award for Favourite Australian Film | Roman Woods | Won |
| FCCA Awards | Best Adapted Screenplay | Stephen Sewell | Won |
| FCCA Awards | Best Actor | David Wenham | Nominated |
| FCCA Awards | Best Supporting Actor | John Polson | Nominated |
| FCCA Awards | Best Supporting Actor | Anthony Hayes | Nominated |
| FCCA Awards | Best Supporting Actress | Toni Collette | Nominated |
| FCCA Awards | Best Supporting Actress | Lynette Curran | Won |
| FCCA Awards | Best Cinematography | Tristan Milani | Nominated |
| FCCA Awards | Best Music Score | The Necks | Nominated |

== See also ==
- Cinema of Australia
- List of Australian films
