= Take You Higher =

Take You Higher may refer to:

- "Take You Higher" (Goodwill and Hook n Sling song), 2011
- "Take You Higher" (Wilkinson song), 2013
- Take You Higher (album), a 1985 album by Dynamic Hepnotics

== See also ==
- "I Want to Take You Higher", a song by Sly and the Family Stone
- "Stacey (Take You Higher)", a song by XO
