= Blue Shift (album) =

Studio album by Clarion Fracture Zone
- Released: 1990
- Recorded: March 1990
- Venue: ABC Studio 221, Sydney
- Genre: Jazz
- Label: Rufus Records, ABC Music

Clarion Fracture Zone chronology
Blue Shift (1990)	Zones on Parade (1993)

Blue Shift is the debut studio album by Australian contemporary jazz ensemble Clarion Fracture Zone.

At the ARIA Music Awards of 1991, the album won ARIA Award for Best Jazz Album.

== Track listing ==
No.	Title	Length
1.	"Blue Shift"	5:09
2.	"Moeshoeshoe The First"	7:08
3.	"The Wild Uproar"	6:16
4.	"Feather Star"	5:09
5.	"La Mar Esta Enferma"	6:19
6.	"Samba Nova"	6:05
7.	"Spice Island"	8:38

== Release history ==
Country	Date	Format	Label	Catalogue
Australia	1990	LP; CD	Rufus Records, ABC Music	RF040
