= Chemist (album) =

Studio album by The Necks
- Released: 19 June 2006
- Studio: Megaphon, St Peters
- Genre: Improvised music
- Length: 60:48
- Label: Fish of Milk/Shock
- Producer: The Necks

The Necks chronology
Mosquito/See Through (2004)	Chemist (2006)	Townsville (2007)

Chemist is the thirteenth album by Australian improvised music trio The Necks (their ninth excluding live and soundtrack albums), which was first released on the Fish of Milk label in 2006 and later on the ReR label, internationally. The album's three tracks, "Fatal", "Buoyant" and "Abillera", were written, performed and produced by the group's members: Chris Abrahams on piano, Lloyd Swanton on double bass and Tony Buck on drums and guitar. It won the ARIA Music Awards Best Jazz Album category in 2006.

== Reception ==
Professional ratings
Review scores
Source	Rating
AllMusic	4.5/5 stars
The Guardian	4/5 stars

AllMusic's François Couture rated the album at four-and-a-half-out-of-five stars and explained, "Throughout the album, despite all the different approaches and new elements, the music remains resolutely, unmistakably the Necks... [it] is the trio's best album since Aether (or, if you don't like their softer side, since Hanging Gardens), an essential for the fan, and a must-have for the casual listener." John L Waters of The Guardian rated it at four-out-of-five stars, "[it] breaks with Necks tradition by featuring three 20-minute pieces, each with different moods and soundworlds. There's the spooky, Miles-ish 'Buoyant'; the dense ambient indie of 'Abillera'; and the dark, rolling groove of 'Fatal', which seems to cry out for a David Lynch video to accompany it."

== Track listing ==
All compositions by the Necks' Chris Abrahams, Tony Buck and Lloyd Swanton.

1. "Fatal" – 21:09
2. "Buoyant" – 19:48
3. "Abillera" – 19:51

== Personnel ==
- Chris Abrahams – piano
- Tony Buck – drums, guitar
- Lloyd Swanton – bass
