= Townville =

Townville may refer to:

- Townville, Pennsylvania, a borough in Crawford County
- Townville, South Carolina, an unincorporated community in Anderson County
- Townville Cricket Club, a club from Castleford, who play in the Bradford Cricket League

== See also ==
- Townsville (disambiguation)
