= Alister Spence =

Australian jazz pianist and composer

- Genre: Jazz
- Occupations: Musician, composer
- Instrument: Piano
- Label: Rufus
- Website: alisterspence.com

Alister Spence is an Australian jazz pianist and composer.

Spence leads the Alister Spence Trio with Lloyd Swanton and Toby Hall. They were nominated for the ARIA Award for Best Jazz Album in 2004 for Flux and in 2007 for Mercury.

Bands and artists he has recorded with include the Raymond MacDonald International Big Band, Clarion Fracture Zone, Wanderlust, Australian Art Orchestra, Andrew Robson, and Carl Orr.

He was a composer for numerous Ivan Sen films including Journey, Tears, Vanish, Wind, Dust, Shifting Shelter, Yellow Fella, A Sister's Love and Beneath Clouds. For the latter Sen and Spence were nominated for the 2002 AFI Award for Best Original Music Score and the FCCA Award for Best Music Score. Other films he has composed for include Molly and Mobarak, Dakiyarr versus the King, Spirit Stones, and In My Father's Country.

== Discography ==
=== Albums ===
| Title | Details |
|---|---|
| Three is a Circle (as Alister Spence Trio) | Released: 2000; Label: Rufus (RF055); Format: CD |
| Flux (as Alister Spence Trio) | Released: 2003; Label: Rufus (RF065); Format: CD |
| Mercury (as Alister Spence Trio) | Released: 2006; Label: Rufus (RF075); Format: CD |
| Fit (as Alister Spence Trio) | Released: August 2009; Label: Rufus; Format: CD, DD |
| Stepping Between the Shadows (with Raymond MacDonald) | Released: April 2012; Label: Rufus (RF95); Format: CD, DD |
| Far Flung (as Alister Spence Trio) | Released: November 2012; Label: Rufus (RF105); Format: CD, DD |
| Everything Here is Possible (as Alister Spence Trio) | Released: June 2014; Label: Alister Spence Music (ASM002); Format: CD, DD |
| Begin (with Joe Williamson and Christopher Cantillo) | Released: February 2015; Label: Alister Spence, Joe Williamson, Christopher Cantillo (ASM003); Format: CD, DD |
| Alister Spence Trio Live (as Alister Spence Trio) | Released: 2015; Label: Alister Spence Music (ASM004); Format: CD, DD |
| Not Everything But Enough (with Myra Melford) | Released: August 2017; Label: Alister Spence Music (ASM005); Format: CD, DD |
| Sound Hotel (with Raymond MacDonald) | Released: March 2018; Label: Alister Spence & Raymond MacDonald (ASM006); Format: CD, DD |
| Intelsat (with Satoko Fujii) | Released: September 2018; Label: Alister Spence (ASM007); Format: CD |
| Imagine Meeting You Here (with Satoko Fujii Orchestra Kobe) | Released: January 2019; Label: Alister Spence (ASM008); Format: CD |
| Whirlpool | Released: 2020; Label: Alister Spence (ASM009); Format: CD |

== Awards and nominations ==
=== AIR Awards ===
The Australian Independent Record Awards (commonly known informally as AIR Awards) is an annual awards night to recognise, promote and celebrate the success of Australia's Independent Music sector.

| Year | Nominee / work | Award | Result |
|---|---|---|---|
| 2010 | Fit | Best Independent Jazz Album | Nominated |

=== ARIA Music Awards ===
The ARIA Music Awards is an annual awards ceremony that recognises excellence, innovation, and achievement across all genres of Australian music. They commenced in 1987.

| Year | Nominee / work | Award | Result | Ref. |
|---|---|---|---|---|
| 2004 | Flux (Alister Spence Trio) | Best Jazz Album | Nominated | |
| 2007 | Mercury (Alister Spence Trio) | Best Jazz Album | Nominated | |
