= Drive By (album) =

Studio album by The Necks
- Released: 2003
- Recorded: 2003
- Genre: Improvised music
- Length: 60:16
- Label: Fish of Milk

The Necks chronology
Photosynthetic (2003)	Drive By (2003)	Mosquito/See Through (2004)

Professional ratings
Review scores
Source	Rating
AllMusic	4.5/5 stars
Pitchfork	7.4/10
Uncut	5/5 stars

Drive By is the eleventh album by Australian improvised music trio The Necks (their seventh excluding live and soundtrack albums). It was first released on the Fish of Milk label in 2003 and later on the ReR label internationally. The album features a single hour-long track, titled "Drive By", performed by Chris Abrahams, Lloyd Swanton and Tony Buck.

== Reception ==
The Guardian review likened the album to "an hour-long ride through William Gibson territory in a sleek limo, blurred shapes barely visible through the tinted windows" and that The Necks "have created a method of performing that transcends style while retaining meaning - in the most stylish way possible". The album won the ARIA Music Awards Best Jazz album in 2004.

== Track listing ==
1. "Drive By" (The Necks) - 60:16

== Personnel ==
- Chris Abrahams – piano
- Lloyd Swanton – bass
- Tony Buck – drums
