= Dynamic Hepnotics =

Australian soul, blues and funk band

The Dynamic Hepnotics
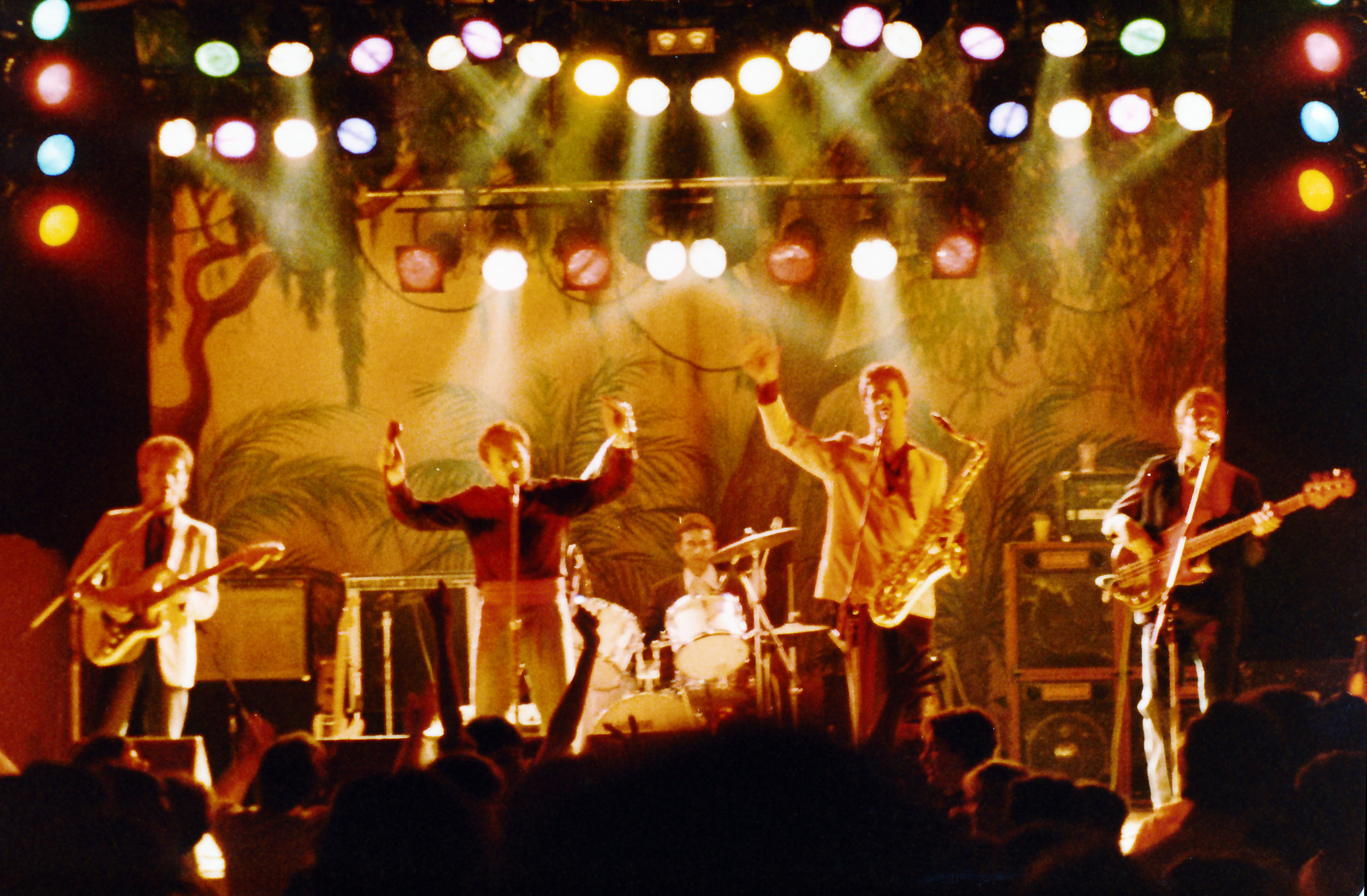

Background information
- Origin: Sydney, New South Wales, Australia
- Genres: Blue-eyed soul, funk
- Years active: 1979–1986
- Labels: Mambo, Missing Link, Mushroom, White Label, Festival
- Past members: Tim Martin; Manuel Patty; Richard Ruhle; Andrew Silver; Robert Susz; Vickie Kenny; Bruce Allen; Allen Britton; Robert Souter; Mike Gubb; Peter Bishop; Dave Brewer; Mark Simmonds; Duncan Archibald; Chris Pascoe; Lloyd Swanton
- Website: dynamichepnotics.com

Dynamic Hepnotics were an Australian soul, blues and funk band who formed in 1979 and disbanded in 1986. Mainstay, lead vocalist and front man, "Continental" Robert Susz formed the group in Sydney. They had chart success on the Australian Kent Music Report Singles Chart with a top 5 single, "Soul Kind of Feeling" in 1984. It was followed by "Gotta Be Wrong (Way to Love)" which reached the top 20 in 1985. Their album, Take You Higher, reached the top 20 on the related Albums Chart in June. In 1986, "Soul Kind of Feeling" won the APRA Music Award for 'Most Performed Australasian Popular Work'.

== History ==
Dynamic Hepnotics formed in Sydney in 1979 with Tim Martin on saxophone (ex-Friends), Manuel Patty on bass guitar, Richard Ruhle on drums, Andrew Silver on guitar (Big Town Playboys) and "Continental" Robert Susz on vocals and harmonica (Rugcutters, Humdinger Dogs). One of their early gigs was at the Potts Point night club, Arthur's. In May 1980 this line-up issued a four-track extended play, Shakin' All Over on the Mambo label. By the time of its release, Silver and Susz had been joined by Bruce Allen on saxophone (ex-Jeff St John Band, Ol' 55), Allen Britton on bass guitar (Mangrove Boogie Kings) and Robert Souter on drums (Lizard, Gulliver's Travels, Living Legends). The group issued a single, "Hepnobeat", in September 1981 and subsequently changed from Mambo to Missing Link Records. Jim Niven from The Sports played organ on the single. An early line-up featured television presenter, Jonathan Coleman, on piano.

In August 1982 they released a six-track EP, Strange Land, which was produced by Ross Wilson (Daddy Cool, Mondo Rock, Jo Jo Zep & The Falcons) for Missing Link. The group contributed to the soundtrack of 1983 feature film, Going Down. By 1984 the band had signed with Mushroom Records' White Label Records. In late January Dynamic Hepnotics appeared at the Narara Music Festival. They released a single, "I'll Make You", in May. Their highest-charting hit, "Soul Kind of Feeling", appeared on the Australian Kent Music Report Singles Chart in October 1984 and peaked at No. 5.

Early in 1985, they issued Live (aka The Dynamic Hepnotics Live), which including cover versions and originals recorded live in the studio. An audible hissing noise was recorded onto the album from the sound of fire extinguishers used to put out a fire under the stage as the group performed. Mike Gubb joined on keyboards. Live was followed by "Gotta Be Wrong (Way to Love)" in May, which reached the top 20. Their album, Take You Higher, reached the top 20 on the related Albums Chart in June. At the end of that year, Dave Brewer replaced Silver on guitar, Mark Simmonds replaced Allen on saxophone and Peter Bishop joined on trumpet. The group's final single, "On Our Way Now", was released in March 1986, which reached the top 100. Souter was replaced by Duncan Archibald on drums, Gubb was replaced by Chris Pascoe on keyboards and Lloyd Swanton replaced Britton on bass guitar. However, the group disbanded before the end of the year. In 1986, "Soul Kind of Feeling" won the APRA Music Award for 'Most Performed Australasian Popular Work'.

== After disbandment ==
In 1988 Susz formed a "stylish soul / R&B" group, The Mighty Reapers, with Archibald, Brewer and Ruhle. That group recorded three albums, The Mighty Reapers (1993), Trouble People (1994) and The Hurt Is On (1997). Susz was later in the group, Continental Blues Party. Bruce Allen later toured &/or recorded with The Allniters, Eurogliders, The Eddys, Glenn Shorrock, Doug Parkinson and Ross Wilson, and currently performs with a number of Sydney-based bands including The Layabouts, The Bellhops and The Hollywood Hombres. Mike Gubb has worked with a number of Australian bands, including Mental As Anything, Ganggajang, The Whitlams and Dog Trumpet. Lloyd Swanton formed a jazz trio, The Necks, in 1987 with Chris Abrahams and Tony Buck. Dave Brewer has worked with The Catholics (formed by Swanton in 1991) and currently performs with Perth-based blues band The Doodaddies. In late 2008, Brewer released a solo album titled Life of Riley. Richard Ruhle performs with Sydney-based jazz 4-piece Seriously Cool. Robert Souter performs with Mental As Anything. Duncan Archibald performs with Sydney-based band The Moods.

Four of the original band members (Susz, Souter, Britton and Brewer) performed 2 shows under the Dynamic Hepnotics name in 2015, at the Caloundra Music Festival and the last ever Narooma-based Great Southern Blues and Roots Music Festival.

== Discography ==
=== Albums ===
List of albums, with selected chart positions
Title	Album details	Peak chart positions
Title	Album details	AUS
Live	Released: December 1984; Label: White Label (L27147); Note: live album	66
Take You Higher	Released: May 1985; Label: White Label (RML 53164)	30

=== Compilation albums ===
Title	Details
Hepnobest	Released: 2016; Label: Right On Records (ROR1609)

=== Extended plays ===
Title	Details
Shakin' All Over	Released: 1980; Label: Mambo Records (MAMBO 501)
Strange Land	Released: 1982; Label: Missing Link (ING 007

=== Singles ===
List of singles, with selected chart positions
Year	Title	Peak chart positions
Year	Title	AUS
1981	"Hepnobeat"	-
1984	"I'll Make You"	-
1984	"Soul Kind of Feeling"	5
1984	"Gotta Be Wrong (Way to Love)"	20
1985	"Whenever You're Ready"	-
1985	"Believe Me"	-
1986	"On Our Way Now"	86

== Awards and nominations ==
=== Countdown Australian Music Awards ===
Countdown was an Australian pop music TV series on national broadcaster ABC-TV from 1974 to 1987, it presented music awards from 1979 to 1987, initially in conjunction with magazine TV Week. The TV Week / Countdown Awards were a combination of popular-voted and peer-voted awards.

Year	Nominee / work	Award	Result
1984	"Soul Kind of Feeling"	Best Single	Nominated

== Band personnel ==
Credits:

Vocals, harmonica

- Robert Susz (1979–1986)

Guitar

- Andrew Silver (1979–1986)
- Dave Brewer (1986)

Bass guitar

- Manuel Patty (1979)
- Vickie Kenny (1979–1980)
- Allen Britton (1980–1986)
- Lloyd Swanton (1986)

Drums

- Richard Ruhle (1979–1980)
- Robert Souter (1980–1986)
- Duncan Archibald (1986)

Saxophone

- Tim Martin (1979–1980)
- Bruce Allen (1980–1985)
- Mark Simmonds (1985–1986)

Trumpet

- Peter Bishop (1985–1986)

Keyboard

- Mike Gubb (1985–1986)
- Chris Pascoe (1986)
