= Take You Higher (album) =

Studio album by Dynamic Hepnotics
- Released: 3 May 1985
- Recorded: January 1984−February 1985
- Studio: Alberts Studio, Studios 301
- Genre: Funk, jazz, blue-eyed soul
- Label: White Label Records, Mushroom Records
- Producer: The Dynamic Hepnotics, Mark Sydow

Dynamic Hepnotics chronology
Live (1984)	Take You Higher (1985)	Hepnobest (2016)

Take You Higher is the first and only studio album by Australian funk band Dynamic Hepnotics, released in May 1985. Take You Higher peaked at number 30 on the Australian Kent Music Report.

== Track listing ==
Side One

No.	Title	Writer(s)	Length
1.	"Whenever You're Ready"	Bruce Allen	3:14
2.	"Just a Dream"	Robert Susz	3:22
3.	"I Don't Want Nobody"	Bruce Allen	3:29
4.	"Trouble in Paradise"	Andrew Silver	3:32
5.	"Believe Me"	Robert Susz	4:16

Side Two

No.	Title	Writer(s)	Length
1.	"Gotta Be Wrong (Way To Love)"	Robert Susz	4:06
2.	"Dangerous Time"	Andrew Silver	3:07
3.	"Ting-a-Ling"	Robert Susz	3:02
4.	"Talk About Her Sister"	Mike Gubb, Tony Backhouse	3:17
5.	"Soul Kind of Feeling"	Robert Susz	3:54

== Charts ==
Chart (1985)	Peak position
Australian Kent Music Report	30
New Zealand Albums (RMNZ)	30
