= Soul Kind of Feeling =

Single by Dynamic Hepnotics

from the album Take You Higher
- B-side: "Last to Know"
- Released: 27 August 1984
- Recorded: January–March 1984
- Genre: Soul, pop/rock
- Length: 3:54
- Label: White Label
- Songwriter: Robert Susz
- Producers: Mark Sydow, Dynamic Hepnotics

Dynamic Hepnotics singles chronology
"I'll Make You" (1984)	"Soul Kind of Feeling" (1984)	"Gotta Be Wrong (Way to Love)" (1984)

"Soul Kind of Feeling" is a single released in August 1984 by Australian soul music group Dynamic Hepnotics from their album Take You Higher. It was their highest charting hit, which appeared on the Australian Kent Music Report Singles Chart in October 1984 and peaked at No. 5. It charted higher in neighbourly country New Zealand, spending eight weeks in the top 10 and peaking at No. 3 on June 30, 1985. In 1986, "Soul Kind of Feeling" won the APRA Music Award for 'Most Performed Australasian Popular Work'.

"Soul Kind of Feeling" was written by lead singer, Robert Susz. The 12-inch single version, "Soul Kind of Feeling (12" Hepno Mix)" was remixed and extended from the earlier 7-inch single. Both were issued on Mushroom Records' White Label Records. In 1998, Mushroom released a three-track CD version.

The music video was directed by Fiona Cochrane.

== Other uses ==
The song featured prominently in the background in Australian soap opera Neighbours until the early nineties. The song was also performed in an episode of Home and Away by Dan Baker (Tim Campbell), at the reception of his wedding to Leah Patterson (Ada Nicodemou).

== Track listing ==
7" single version

1. "Soul Kind of Feeling" (Robert Susz) – 3:54
2. "Last to Know" (Andrew Silver) – 2:40

12" single version

1. "Soul Kind of Feeling (12" Hepno Mix)" – 5:07
2. "Last to Know" – 2:40

CD version

1. "Soul Kind of Feeling" – 3:54
2. "Last to Know" – 2:40
3. "Gotta Be Wrong (Way to Love)" (Robert Susz) – 4:06

== Credits and personnel ==
Dynamic Hepnotics

Credited to:

- Bruce Allen – saxophone
- Allen Britton – bass guitar
- Andrew Silver – guitar
- Robert Souter – drums
- Robert Susz – vocals, harmonica
- Ian Dixon - trumpet, piccolo trumpet (guest)

Production

- Producer – Mark Sydow, Dynamic Hepnotics
- Engineer – Tony Cohen recorded at Alberts, Sydney
- Mixing engineer – John Bee mixed at EMI Studios 301, Sydney
  - Remixer – John Bee, Mark Sydow (for 12" version)

== Charts ==
=== Weekly charts ===
Chart (1984–1985)	Peak position
Australia (Kent Music Report)	5
New Zealand (Recorded Music NZ)	3

=== Year-end charts ===
Chart (1984)	Peak position
Australia (Kent Music Report)	53
