= Wanderlust (Mike Bukovsky album) =

Studio album by Mike Bukovsky
- Released: 1993
- Studio: Festival Studios
- Label: ABC Jazz
- Producer: Tony Gorman

Wanderlust is a studio album by Australian jazz musician Mike Bukovsky, released in 1993.

At the ARIA Music Awards of 1994 the album won the ARIA Award for Best Jazz Album.

== Track listing ==
1. "Bronte Cafe" - 6:56
2. "Dakar" - 9:37
3. "I Hear You" - 8:30
4. "Only Connect" - 9:07
5. "Ornettelogic" - 13:35
6. "Game of Gulf" - 6:10
7. "MDD" - 7:54
8. "Pressure Makes Diamonds" - 4:25
9. "Mr Whippy" - 9:40
