= Alan Lamb (musician) =

Australian musician (1944–2025)

- Born: 1944; Edinburgh, Scotland
- Died: 19 April 2025 (aged 81) Perth, Australia
- Genres: Field Recording, Sound Art
- Occupations: Sound Artist, Biomedical Research Scientist
- Labels: Dorobo, Vox Australis

Alan Lamb (1944 – 19 April 2025) was an Australian artist, composer and sound sculptor.

== Life and career ==
During the early 1970s Lamb studied for a PhD in neurophysiology at the University of Edinburgh.

He is best known for installations of large scale Aeolian harps, such as his album Primal Image, which consists of contact microphone recordings of kilometre long spans of telegraph wire on 12 acres (49,000 m^{2}) in rural Baldivis south of Perth purchased for that purpose.

Lamb died in Perth on 19 April 2025, at the age of 81.
