= Clarion Fracture Zone (band) =

Australian jazz band

- Origin: Sydney, New South Wales, Australia
- Genres: Jazz
- Years active: 1988 -
- Members: Sandy Evans: Tony Gorman; Alister Spence; Lloyd Swanton; Toby Hall
- Past members: Steve Elphick; Andrew Dickeson; Louis Burdett; Tony Buck

Clarion Fracture Zone is an Australian contemporary jazz ensemble. Their debut album Blue Shift (1990), released through ABC Records, won the 1991 ARIA Award for Best Jazz Album. It was recorded by the line-up of Sandy Evans on tenor and soprano saxophones; Tony Gorman on alto and tenor saxophones, clarinet and percussion; Alister Spence on piano and keyboards; Steve Elphick on bass guitar; Andrew Dickeson on drums and percussion. They were also nominated in the same category in 1997 for their fourth album, Less Stable Elements (1996).

== Members ==
- Sandy Evans: saxophones (tenor, soprano)
- Tony Gorman: saxophones (alto, tenor), clarinet
- Alister Spence: piano, keyboards
- Lloyd Swanton: double bass
- Toby Hall: drums

Former

- Steve Elphick: bass
- Andrew Dickeson: drums
- Louis Burdett: drums
- Tony Buck: drums

== Discography ==
=== Albums ===
List of albums, with selected details
Title	Details
Blue Shift	Released: 1990; Format: LP, CD; Label: ABC Records (846 221-2)
Zones On Parade	Released: 1993; Format: CD; Label: Rufus Records (RF001)
What This Love Can Do	Released: 1994; Format: CD; Label: Rufus Records (RF010)
Less Stable Elements	Released: 1996; Format: CD; Label: Rufus Records (RF020)
Canticle (with the Martenitsa Choir)	Released: 2001; Format: CD; Label: Rufus Records (RF060)

== Awards ==
=== ARIA Music Awards ===
The ARIA Music Awards is an annual awards ceremony that recognises excellence, innovation, and achievement across all genres of Australian music. They commenced in 1987.

Year	Nominee / work	Award	Result	Ref.
1991	Blue Shift	Best Jazz Album	Won	
1997	Less Stable Elements	Best Jazz Album	Nominated	
