= The Necks =

Australian avant-garde jazz trio

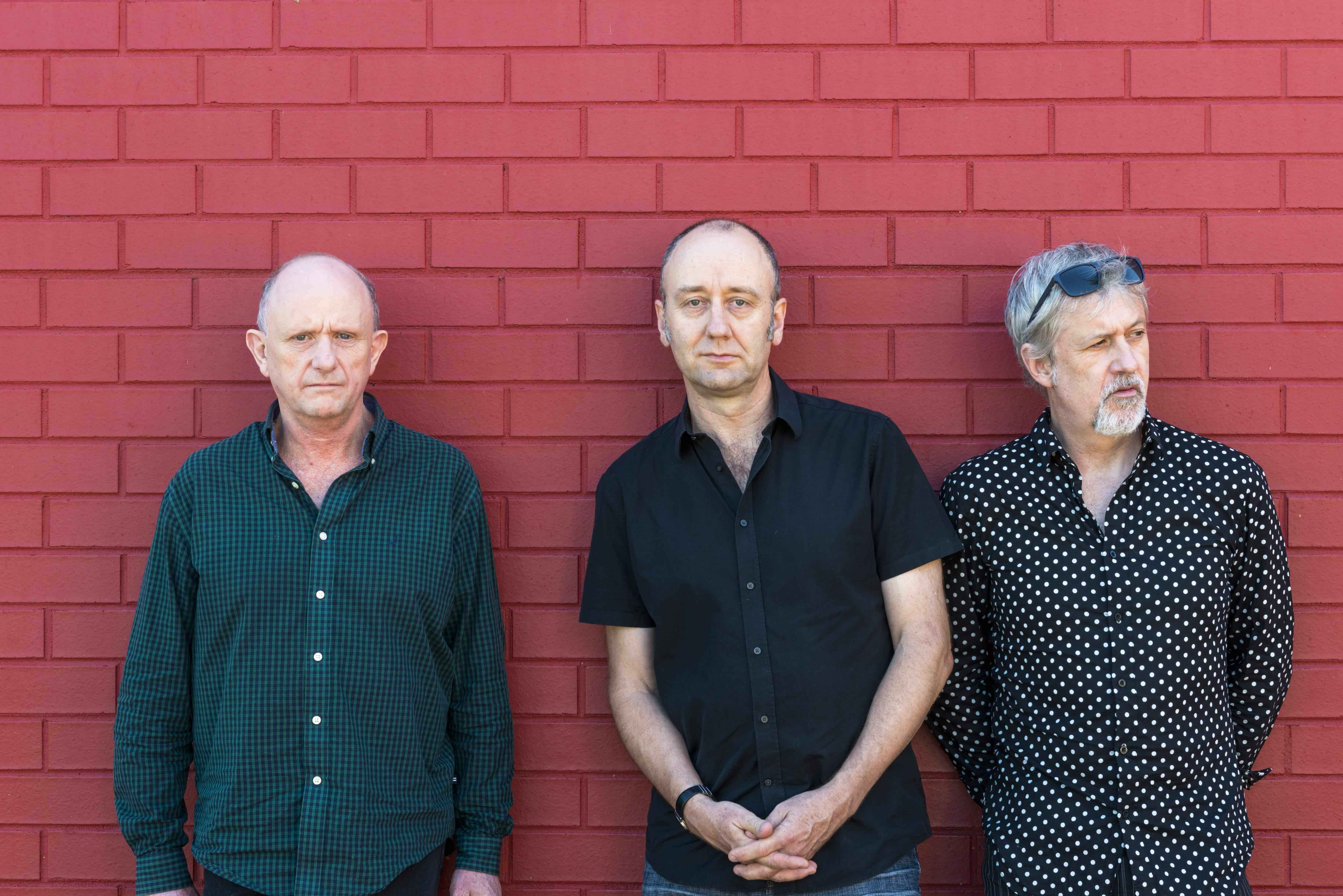
- Chris Abrahams, Lloyd Swanton, Tony Buck

Background information
- Origin: Sydney, New South Wales, Australia
- Genres: Experimental; avant-garde jazz; free improvisation; minimalist
- Years active: 1987–present
- Labels: Spiral Scratch; Fish of Milk/Shock; Wild Sound/MDS; Carpet Bomb; Ideologic Organ/Editions Mego; Private/BMG; Northern Spy
- Members: Chris Abrahams; Tony Buck; Lloyd Swanton
- Website: thenecks.com

The Necks are an Australian avant-garde jazz trio formed in 1987 by founding mainstays Chris Abrahams on piano and Hammond organ, Tony Buck on drums, percussion and electric guitar, and Lloyd Swanton on bass guitar and double bass. They play long improvisation pieces of up to over an hour in length that explore the development and demise of repeating musical figures characteristic of the New York school of long-form minimal music as practiced by La Monte Young, Terry Riley, Steve Reich and Rhys Chatham; they also incorporate the free improvisation jazz music of Cecil Taylor.

Their double LP studio album Unfold was named by Rolling Stone as "one of the top 20 avant albums of 2017." In 2020, the Necks were listed at number 49 in Rolling Stone Australia's "50 Greatest Australian Artists of All Time" issue.

The Boys (The Necks album) was inducted into National Songbook on Nov 4 2026 by the National Film and Sound Archive .

== History ==
The Necks were formed in 1987 in Sydney by Chris Abrahams on piano and Hammond organ, Tony Buck on drums, percussion and electric guitar, and Lloyd Swanton on bass guitar and double bass. In 1983 Abrahams (ex-Laughing Clowns) on keyboards and Swanton on bass guitar were founders of the Benders, a jazz group, with Dale Barlow and Jason Morphett on saxophones, and Louis Burdett on drums; which disbanded in 1985.

Abrahams had formed the Sparklers in 1985, a dance pop band, with Bill Bilson on drums (ex-Sunnyboys), Gerard Corben on guitar (ex-Lime Spiders), Ernie Finckh on guitar, Melanie Oxley on lead vocals (ex-Sweet Nothing), and her older brother Peter Oxley on bass guitar (ex-Sunnyboys). Abrahams left in 1987 before that group's first album, Persuasion (October 1988). Buck had been a member of a number of groups: Great White Noise (1983), Women and Children First, Tango Bravo and Pardon Me Boys; prior to forming the Necks. In 1986 Swanton had been a member of Dynamic Hepnotics.

According to Australian musicologist, Ian McFarlane, the Necks "issued several albums of abstract, improvised, jazzy mood music." François Couture of AllMusic described how they "usually start playing a very basic melodic and rhythmic figure, and then keep going at it for an hour, gradually introducing microscopic changes and variations. Some critics have compared them to Krautrock groups like Can and Faust. Others find similarities in the works of minimalist composers like LaMonte Young, Tony Conrad, even Philip Glass." The band has been described as "offending (successfully) against tradition for the past quarter of a century, [doing so] mostly by occupying the spaces between accepted positions and obstinately refusing to obey genre rules".

The group issued their debut album, Sex on the Spiral Scratch label in 1989. It consists of a single track of the same name, which is just under an hour long. Couture noticed that "The difference between Sex and the many other CDs they would record afterwards is the purity: The trio's hypnotic repetitive piece relies only on piano, bass, and drums; no electronics, extra keyboards, samples, or lengthy introduction."

Aside from their work within the group each member has undertaken side projects, recording session work or as a touring band musician. Abrahams formed an ongoing duo with Melanie Oxley (1989–2003), which has released four "moody, emotive soul/pop albums" from Welcome to Violet (October 1992) to Blood Oranges (April 2003). All three have worked for Stephen Cummings, both collectively and individually.

=== Live performance ===
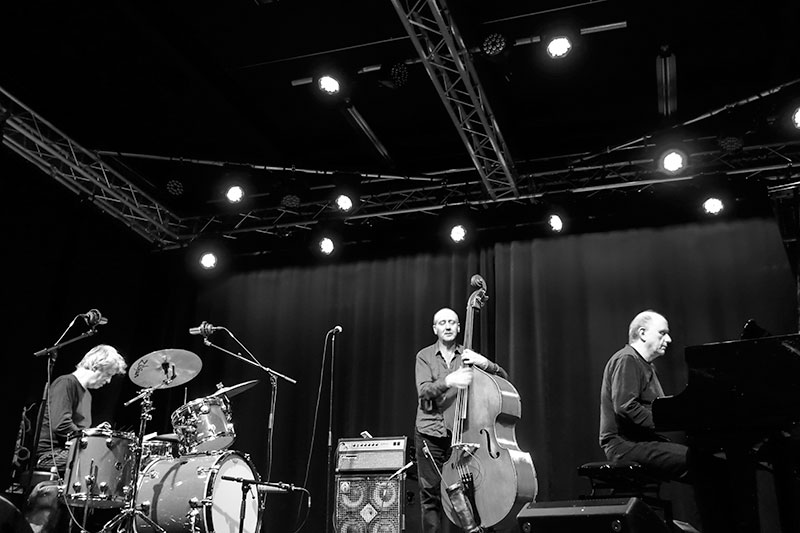
Buck, Swanton and Abrahams performing in Aarhus, Denmark, November 2015

The Necks performances are always improvised, with the instrumentation of piano, double bass, and drums/percussion (with the occasional exception, e.g., when Chris Abrahams played the Melbourne Town Hall pipe organ instead of piano). Geoff Winston of London Jazz News described how "Each performance by [the Necks] begins with a blank page which one of the trio will start to fill in to commence the journey, an uninterrupted set of around forty to sixty minutes. There are no rules, no agreements about who will take that lead and about how the discourse will evolve. The only criteria that apply are those of their own impeccably high standards." Typically a live performance will begin very quietly with one of the musicians playing a simple figure. One by one, the other two will join with their own contributions–all three players independent yet intertwined. As the 'piece' builds through subtle micro-changes, the interaction of their instruments creates layers of harmonics and prismatic washes of sound that lead some to apply the genre label 'trance jazz'.

The Quietus' Kate Hennessy found that "any Necks' show is a make or break experience. Some find it cathartic, others buckle and ever the twain shall chafe in the washout. The trio's routine is to play two improvised sets using just piano, double bass and drums: one set relatively calm; the other dispensing sound of escalating intensity for a long hour. Jazz by name but not by nature – if jazz denotes songs that spark at intervals into fine displays of musicianship and tricky timing, after which one claps, drinks, and feels pretty good about the world and the talent in it. No, The Necks plunge listeners to the kinds of violent psychological depths few other bands can achieve at all, let alone all acoustically."

=== Studio albums ===
Studio albums by The Necks are also based on improvisations, but the recording process can involve multiple takes and sections which are then edited together into a single composition. Studio recordings often involve extra instrumentation beyond the core piano, bass and drums, including samples, organ (Abrahams), electric guitar (Buck) and appearances by guest musicians.

The Necks have never attempted live performance of studio recordings. When they were approached to perform their debut album Sex as part of a series of "classic albums" concerts Chris Abrahams pointed out "That's not how we make music. It would make no sense."

== Soundtracks ==
Their soundtrack for The Boys (1998) was nominated for ARIA Best Soundtrack Album, AFI Best Musical Score and Australian Guild of Screen Composers Award. In November 2026 it was inducted into the National Songbook by the National Film and Sound Archive.They have also recorded soundtracks for What's The Deal? (1997) and In the Mind of the Architect (three one-hour ABC-TV documentaries, 2000).

== Members ==
- Chris Abrahams – piano, Hammond organ (1987–present)
- Tony Buck – drums, percussion (also programming, samples, electric guitar) (1987–present)
- Lloyd Swanton – bass guitar, double bass (1987–present)

== Discography ==
=== Studio albums ===
- Sex (Spiral Scratch, 1989)
- Next (Spiral Scratch, 1990)
- Aquatic (Fish of Milk/Shock, 1994)
- Silent Night (Fish of Milk/Shock, 1996)
- Hanging Gardens (Fish of Milk/Shock/ReR Megacorp, 1999)
- Aether (Fish of Milk/Shock/ReR Megacorp, 2001)
- Drive By (Fish of Milk/Shock/ReR Megacorp, 2003)
- Mosquito/See Through (Fish of Milk/ReR Megacorp, 2004)
- Chemist (Fish of Milk/Shock/ReR Megacorp, 2006)
- Silverwater (Fish of Milk/ReR Megacorp, 2009)
- Mindset (Fish of Milk/ReR Megacorp, 2011)
- Open (Fish of Milk/ReR Megacorp, 2013)
- Vertigo (Fish of Milk/ReR Megacorp, 2015)
- Unfold (Ideologic Organ, 2017)
- Body (Fish of Milk/Northern Spy, 2018)
- Three (Fish of Milk/Northern Spy/ReR Megacorp, 2020)
- Travel (Northern Spy, 2023)
- Bleed (Northern Spy, 2024)
- Disquiet (Northern Spy, 2025)

=== Live albums ===
- Piano Bass Drums (Fish of Milk/Shock, 1998)
- Athenaeum, Homebush, Quay & Raab (Fish of Milk/Shock, 2002)
- Photosynthetic (Long Arms, 2003)
- Townsville (Fish of Milk/ReR Megacorp, 2007) live album, recorded on 15 February 2007 live in concert at the Riverway Arts Centre in Thuringowa City, Northern Queensland.
- Live in Berlin (memory stick video, 2019)

=== Soundtrack albums ===
- The Boys (original soundtrack) (Wild Sound/MDS, 1998)
- Strade Trasparenti (Staubgold/2011)

=== Other appearances ===
- "Royal Family" on Beyond El Rocco (Vox, 1993) – soundtrack to Kevin Lucas' documentary on Australian Jazz
- "Chemist" (live performance) on Highlights From The ABC TV Series Studio 22 (ABC Music, 2002)
- "Hall" on split-single 7" with Hards-Ons (We Empty Rooms, WER#25, 2014)
- Drift project by Underworld (2018 - 2019) - appear on "A Very Silent Way", "Appleshine Continuum" and "Altitude Dub Continuum"
- Leaving Meaning by Swans (Young God & Mute, 2019) - appear on the songs "Leaving Meaning" and "The Nub"

== Awards and nominations ==
=== APRA Awards ===
The APRA Awards are presented annually from 1982 by the Australasian Performing Right Association (APRA).

Year	Nominee / work	Award	Result
2005	"Drive By" (Lloyd Swanton, Christopher Abrahams, Anthony Buck)	Most Performed Jazz Work	Won
2006	"Chemist" (Swanton, Abrahams, Buck)	Most Performed Jazz Work	Won
2019	"Body" (Chris Abrahams, Tony Buck, Lloyd Swanton)	Song of the Year	Shortlisted

=== ARIA Music Awards ===
The ARIA Music Awards is an annual awards ceremony that recognises excellence, innovation, and achievement across all genres of Australian music. The Necks have won two awards from six nominations.

Year	Nominee / work	Award	Result
1998	The Boys	Best Original Soundtrack/Cast/Show Album	Nominated
2003	Athenaeum, Homebush, Quay & Raab	Best Jazz Album	Nominated
2004	Drive By	Best Jazz Album	Won
2005	Mosquito/See Through	Best Jazz Album	Nominated
2006	Chemist	Best Jazz Album	Won
2010	Silverwater	Best Jazz Album	Nominated

=== Helpmann Awards ===
The Helpmann Awards is an awards show, celebrating live entertainment and performing arts in Australia, presented by industry group Live Performance Australia since 2001. Note: 2020 and 2021 were cancelled due to the COVID-19 pandemic.

Year	Nominee / work	Award	Result	Ref.
2009	FOOD COURT (with Back to Back Theatre)	Best New Australian Work	Nominated	
2009	FOOD COURT (The Necks, Chris Abrahams, Tony Buck & Lloyd Swanton)	Best Original Score	Nominated	

=== National Live Music Awards ===
The National Live Music Awards (NLMAs) are a broad recognition of Australia's diverse live industry, celebrating the success of the Australian live scene. The awards commenced in 2016.

Year	Nominee / work	Award	Result	Ref.
2019	The Necks	Live Jazz Act of the Year	Won	
