= Fabian Hevia =

Australian jazz percussionist

Fabian Hevia is an Australian jazz percussionist. He has played with The Catholics and Vince Jones.

== Discography ==
- 1996 Here's To The Miracles Vince Jones
