= Lloyd Swanton =

Australian jazz double bassist (born 1960)

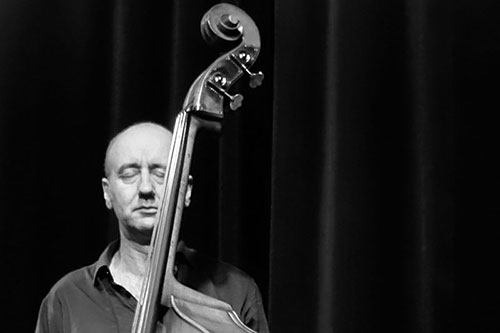
- Swanton performing with The Necks in Aarhus, Denmark in 2015

Background information
- Born: Lloyd Stuart Swanton; August 14, 1960 (age 66); Sydney, New South Wales, Australia
- Genre: Jazz
- Occupations: Musician, composer
- Instruments: Double bass, bass guitar

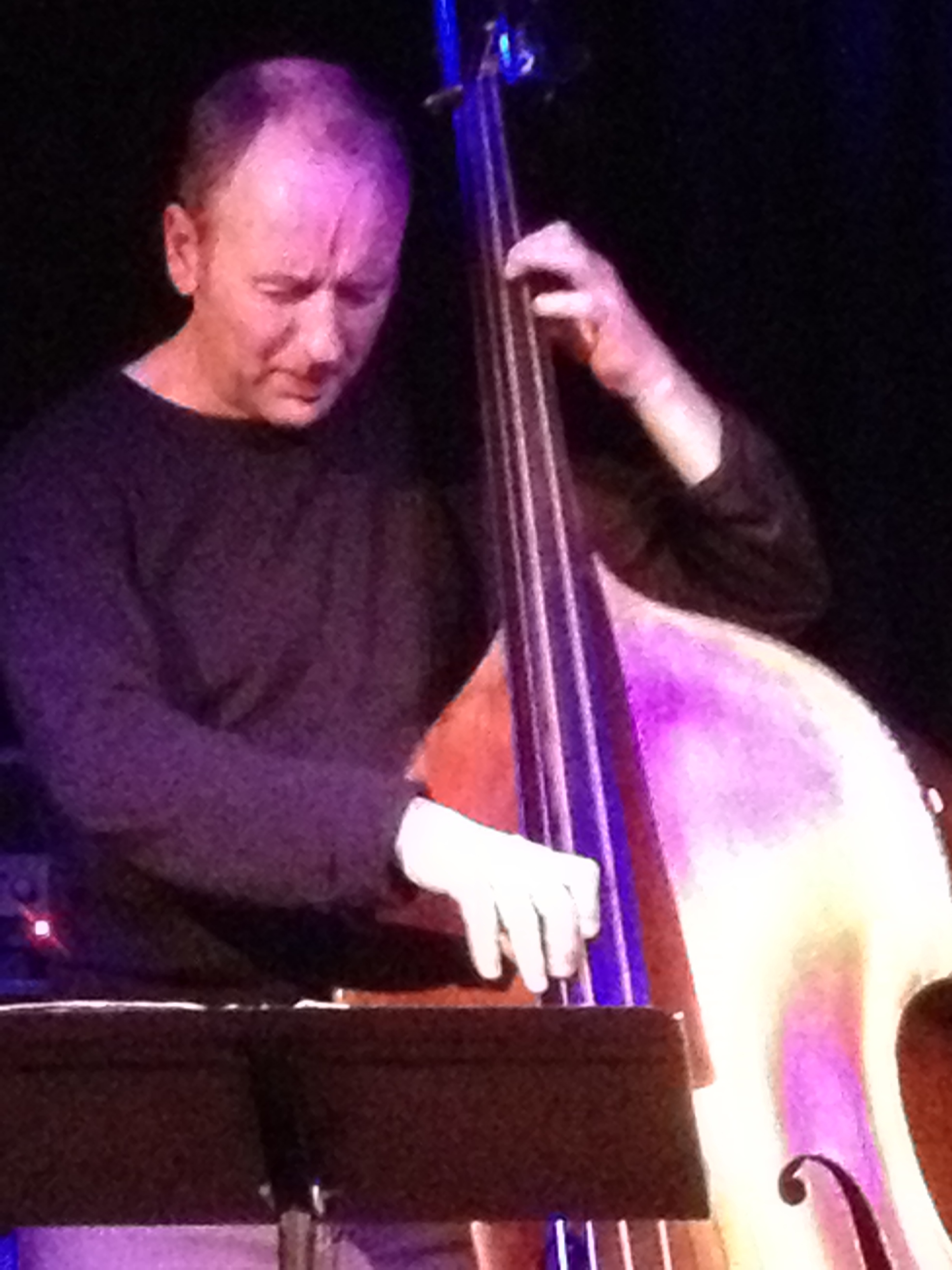
Lloyd Swanton 2012

Lloyd Stuart Swanton (born 14 August 1960) is an Australian jazz double bassist, bass guitarist, and composer.

Swanton was a member of Dynamic Hepnotics in 1986 and co-founded jazz trio The Necks in 1987 with Chris Abrahams and Tony Buck.

== Biography ==
In 1987 he co-founded jazz trio The Necks with Chris Abrahams on keyboards and Tony Buck on drums. In 1991 he formed his own group, The Catholics. He has performed solo improvisation concerts on double bass. Swanton has performed with The Benders, Clarion Fracture Zone, Sydney Symphony, Vince Jones, Alpha Centauri Ensemble, the Mighty Reapers, the Seymour Group, Tim Finn, Stephen Cummings and Wendy Matthews. He was also a long-serving member of the Bernie McGann Trio and the Bernie McGann Quartet.

As well as music for his own bands, Swanton has composed several film soundtracks. For many years Swanton hosted the radio show Mixed Marriage on Eastside Radio in Sydney, a weekly program looking at crossings of jazz with other musical styles.

== Discography ==
=== As leader ===
- Ambon (Bugle, 2015)

With The Benders

- E (Hot, 1983)
- False Laughter (Hot, 1984)
- Distance (Hot, 1985)

With The Catholics

- The Catholics (Rufus, 1992)
- Simple (Rufus, 1994)
- Life on Earth (Rufus/PolyGram, 1997)
- Barefoot (Rufus, 1999)
- Gondola (Rufus, 2006)
- Village (Bugle, 2007)
- Inter Vivos (Bugle, 2009)
- Yonder (Bugle, 2013)

With Clarion Fracture Zone

- What This Love Can Do (Rufus, 1994)
- Less Stable Elements (Rufus, 1996)

With Bernie McGann

- At Long Last (Emanem, 1987)
- Ugly Beauty (Spiral Scratch, 1991)
- McGann (Rufus, 1995)
- Playground (Rufus, 1997)
- Bundeena (Rufus, 2000)
- Double Dutch? (Rufus, 2010)
- Blue for Pablo Too (Rufus, 2005)
- Live at the Side On (Rufus, 2005)
- Solar (Rufus, 2009)
- Wending (Rufus, 2012)

With The Necks

- Sex (Spiral Scratch, 1989)
- Next (Spiral Scratch, 1990)
- Aquatic (Fish of Milk, 1994)
- Silent Night (Fish of Milk, 1996)
- Piano Bass Drums (Fish of Milk, 1998)
- The Boys (Wild Sound/MDS, 1998)
- Hanging Gardens (Fish of Milk, 1999)
- Aether (Fish of Milk, 2001)
- Athenaeum, Homebush, Quay & Raab (Fish of Milk, 2002)
- Drive By (Fish of Milk, 2003)
- Photosynthetic (Long Arms, 2003)
- Mosquito/See Through (Fish of Milk, 2004)
- Chemist (Fish of Milk, 2006)
- Townsville (Fish of Milk, 2007)
- Silverwater (Fish of Milk, 2009)
- Mindset (Fish of Milk, 2011)
- Open (Northern Spy, 2013)
- Vertigo (Fish of Milk, 2015)
- Unfold (Ideologic Organ, 2017)
- Body (Northern Spy, 2018)
- Three (Northern Spy, 2020)
- Bleed (Northern Spy, 2024)

With Alister Spence

- Flux (Rufus, 2003)
- Mercury, (Rufus, 2006)
- Far Flung (Rufus, 2012)
- Live Alister (Spence Music, 2015)
- Not Everything but Enough (Alister Spence Music, 2017)

=== As sideman ===
With Vince Jones

- Trustworthy Little Sweethearts (EMI, 1988)
- Come in Spinner (ABC, 1990)
- One Day Spent (EMI, 1990)
- Future Girl (EMI, 1992)

With others

- Diana Anaid, Diana Ah Naid (Origin, 1997)
- Tony Buck, The Shape of Things to Come (1989)
- Stephen Cummings, Good Humour (Polydor, 1990)
- Dannielle Gaha & Louise Anton, Going for a Song (EastWest, 1997)
- Tim Hopkins, Tim Hopkins' Good Heavens! (Larrikin, 1993)
- Marc Hunter, Night & Day (ABC, 1990)
- Phillip Johnston, Diggin' Bones (Asynchronous, 2018)
- The Last Straw, The Last Straw (Spiral Scratch, 1990)
- Inga Liljestroem, Elk (Groovescooter, 2004)
- Jimmy Little, Resonate Festival (Mushroom, 2001)
- Dave MacRae, Southern Roots (Emanem, 1988)
- Wendy Matthews, Emigre (rooArt, 1990)
- Melanie Oxley & Chris Abrahams, Welcome to Violet (Remote Music, 1992)
- Tim Rollinson, Cause + Effect (Mercury, 1996)
- Phil Slater, The Thousands (Kimnara, 2007)
- Ross Wilson, Dark Side of the Man (WEA, 1989)
- Ross Wilson, Go Bongo Go Wild! (Wild Bongo, 2001)
- Underworld, Drift Episode 2 Atom (Smith Hyde, 2019)
- Wizards of Oz, Soundtrack (Polygram, 1988)
- Iannis Xenakis, Alpha Centauri Ensemble, Roger Woodward, Kraanerg (Etcetera, 1989)
- Julian Curwin, Midnight Lullaby (Romero Records, 2020)

== Awards and nominations ==
=== APRA Awards ===
The APRA Awards are presented annually from 1982 by the Australasian Performing Right Association (APRA).

Year	Nominee / work	Award	Result
2005	"Drive By" (with Chris Abrahams and Tony Buck)	Most Performed Jazz Work	Won
2006	"Chemist" (with Abrahams and Buck)	Most Performed Jazz Work	Won
2019	"Body" (with Abrahams and Buck)	Song of the Year	Shortlisted
