= Miroslav Bukovsky =

Jazz trumpeter and composer

Miroslav Bukovsky (born Czechoslovakia) is one of Australia's leading jazz trumpeters and composer/arrangers.

At the ARIA Music Awards of 1994 Bukovsky won the ARIA Award for Best Jazz Album with the album Wanderlust recorded with his band Wanderlust. Bukovsky has been on staff at the ANU School of Music since 1999. He is a former student of American trumpeter Bill Adam.

== Biography ==
Born in Czechoslovakia, Bukovsky grew up listening to jazz on illegal 'Voice of America' late-night broadcasts. Originally classically trained, he joined various big bands while still living in Czechoslovakia. When the Soviet army invaded his homeland in 1968, Bukovsky, who was then on tour, decided not to return. He migrated to Australia and soon found a place for himself in the Sydney jazz scene. Despite then having only a basic grasp of English, Bukovsky met a number of musicians and quickly made a name for himself jamming with them. It wasn't long before he was playing in such groups as the Daly-Wilson Big Band and Bob Bertle's Moontrane.

Bukovsky co-founded Ten Part Invention with drummer John Pochee and pianist Roger Frampton in 1986, and has been active as a composer for this band. He has also composed for his other bands, including Major Minority, which he formed in 1987, and Wanderlust, formed in 1991. Wanderlust then went on to win the ARIA Award for Best Jazz Album of 1994 with their 1993 self-titled first release, Wanderlust (Rufus Records/Universal).

Bukovsky has been teaching at a university level since the mid-seventies, first at the Sydney Conservatorium of Music and currently at the ANU School of Music, and has influenced many Australian jazz performers such as Phil Slater. Influenced by a wide variety of musicians including Louis Armstrong, Freddie Hubbard, Blue Mitchell, Clifford Brown, Dizzy Gillespie, and Miles Davis, Bukovsky incorporates aspects from all jazz styles into his playing. He has had a long and established career, and has performed with many groups.

== Awards ==
=== ARIA Music Awards ===
The ARIA Music Awards is an annual awards ceremony that recognises excellence, innovation, and achievement across all genres of Australian music. They commenced in 1987.

Year	Nominee / work	Award	Result	Ref.
1994	Wanderlust	Best Jazz Album	Won	

== See also ==
- 20th century brass instrumentalists
- List of trumpeters
- List of jazz trumpeters
- List of jazz arrangers
- List of Australian composers
