= Chris Abrahams =

New Zealand pianist (born 1961)

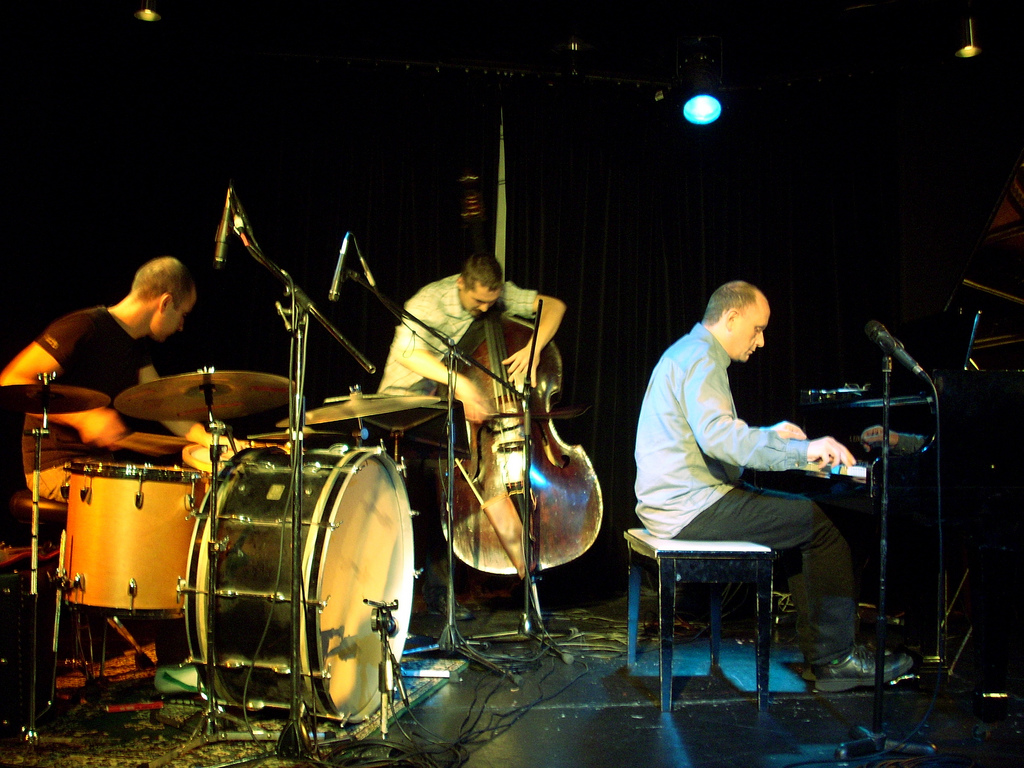
- Abrahams (right) performing with James Waples and Mike Majkowski

Background information
- Born: Christopher Robert Lionel Abrahams; 9 April 1961 (age 65); Oamaru, New Zealand
- Origin: Sydney, New South Wales, Australia
- Genres: Jazz; experimental; krautrock; electronic
- Occupation: Musician
- Instruments: Piano; guitar; keyboards; organ
- Years active: 1980–present
- Labels: Hot/Making Waves; Vegetable/Vitamin; Room40; Vegetable/MGM
- Member of: The Necks

Christopher Robert Lionel Abrahams (born 9 April 1961) is a New Zealand-born, Australian-based musician. He is a founding mainstay member of experimental, jazz trio the Necks (1987–present), collaborated with Melanie Oxley as a soul pop duo (1989–2003), and has issued ten solo albums.

== Biography ==
=== Early years ===
Christopher Robert Lionel Abrahams was born on 9 April 1961 in Oamaru, New Zealand. Abrahams, on keyboards, formed jazz group Benders, in 1980 in Sydney with Dale Barlow on tenor saxophone, Louis Burdett on drums and Lloyd Swanton on bass guitar. By the time Benders disbanded in 1985, Abrahams had performed on all three of their albums, E (1983), False Laughter (1984) and Distance (1985). While still with Benders, late in 1983, he supplied piano for Laughing Clowns' second album, Law of Nature (1984).

=== The Necks, Melanie Oxley & Chris Abrahams ===
The Sparklers were a dance pop group formed in 1985 by Abrahams on keyboards, Bill Bilson on drums (ex-Sunnyboys), Gerard Corben on guitar (ex-Lime Spiders), Ernie Finckh (RenrocRab) on guitar and the Oxley siblings Melanie on lead vocals (ex-Sweet Nothings) and Peter on bass guitar (ex-Sunnyboys). Colin Bloxsom took over lead guitar by the following year. Sparklers released two singles, "Overworking" (October 1986) and "So Often Dreaming" (January 1987) before Abrahams left. The Sparklers issued their debut album, Persuasion, in 1988.

The Necks were formed as a jazz trio, in 1987, by Abrahams on piano, keyboards, organ and guitar with former bandmate, Swanton, on bass guitar and double bass, and Tony Buck on drums, percussion and guitar (ex-Great White Noise). For his compositions with the group he has won two APRA Awards (Australia) for Most Performed Jazz Work; "Drive By" in 2005 and "Mosquito" in 2006. As from March 2020 the trio have issued 16 studio albums. Australian musicologist, Ian McFarlane, described their sonation, "abstract, improvised, jazzy mood music."

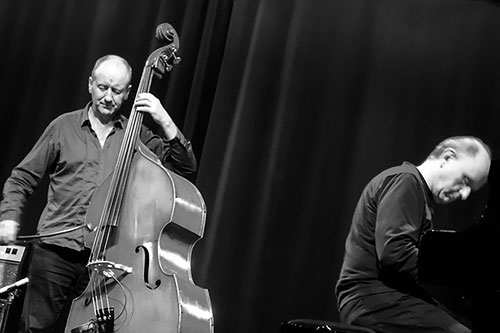
Chris Abrahams (at right) and Lloyd Swanton, on double bass, performing with the Necks (2015) in Aarhus, Denmark

In 1989, while still with the Necks, Abrahams formed a soul pop duo, Melanie Oxley & Chris Abrahams, with former the Sparklers' bandmate, Oxley. They released a four-track extended play (EP), Resisting Calm, via Spiral Scratch in late 1990. For that EP they used Abrahams' current and former bandmates, Buck on drums, Swanton on acoustic bass guitar, Corben (ex-the Sparklers) on guitar as well as Mike Bukovsky on trumpet, Guy Dickerson on guitar, Stuart Eadie on floor toms and Jackie Orszaczky on bass guitar. While periodically collaborating with Abrahams, Oxley maintained her career as a school teacher.

The duo's first two albums, Welcome to Violet (1992) and Coal (1994), were released via Remote Records/MDS. They were labelled as, "moody, emotive soul/pop" works by McFarlane. Their next album, Jerusalem Bay (1998), had Hamish Stuart on drums (ex-Ayers Rock, Wig World, the Catholics) and Mike Bukowski on trumpet (ex-Ten Part Invention). In 2001 the pair performed Abrahams' music for a radio travel documentary, South Island, which was broadcast by ABC Classic FM on 6 October 2003. It was created, narrated and produced by Abrahams with The Listening Room's Sherre DeLys.

Melanie Oxley & Chris Abrahams' next work, Blood Oranges, appeared in early 2003 via Remote Records/Vitamin Records. The Sydney Morning Herald's John Shand found, "his lyrics are often bleaker than their past work, it is not a despairing bleakness, but one bolstered by stoicism, wit, hope and a love of beauty." Jeremy Green of dB Magazine observed, "[it is] peculiarly ineffectual. It paws lazily at classic Motown pop but is totally sedated by dinky production and emotional primness."

=== Solo work ===
Abrahams issued his debut solo album, Piano, in 1985 via Hot Records/Making Waves. It was recorded at Sydney Opera House's Recording Hall and mastered at Studios 301. Tony Mitchell of Cyclic Defrost described this album in 2017, "nine improvisations... it suggests a virtuoso pianist in the making." After leaving the Sparklers, in 1987, he issued his second studio album, Walk.

His fifth solo album, Thrown appeared in 2005 via Room40. Cyclic Defrost's Max Schaefer noticed, "Technically formidable and conceptually refined, [he] pays homage to the piano by drawing it into tightly articulated and highly personalized forms." Abrahams performed, produced and arranged the music for the Australian film, The Tender Hook (2008), which was released as the soundtrack album, The Tender Hook: Motion Picture Soundtrack. At the 2008 Australian Film Institute Awards his work was nominated for Best Original Music Score.

Play Scar (2010), his seventh album, was reviewed by Oliver Laing of Cyclic Defrost, who declared, "[it] is the glorious sound of well-established artist willing to push the boundaries of sound and technique into new realms." His next effort, Memory Night (2013), shows that "even at his most ominous is also quite listenable, creating jumbled, but still quite accessible soundscapes" according to 4ZZZ's Chris Cobroft.

Abrahams has worked as a session musician on albums by the Triffids (Born Sandy Devotional, 1986), Ed Kuepper (Rooms of the Magnificent, 1986; Honey Steel's Gold, 1991; This Is the Magic Mile, 2005), Skunkhour (Skunkhour, 1993), the Apartments (A Life Full of Farewells, 1995; Apart, 1997; In and Out of the Light, 2020), the Church (Magician Among the Spirits, 1996), the Whitlams (Eternal Nightcap, 1997; Torch the Moon, 2002), Silverchair (Neon Ballroom, 1999), Midnight Oil (The Real Thing, 2000) and Wendy Matthews (Beautiful View, 2001).

== Musical style and composing ==
Some of Abrahams' music is experimental in nature—The Necks are an improvisational trio, and Abraham's performance at the Room40 Tenth Anniversary in London was labelled "ambient", "free-jazz" and "industrial noise" by (UK) Financial Times reviewer, Mike Hobart. Chris Reid of RealTime magazine wrote of his Germ Studies collaboration with Clare Cooper, an organiser of the NOWnow Festival who played the Chinese zither on the album, that "it represents an extensive investigation into the endless range of sounds that can be created by combining the venerable DX7 synthesiser and the even more venerable Chinese zither, the guzheng [...] a deep exploration of musical language".

== Discography ==
=== Albums ===
Title	Album details
Piano	Released: 1985; Label: Hot Records (HOT 1014); Format: LP; Note: Recorded at the Sydney Opera House
Walk	Released: 1987; Label: Hot Records (HOT 1025); Format: LP, CD; Note: Recorded at the Sydney Opera House
Welcome to Violet (with Melanie Oxley)	Released: October 1992; Label: Remote Music (Rem 1); Format: CD
Coal (with Melanie Oxley)	Released: October 1994; Label: Remote Music (Rem 2); Format: CD
Jerusalem Bay (with Melanie Oxley)	Released: December 1998; Label: Remote Music (Rem 4); Format: CD
Glow	Released: May 2001; Label: Vegetable Records (VEGE001); Format: CD
Blood Oranges (with Melanie Oxley)	Released: April 2003; Label: Remote Music (Rem 5); Format: CD, digital
Streaming	Released: 2003; Label: Vegetable Records (VEGE002); Format: 2xCD, digital
Artery (with Jon Rose, and Clayton Thomas)	Released: 2003; Label: the NOW now (cd002); Format: CD, digital
Thrown	Released: 2005; Label: Room40 (RM409); Format: 2xCD, digital
Oceanic Feeling Like (with Mike Cooper)	Released: 2008; Label: Room40 (RM420); Format: CD, digital
The Tender Hook: Motion Picture Soundtrack	Released: 2008; Label: Vitamin Records (VT0043); Format: CD, digital
Germ Studies (with Clare Cooper)	Released: 2009; Label: Splitrec (Splitrec19); Format: 2×CD, digital
Play Scar	Released: 2010; Label: Room40 (RM437); Format: CD, digital
None of Them Would Remember It That Way (with Lucio Capece)	Released: March 2012; Label: Mikroton Recordings (mikroton cd 13); Format: CD
None of Them Would Remember It That Way (with Alessandro Bosetti)	Released: 2012; Label: Mikroton Recordings (mikroton cd 19); Format: CD
Kopfüberwelle (with Sabine Vogel)	Released: December 2012; Label: absinthRecords (absinthRecords 024); Format: CD
Memory Night	Released: 2013; Label: Room40 (RM453); Format: CD, digital
Gardenier (with Magda Mayas)	Released: 2013; Label: Relative Pitch Records (RPR1011); Format: CD
Luv / Kopfüberwelle (with Sabine Vogel)	Released: 2014; Label: Another Timbre (at76); Format: CD; Note: As part of The Berlin Series
Fluid to the Influence	Released: April 2016; Label: Room40 (RM464); Format: CD, LP, digital
Climb	Released: 2016; Label: Vegetable Records (VEGE003); Format:
Peggy (with Jon Rose)	Released: 2018; Label: ReR Megacorp (RER JRCA); Format: CD
Sink (with Arthur Rother, Andrea Ermke, Marcello Silvio Busato)	Released: 2019
Next to Nothing (with Ignaz Schick)	Released: July 2020; Label: Zarek (ZORA14); Format: Digital
Appearance	Released: November 2020; Label: Room40 (RM4132); Format: CD, Digital
Praxis (with Mike Cooper)	Released: December 2020; Label: Room40 (DRM487); Format: Digital
Weft (with Robbie Avenaim and Jim Denley)	Released: July 2021; Label: Relative Pitch Records (RPR 1126); Format: CD, Digital
Words Fail (with Clayton Thomas & Miles Thomas)	Released: September 2021; Label: Hospital Hill (HHLP03210751); Format: 2×LP
Nightjar (with The Vampires)	Released: May 2023; Label: Earshift Music; Format: digital

=== Extended plays ===
Title	EP details
Resisting Calm (with Melanie Oxley)	Released: December 1990; Label: Spiral Scratch (0008); Format: CD, LP

== Awards and nominations ==
=== APRA Awards ===
The APRA Awards are presented annually from 1982 by the Australasian Performing Right Association (APRA).

Year	Nominee / work	Award	Result
2005	"Drive By" (with Lloyd Swanton and Anthony Buck)	Most Performed Jazz Work	Won
2006	"Chemist" (with Swanton and Buck)	Most Performed Jazz Work	Won
2019	"Body" (with Swanton and Buck)	Song of the Year	Shortlisted

=== ARIA Music Awards ===
The ARIA Music Awards are a set of annual ceremonies presented by Australian Recording Industry Association (ARIA), which recognise excellence, innovation, and achievement across all genres of the music of Australia. They commenced in 1987.

Year	Nominee / work	Award	Result	Ref.
1993	Welcome to Violet (with Melanie Oxley)	Best Independent Release	Nominated	
2023	Nightjar (with The Vampires)	Best Jazz Album	Won	

=== Helpmann Awards ===
The Helpmann Awards is an awards show, celebrating live entertainment and performing arts in Australia, presented by industry group Live Performance Australia since 2001. Note: 2020 and 2021 were cancelled due to the COVID-19 pandemic.

Year	Nominee / work	Award	Result	Ref.
2009	FOOD COURT (with Back to Back Theatre and The Necks)	Best New Australian Work	Nominated	
2009	FOOD COURT (The Necks, Chris Abrahams, Tony Buck & Lloyd Swanton)	Best Original Score	Nominated	
