= Tony Buck (musician) =

Australian drummer (born 1962)

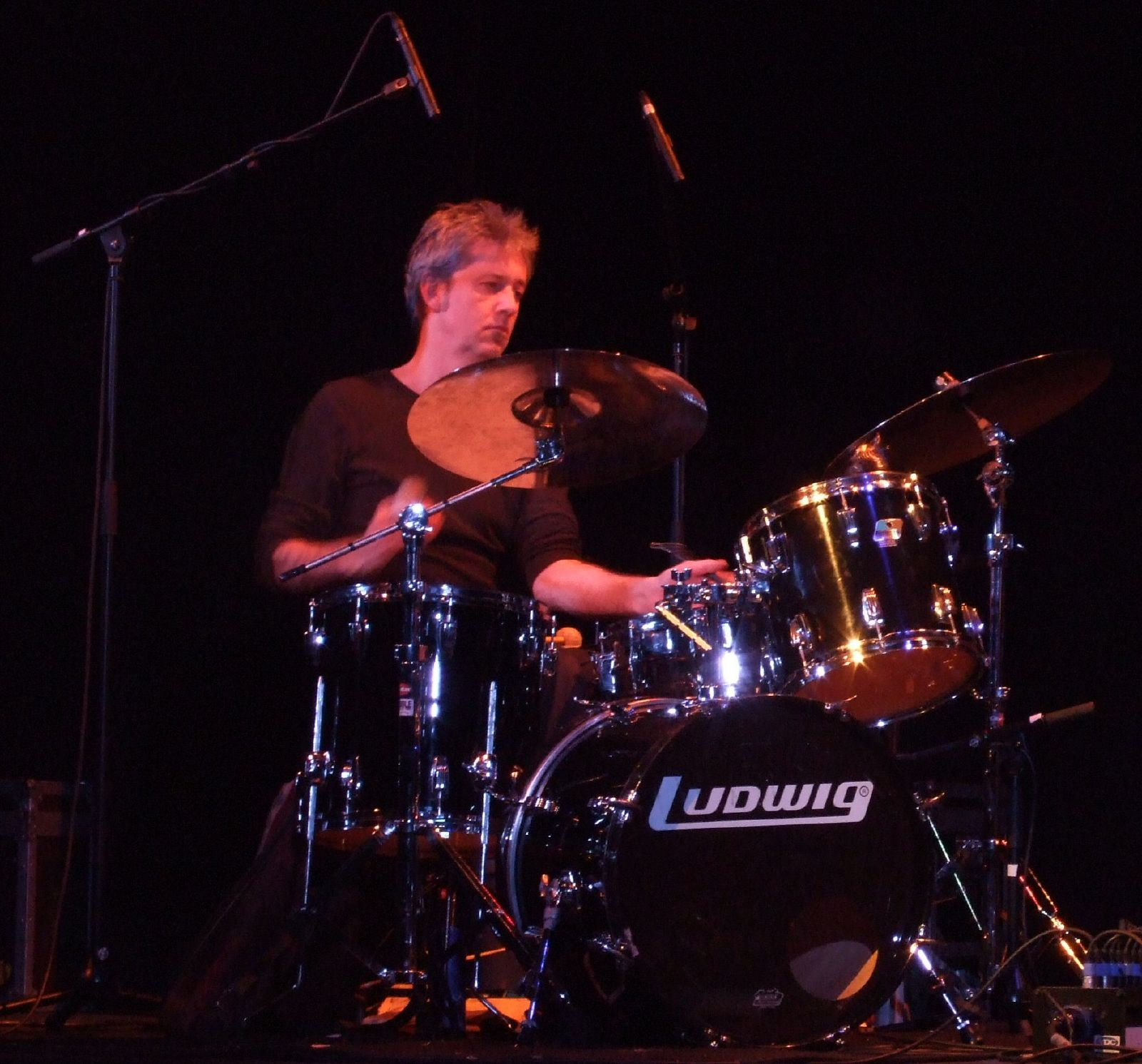
- Buck performing at the LMC 16th Annual Festival of Experimental Music, Cochrane Theatre London on 1 December 2007

Background information
- Born: 1962 (age 63–64); Sydney, New South Wales, Australia
- Genres: Jazz, experimental
- Occupation: Musician
- Instruments: Drums, percussion, guitars, vocals
- Years active: 1980–present

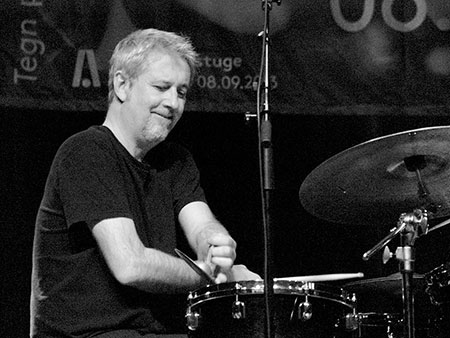
Buck performing in Aarhus, Denmark in 2013

Tony Buck (born 1962) is an Australian drummer and percussionist. He graduated from the New South Wales Conservatorium of Music (now Sydney Conservatorium of Music), becoming involved in the Australian jazz scene.

Buck played in Great White Noise with Michael Sheridan and Sandy Evans during 1983, then Women and Children First with Sandy Evans. He is a founding member of The Necks with Chris Abrahams and Lloyd Swanton since 1987. He is leader of Peril, who he formed in Japan with Otomo Yoshihide and Kato Hideki, and astroPeril. He also formed the short lived L'Beato in the early 1990s, an industrial-oriented outfit reminiscent of Tackhead, which released one EP "The Piston Song".

In the early 1990s, Buck moved from Australia to Amsterdam and later moved to Berlin.

== Discography ==
- The Shape of Things to Come (1989)
- Solo Live (1994)
- Self_contained_underwater_breathing_apparatus
- Projekt Transmit (2009)
- Knoxville (Christian Fennesz / David Daniell / Tony Buck, 2010)
- Flatbosc & Cautery (Frank Gratkowski, Achim Kaufmann, Wilbert De Joode, Tony Buck, NoBusiness 2020)

== Awards and nominations ==
=== APRA Awards ===
The APRA Awards are presented annually from 1982 by the Australasian Performing Right Association (APRA).

Year	Nominee / work	Award	Result
2005	"Drive By" (with Chris Abrahams and Lloyd Swanton)	Most Performed Jazz Work	Won
2006	"Chemist" (with Abrahams and Swanton)	Most Performed Jazz Work	Won
2019	"Body" (with Abrahams and Swanton)	Song of the Year	Shortlisted

== See also ==
- The Necks
