= Roger Beilby =

Australian radio presenter and jazz collector (1946–2026)

Roger Henderson Beilby (1946 – July 2026) was an Australian radio presenter on 3CR Melbourne and jazz collector.

== Life and career ==
Roger Beilby became interested in jazz music in 1963 after he purchased his first jazz record while attending the 18th Australian Jazz Convention.

He co-established the Geelong Jazz Festival in 1967 which ran for eight years.

Beilby became a committee member of the Victorian Jazz Club beginning in the early 1970s, and was later president. As an extension of the jazz club, Beilby presented the radio program Jazz on a Saturday on 3CR beginning in 1976. The program was still running in 2026 with Beilby co-presenting alongside John Smyth, John Trudinger, and Geoff Tobin.

He opened a record store Mostly Jazz in 1982 on St Kilda Road, St Kilda. He ran the shop with Ken Carter and sold items from his own collection. Alongside this, Beilby also organised jazz concerts and produced records for Anteater Records. He opened another record store Mainly Jazz in 1993. He then hosted an online radio program Postcard of Australian Jazz in 1996.

As part of the Australian Jazz Interviews Project, he was interviewed by Tom Wanliss and interviewed John Sangster.

Beilby was later said to have an "all but complete collection of Australian Jazz" featuring many recordings that had never been issued. Among his favourites were The Red Onion Jazz Band, who he had seen live multiple times. He occasionally displayed items from his collection in exhibitions, such as a collection of magazines, photos, posters, records shown at State Library Victoria in 1981 and 1982.

In his later years, Beilby would share items from his archives with fans of Australian jazz on social media. He died July 2026.
