= When Words Fail =

Studio album by Paul Grabowsky Trio
- Released: April 1995
- Venue: ABC Studio 345, Melbourne
- Genre: Jazz

Paul Grabowsky Trio chronology
Six by Three (1989)	When Words Fail (1995)	Angel (1997)

When Words Fail is a studio album by Australian recording jazz trio Paul Grabowsky Trio. The album is the second for the trio of Paul Grabowsky (piano), Gary Costello (bass) and Allan Browne (drums).

At the ARIA Music Awards of 1996, the album won ARIA Award for Best Jazz Album; the second time the trio have won this award.

== Track listing ==
No.	Title	Writer(s)	Length
1.	"When Words Fail"	Paul Grabowsky	6:25
2.	"Isabella's Dance"	Grabowsky	9:23
3.	"Allemande"	Johann Sebastian Bach	4:35
4.	"Play School"	Grabowsky	7:42
5.	"Blau"	Grabowsky	5:08
6.	"Stars Apart"	Grabowsky	5:15
7.	"Embryo"	Grabowsky	7:00
8.	"La Scragga"	Grabowsky	7:52

== Release history ==
Country	Date	Format	Label	Catalogue
Australia	April 1995	CD	ORIGiN Records	OR010
