= Six by Three =

Studio album by Paul Grabowsky Trio
- Released: 1989
- Recorded: 1–2 June 1988
- Venue: Allan Eaton's Melbourne
- Genre: Jazz

Paul Grabowsky Trio chronology
Contact Sport Midnight Waltz (1986)	Six by Three (1989)	When Words Fail (1995)

Six by Three (also known as 6x3) is a studio album by Australian recording jazz trio Paul Grabowsky Trio; although the front cover lists the artists' surname. The album is the first for the trio of Paul Grabowsky (piano), Gary Costello (bass) and Allan Browne (drums).

At the ARIA Music Awards of 1990, the album won ARIA Award for Best Jazz Album.

== Track listing ==
No.	Title	Length
1.	"Three Myths"	12:09
2.	"No Inadequate Words"	5:35
3.	"Colonial Sketch No. 1"	4:55
4.	"Happy Go Lucky Country"	11.22
5.	"Ballad in Search of a Title"	7:26
6.	"Third Generation"	4:25

== Release history ==
Country	Date	Format	Label	Catalogue
Australia	1989	CD	Spiral Scratch	0001
