= Paul Grabowsky Trio =

- Origin: Melbourne, Victoria, Australia
- Genre: Jazz
- Years active: 1983-2001
- Label: OriGin
- Past members: Paul Grabowsky; Sunk Poeschl; Joachim "Rocky" Knauer; Allan Browne; Gary Costello; Nikolaus Schäuble

Paul Grabowsky Trio were an Australian jazz ensemble founded in 1983 by Paul Grabowsky on piano. By 1989 he was joined by Allan Browne on drums and Gary Costello on double bass. They won Best Jazz Album for Six by Three (1989) at the ARIA Music Awards of 1990 and for When Words Fail (1995) in 1996. The trio disbanded in 2001. Gary Costello died in December 2006, aged 54; Browne died in June 2015, aged 70.

== History ==
Paul Grabowsky on piano formed his eponymous trio in 1983 in Melbourne. By 1986 Grabowsky was in Germany and was joined by Joachim "Rocky" Knauer on double bass and Sunk Pöschl on drums. They released their debut album, Contact Sport Midnight Waltz, in that year. It was co-produced by Grabowsky and Pöschl. In 1989 a new trio with Allan Browne on drums (ex-the Red Onion Jazz Band) and Gary Costello on double bass, issued the second album, Six by Three. It won the Best Jazz Album at the ARIA Music Awards of 1990.

The trio's third album When Words Fail was released in April 1995, via Origin Recordings. It also won the ARIA Award for Best Jazz Album, at the ARIA Music Awards of 1996. In 1997 the trio were co-credited with Shelley Scown on the album, Angel. Browne left the ensemble in 1998 and was replaced by Nikolaus Schäuble on drums for their next album, Three (November 2000) (a.k.a. PG3). It was nominated for Best Jazz Album in 2001.

Gary Costello died in December 2006, aged 54. Allan Browne died in June 2015, aged 70.

== Members ==
- Paul Grabowsky – piano (1983–2001)
- Sunk Pöschl – drums (c.1986)
- Joachim "Rocky" Knauer – double bass (c.1986)
- Gary Costello – double bass (1989–2001), deceased 2006
- Allan Browne – drums (1989-c.1998), deceased 2015
- Nikolaus Schäuble – drums (c.1998-2001)

== Discography ==
List of albums
Title	Album details
Contact Sport Midnight Waltz	Released: 1986; Label: Paul Grabowsky; Formats: 12" Vinyl
Six by Three	Released: 1989; Label: Spiral Scratch (0001); Formats: 12" Vinyl
When Words Fail	Released: April 1995; Label: ORIGiN (OR 010); Formats: CD
Angel (Shelley Scown with Paul Grabowsky Trio)	Released: March 1997; Label: ORIGiN (OR 025 ); Formats: CD, Digital download
Three (a.k.a. PG3)	Released: November 2000; Label: ORIGiN; Formats: CD, Digital download

== ARIA Music Awards ==
The ARIA Music Awards are annual awards, which recognises excellence, innovation, and achievement across all genres of Australian music. They commenced in 1987. Paul Grabowsky Trio have won two awards from four nominations.

Year	Nominee / work	Award	Result	Ref.
1990	Six By Three	Best Jazz Album	Won	
1996	When Words Fail	Best Jazz Album	Won	
1998	Angel (with Shelley Scown)	Best Jazz Album	Nominated	
2001	Three	Best Jazz Album	Nominated	

- Note: For awards and nominations for Paul Grabowsky, see his solo article.
