= Mirko Guerrini =

Italian saxophonist and composer (born 1973)

Mirko Guerrini (born 28 April 1973) is an Italian-Australian jazz saxophonist, composer and arranger.

== Biography ==
Mirko Guerrini was born in Florence, Italy. Has studied piano, saxophone, classical composition and jazz music at the Conservatorio “Cherubini” in Florence, as well as Jazz saxophone with Dave Liebman in New York.

A multi-instrumentalist, composer and orchestra conductor, he has 20 albums to his credit as a solo sax player and leader of jazz ensembles, more than 50 CDs as a sideman. He is now leading the band 'Mirko Guerrini Horizontal Quartet' (Andrea Keller, Tamara Murphy and Niko Schäuble) and he is also the co-leader of the band 'Torrio!' with Paul Grabowsky and Niko Schauble.

Guerrini has released six books: two with a selection of his compositions by the well known label Carisch Ed, and three educational books dedicated to the Jazz Tenor Saxophone: Stan Getz, Joe Henderson and Oliver Nelson.

He was part of the "blockbuster" project Carioca with Stefano Bollani (CD and DVD released with over 80.000 copies sold), and has toured three times in Italy with more than 50 concerts. In two of them Caetano Veloso has joined the band.

Guerrini hosted the radio show Dottor Djembè together with the comedian David Riondino and the jazz superstar Stefano Bollani. The radio program was aired on the Italian national radio channel Radio3. The program won several awards, and went on for six years with over 180 shows produced.

He has had collaborations: with Billy Cobham, Brian Auger, Mark Feldman, Stefano Bollani, Enrico Rava, Stefano Battaglia, Paul McCandless, Caetano Veloso, Hermeto Pascoal, Paul Grabowsky, Tony Gould, Niko Schauble, Andrea Keller, Monash Art Ensemble, as far as jazz is concerned, with singers-songwriters such as Ivano Fossati and Giorgio Gaber and with a number of other artists in Italy and abroad.

He is also in demand as a composer/conductor with different Symphony Orchestras (Orchestra "A.Toscanini" of Parma, Orchestra Regionale Toscana, Orchestra della Campania and others), being the winner of International Music Competitions such as the "Concorso 2 Agosto di Bologna" (2000, 2005).

In Australia, Guerrini composed the music commissioned by the Melbourne Museum for their Aztecs Exhibition, producing all the music for both TV ads and live performances.

In 2019, Guerrini composed and produced the soundtrack for the stop motion VR movie The Passenger, who was finalist at the Mostra Internazionale del cinema di Venezia.

He has performed in many countries such as Brasil, Japan, Australia, Canada, Usa, France, Spain, Russia, Finland, Indonesia and in many other countries.

As an educator, Guerrini was a professor of Jazz Saxophone and Small Jazz Ensemble at the Conservatorio "Mascagni" in Livorno.

Since he permanently moved to Australia in 2013 he started teaching in Melbourne. Guerrini is now Adjunct Fellow and Teaching Associate at Monash University, and a teacher in several different colleges.

Has been invited as visiting professor at UTAS in Hobart in Australia as well as at the Banff Centre for Performing Arts in Canada (2010, 2012), and has been the Keynote speaker at a Conference on “Musical Perspectives” at the Warwick University, in Warwick, England in 2012.

Together with Niko Schäuble he also started the educational project expEARience, based on the importance of listening and the auditory process.

== Discography ==
=== As a leader ===
Year	Title	Label	Personnel
2020	Two Too Many	Mirko Guerrini Music	With Daniele Mencarelli (bass), Stefano Tamborrino (drums)
2020	Horizontal Quartet	Mirko Guerrini Music	With Tamara Murphy (double bass), Andrea Keller (piano), Niko Schäuble (drums)
2020	Harvest Moon on Friday 13th	Mirko Guerrini Music	With Tony Gould (piano), Ilaria Crociani (voice), Frank Di Sario (double bass)
2020	Genuinely Radiosuccessi	Mirko Guerrini Music	With Ilaria Crociani (voice), Ryan Griffith (guitars, clarinet), Tom Lee (double bass), Niko Schäuble (drums)
2017	Torrio!	Encore Jazz	Co-leader with Paul Grabowsky (piano), Niko Schäuble (drums)
2016	Mister Amore	Mirko Guerrini Music	With Ilaria Crociani (voice), Ryan Griffith (guitars, clarinet), Mark Elton (double bass), Carlo Alberto Canevali (drums), Niran Dasika (trumpet), Eric Budd (trombone)
2016	Sardinian Liturgy	Jazzhead	Co-leader with Paolo Angeli (Sardinian guitar), Robert Burke (saxophones, bass clarinet), Jordan Murray (trombone), Stephen Magnusson (guitar), Stefano Tamborrino (drums)
2014	Triodegradable	Mirko Guerrini Music	With Frank Di Sario (double bass), Carlo Alberto Canevali (drums)
2013	Acquacheta	Mirko Guerrini Music	With Stephen Magnusson (guitar, co-leader), Frank Di Sario (double bass), Niko Schäuble (drums)
2010	Divagazioni su 319 corde	Carisch	With Stefano Bollani (piano), Daniele Mencarelli (bass) Orchestra della Toscana
2009	Il Bianco e l'Augusto	Emarcy - Universal	With Mauro Grossi (piano), Saverio Tasca (vibraphone, marimba), Daniele Mencarelli (double bass), Paolo Corsi (drums)
2008	Swinging Prato	Calliope	With Millennium Bugs' Orchestra, Ilaria Crociani, Lorenzo Bigabli, Gianna Grazzini, Titta Nesti, Irene Grandi, Claudia Tellini, Massimo Altomare (voices)
2007	Italian Lessons	Giotto Music	With Stefano Bollani (piano), Daniele Mencarelli (bass) Solisti di Perugia (strings)
2006	Cirko Guerrini	Giotto Music	With Mauro Grossi (piano), Saverio Tasca (vibraphone, marimba), Daniele Mencarelli (double bass), Paolo Corsi (drums), Riccardo Tesi (organetto), Rudy Migliardi (trombone)
2004	L'attuale jungla	Mescal	With Marco Parente (Co-leader, voice, song-writing), Millennium Bugs Orchestra
2002	Oliver Nelson: composer & arranger	Il popolo del blues	With Alberto Marsico (Hammond organ), Mario Piacentini (piano Fender), Anthony Paule (guitar), Fabrizio Berti (harmonica), Ilaria Crociani (voice), Millennium Bugs' Orchestra
2001	I Diavoli del ritmo	Philology	With Stefano Bollani (piano), Raffaello Pareti (double bass), Walter Paoli (drums)
2001	Come fiori in mare	Lilium	With Millennium Bugs Orchestra
1995	Tornando a casa	Modern Times	With Stefano Bollani (piano), Riccardo Onori (guitar), Sergio Gistri (trumpet), Nico Vernuccio (double bass), Andrea Melani (drums), Mauro Volpini (accordion)
1995	Summertime in Jazz	Splash(h)	With Andrea Pasi (accordion), Nico Vernuccio (double bass), Alessio Riccio (drums)

== Awards ==
Year	Title	Place
2020	Dean's Sessional Commendations for "contributions to innovation and excellence in teaching"	Monash University, Melbourne, Australia
2020	Halo Award for the Best Fiction Movie with the VR movie “Passenger” for which Mirko Guerrini composed the music.	Amsterdam, Holland
2020	VRE Award for the Best VR Movie with “Passenger” for which Mirko Guerrini composed the music	Rome, Italy
2013	Paul D. Fleck Fellowship	Banff Centre for Performing Arts, Banff, Canada
2010	“Crystal Microphone for best Radio Show” for the radio show "Il Dottor Djembè"	Radio Rai 3, Italy
2009	“Satire Prize for best Radio Show” for the radio show "Il Dottor Djembè"	Forte dei Marmi, Italy
2005	Best Jazz Composition for Symphony Orchestra at the "International Composition Competition 2 Agosto"	Bologna, Italy
2000	Best Jazz Composition for Symphony Orchestra at the "International Composition Competition 2 Agosto"	Bologna, Italy
1998	Selected as the Italian representative for the first Tenor Sax chair with the European Jazz Youth Orchestra	Copenhagen, Denmark
1995	Prize at the international completion for small jazz ensembles “Summertime in Jazz”	Prato, Italy

=== Music Victoria Awards ===
The Music Victoria Awards are an annual awards night celebrating Victorian music. They commenced in 2006.

Year	Nominee / work	Award	Result	Ref.
Music Victoria Awards of 2017	Torrio! (With Paul Grabowsky & Niko Schäuble)	Best Jazz Album	Nominated	
