= 1992 Australia Day Honours =

The 1992 Australia Day Honours are appointments to various orders and honours to recognise and reward good works by Australian citizens. The list was announced on 25 January 1992 by the Governor General of Australia, Bill Hayden.

The Australia Day Honours are the first of the two major annual honours lists, the first announced to coincide with Australia Day (26 January), with the other being the Queen's Birthday Honours, which are announced on the second Monday in June.

† indicates an award given posthumously.

== Order of Australia ==
=== Companion (AC) ===
==== General Division ====
| Recipient | Citation | Notes |
|---|---|---|
| Sir James Schofield Balderstone | For service to primary industry and business and commerce | |
| Emeritus Professor Noel George Butlin | For service to education, particularly in the study of economic growth | |
| Cardinal Edward Bede Clancy AO | For service to religion, learning and to the disadvantaged in the community | |
| Professor David Roderick Curtis | For service to medicine and science, particularly in the fields of research and administration | |
| Maxwell Spencer Dupain OBE | For service to the visual arts, particularly through photography | |
| Dame Phyllis Irene Frost DBE | For service to the community, particularly as Chairperson, Victorian Relief Committee and Chairperson, The Victorian Women's Prison Council | |
| Justice Anthony Murray Gleeson AO | For service to the law and to the Crown | |
| Sir Rupert (James) Hamer KCMG ED | For service to the Arts, particularly as Chairman of the Victoria State Opera, and to the community | |
| Mr Justice David Kingsley Malcolm QC | For service to law and to the Crown | |
| Barry Emmanuel Tuckwell OBE | For service to music, particularly as a performer on the French horn | |

==== Military Division ====
| Branch | Recipient | Citation | Notes |
|---|---|---|---|
| Navy | Vice Admiral Alan Lee Beaumont AO | For service to the Australian Defence Force, particularly as Vice Chief of the Defence Force | |
| Army | Lieutenant General Henry John Coates AO, MBE | For service to the Australian Army, particularly as Chief of the General Staff | |

=== Officers (AO) ===
==== General Division ====
| Recipient | Citation | Notes |
|---|---|---|
| Phillip Andrew Adams AM | For service to the Australian film and television industries | |
| Thea Beatrice May Astley, AM | For service to Australian literature | |
| Professor Peter Erne Baume | For service to the Australian Parliament | |
| Professor Maureen Brunt | For service to the Trade Practices Tribunal and to education | |
| Donald Frederick Darben | For service to development in the Northern Territory | |
| Donald Bruce Dawe | For service to Australian literature, particularly in the field of poetry | |
| Professor John Robert de Laeter | For service to science education | |
| Ian Maxwell Dickenson | For service to primary industry, particularly forestry | |
| John Robert Arthur Dowd | For service to the NSW parliament | |
| Peter Dunn, AM | For services to international relations | |
| Lindsay Edward Fox | For service to the transport industry and to the community | |
| Arthur Thomas Gietzelt | For service to the Australian Parliament and to local government | |
| Donald James Grimes | For service to the Australian Parliament and to international relations | |
| Eula Margaret Guthrie | For service to education and to the community | |
| Cynthia Ann Johnston | For service to the performing arts particularly through the Australian Opera and the young artist development programme | |
| Professor Allen Kerr | For service to science, particularly to plant pathology | |
| Emeritus Professor Henry Oliver Lancaster | For service to mathematical sciences and to education | |
| Diana Marguerite Large | For service to the performing arts particularly in Tasmania, and to religion | |
| Peter Maxwell Laurance | For service to the tourist industry and to children with physical disabilities | |
| Emeritus Professor Ian Calder Lewis | For service to medicine and education, particularly in the field of child health | |
| Professor Ts'un-yan Liu | For service to education, particularly in the field of Chinese studies | |
| Ian Malcolm Macphee | For service to the Australian Parliament | |
| Aileen Mary Monck | For service to nursing, particularly in the field of education and administration | |
| Adrian Herbert Monsbourgh | For service to music, particularly jazz as a performer and composer | |
| James Fulton Muir | For service to commerce and to the community | |
| Hugo Brian O'Keefe | For service to civil aviation, particularly international civil aviation | |
| Emeritus Professor Ralph Whaddon Parsons | For service to education and to scientific research | |
| Leslie Marsh Perrott, OBE | For service to town planning and to the community | |
| James Stewart Ramsay | For service to the arts, particularly the Art Gallery of South Australia and the Australian Ballet and to the community | |
| Diana May Ramsay | For service to the arts, particularly the Art Gallery of South Australia and the Australian Ballet and to the community | |
| Godfrey Alfred Rattigan, CBE | For public service | |
| John Saunders, AM | For service to the community and to children with disabilities | |
| Professor Ainslie Glenister Ross Sheil | For service to the field of surgery, particularly in clinical and research organ transplantation | |
| Jean Enid Skuse, MBE | For service to religion, particularly through the World Council of Churches, and to women's affairs | |
| George Ivan Smith | For service to international relations | |
| Leonard George Teale | For service to the performing arts and to the community | |
| Professor John Ross Turtle | For service to endocrinology and to education | |
| Professor David Ogilvie White | For service to education, particularly in the field of microbiology | |
| Dr Murray Gowan Williams | For service to adolescent health | |

==== Military Division ====
| Branch | Recipient | Citation | Notes |
|---|---|---|---|
| Navy | Commodore Donald Bruce Chalmers | For distinguished service as Commander of the First Royal Australian Navy Gulf Task Group | |
| Navy | Commodore Christopher John Oxenbould | For distinguished service as Commander of the Royal Australian Navy Task Group both during and after the Gulf War | |
| Navy | Rear Admiral Rodney Graham Taylor, AM | For service to the Australian Defence Force (Operations), Headquarters Australian Defence Force during the Middle East Gulf conflict | |
| Navy | Rear Admiral Robert Andrew Kevin Walls | For service to the Royal Australian Navy, particularly as Director General Naval Policy and Maritime Doctrine | |
| Army | Major General Peter Maurice Arnison | For service to the Australian Army as the Commander of the 1st Division | |
| Army | Brigadier Iain Gordon Angus Macinnis | For service to the Australian Army as Director General of Co-ordination and Organisation | |
| Air Force | Air Vice Marshal the Hon Mr Justice Alastair Bothwick Nicholson | For service to the Royal Australian Air Force as Judge Advocate General of the Australian Defence Force | |
| Air Force | Air Commodore Kenneth Roger Blakers | For service to the Royal Australian Air Force as the inaugural Air Officer Commanding Training Command | |

=== Member (AM) ===
==== General Division ====
| Recipient | Citation | Notes |
|---|---|---|
| James Barnes | For service to Rugby League as a player and administrator | |
| Patrick Joseph Barrett | For service to public administration | |
| Dr Hugh Collis Barry | For service to medicine, particularly in the field of orthopaedic surgery | |
| James Beggs | For service to industrial relations | |
| John Benedek | For service to international trade, particularly in Eastern Europe | |
| Professor Richard Clayton Bennett | For service to medicine, particularly as a surgeon | |
| Edward Peter Benson | For service to community health | |
| Anthony Richard Berg | For service to the arts, particularly in the field of music administration | |
| Beatrice Caroline Brown | For service to sculpture and to arts administration | |
| Professor Arthur Alexander Brownlea | For service to community health | |
| Oscar Elton Butcher | For service to conservation and to the meat industry | |
| Emeritus Professor Alexander John Carmichael, CBE | For service to education | |
| Charles Stanley Chambers, MBE | For services to social welfare, particularly through the Sydney City Mission and Mission Australia | |
| Helena Patricia Chaplin | For service to people with intellectual disabilities | |
| Donald Ernest Cameron Charlwood | For service to literature | |
| John David Chesterman | For service to town planning | |
| Dr Donald Stewart Child | For service to medical administration | |
| Patricia Hazel Clancy | For service to the law, particularly in the field of family law | |
| John Kevin Clarebrough, OBE | For service to medicine, particularly in the field of cardio-thoracic surgery | |
| Professor Arthur Colvin Lindesay Clark | For service to paediatric education and to the Royal Australasian College of Physicians | |
| Leslie Edward Clarke | For service to the community through the design of schools which incorporate community facilities | |
| June Francis Cochrane | For service to nursing | |
| Reginald Thomas Cole | For service to industrial relations | |
| Professor Hal John Hester Colebatch | For service in the fields of respiratory medicine and research | |
| Professor John Kieran Collins | For service to psychology and research on Australian youth | |
| Everald Ernest Compton | For service to the community, particularly in the field of professional fund raising | |
| Brian Henty Connor | For service to the community through road safety education and to the Australian College of Road Safety educations and to the Australian College of Road Safety | |
| Gerard Leigh Cramer | For service to education, particularly as Principal of Carey Baptist Grammar School | |
| Manfred Douglas Cross | For service to the Australian Parliament and to the community | |
| Joseph Anthony Dalzell | For service to public health, particularly in the field of orthoptics | |
| Reginald Frederick Dawson | For service to local government | |
| Margaret McKendrick Dempster | For service to primary education, particularly in the ACT | |
| Quentin Earl Dempster | For service to the media, particularly in the fields of journalism and current affairs | |
| Giovanni Di Fede, BEM | For service to the Italian community | |
| Dr Kiernan John Joseph Dorney, CBE, OBE, DSO | For service to the welfare of the aged and disabled | |
| Susan Kathleen Dow | For service to international relations, particularly through the Save The Children Fund | |
| George Dreyfus | For service to music, particularly as a composer | |
| Lindsay Percival Duthie | For service to international trade | |
| Colin James Egar | For service to cricket administration | |
| Nicholas Campbell Farr-Jones | For service to the sport of Rugby Union football | |
| Sam Fiszman, OAM | For service to the community | |
| Justice John Francis Fogarty | For service to the reform of Australian Family Law and to the Child Support Evaluation Group | |
| Lyal Catherine Fowler | For service to the manufacturing industry, particularly the development of equipment to transport bulk concrete | |
| Malcolm Swanson Fricker | For service to the administration of horse racing | |
| Janette Edith Lockhart Gibson | For service to the community | |
| Angus Duncan MacRae Graham, APM | For service to law enforcement and to correctional services | |
| Dr John MacDonald Falconar Grant, OBE | For service to sport for the disabled | |
| Wilfred James Gray | For service to Aboriginal and Torres Strait Islander affairs | |
| Joyce Greenwood | For service to people with intellectual disabilities | |
| Michael John Hall | For service to the forestry industry | |
| Dr Thomas Hamilton | For service to medicine, particularly accident and emergency care | |
| Professor Gordon Alfred Harrison | For service to medicine, particularly in the field of anaesthetics | |
| Dr Judith Alison Ruth Hay (Mrs Rees) | For service to blood transfusion medicine, particularly serology, and to forensic science | |
| Dr Mervyn Patrick Warwick Hegarty | For service to biochemistry, particularly in the field of plant toxins, and to technical education | |
| Lorraine Shirley Henderson | For service to women's health, particularly through the Endometriosis Association of Victoria | |
| Raymond Hogan | For service to the Trade Union movement | |
| Reverend Barry Russell Hunter | For service to religion | |
| Malcolm Geoffrey Irving | For service to merchant banking and to the community | |
| William James Kirkby-Jones | For service to the housing industry | |
| Maurice James Law | For service to youth, particularly through the Scout Association | |
| Ian Murdoch Leslie | For service to the community, particularly through Foster Parents Plan | |
| Elizabeth Honor Lloyd | For service to international relations | |
| Peter James Lloyd | For service to international relations, particularly to the Australian communities in Iraq and Kuwait | |
| Dr Peter Loveday | For service to education, particularly through the North Australia Research Unit | |
| Ernest Grant Macdonald | For service to industrial relations, training and the community | |
| John Mackenzie | For service to education in the mining industry and to the community | |
| Rosemary Letitia Marriott (Mrs Nichols) | For service to disabled persons through the Merry Makers Performing Group | |
| Richard Wallace Maslen, AFSM | For service to local government and to the community | |
| Ian Richard Mathews | For service to journalism | |
| David James McEwan | For service to the wood industry | |
| John Maxwell McGregor | For service to the community, particularly through the Arthritis Foundation | |
| Sister Maureen May McGuirk | For service to education and administration, particularly as principal of Monte Sant' Angelo Mercy College, North Sydney | |
| Paul Trevor McKay | For service to the Parliament of Tasmania as clerk of the House of Assembly | |
| John Middlin | For service to the mining industry and to the community | |
| Rev Francis James Moloney | For service to religion | |
| Heather Irene Moorhead | For service to early childhood education | |
| Lynette Margaret Mounsey | For service to youth, particularly through the Girl Guides Association | |
| Iain Gordon Murray | For service to sailing and yacht design | |
| Dr Arthur William Musk | For service to respiratory medicine and in the field of asbestos and smoking-related diseases | |
| Dr Gabriel Stephen Nagy | For service to medicine, particularly in the field of gastroenterology | |
| Keith Neighbour | For service to architecture | |
| Robert George Nicol | For service to business and commerce and to the community | |
| John Gilmore Nutt | For service to engineering | |
| John Francis O'Neill | For service to public sector industrial relations | |
| Enzo Gaspare Alessandro Oriolo | For service to industry and commerce | |
| Jozef Stanislaw Ostoja-Kotowski | For service to the visual arts | |
| Dr Preston Ross Patrick | For service to the community as a medical historian | |
| Jill Perryman, MBE | For service to the performing arts | |
| Brian Martin Powell | For service to the conservation of Australian native fauna and flora through management of the natural environment | |
| David Harris Prest | For service to education as principal of Wesley College and through the Association of Heads of Independent Schools of Australia | |
| Dr Elizabeth Maurine Puddy | For service to medicine in the field of child, adolescent and family health | |
| Anthony James Morell Rae | For service to education as headmaster of Newington College and through the Association of Independent Schools | |
| Robin Isobel Rawson, MVO | For service to the development of the Australian system of honours and awards | |
| John Charles Rivett | For service to engineering and to the Institution of Engineers Australia | |
| Professor Alan William Roberts | For service to mechanical engineering, particularly in the fields of bulk handling technology, research and education | |
| James Arthur Roche, OBE | For service to engineering and to the community | |
| Eric Charles Rolls | For service to literature and environmental awareness | |
| Joyce Marie Said | For service to mentally ill people, particularly through the After Care Association of New South Wales | |
| Lawrence Michael Sawle | For service to cricket administration | |
| Kerry Anne Junna-Saxby | For service to athletics | |
| Clifford Gordon Semmler | For service to the wheat industry, Australian Rules football and to the community | |
| Wilma Joyce Shakespear | For service to sports, particularly netball | |
| Gracelyn Joan Smallwood | For service to Aboriginal health and welfare over many years and to public health, particularly in relation to HIV/AIDS | |
| Roger Clitheroe Smith | For service to swimming | |
| Robert Plantagenet Somerset | For service to the cattle industry and to local government | |
| Dr Dean Milton Southwood | For service to medicine, particularly in the field of onto-rhino-laryngology | |
| Norman Spencer | For service to the Advance Australia Foundation, to the television industry and to the community | |
| John Jeffery Tate | For service to the community | |
| Sidney James Taylor | For service to basketball | |
| Dr Richard David Telford | For service to sport and sports science | |
| Peter Francis Thorley | For service to local government and to the community | |
| Berwick Carlyon Tonkin | For service to engineering and to the community | |
| Ian Anthony Trewhella | For service to the welfare of, and sport and recreation for, persons with disabilities | |
| Rev John Corcoran Wallis | For service to religion | |
| Cyril Ralph Ward-Ambler | For service to business and commerce | |
| William Hugh George Whittaker | For service to community health through HIV/AIDS organisations | |
| John Maxwell Wilcox | For service to the coal industry | |
| Verdon George Edward Garratt Williams | For service to music and to the community | |
| John Robert Williamson | For service to Australian country music and in stimulating awareness of conservation issues | |
| Denis Patrick Wilson | For service to athletics | |
| Dr George Wing | For service to dentistry | |
| Ian Alexander Christie Wood | For service to the State of Queensland | |

==== Military Division ====
| Branch | Recipient | Citation | Notes |
|---|---|---|---|
| Navy | Lieutenant Commander Barry Raymond Back | For service to the Royal Australian Navy, particularly in the areas of technical training and junior staff development at HMAS Nirimba | |
| Navy | Commander Timothy Nigel Bloomfield | For exceptional service as Director of Naval Personnel Services during the Gulf War | |
| Navy | Commodore David John Campbell | For service to the Royal Australian Navy, particularly as Australian Naval Attaché, Washington | |
| Navy | Commander Lee George Cordner | For exceptional service as Commanding Officer of HMAS SYDNEY during the Gulf War | |
| Navy | Lieutenant Commander Mark Desmond Georgelin | For service to the Royal Australian Navy, particularly as Commanding Officer, HMAS Warrnambool and for Australian Naval Reserve Training | |
| Navy | Commander Edward Graham Hack | For exceptional service as the Royal Australian Navy Liaison Officer Middle East | |
| Navy | Captain Christopher Angus Ritchie | For exceptional service as Commanding Officer of HMAS BRISBANE during the Gulf War | |
| Navy | Commodore Nigel John Stoker | For service to the Royal Australian Navy, particularly as the Deputy Maritime Commander and Chief of Staff | |
| Army | Colonel Ross Blake Bishop | For service to the Australian Defence Force as Director of Joint Operations, HQ ADF | |
| Army | Brigadier David Lindsay Howard Buring | For service to the Australian Defence Force as Director General Service Conditions | |
| Army | Colonel Peter Dudley Byrne | For service to the Australian Army Reserve as Director of Medical Service 4th Military District | |
| Army | Lieutenant Colonel Andrew James Molan | For service to the Australian Army as Commanding Officer 6th Battalion, the Royal Australian Regiment | |
| Army | Lieutenant Colonel John Dennis Petrie | For service to the Australian Army as Commanding Officer 1st Battalion, the Royal Australian Regiment | |
| Army | Brigadier James Walter Ryan | For service to the Australian Army as Chief of Staff Headquarters Logistic Command | |
| Army | Captain Garth Leonard Wheat | For service to the Australian Army in the field of training | |
| Air Force | Group Captain Raymond John Conroy | For service to the Royal Australian Air Force as Officer Commanding No 81 Wing | |
| Air Force | Wing Commander Donald Arthur Harris | For service to the Royal Australian Air Force as Director of Health Service Support — Air Force | |
| Air Force | Squadron Leader Grant Gene Macdonald | For service to the Royal Australian Air Force as Staff Officer Postings and Attachments, Directorate of Personnel — Airmen | |
| Air Force | Wing Commander Terry Alan Roediger | For service to the Royal Australian Air Force as Head Aircraft Engineer Section One Headquarters Logistic Command | |
| Air Force | Group Captain Colin Martin Smith | For service to the Royal Australian Air Force as Commanding Officer No 1 Stores Depot | |
| Air Force | Squadron Leader Neville Stephen Turnbull | For service to the Royal Australian Air Force as Officer-in-Charge Technologist Training Squadron | |

=== Medal (OAM) ===
==== General Division ====
| Recipient | Citation | Notes |
|---|---|---|
| Cora Mary Adcock | For service to the community | |
| Alfred George Warren Aikman | For service to the community and local government | |
| John Gilbert Alexander | For services to tennis | |
| Millicent Isobel Avery | For service to the community through community organisations and Christian work | |
| Alice Grace Farren Ayres | For service to youth through music | |
| Hope Ball | For service to gliding | |
| Gillian Leonie Banks | For service to the arts, particularly museums and galleries and to the National Trust | |
| Rayner Francisco Ferrer Bellchambers | For service to the environment and conservation | |
| Major Harold Cyril Benson | For service to veterans, particularly in the Gold Coast and Melbourne regions | |
| Peter James Berwick | For service to public health, particularly as Hospital Administrator of the Mornington Bush Nursing Home | |
| Lenora Alice Bishop | For service to the community and local government | |
| Nancy Deloi Bosler | For service to the community, particularly youth, aged people and to people with disabilities | |
| Lorenze Albert Bucton | For service to the community and to the aged | |
| Robert Alec Bull | For service to the community and voluntary service | |
| William Richard Burbidge | For service to aquatic sports | |
| Grahame James Bush | For service to the community | |
| Peter James Byrnes | For service to the Australian Government, particularly through assistance to the Australian community in Kuwait | |
| Robert James Campbell | For service to equestrian sports and rodeo competitions | |
| John Cann | For service to the community, conservation and the environment, particularly through natural history | |
| David George Carolane | For service to music, particularly choral music | |
| Gwenyth Hilda Carruthers | For service to veterans | |
| Peggy Carter | For service to the community | |
| Neville Cecil Cartledge | For service to the community | |
| Mary May Cavanagh | For services to the sport of lawn bowls | |
| Phillip Arthur Cayzer | For services to the sport of rowing | |
| Chee Kin Chew | For service to the Chinese community | |
| Michael Fitzgerald Clarkin | For service to the community through sponsorships of disadvantaged and sporting groups | |
| Flora Elizabeth Cobb | For service to the community through the Society of St Vincent de Paul | |
| Agnes Ann Coe | For service to the community, particularly Aboriginal welfare | |
| Kathleen Agnes Colwell | For service to the community, particularly the Royal Children's Hospital Auxiliary | |
| Bryan Francis Compton | For service to engineering, particularly the building and construction industry | |
| Gladys Doreen Cooney | For service to the community and local government | |
| James Abbott Corcoran | For service to the community and local government | |
| Alexander Crichton | For service to the sugar cane industry and to the community | |
| Irene Davison Crosthwaite | For service to the community | |
| Eva Cunningham | For service to community health, particularly through podiatry | |
| John James Cushing | For service to the sport of hockey and to the community | |
| Rev Henry Gilbert Davis | For service to the community, particularly the ecumenical movement | |
| Clara Elizabeth Davis | For service to the community, particularly animal welfare and protection | |
| William Allan Dawson | For service to the community and local government | |
| Richard Victor Diggins | For service to local government and to the community, particularly foster care | |
| Margaret Dodds | For service to nursing | |
| Ernest Maurice Dopson | For service to youth, particularly naval cadets | |
| Brian Stanhope Draper | For service to the sport of rowing, particularly through the SA Olympic Council | |
| Horace Hayden Drexel | For service to youth | |
| Frederick Alwyn Druce | For service to the community, particularly through fire and emergency services | |
| Alojzy Dziendziel, MBE | For service to the Polish community | |
| Blair Denis Edgar | For service to education and to the performing arts | |
| Peter Francis Egan | For service to radio, opera and to the community | |
| Sidney George Ellis | For service to surf lifesaving | |
| Basil Foster Emery | For service to the sport of cricket | |
| Margaret Lillian Eutick | For service to the community, particularly through the Lismore Base Hospital | |
| Joan Margot Evans | For service to the community through charitable organisations | |
| Lawrence Arthur Evans | For service to the community | |
| Gwendoline Ellen Fenech | For service to the Maltese community | |
| Dr David Patrick Finnegan | For service to the community through the Uniting Church and to the Royal Australian College of General Practitioners | |
| Cameron George Fitzgerald | For service to the Royal Lifesaving Society | |
| Barbara Fowler | For service to the arts, particularly crafts | |
| Harold Donald France | For service to veterans, particularly through the Dunkirk Veteran's Association | |
| Herbert Frank | For service to the Dutch community | |
| Keith Harding Franklin | For service to the media and communications through radio and television programmes on rural affairs | |
| Sidney Robert Freshwater | For service to the sport of cycling | |
| Anne Jessie Fuller | For service to the arts, particularly administration through the Victorian Association of Performing Arts and to the community | |
| Kathleen Genevieve Gallogly | For service to politics, particularly the Federal Executive of the Australian Labour Party, Queensland | |
| Robert Francis Gamble | For service to local government | |
| Clyde Garrow | For service to science and technology through the wool industry | |
| Alderman Donald Mackinnon Geddes | For service to the community, particularly the State Emergency Services | |
| Jean Gee | For service to the community, particularly sport and youth | |
| Doris Ethel Rosemary Gibbs | For service to the Gold Coast community | |
| John Henry Fawdon Gibson | For service to the community, particularly emergency services, marine search and rescue through the Royal Volunteer Coastal Patrol | |
| Monica Mary Glenn | For service to the community, particularly through women's affairs | |
| Frederick Ernest Glisson | For service to veterans | |
| Tessie Linda Goodstate | For service to the Bankstown community | |
| John Ferguson Gow | For service to veterans and to the Korumburra community | |
| Theodore James Gray | For service to primary industry, particularly through the exhibition poultry industry | |
| Commodore Kenneth Douglas Gray, DFC, (Rtd) | For service to aged people | |
| Dawn Estelle Greig | For service to the community, particularly fire and emergency services | |
| Horace Joseph Osborne Ham | For service to the community, through local organisations | |
| Harry Hammond | For service to the community, particularly Lions Club International, and to nursing | |
| Bernard Joseph Harley | For service to the Illawarra Catholic Club and the club industry | |
| Patricia Lesley Harrison | For service to local government and women's affairs | |
| Angelo George Hatsatouris | For service to the Greek community | |
| Meredith Jean Hayes | For service to primary industry, conservation and the environment | |
| Hilton Beresford Hayes | For service to people with disabilities | |
| Mervyn Thomas Hazell | For service to sailing, water rescue and rugby union coaching | |
| Colin Selwyn Heckenberg | For service to the community through the Royal Lifesaving Society of Australia | |
| Mary Mildred Heffernan | For service to women's athletics, and people with physical disabilities and visual impairments | |
| Gordon Yian Henry | For service to the community, particularly through the Freedom From Hunger organisation, and to the Chinese community | |
| Councillor Clement Bertrand Hill | For service to local government and the community | |
| Don Alan Hodge | For service to the community, particularly during the floods of 1990 in Forbes | |
| Kevin Vincent Hodgson | For service to local government and to the community | |
| George John Whitelaw Hogg | For service to choral singing and eisteddfod | |
| Dorothy Caroling Hollingsworth | For service to education, particularly through educational broadcasting to schools | |
| John Douglas Warren Holt | For service to veterans | |
| Bertha Marie Horrobin | For service to the community | |
| Ronald Leonard Horswell | For service to community health, through the Waste Disposal Contractors Association of NSW | |
| Arthur John Hort | For service to the community | |
| John Russell Hudson | For service to youth, particularly through the Skillshare program | |
| Adrian Rex Hurley | For service to basketball | |
| Desmond Joseph Illingworth | For services to greyhound racing | |
| Brian Harold Iivimey | For service to Rugby Union football | |
| Lorna Dorothy Jenkins | For service to the community through the Ecumenical Coffee Brigade | |
| Thomas Alexander Johnson | For service to Australian Rules football | |
| Kevan Reginald Johnston | For service to the performing arts as a choreographer actor and dance teacher | |
| Helen Denise Jones | For service to music as a singer and choir conductor | |
| Eunice Beryl Kennedy | For service to those with intellectual disabilities and to the community | |
| Desmond John Knight | For service to the community | |
| Guelah Korman | For service to the community | |
| James Henry Kuhl | For service to the community and local government | |
| Josephine Lacey | For service to community relations and the Jewish community | |
| Judith Alice Lamb | For service to the community | |
| LeRoy John Landis | For service to youth through the Australian Cadet Corps | |
| Beatrice Maud Landsberg | For service to music and theatre | |
| Mervyn Leigh Langford-Jones | For service to horse racing and the community | |
| David Alexander Lawson | For service to the community, particularly aged people | |
| John Hasker Learmonth | For service to medicine as a rural practitioner and educator | |
| Jeffrey Denison Lee | For service to music | |
| Richard Leonard Leggo | For service to local government | |
| Edmund Terry Lenthall | For voluntary service to the community | |
| Julie Marion Lewis | For service to literature as an author and teacher | |
| Rhodanthe Grace Lipsett | For service to infant health and the care of mothers and babies | |
| John Staunton Loney | For service to disadvantaged people through the Society of St Vincent de Paul | |
| Joan Lyon | For service to scouting | |
| Eric Lyon | For service to scouting | |
| Harry Alexander MacDonald | For service to education | |
| Kevin Maunder | For service to gymnastics | |
| Judith Ann May | For service to the community and local government | |
| Edward John McBarron | For service to conservation and the environment, and to systematic botany | |
| John Francis McCafferty | For service to the road transport industry and tourism | |
| Annie Evelyn McClure | For service to the community, particularly those with visual impairments | |
| Keith McColl | For service to the wool industry | |
| Veronica Catherine McCormack | For voluntary service to the community | |
| Malcolm Cameron McDonald | For service to the community, particularly the Ambulance Service and Fire and Emergency Services | |
| Norma Violet McGovern | For voluntary service to the community | |
| Dorothy Marie McHugh | For service to netball | |
| Richard Harold McIntyre | For service to music as former director of the Canberra Youth Orchestra | |
| Desmond James McKenna | For service to the community, particularly through the establishment of St Francis Xavier College | |
| Aubrey Moore Mellor | For service to the performing arts | |
| John Alexander Laird Menard | For service to local government and the community | |
| Darren John Mercer | For service to surf lifesaving | |
| Dean Paul Mercer | For service to surf lifesaving | |
| Valmae Merrin | For service to Australian detainees in Thailand | |
| Thomas Alexander Middleton | For service to sports administration and the community | |
| Brigadier Christopher John Miles, (R'td) | For service to croquet | |
| Alan George Milton | For service to local government | |
| Joan Margaret Morison | For service to canoeing and kayaking | |
| Geofrey Peter Motley | For service to sport administration and Australian Rules football | |
| Kathleen Patricia Mutimer | For service to aged people | |
| Jean Nancy Neilsen | For service to the community, particularly aged people | |
| Robert Nelson | For service to wartime merchant mariners | |
| Joyce Doreen Newton | For service to nursing administration and education | |
| Noel Edward Nicholls | For service to the community, particularly veterans | |
| Rev Heinrich Johannes Noack | For service to religion | |
| William James Norbury | For service to veterans | |
| Ronald O'Brien | For service to those with severe multiple physical disabilities | |
| Mary Julia Dympna O'Keefe | For service to low income people in the community | |
| Desmond Hilary O'Meara | For service to veterans | |
| Frank Bennett O'Shea | For service to youth, through training courses for forest industries | |
| Jock Osmotherly | For service to scouting and to the community | |
| Ivor George Paech | For service to veterans | |
| Severyn Pejsachowicz | For service to the Jewish community | |
| John Gidney Pennell | For service to Sport administration, particularly pentathlon and biathlon events and for service to the community | |
| Leslie James Peterson | For service to international relations, particularly through the South Pacific School Aid Project | |
| George William Phillips, ED | For service to the community, particularly through the State Emergency Service | |
| Dr Trevor George Pickering | For service to medicine | |
| John Eric Pickersgill | For service to social welfare | |
| Gerda Pinter | For service to the community | |
| Thomas Henry Piper | For service to the community | |
| Brian Polomka | For service to local government and to architecture | |
| Neville John Pratt | For service to baseball | |
| John David Printz | For service to veterans | |
| Ruby Dawn Prior | For service to the Alice Springs Royal Flying Doctor Auxiliary | |
| Phyllis Anne Quick | For service to the community | |
| Helen Margaret Jennifer Reid | For service to education, particularly of girls | |
| Kathleen Rose Reidy | For service to industrial relations and to nursing | |
| Edward James Richards | For service to veterans | |
| Raymond Charles Richards | For service to the community | |
| Desmond Geoffrey Morland Rickards | For service to the community, to local government and to golf | |
| Geoffrey James Riley | For service to the community | |
| Graham Houghton Roberts | For service to golf and the community | |
| Jennefer Mary Roberts | For service to education administration | |
| Marie delaPlato Roberts | For service to music education, particularly the violin | |
| Penelope Joan Robertson | For service to people with disabilities | |
| Keith Ernest Rooney | For service to the community | |
| Brian Charles Rope | For service to the community and to religion | |
| Dr Isaac Michael Rosen | For service to medicine, particularly in the field of urology | |
| Roberto Rossi | For service to local government and the community | |
| Sylvia Jessie Rowell | For service to the community, particularly through the Royal Perth Hospital | |
| Mildred Ila Rudge | For service to children's welfare as a foster carer | |
| Elizabeth Melva Rushton | For service to the community | |
| Richard Alfred Scanlan | For service to the community | |
| David Hamilton Scotland, BEM | For service to pipe band music and the community | |
| Ian David Scott | For service to surf lifesaving | |
| Wilfred James Secomb | For service to the community, including through the Uniting Church in Australia | |
| Rev Maurice Albert Joseph Shinnick | For service to community health, particularly as Chaplain to Acceptance, Adelaide | |
| Audrey Rosa Sifleet | For service to people with physical disabilities | |
| Edmund Thomas Smith | For service to education and to the community | |
| Isabel Elizabeth Smith | For service to children's welfare | |
| James Edward Smith | For service to community safety, particularly through the Ambulance Rescue School | |
| David Joseph Solomon | For service to the Jewish community | |
| Anthony Eric South | For service to people with disabilities and to disadvantaged groups | |
| Frederick Phillip Spielvogel | For service to local government and to the community | |
| Lilian Ruth Squair | For service to people with disabilities, particularly through Riding for Disabled | |
| Allan Edward Staal | For service to local government and the community | |
| Helen Grace Stafford | For service to youth and the aged | |
| Ronald James Standen | For service to the community | |
| Sidonie Mary Stormonth | For service to the community | |
| John Michael Armstrong Stringer | For service to the community, particularly through the Royal Volunteer Coastal Patrol | |
| Robert William John Talbott | For service to wheelchair sports and to people with disabilities | |
| Allan Duval Tannock | For service to the veterans and to the community | |
| Reginald Henry Taylor | For service to local government | |
| Hazel Winifred Taylor | For service to women, particularly through the War Widows' Guild | |
| Norman Allan Templeton | For service to the community and local government | |
| Ruby Margaret Thomasson | For service to scouting | |
| Raymond Francis Tilley | For service to book retailing and the community | |
| Henry Verdun Traeger,BEM | For service to veterans | |
| Peter John Treseder | For service to bushwalking | |
| Stephen Leslie Tubb | For service to the Australian Government, particularly through assistance to the Australian community in Kuwait | |
| Michael Joseph Tuck | For service to Australian Rules football | |
| Alderman Noel Victor Unicomb | For service to local government and the community | |
| Marinus Gerardus van Arkel | For service to ethnic communities and to veterans | |
| Winifred Mary Vears | For service to the community | |
| Diana Aileen Walder | For service to the arts, particularly through the Art Gallery of New South Wales | |
| Kevin James Walkom | For service to the community, particularly through the Society of St Vincent de Paul | |
| Alan Robert Wallis | For service to motorcycling | |
| Maxwell Joseph Watters | For service to the arts, particularly as a teacher and promoter of the arts in the Upper Hunter region | |
| John Edmond Wellings | For service to adult education | |
| Mary Weston | For service to the community | |
| John Joseph Whelan | For service to social welfare, particularly through the San Miguel Centre | |
| Herbert Frederick White | For service to industrial relations, particularly through the Trades and Labour Council of Queensland | |
| Barry Wilbur Wilkins | For service to tourism, particularly through the Begonia Festival | |
| Pegi Williams | For service to children's literature | |
| Herbert Henry Williams | For service to veterans | |
| Leslie James Williams | For service to the community | |
| Selwyn Peter Willmott | For service to local government | |
| Olga Jean Wood | For service to youth, particularly through the Girl Guides Association | |
| Francis Stewart Wren | For service to Australian Rules football, to local government and the community | |
| Peter Graham Young | For service to youth and the Baptist Church | |

==== Military Division ====
| Branch | Recipient | Citation | Notes |
|---|---|---|---|
| Navy | Chief Petty Officer David James Evans | For service to the Royal Australian Navy, particularly as Senior Sailor in charge of physical training and sport, HMAS Coonawarra | |
| Navy | Warrant Officer Geoffrey Michael Gammon | For service to the Royal Australian Navy, particularly as Ship Repair Manager HMAS Cairns | |
| Navy | Petty Officer Peter John Herbst | For meritorious service to Australian Clearance Diving Team Three as an Operations Petty Officer in Kuwait 1991 | |
| Navy | Chief Petty Officer Stephen John Langridge | For meritorious service as Officer-in-Charge, Logistics Support Detachment, Bahrain | |
| Navy | Warrant Officer Ronald Norman Rogers | For service to the Royal Australian Navy, particularly as Parade Training Officer, HMAS Cerberus | |
| Navy | Chief Petty Officer Christopher Clark Smith | For meritorious service as Liquid Cargo Officer and Officer-in-Charge of Refrigeration and Hull Maintenance in HMAS WESTRALIA | |
| Navy | Petty Officer James Dennis Thompson | For service to the Royal Australian Navy, particularly as the Administrative Assistant in Naval Support Command Personal Service Organisation | |
| Navy | Warrant Officer Josef Wagner | For service to the Royal Australian Navy, particularly as Naval Manager of Endeavour House | |
| Army | Warrant Officer Class One Lynn Andrews | For service to the Royal Australian Defence Force as the system manager HQ Defence Force Command Support System | |
| Army | Warrant Officer Class Two Christopher Paul Baker | For service to the Australian Army as CSM of the Australian Army Training Team, Papua New Guinea | |
| Army | Warrant Officer Class One Wayne Maxwell Birrell | For service to the Australian Army as the Ordinance Liaison Warrant Officer for the 6th Military District | |
| Army | Warrant Officer Class One Kevin Douglas Browning | For service to the Australian Army as Master Gunner HQ Land Command Artillery | |
| Army | Warrant Officer Class Two Judith Margaret Burke | For service to the Australian Army in the field of training development | |
| Army | Warrant Officer Class Two William John Cartmell | For service to the Australian Army as Supervisor Communications 104th Signal Squadron | |
| Army | Warrant Officer Class One Christopher Martin Fenton | For service to the Australian Army as the Warrant Officer Ceremonial Headquarters 2nd Military District | |
| Army | Warrant Officer Class One Elizabeth Anne Madden | For service to the Australian Army as Sergeant Major of the 3rd Military Police Company | |
| Army | Warrant Officer Class One Robert Ernest McKeown | For service to the Australian Army as the Regimental Sergeant Major 1st Recruit Training Battalion | |
| Army | Warrant Officer Class Two Peter David Muir | For service to the Australian Army Reserve as the Battery Sergeant Major 28 Field Battery 7 Field Regiment | |
| Army | Warrant Officer Class Two Ian Matthew Petch | For service to the Australian Army in the introduction and development of small arms procedures | |
| Army | Captain Roy Savage MM | For service to the Australian Army Reserve while serving with District Support Unit Rockhampton | |
| Army | Warrant Officer Class Two John Albert Schwerdfeger | For service to the Australian Army in the field of training | |
| Air Force | Warrant Officer Anthony Paul Cini | For service to the Royal Australian Air Force as RAAF Representative Office QANTAS | |
| Air Force | Warrant Officer Alan Edward Giltrap | For service to Royal Australian Air Force as Warrant Officer Disciplinary No. 2 Flying Training School. | |
| Air Force | Warrant Officer Eric Charles Hayward | For service to the Royal Australian Air Force as Drum Major and Band Warrant Officer | |
| Air Force | Sergeant William James Hoskin | For service to the Royal Australian Air Force as Weapon Engineering Air Force Office | |
| Air Force | Warrant Officer Michael William Jackson | For service to the Royal Australian Air Force as Warrant Officer-in-Charge Base Radio Base Squadron Williams | |
| Air Force | Warrant Officer Robert John Lightburn | For service to the Royal Australian Air Force as Senior Firefighter Air Force Office | |
| Air Force | Warrant Officer Larry Desmond Stapleton | For service to the Royal Australian Air Force as Flight Engineer for the Boeing 707 Tanker introduction into service | |
