= Cedric Ian Turner =

Australian architect

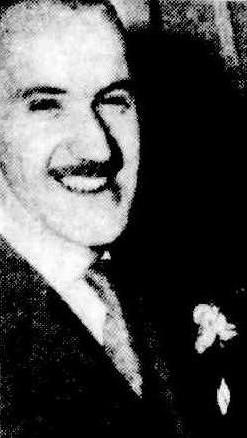
- Cedric Ian Turner (1948)
- Born: 22 February 1922; Kew, Victoria, Australia
- Died: 11 September 1983 (aged 61)
- Other names: C. Ian Turner
- Education: University of Melbourne
- Occupation: Architect
- Practice: C. Ian Turner & Associates

Cedric Ian Turner (22 February 1922 – 11 September 1983) was an Australian architect and jazz enthusiast.

== Life and career ==
Born 22 February 1922 in Kew, Victoria, Cedric Ian Turner graduated Melbourne Grammar School and began a Bachelor in Architecture at University of Melbourne in 1939. Before completing his studies, he enlisted in the Australian Army in 1941, but was discharged after five months due to health problems.

He worked as a draftsman for Sydney R. Bell & Associates until 1945 when he joined Yuncken, Freeman Brothers, Griffiths & Simpson. Due to leaving his studies incomplete when he joined the Army, Turner wasn't able to register as an architect until April 1946 after completing additional studies in his spare time. He later established his own practice C. Ian Turner & Associates in Melbourne, with work including a mix of small-scale residential projects and larger-scale industrial, commercial and civic projects. His residential work was known for considering the occupants views in the home design. C. Ian Turner & Associates were the architects behind a redevelopment of The Capitol Theatre in Melbourne, which begun in 1965, and included the creation of the Capitol Arcade.

Turner continued his practice until the late 1970s, after which he became an associate to town planner Kenneth Bethell. He continued this work until his death in 1983.

== Jazz ==
Outside of architecture, Turner was known for his interest in jazz within Australia.

After serving in the war, Turner recorded several jazz sessions with Ade Monsbourgh and intended to release them under a new record label called Jelly Roll. But by 1946, he abandoned these plans because he was too busy with his architecture career. Some of the acetates were given to Bill Miller and released on his Ampersand label, and a full album of the Jelly Roll sessions was later released by the Australian Jazz Museum.

Turner took over as editor of Jazz Notes, an Australian journal focused on jazz music originally founded in 1941. He remained editor between January 1945 and June 1946, and was succeeded by John W. Rippin. It was in an issue of the journal that he proposed holding a jazz convention in Melbourne over Christmas 1946, which resulted in the first Australian Jazz Convention. The idea had previously been proposed to Turner by Ade Monsbourgh during the war. During the 1949 Convention, Turner acted as MC.
