= Gary Costello =

Gary Costello may refer to:

- Gary Costello (Family Affairs), a character on the British soap opera Family Affairs
- Gary Costello (musician) (died 2006), Australian jazz bassist
