= Paul Grabowsky =

Australian pianist and composer

Paul Grabowsky AO
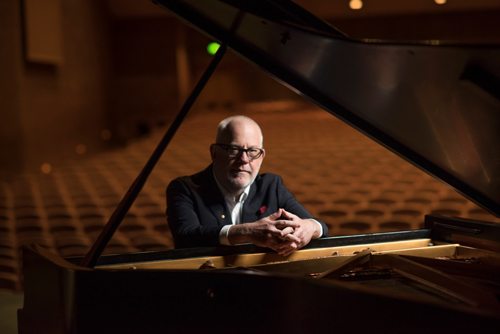

Background information
- Born: Paul Atherstone Grabowsky; 27 September 1958 (age 68); Lae, Papua New Guinea
- Origin: Melbourne, Australia
- Genre: Jazz
- Occupations: Musician and composer
- Instrument: Piano
- Website: paulgrabowsky.com.au

Paul Atherstone Grabowsky AO (born 27 September 1958) is an Australian pianist and composer and the founder of the Australian Art Orchestra.

== Life and career ==
Born in Lae, Papua New Guinea, Grabowsky is a pianist and composer of music for film, theatre, and opera. His father Alistair had lived in Papua New Guinea with his wife Charlotte since the 1930s working on oil rigs, building roads, and flying planes. Grabowsky described his ancestry as "failed Polish aristocracy". His grandfather was a legitimate Polish count of the Grabowski noble family, a descendant of Jan Jerzy Grabowski from where he gets his title; his grandfather was exiled from Poland and lived in Scotland. His older brother Michael took great interest in the young composer and later worked with Paul co-ordinating and producing many of his television and film scores in the 1990s.

Grabowsky grew up in Glen Waverley, Melbourne. He began piano lessons when he was five years old. He studied the classical repertoire with Mack Jost, senior lecturer in piano at the Conservatorium of Music at the University of Melbourne, from the age of seven until his university years. He attended Wesley College and it was that school's jazz band which introduced him to the genre.

=== 1980s ===
Immersing himself in jazz, Grabowsky left the conservatorium in 1978 to pursue musical studies at the Juilliard School in New York and then embarked on extensive travel in Europe. In 1980 he worked in the Melbourne cabaret/comedy scene where he began his relationship with Steve Vizard and Robyn Archer. He flew to London in 1980 and then travelled via Spain to Germany; he lived in Munich until 1985. He had been back in Australia for Christmas 1982 when, on the invitation of Red Symons, he co-composed his first film score, the first of many. In Europe he played with many musicians including Chet Baker, Art Farmer and Johnny Griffin as well as influential European artists. In 1983, Grabowsky formed the Paul Grabowsky Trio with Allan Browne and Gary Costello. The duo recorded the album Six by Three, which was released in 1989 and won the trio an ARIA Music Award at the ARIA Music Awards of 1990.

After his return to Australia in 1986 he played in various jazz ensembles. Grabowsky produced Vince Jones' ARIA Award-winning album It All Ends Up in Tears. In 1987, Grabowsky formed the Wizards of Oz with Saxophonist Dale Barlow, bassist Lloyd Swanton and drummer Tony Buck. Wizards of Oz recorded Soundtrack and won the ARIA Award for Best Jazz Album at the ARIA Music Awards of 1989. During this time, he also wrote the score to the film The Last Days of Chez Nous and for television shows Phoenix, Janus and Fast forward.

=== 1990s ===
Grabowsky and the Groovematics were the innovative house band on the Seven Network TV show Tonight Live with Steve Vizard from February 1990 to November 1993. This show was live five nights a week. Grabowsky also continued to compose scores for feature films many of which won awards.

In 1990 he was commissioned to write several pieces for the Munich-based jazz and contemporary music group Die Konferenz. One group of the pieces were based on songs of Édith Piaf ("Et les Affaires Piaf"), while a second group were based on songs from German UFA films from the 1920s to 1940s ("Es wird einmal ein Wunder"). With the support from its artistic director, Richard Wherrett, this led to the formation of the Ringing the Bell Backwards project at the Melbourne International Arts Festival and eventually to the Australian Art Orchestra in 1994. That year Grabowsky wrote a piano concerto for Michael Kieran Harvey.

He is married to Margot Salomon and in 1991 their first child was born; Isabella Grabowsky. Their son Guy Grabowsky was born in 1995.

In 1995 the Australian Art Orchestra toured Europe, and in 1996 India. Grabowsky directed the Victorian Arts Centre's Summer Music program. Later that year he was commissioned to front the 14-part ABC TV series Access All Areas. As commissioning editor for ABC Television Arts and Entertainment (1996–1998), he commissioned the documentary series Long Way to the Top. During the late 1990s, Grabowsky concentrated on writing music for film and television: Molokai: The Story of Father Damien (1999) and Innocence (2000) by Paul Cox, Siam Sunset by John Polson, the NBC mini-series Noah's Ark and the UK production Shiner. Northern Rivers Performing Arts (NORPA) commissioned his first opera, The Mercenary, with a (libretto by Janis Balodis).

=== 2000s ===
In 2000 The Theft of Sita project (a collaboration with Wayan Yudane) came to fruition; it combined jazz elements, Balinese gamelan music and puppetry. The piece premiered in Adelaide and has since toured worldwide. In that year, Grabowsky was also involved in writing music for the opening ceremonies of the Sydney Olympics and the Paralympics. Since then, he has written the opera Love in the Age of Therapy (libretto by Joanna Murray-Smith) commissioned by Melbourne Festival and Sydney Festival, and the symphony Streets of Hurqalya (26 June 2002), commissioned by the Melbourne Symphony Orchestra. Among his recent film scores are Fred Schepisi's Last Orders and It Runs in the Family, The Eye of the Storm, Empire Falls (HBO) Paul Cox's The Diaries of Vaslav Nijinsky, and Disney's The Jungle Book 2. From 2003 to 2007, Grabowsky was commissioner at the Australian Film Commission. In 2004 he became involved in Charles Darwin University's Remote Indigenous Music Program.

In 2004 Grabowsky visited the remote community in the Northern Territory called Ngukurr to meet the traditional songmen. He met with the local elders and, after hearing two Wagilak songmen sing, asked permission to bring his orchestra on a return visit. When he returned in 2005, he brought singer-songwriters Archie Roach and his wife Ruby Hunter, along with 10 members of his Australian Art Orchestra. After working together for five days, the musicians staged a concert in the town. The European musicians learnt about the manikay (song cycles) and were led to experiment with whole new ways of exploring sound.

The resulting project, called Crossing Roper Bar, toured the Northern Territory, played at the Birrarung Marr park in Melbourne, the National Gallery of Victoria, the Apollo Bay Music Festiva,l and the Sydney Opera House. When the group travelled to Gulkula to play at the 2006 Garma Festival, the Yolngu songmen from nearby regions were amazed, thinking that those songs had been lost long ago. In 2010 a Crossing Roper Bar album was released.

In 2005 Grabowsky was appointed artistic director for the Queensland Music Festival 2007. His song cycle Before Time Could Change Us, lyrics by Dorothy Porter and featuring Katie Noonan, was commissioned by the Queensland Music Festival and released in 2005 by the Warner Music Group. The album peaked at number 65 on the ARIA Charts and number 3 on the ARIA Jazz chart. He recorded an album of original jazz compositions, Tales of Time and Space, with Branford Marsalis (soprano sax), Joe Lovano (tenor sax), Scott Tinkler (trumpet), Ed Schuller (bass) and Jeff "Tain" Watts (drums). In 2007 he was appointed inaugural patron of the National Film and Sound Archive's project Sounds of Australia.

On 4 January 2008 the prestigious Adelaide Festival of Arts appointed Grabowsky artistic director for the 2010 festival, its 50th anniversary year. He was then asked to stay on and direct the 2012 Adelaide Festival.

=== 2010s ===
In June 2012 Grabowsky was appointed vice-chancellor's professorial fellow in the School of Music at Monash University and in July 2012, he was appointed executive director, Performing Arts, Academy of Performing Arts, Monash University.

In 2014 Grabowsky was awarded the Order of Australia (AO) for services to music as an educator, a mentor composer and pianist. He won his 5th Aria Award in 2014 for his sextet recording of original compositions The Bitter Suite.

In 2015/2016 he wrote the music and songs for theatre work Last Man Standing performed by the Melbourne Theatre Company, words and play by Steve Vizard; the two teamed again to write another new music theatre work, Banquet of Secrets, performed by the Victorian Opera company.

== Awards and nominations ==
=== AIR Awards ===
The Australian Independent Record Awards (commonly known informally as AIR Awards) is an annual awards night to recognise, promote and celebrate the success of Australia's Independent Music sector.

Year	Nominee / work	Award	Result
2008	Lost and Found (as Oehlers Grabowsky Keevers)	Best Independent Jazz Album	Nominated
2010	On a Clear Day	Best Independent Jazz Album	Nominated
2014	The Bitter Suite	Best Independent Jazz Album	Won
2017	Provanance (with Vince Jones)	Best Independent Jazz Album	Nominated
2020	Tryst	Best Independent Jazz Album or EP	Won

=== APRA Awards ===
The APRA Awards (Australia) are annual awards to celebrate excellence in contemporary music, which honour the skills of member composers, songwriters and publishers who have achieved outstanding success in sales and airplay performance. They commenced in 1982. Paul Grabowsky has won seven awards from twenty nominations.

Year	Nominee / work	Award	Result
1989	"Disappearing Shoreline"	Most Performed Australasian Jazz Work	Won
1990	"Tonite I'm Alive with You" (with Yuri Worontschak)	Most Performed Australasian Jazz Work	Won
1993	Phoenix (Series 2)	Television or Film Theme of the Year	Won
1993	"Welcome to the World of Major Crime"	Jazz Composition of the Year	Nominated
1996	Mushrooms	Best Film Score	Nominated
2000	Siam Sunset	Best Film Score	Nominated
2001	Innocence	Best Film Score	Nominated
2004	"Stars Apart" (performed by Allan Browne)	Most Performed Jazz Work of the Year	Nominated
2005	Art of War	Best Music for a Television Series or Serial	Nominated
2006	"Silverland"	Most Performed Jazz Work of the Year	Nominated
2006	Unfolding Florence: The Many Lives of Florence Broadhurst	Best Music for a Documentary	Won
2009	"Raindrop"	Jazz Work of the Year	Nominated
2013	"Falling" (with Gabriella Smart)	Instrumental Work of the Year	Nominated
2014	"Tall Tales" (performed by Monash Art Ensemble)	Jazz Work of the Year	Won
2015	"Love Like a Curse" (performed by Monash Art Ensemble)	Jazz Work of the Year	Nominated
2015	"The Nightingale and the Rose" (with Genevieve Lacey and Flinders Quartet)	Instrumental Work of the Year	Nominated
2016	"Nyilipidgi" (with Young Wägilak Group)	Jazz Work of the Year	Won
2016	"Spiel" (with Niko Schäuble)	Jazz Work of the Year	Nominated
2017	"Moons of Jupiter"	Jazz Work of the Year	Nominated
2018	Comeclose and Sleepnow: Six Liverpool Love Songs (with The Monash Art Ensemble and Gian Slater)	Vocal / Choral Work of the Year	Nominated

=== ARIA Awards ===
The ARIA Music Awards are annual awards, which recognises excellence, innovation, and achievement across all genres of Australian music. They commenced in 1987. Paul Grabowsky has won seven awards from seventeen nominations.

Year	Nominee / work	Award	Result	Ref.
1990	Six by Three (as Paul Grabowsky Trio)	Best Jazz Album	Won	
1991	The Moon & You	Best Jazz Album	Nominated	
1993	Tee Vee	Best Jazz Album	Nominated	
1993	The Last Days of Chez Nous	Best Original Soundtrack/Cast/Show Album	Nominated	
1996	When Words Fail (as Paul Grabowsky Trio)	Best Jazz Album	Won	
1998	Angel (as Paul Grabowsky Trio with Shelley Scown)	Best Jazz Album	Nominated	
2000	Siam Sunset	Best Original Soundtrack Album	Nominated	
2001	Three (a.k.a. PG3) (as Paul Grabowsky Trio)	Best Jazz Album	Nominated	
2004	Tales of Time and Space	Best Jazz Album	Nominated	
2005	Before Time Could Change Us (with Katie Noonan)	Best Jazz Album	Won	
2006	Always (with Bernie McGann)	Best Jazz Album	Nominated	
2014	The Bitter Suite	Best Jazz Album	Won	
2015	Solo	Best Jazz Album	Nominated	
2016	Provenance (with Vince Jones)	Best Jazz Album	Won	
2016	Nyilipidgi (with Monash Art Ensemble, Daniel Ngukurr Boy Wilfred & David Yipininy Wilfred)	Best World Music Album	Nominated	
2019	Tryst (with Kate Ceberano)	Best Jazz Album	Won	
2020	Please Leave Your Light On (with Paul Kelly)	Best Jazz Album	Won	

=== Australian Jazz Bell Awards ===
The Australian Jazz Bell Awards, (also known as the Bell Awards or The Bells), are annual music awards for the jazz music genre in Australia. They commenced in 2003.

Year	Nominee / work	Award	Result
2006	Paul Grabowsky	Australian Jazz Artist of the Year	Won
2007	"Five Bells" – Paul Grabowsky	Australian Jazz Composition of the Year	Won
2009	Lost and Found (as Oehlers, Grabowsky, Beck)	Best Australian Contemporary Jazz Album	Won

- Note wins only

=== Helpmann Awards ===
The Helpmann Awards is an awards show, celebrating live entertainment and performing arts in Australia, presented by industry group Live Performance Australia since 2001. Note: 2020 and 2021 were cancelled due to the COVID-19 pandemic.

Year	Nominee / work	Award	Result	Ref.
2001	The Theft of Sita (with I Wayan Gde Yudane)	Best Original Score	Won	
2003	Love in the Age of Therapy (with Joanna Murray-Smith)	Best Original Score	Nominated	
2005	Tales of Time and Space	Best Performance in an Australian Contemporary Concert	Nominated	

=== Music Victoria Awards ===
The Music Victoria Awards are an annual awards night celebrating Victorian music. They commenced in 2006.

Year	Nominee / work	Award	Result	Ref.
2017	Torrio! (With Mirko Guerrini & Niko Schäuble)	Best Jazz Album	Nominated	

=== Sidney Myer Performing Arts Awards ===
The Sidney Myer Performing Arts Awards commenced in 1984 and recognise outstanding achievements in dance, drama, comedy, music, opera, circus and puppetry.

Year	Nominee / work	Award	Result
2001	Paul Grabowsky	Individual Award	awarded

=== Other Awards ===
- 1988 & 1989 Rolling Stone Magazine (Australia) Jazz Artist of the Year
- 1989 AFI nomination (Best Original Music Score) for Georgia
- 1991 AFI nomination (Best Music Score) for A Woman's Tale
- 1992 AFI nomination (Best Music Score) for The Last Days of Chez Nous
- 1994 AFI nomination (Best Original Music Score) for Exile
- 1995 AFI Award (Open Craft Award) for The Good Looker
- 1999 Australian Guild of Screen Composers nomination for the film Siam Sunset
- 2000 The Age Award (Best Production) for The Theft of Sita
- 2003 World Soundtrack Academy nomination for The Jungle Book 2
- 2004 AFI (Open Craft Award) nomination for Jessica
- 2006 AFI nomination for Unfolding Florence: The Many Lives of Florence Broadhurst
- 2007 Melbourne Prize for Music

== Discography ==
List of albums, with selected chart positions
Title	Album details	Peak chart positions
Title	Album details	AUS
The Moon + You	Released: 1990; Label: WEA (171142-1); Formats: CD, LP	–
The Zurich Sessions (with Sunk Poeschl and Peter Bockius)	Released: 1990; Label: Formats: 12" Vinyl	–
Tee Vee	Released: 1992; Label: EastWest (9031755752); Formats: CD	–
The Last Days of Chez Nous (soundtrack)	Released: 1992; Label: Formats: CD, Cassette	–
Phoenix (soundtrack)	Released: 1993; Label: ABC Music, Phonogram (514445–2); Formats: CD	–
Viva Viva	Released: 1993; Label: EastWest, Warner Music (4509941672); Formats: CD	–
Angel (with Shelley Scown)	Released: 1997; Label: ORIGiN (OR 025)	–
Keep Up Your Standards (with Robyn Archer)	Released: 1997; Label: Larrikin Records (LRF483); Formats: CD	–
Passion(with Australian Art Orchestra)	Released: 1999; Label: ABC Classics (465 nat|230–2}}); Formats: CD	–
Noah's Ark (soundtrack)	Released: 1999; Label: Varèse Sarabande (VSD6027); Formats: CD	–
Siam Sunset (soundtrack)	Released: 1999; Label: Mana Music (D32124); Formats: CD	–
Shiner (soundtrack)	Released: 2000; Label: Decca (470183-2); Formats: CD	–
Last Orders (soundtrack)	Released: 2002; Label: Colosseum (CVS 6330.2); Formats: CD	–
Big Adventure (with Philip Rex and Niko Schauble)	Released: 2004; Label: ABC Jazz (476283-5); Formats: CD, Digital Download	–
Tales of Time And Space	Released: 2004; Label: ABC Jazz (476283-5); Formats: CD, Digital Download	–
Ruby (with Archie Roach, Ruby Hunter and Australian Art)	Released: 2005; Label: Australian Art Orchestra; Formats: CD, Digital Download	–
Before Time Could Change Us (with Katie Noonan)	Released: August 2005; Label: Australian Art Orchestra; Formats: CD, Digital Download	65
Hush Collection (Volume 3: Paul Grabowsky)	Released: 2005; Label: Hush Music Foundation (HUSH 003); Formats: CD	–
Always (with Bernie McGann)	Released: May 2006; Label: ABC Jazz – (4765272); Formats: CD, DD	–
Hush Collection (Volume 7: Ten Healing Songs by Paul Grabowsky)	Released: 2007; Label: Hush Music Foundation (HUSH 007); Formats: CD	–
Lost and Found (with Jamie Oehlers and David Beck)	Released: 2007; Label: Jazzhead; Formats: CD	–
On a Clear Day (with Jamie Oehlers)	Released: July 2010; Label: Jamie Oehlers, Paul Grabowsky; Formats: CD, DD	–
The Bitter Suite (as Paul Grabowsky Sextet)	Released: May 2014; Label: ABC Jazz (3771278); Formats: CD, DD	–
Solo	Released: 31 October 2014; Label: ABC Jazz (4703342); Formats: CD, DD	–
Words and Pictures (Soundtrack)	Released: March 2015; Label: Lakeshore Records; Formats: CD, DD	–
Spiel (with Nikolaus Schäuble)	Released: August 2015; Label: Paul Grabowsky and Nico Schäuble; Formats: CD, DD	–
Provenance (with Vince Jones)	Released: 16 October 2015; Label: ABC Jazz (4753486); Formats: CD, DD	–
Nyilipidgi (with Daniel Ngukurr Boy Wilfred, David Yipininy Wilfred and Monash Art Ensemble)	Released: June 2016; Label: ABC Jazz (4796386); Formats: CD, DD	–
Shift (with Rob Burke, George Lewis and Mark Helias)	Released: 7 April 2017; Label: Future Music Records (FMRCD441-0217); Formats: CD, DD	–
Torrio! (with Mirko Guerrini, Niko Schäuble)	Released: November 2017; Label: Encore Jazz; Formats: DD	–
Moons of Jupiter (featuring Scott Tinkler, Erkki Veltheim and Peter Knight)	Released: 24 April 2018; Label: Besant Hall Records; Formats: DD	–
Tryst (with Kate Ceberano)	Released: 3 May 2019; Label: ABC / Universal Music Australia (7762180); Formats: CD, DD, Streaming	147
Please Leave Your Light On (with Paul Kelly)	Released: 31 July 2020; Label: EMI Music; Formats: CD, DD, Streaming, LP	3
