= Shelley Scown =

Australian singer, musician and educator

Shelley Scown is an Australian singer, musician and educator who has contributed widely to the Australian and Indigenous music industry.

== Biography ==
Scown is probably best known for her 1997 Jazz album, Angel with Paul Grabowsky Trio. She collaborated with other respected Australian musicians, such as Paul Grabowsky, Bernie McGann, The Groovematics and Kate Ceberano. The album was nominated for an ARIA music award in 1998, but lost to The Future of Today by Chaplin, Tinkler, Rex, & Lamble.

As well as working on stage, Scown has also worked in film. Her credits include: Turn It Up (1991) (an unscreened television series pilot co-starring Marg Downey, Lisa McCune and Glenn Robbins; she appeared as a character called Carsonette), Lucky Break (1994) (with Gia Carides and Anthony LaPaglia; she played a lounge singer at a resort) and as a member of the music department where she was a lead vocalist in Noah's Ark (1999).

== Discography ==
=== Albums ===
Title	Details	Peak chart positions
Title	Details	AUS
Angel (with The Paul Grabowsky Trio)	Released: 1997; Label: ORIGiN (OR 025)	—

== Other works ==
Scown did the vocal work of the instance of the song "Chinsagu no Hana" used in the Australian film Japanese Story.

== Awards and nominations ==
=== ARIA Awards ===
The ARIA Music Awards are annual awards, which recognises excellence, innovation, and achievement across all genres of Australian music. They commenced in 1987.

Year	Nominee / work	Award	Result
1998	Angel (with The Paul Grabowsky Trio)	Best Jazz Album	Nominated

=== Mo Awards ===
The Australian Entertainment Mo Awards (commonly known informally as the Mo Awards), were annual Australian entertainment industry awards. They recognise achievements in live entertainment in Australia from 1975 to 2016. Shelley Scown won one award in that time. and the Comedy Star of The Year award.

Year	Nominee / work	Award	Result (wins only)
1997	Shelley Scown	Jazz Vocal Performer of the Year	Won
