= Mammoth Mammoth =

Australian band

- Origin: Melbourne, Australia
- Genres: Heavy rock, stoner rock, murder fuzz
- Years active: 2006-present
- Labels: Napalm Records; Golden Triangle
- Members: Ben 'Cuz' Couzens; Frank 'Bones' Trobbiani; Gareth 'Gash' Sweet
- Past members: Mikey Tucker; Marco Gennaro; Kris Sinister; Simon Jaunay; Pete Bell
- Website: www.mammothmammoth.com

Mammoth Mammoth (often stylized as MAMMOTH MAMMOTH) are an Australian hard rock/stoner rock band that formed in 2006 in Melbourne. The band independently released their self-titled debut EP in June 2008 through their label, Golden Triangle, and followed this with a full-length album titled "Volume II: Mammoth" in August 2009.

In November 2012, their third album Volume III: Hell’s Likely was released, and after good sales and recognition in Europe They signed with Austrian/German label Napalm Records. Mammoth Mammoth's sound has been likened to "Motorhead doing mushrooms with Black Sabbath backstage at a Butt Hole Surfers concert".

The band are known for their raucous, live shows; Heavy Magazine Australia said, "their live reputation precedes them ... Mikey Tucker knows no boundaries and goes in hard every time; throwing himself off the stage and throughout the crowd." Mammoth Mammoth have been banned from performing at two music venues in Melbourne. According to an interview in the blog Riff media, Tucker fell through a glass window at The Tote Hotel after head-butting it to get the attention of concert attendees smoking outside. He then continued the show covered in blood.

Mammoth Mammoth describe their songwriting style as "four guys in a boxing ring with no referee".

== Career ==
=== Background and name ===
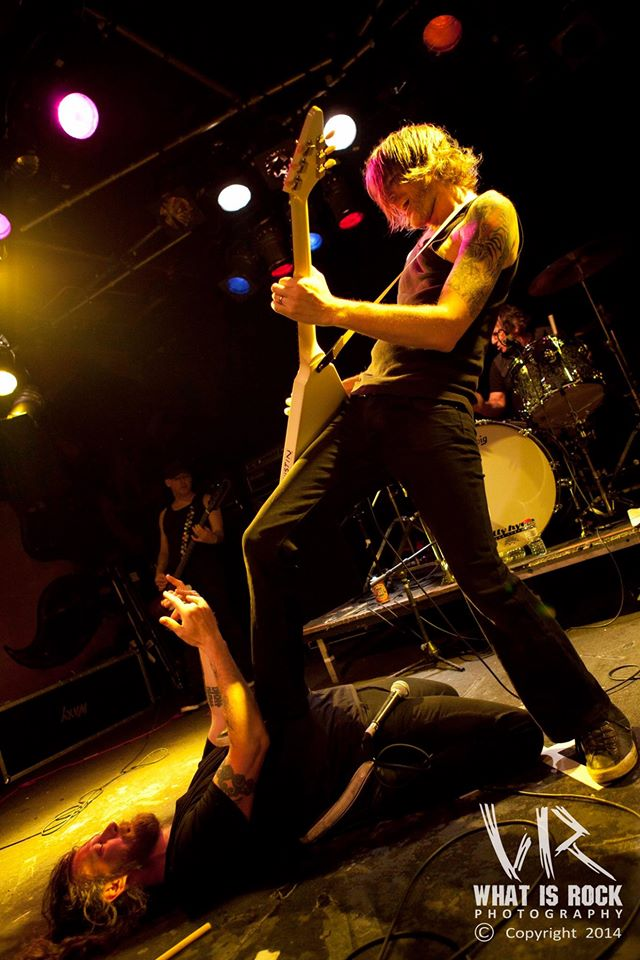
Couzens and Tucker

Mammoth Mammoth were formed by Ben 'Cuz' Couzens and Gareth 'Gash' Sweet as a result of their growing boredom with the Melbourne rock scene, which they saw as being full of "shoe-gazing indie-rock bands doing very little to entertain or commit". They describe themselves as "a heavy rock band from Melbourne Australia that smash the shit out of their stoner, glam, doom, punk and psychedelic rock influences". The band name is derived from the name of the woolly mammoth, stemming from their desire to have a band with the "biggest" name they could think of. Couzens and Trobbiani were previously co members of Melbourne rock band Furious Dragon Love; at that same time Couzens was working on a side project with friend and bassist Gareth "Gash" Sweet. Tucker was invited to join on vocals after his band Black Fang broke up, while former bandmate Trobbiani was recruited to play drums, forming the original Mammoth Mammoth line-up in October 2007. Tucker served as the band’s lead vocalist across all of its studio releases to date and international tours.

=== 2008: Volume I: Mammoth Mammoth EP ===
In 2008, the band recorded their debut EP before having played a live show. At their earliest most intense live shows the audience and the press were unsure whether the band's performance was satirical or sincere. In interviews, the band comments on their hands-on approach when creating their videos, concert posters, and album artwork.

=== 2009 – 2011: Volume II: Mammoth and line-up changes ===
In 2009 the band made their first appearance at the CherryRock Festival held in Melbourne's iconic laneway AC/DC Lane. In 2010, following the release of Volume II: Mammoth, their second self-titled album, the band toured Australia with fellow Melbourne hard rock band Airbourne and again played CherryRock Festival. Shortly after, Sweet left the band and was temporarily replaced by Simon Jaunay (Spiff) before they chose Pete Bell as the band's permanent bass player.

=== 2012 – 2013: Volume III: Hell’s Likely ===
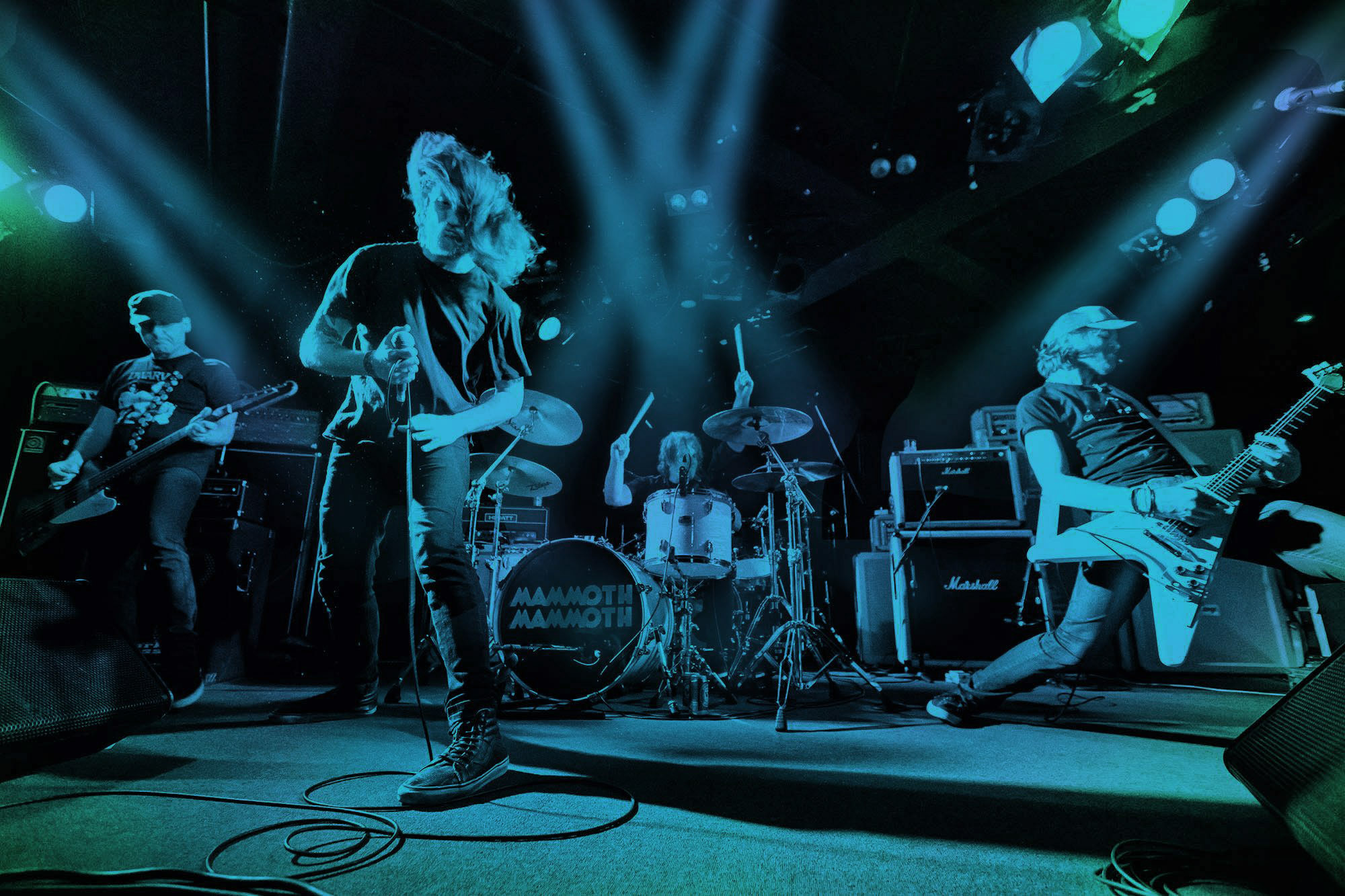
Mammoth Mammoth Live

Mammoth Mammoth created the basic outline for their album Volume III: Hell’s Likely over a continuous, three-day jamming session. They later recorded the album in two weeks at Toyland and Goatsounds Studios in Melbourne. They employed Jason Fuller, producer and bassist for Australian metal band Blood Duster, to work with them on the album. Guitarist Ben Couzens said working on material for the album meant the band "just played around with a bunch of jams."

In 2012, after the Australian release of Volume III: Hell’s Likely, Mammoth Mammoth were approached by Napalm Records and subsequently signed an international recording contract. The album was re-released internationally to positive reviews and the band supported it with their 2013 European tour. Metal Hammer magazine's German, French and UK editions voted Hell’s Likely number two for "album of the month" in December 2012. Mammoth Mammoth returned to Australia to play Melbourne's CherryRock Festival in AC/DC Lane, sharing the bill with fellow Australian hard rockers, Rose Tattoo.

=== 2014 – 2016: Volume IV: Hammered Again ===
In 2014, the band wrote and recorded their fourth studio album, Volume IV: Hammered Again. The first video release for the track Looking Down the Barrel is a tribute to Penelope Spheeris's The Decline Of Western Civilization Part 2: The Metal Years, in which W.A.S.P. guitarist Chris Holmes sums up the era as he is being interviewed while drinking vodka and floating in a pool while his mother watches.

The video's recurring theme is nihilism, which run through a number of the album's songs. On completion of the album, the band toured throughout Europe and alongside former Kyuss vocalist John Garcia and followed up with supports of U.S. doom legends Sleep.

=== 2016 – 2017: Mammoth Bloody Mammoth ===
In 2016, the band returned briefly to the studio to write and record an EP, Mammoth Bloody Mammoth. The album featured a cover of the MC5's Kick Out The Jams. The EP was supported with a European tour with label mates Green Leaf and My Sleeping Karma and shows in Australia supporting Hellyeah and Black Label Society.

=== 2017-2020: Volume V: Mount The Mountain and Kreuzung ===
The band's fifth full-length album, Volume V: Mount The Mountain, was released through Napalm Records in April 2017. The band toured Europe in April and May that year on the Mount The Mountain European Tour, with guitarist Simon “Spliff” Jaunay filling in while Ben Couzens was temporarily absent as he established a new business in Australia.

After Jaunay returned to Australia, further lineup changes occurred, with stand-in musicians Marco Gennaro and Kris Sinister joining the band to complete remaining shows that year.

In 2018, Gennaro and Sinister became permanent members and writing began on MAMMOTH MAMMOTH's sixth studio album, Kreuzung. The album was written over the summer of 2018 in Berlin and recorded later that year. The album’s tracks have since accumulated significantly higher streaming numbers on Spotify than earlier releases in the band’s catalogue.

=== 2021 - Present: Reunion and Volume VI: Warts n' All (live) ===
In August 2021, the band announced that they had reunited its classic line-up of Mikey Tucker, Frank 'Bones' Trobbiani, Ben 'Cuz' Couzens and Pete Bell for the first time in 4 years and would be releasing a live album. Due to on-going COVID-19 related issues, the release of the band's live album was delayed. In December 2022 the band played their first Australian show in six years with Nashville Pussy (USA). In 2023 founding vocalist Mikey Tucker and longtime songwriter departed the band after seventeen years fronting the group.. MAMMOTH MAMMOTH's live album "Volume VI: Warts n' All" was officially released in August 2024 with a limited number of gold LPs..

In December 2024, the band played their first official show as a three-piece with Couzens and Bell handling vocals as part of the 25th birthday celebrations of Melbourne's iconic Cherry Bar. In November 2025 the band embarked on their first tour of Japan. At the start of 2026 it was announced that Pete Bell had left the band and original founding member Gareth ‘Gash’ Sweet had returned on bass.

== Band members ==
- Ben 'Cuz' Couzens (guitars & vocals)
- Gareth 'Gash' Sweet (bass & BV)
- Frank 'Bones' Trobbiani (drums & BV)

== Discography ==
=== Albums ===
List of albums, with selected details
Title	Details
Volume II: Mammoth	Released: 2009; Format: CD, LP; Label: Golden Triangle Productions (GT666-02)
Volume III: Hell's Likely	Released: 2012; Format: CD, LP, Digital; Label: Golden Triangle Productions (GT666-03)
Volume IV: Hammered Again	Released: 2015; Format: CD, LP, Digital; Label: Napalm Records (NPR 573)
Volume V: Mount the Mountain	Released: April 2017; Format: CD, LP, Digital; Label: Napalm Records (NPR 711)
Kreuzung	Released: 2019; Format: CD, LP, Digital; Label: Napalm Records (NPR 871)
Volume VI: Warts n' All	Released: 2024; Format: LP, Digital; Label: Golden Triangle Productions (GT666-06)

=== Extended Plays ===
List of albums, with selected details
Title	Details
Volume I	Released: 2008; Format: CD, Digital; Label: Golden Triangle Productions (GT 66678-08)
Mammoth Bloody Mammoth	Released: 2016; Format: CD, Digital, LP; Label: Napalm Records (NPR 647)

== Awards and nominations ==
=== Music Victoria Awards ===
The Music Victoria Awards are an annual awards night celebrating Victorian music. They commenced in 2006.

Year	Nominee / work	Award	Result	Ref.
2017	Mount the Mountain	Best Heavy Album	Nominated	
