= Music Victoria Awards of 2017 =

Annual Australian music awards ceremony

- Date: 22 November 2017
- Venue: 170 Russell, Melbourne, Victoria
- Hosted by: Chris Gill and Lyndelle Wilkinson

Highlights
- Most wins: A.B. Original & King Gizzard & the Lizard Wizard (3)

The Music Victoria Awards of 2017 are the 12th Annual Music Victoria Awards and consist of a series of awards, presented on 22 November 2017. For the first time this year, the Best Regional Venue award was separated into of over and under 50 gigs per year.

Music Victoria CEO, Patrick Donovan commended this year's impressive talent saying, "Congratulations to all of the winners and nominees. We are very proud that many of these winners haven't just made an impact in Australia over the last 12 months, but acts such as Jen Cloher, The Teskey Brothers, King Gizzard & the Lizard Wizard and A.B. Original have been flying the Victorian flag overseas."

== Hall of Fame inductees ==
- Tony Cohen

== Outstanding Achievement Award ==
- Zo Damage

Zo Damage is music photographer. Her 365 Day Live Music Photography Project and book The Damage Report whereby she photographed a band or more daily for a year, wrapping it up with a sold-out exhibition and book launch at Arts Centre Melbourne.

== Award nominees and winners ==
=== All genre Awards ===
Winners indicated in boldface, with other nominees in plain.

Best Album	Best Song
**A.B. Original - Reclaim Australia**; Big Smoke – This is Golden; Cable Ties - Cable Ties; Jen Cloher – Jen Cloher; RVG – A Quality of Mercy	**King Gizzard and the Lizard Wizard – "Rattlesnake"**; A.B. Original – "January 26"; Cable Ties – "Say What You Mean"; RVG – "A Quality of Mercy"; The Smith Street Band – "Death to the Lads"
Best Male	Best Female
**Paul Kelly**; D.D Dumbo; Dan Sultan; Remi; Tim Rogers	**Jen Cloher**; Ali Barter; Freya Josephine Hollick; Meg Mac; Tash Sultana
Best Band	Best Emerging Artist
**King Gizzard and the Lizard Wizard**; A.B. Original; Cable Ties; RVG; The Teskey Brothers	**The Teskey Brothers**; Alexander Biggs; Amyl and the Sniffers; Cable Ties; RVG
Best Live Act	Best Festival
**King Gizzard & the Lizard Wizard**; A.B. Original; Cable Ties; Cash Savage and the Last Drinks; The Peep Tempel	**Meredith Music Festival**; Boogie Festival; Golden Plains; Laneway; Sugar Mountain
Best Venue (Over 500 Capacity)	Best Venue (Under 500 Capacity)
**Corner Hotel, Richmond**; 170 Russell; The Croxton Bandroom; Forum Theatre, Melbourne; Melbourne Recital Centre	**The Tote, Collingwood**; The Curtin; The Gasometer Hotel, Collingwood; The Old Bar, Fitzroy; Howler
Best Regional Venue (Over 50 Gigs a Year)	Best Regional Venue (Under 50 Gigs a Year)
**Workers Club, Geelong**; Baha, Rye; Barwon Club, Geelong; The Eastern Hotel, Ballarat; Karova Lounge, Ballarat	**Theatre Royal, Castlemaine**; The Bridge Hotel, Castlemaine; Meeniyan Town Hall, Meeniyan; Music On The Hill, Red Hill; Pier Bandroom, Frankston
Best Regional Act	
**Cosmic Psychos**; Benny Walker; Coda Chroma; D.D Dumbo; Freya Josephine Hollick	

=== Genre Specific Awards ===
Voted by a select industry panel

Best Blues Album	Best Country Album
**Fiona Boyes – Professin' the Blues**; Benny & The Fly By Niters – Watch Yourself; Dan Dinnen – Keep on Stirrin' the Pot; Lloyd Spiegel – This Time Tomorrow; White Lightning – Mongrel Blood	**Raised By Eagles – I Must Be Somewhere**; Big Smoke – Time Is Golden; Freya Josephine Hollick – The Unceremonious Junking of Me; Matt Joe Gow – Seven Years; Small Town Romance – Small Town Romance
Best Soul, Funk, R'n'B and Gospel Album	Best Jazz Album
**The Teskey Brothers – Half Mile Harvest**; Cookin' on 3 Burners – Lab Experiments Vol 1; Lance Ferguson – Raw Material; The Meltdown – The Meltdown; Silver Linings – So Good to You	**Brenton Foster – The Nature of Light**; Fem Belling – Now Then; Paul Grabowsky/Mirko Guerrini/Niko Schäuble – Torrio!; Senegambian Jazz Band – Senegambian Jazz Band; Speedball – We Have Moved
Best Hip Hop Album	Best Electronic Act
**A.B. Original – Reclaim Australia**; Birdz – Train of thought; Must Volkoff – Aquanaut; Pez – Don't Look Down; Remi – Divas & Demons	**Client Liaison**; Dom Dolla; Harvey Sutherland; The Journey; KLLO
Best Heavy Album	Best Aboriginal Act
**Divide and Dissolve – Basic**; Batpiss – Rest in Piss; Clowns – Lucid Again; Dødknell – Hatred. Absolute; Mammoth Mammoth – Mount the Mountain	**A.B Original**; Archie Roach; Benny Walker; Birdz; Dan Sultan
Best Global or Reggae Album	Best Experimental/Avant-Garde Act
**Lamine Sonko and the African Intelligence – Afro Empire**; Amaru Tribe – Amaru Tribe; The Bombay Royale – Run Kitty Run; George Telek, David Bridie & Musicians of the Gunantuna – A Bit Na Ta; Papa Chango – The Lost Moon of Bellaris	**Winter Sound School / Bridget Chappell**; Byron Scullin; James Hullick; Miyuki Jokiranta; Nat Grant
Best Folk Roots Album	
**The Mae Trio – Take Care Take Cover**; Jed Rowe – A Foreign Country; Jordie Lane and The Sleepers – Glassellland; Leah Senior – Pretty Faces; Sophie Koh – Book of Songs	
