= The Red Onion Jazz Band =

Australian musical group

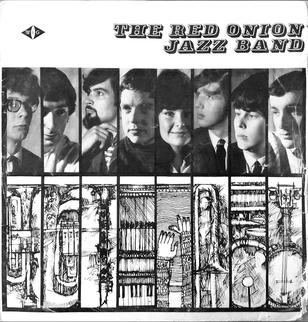
- Cover of the first LP by The Red Onions Jazz Band,1964. It includes portraits of band members in the year before they broke up and reformed. Art and Design by band member Kim Lynch

Background information
- Origin: Melbourne, Australia
- Genres: Traditional jazz
- Years active: 1960–74, 1983–96, 2008
- Labels: Elwood Audio Services Transcriptions, W&G Records, Swaggie Records
- Past members: see members list below

The Red Onion Jazz Band (c. 1960–2008) was a trad jazz band formed in Melbourne (Australia) in the early 1960s and was also known as "The Red Onions" and "The Onions".

== History ==
=== Formation ===
Inspired by the Yarra Yarra Jazz Band in 1960, The Red Onion Jazz Band was formed around 1960, as the Gin Bottle Jazz Band, by Allan Browne who was taking lessons from Melbourne University Jazz Band's drummer, Norm Hodges, and Brett Iggulden who was taking trumpet lessons from Ade Monsbourgh, then one of Australia's leading jazzmen. Browne recalls that the Yarra Yarra Jazz Band "were playing 200 metres from my house in Beaumaris; I went with my two oldest friends, Brett (Iggulden) and Bill (Howard) [. . .] We were 16 and it was becoming a bit passé to make model aeroplanes, so we went to this dance." The original lineup, drawn largely from the bayside Beaumaris, Sandringham and Brighton suburbs of Melbourne, consisted of Allan Browne, drums; Brett Iggulden, trumpet; Kim Lynch, tea-chest bass; Bill Howard trombone; Felix Blatt, banjo and John Pike, piano, while Brett's sister Sally (aka "Sweet Sal", who later married Browne and became a clothes designer) was an occasional addition on washboard. John Funsten, another pupil of Ade Monsbourgh, was added on clarinet. They played New Orleans inspired traditional jazz and infused it with their own vitality, their flair for presentation and promotion and zany sense of humour.

Jazz standards were the material for their first job at St Michael & All Angels Anglican Church hall dance in Beaumaris, and by about April 1961, they were given a brief spot at the Melbourne Jazz Club; their first introduction into the Melbourne jazz scene and in June Corrine Kirby included them on her ABC T.V. programme Let's Make a Date for which, at the insistence of Channel 2 executives a name change from their original Gin Bottle Jazz Band to the more respectable Red Onion Jazz Band was made, the title chosen in honour of an early Louis Armstrong recording group. They opened then at the 'Oxford' Jazz Club, where they continued for six months, with Fred Charles on clarinet.

=== Success ===
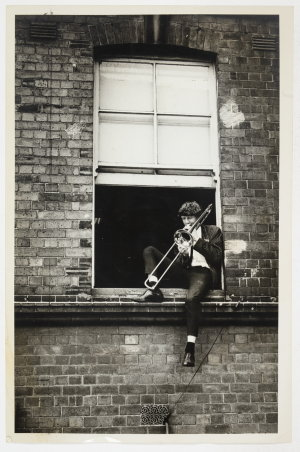
David Beal (1962) Bill Howard of Red Onion Jazz Band [plays trombone], Railway Institute Hall, Australian Jazz Convention, Dec 1962. Mitchell Library, State Library of New South Wales and Courtesy Tourism Australia

In November 1961, Geoff Thomas took over from Felix Blatt as banjoist and the band started the Red Onion Jazz Club in Brighton. They also played at the Downbeat Jazz Concert in 1962 before Fred Charles and Geoff Thomas left the band in October and were replaced by Gerry Humphrys (born Brian Anton Humphrys, 1941, in Battersea, England) and Rainer Breit (who had been playing together in a skiffle trio for about a year). After securing gigs at the Ormond R.S.L. Hall and Beaumaris Yacht Club, they joined the 17th Jazz Convention in Sydney in December 1962, where their long hair, formal wear, violins and mad vocals caused a stir.

Returning to Melbourne they played Friday nights at the 'Newport' Jazz Club at the Edithvale Life Saving Club and on Saturday nights at their own venue 'The Onion Patch' in Oakleigh. In early 1963, the group released their first 7" EP, An Impromptu Recital by the Amazing and Entertaining Red Onion Jazz Band on the tiny EAST (Elwood Audio Services Transcriptions) recording label, and it received conspicuous airplay on radio station 3XYs Jazz As You Like It program.

John Pike left in March 1963 and for 11 months the band played without a pianist, but had a busy year of concerts that included Moomba, Myer Music Bowl, a three-day tour of Tasmania including radio, T.V. and dance engagements in Hobart, as well as the 18th Australian Jazz Convention. The Red Onion Jazz Band at the 1963 Jazz Convention EP (their second recording) contains two vocal tracks; the bawdy sea-shanty "Barnacle Bill", and a version of Tampa Red and Georgia Tom's "It's Tight Like That".

Gerry Humphrys left the band for four months in June 1963, and Jerry Salt, Derek Miller or Eddie Robbins replaced his clarinet, while Brett Iggulden took up alto sax for special numbers. Venues then included the 'Driftwood' Club and the 'Downbeat' Jazz Club where in February the 17-year-old pianist Ian Clyne first sat in and thereafter became a regular member.

In July 1964, The Red Onions signed with W&G Records who put out a well-received EP entitled The Red Onions at Home and they transferred from the 'Onion Patch' to the popular 'Campus' Club. They appeared again on TV for GTV9 and ATV0, most importantly on Graham Kennedy's influential In Melbourne Tonight. In November the band opened at 'Opus' discotheque in South Yarra where it was estimated that more than 2,000 attended the first night. The entire band also featured at the 19th Jazz Convention in Newcastle.

Alan Browne, interviewed by The Australian Women's Weekly in May 1964, explained their style:

We call ourselves a revivalist group and we only believe in playing in the style of the jazz of the 'twenties — which, we think, was the greatest. We don't try to improve the jazz of the period, but just to capture the spirit in which it was played and to get back to the sound of that classic jazz era.

Asked why they called themselves the Red Onions, Browne said they took it from the Red Onion Jazz Babies - the group which Louis Armstrong recorded with back in the 'twenties.

=== After the split ===
In early 1965, The Red Onion Jazz Band released their self-titled debut LP. Its black-and-white cover art (see above) was designed by tuba player Kim Lynch, however in October, he and two other members, clarinetist, vocalist and occasional violinist Gerry Humphreys and Ian Clyne left, after three years of success, to play together the electric Rhythm and Blues that was beginning to eclipse jazz amongst younger audiences, especially after the visit of the Beatles to Melbourne in 1964. Humphrys, Clyne and Lynch went on to form the rock group The Loved Ones.

After this split The Onions' Brett Iggulden (trumpet and vocals), Bill Howard (trombone and vocals) and drummer Allan Browne persevered, joined by John Scurry (banjo and guitar) and Richard Miller (clarinet) in 1965. In 1967 the group left Australia for a 10-month, 50,000-mile tour of Europe. During the tour the band performed at the Jazz Jamboree in Warsaw, Poland, over October 1967, and at jazz clubs, ball rooms, jazz festivals and on radio. On return to Australia they continued to appear on television, at balls and discothèques, jazz clubs, university concerts and fashion parades.

Between 1974 and 1983 the Onions did not perform together. In 1983 they reunited in a benefit for Bill Howard who had lost his house and possessions in the Ash Wednesday bushfires. Thereafter they performed quite regularly, with festival appearances and occasional gigs in Melbourne. They travelled to Europe a third time in 1992, and released the CD Crisis shortly thereafter.

With Bill Howard's death from cancer in 1996 the Red Onions finally disbanded, with their last formal appearance at the Wangaratta Festival of Jazz and Blues. At this performance they featured their mentor and long time friend, Ade Monsbourgh.

A Red Onion Jazz Band exhibition was opened by Allan Browne on 7 August 2010 at the Victorian Jazz Archive.

A program on the ROJB in the 60s may be seen on YouTube.

== Members ==
- Allan Browne – drums (1961–
- Brett Iggulden – vocals, trumpet, alto saxophone (1961–
- Kim Lynch – tea-chest bass, tuba (1961–65)
- Bill Howard – trombone, vocals (1961–
- Felix Blatt – banjo (1961–63), piano (1972–1976)
- John Pike – piano (1961–63)
- Sally Iggulden – washboard (1961–?)
- John Funsten – clarinet (1961)
- Conrad Joyce – tuba, bass (1969–
- Fred Charles – clarinet (1961–62)
- Geoff Thomas – banjo (1961–62)
- Bill Morris – tuba (1965–1969)
- Gerry Humphrys – vocals, clarinet (1962–63, 1963–65)
- Robert Gibbs – trombone
- Rainer Breit – banjo (1961–64)
- Jerry Salt – clarinet (1963)
- Derek Miller – clarinet (1963)
- Eddie Robbins – clarinet (1963)
- Ian Clyne – piano (1964–65)
- John Scurry – banjo, guitar (1965–
- Richard Miller – clarinet (1965–
- Rowan Smith – Piano

== Discography ==
=== Albums ===
- Hot Red Onions – W&G Records (WG 25/2409) (1965)
- Big Band Memories – The Red Onion Jazz Band – White & Gillespie (W&G 25/5065) (15 February 1967)
- Creole Rhapsody – Swaggie (S 1247) (1969)
- Red Onions Live at La Brochette – His Master's Voice (SOELP-10200) (1974)
- Crisis – Newmarket Music (NEW 1015.2) (1992)
- In the Beginning 1962–1964 (2002)

=== EPs ===
- An Impromptu Recital by the Amazing and Entertaining Red Onion Jazz Band – Elwood Audio Services Transcriptions (EAS 002) (1963)
- The Red Onion Jazz Band at the 1963 Jazz Convention – Elwood Audio Services Transcriptions (EAS 003) (1963)
- Red Onions at Home – W&G Records (WG-E-1952) (July 1964)
- King Oliver Revisited – W&G Records (WG-E.2643) (1965)

=== Compilation appearances ===
- The Great Jazz Revival – Jazznote (JR 1) (1971)
- Jazz Band Ball – Swaggie (S 1250) (1969) ("Jungle Jamboree", "Rhythm is our Business" & "Black and Tan Fantasy")
