= Nan Bosler =

Australian community activist and writer

Nan Bosler AM is an Australian community activist and advocate for young people, the elderly and people with disabilities. She is an author and most notable internationally for her involvement with computer clubs and digital skills for older people. Bosler was associated with Girl Guides for more than 50 years in a variety of roles.

== Early years ==
Nancy Bosler was born in Strathfield on 24 January 1935.

== Education ==
Bosler attended North Sydney Girls High School. Bosler attended university as a mature-aged student aged over 50 and was successful in achieving a Diploma of Education (Adult Community Education) (1989); Diploma of Community Organisations (1990); Graduate Diploma Local and Applied History (1991 UNE) Bachelor of Education (Adult Education) (1993) and a Master of Local Government (1996) Diploma of Family History (2018 UTAS).

== Career and advocacy work ==
Bosler was instrumental in establishing long-running holiday programs for handicapped children in Sydney's northern beaches.

In 1997 Bosler founded the Australia Seniors Computer Clubs Association (ASCCA). She has represented ASCCA nationally and internationally and has been a member of the Cyber Security Awareness Week Committee, Broadband for Seniors Kiosk Consortium, Ambassador for Seniors Week (2013-2015), a member of the New South Wales Carers Advisory Council (2010-2014) and a National Cyber Security Awareness Ambassador, 2013.

Bosler was associated with the Girl Guides in many different roles for more than 50 years including serving as Assistant Region Commissioner, Division Commissioner, District Commissioner, Commissioner Trainer, Committee Member and Brownie Guider.

In 2019, Bosler was awarded a Member (AM) of the Order of Australia for significant service to seniors and to the community.

== Works ==
- Bosler, Nan; Aboriginal Support Group (N.S.W.), (issuing body.) (2011), The story of Bob Waterer and his family 1803-2010, Aboriginal Support Group-Manly Warringah Pittwater, ISBN 978-0-646-55334-4
- Bosler, Nan (2001), Cubby House Toy Library : a history 1979-2001, Cubby House Toy Library, ISBN 978-0-646-41098-2
- Bosler, Nan (1983), Macramé Australian animals & flowers, Kangaroo Press, ISBN 978-0-949924-36-0
- Bosler, Nan (1983), Christmas decorations in Australia, Kangaroo Press, ISBN 978-0-949924-72-8
- Bosler, Nan; Creative Leisure Movement (Sydney, N.S.W.) (1982), The Creative Leisure Movement (Children's Library and Crafts Movement), Creative Leisure Movement, ISBN 978-0-9599004-2-2
- Bosler, Nan (1991), The Ingleside Volunteer Bushfire Brigade, N. Bosler
- Craymer, Joan; Willcox, Jennifer, (author.); Bosler, Nan, (author.); Australian Seniors Computer Clubs Association, (issuing body) (30 October 2018), A celebration, Australian Seniors Computer Clubs Association (published 2018), ISBN 978-0-648-03651-7

== Awards ==
- 2019: Member (AM) of the Order of Australia for significant service to seniors and to the community
- 2017: Not-for-Profit Technology Lifetime Service Award
- 2013: Broadband Champion 2013, Minister for Broadband Communications and Digital Divide
- 2007: Adult Learning Australia Ambassador Award
- 2001: Centenary Medal, for 'service to the seniors community, including helping seniors to use information technology'
- 2001: Hall of Fame, North Sydney Girls High School
- 1999: Premier's Seniors Achievement Award
- 1992: Medal of the Order of Australia ‘In recognition of service to the community, particularly youth, aged people and to people with disabilities'.
