= Niko Schäuble =

- Born: 29 January 1962 (age 64); Stuttgart, West Germany

Niko Schäuble (born 29 January 1962 in Stuttgart, West Germany) is a German-Australian jazz drummer, composer, and sound engineer.

== Biography and work ==
Schäuble studied in Berlin with Manfred Burzlaff und Konstantinos Avgerinos among others. With Gebhard Ullmann, Andreas Willers, and Hans-Dieter Lorenz (later Martin Lillich), he founded the quartet Out to Lunch in the mid-1980s. He was also a member of the band Elefanten and led his own band Tibetan Dixie.

In 1989, he moved to Australia and has lived since that time in Melbourne. In addition to regularly performing with Paul Grabowsky, he has recorded with and composed for the Australian Art Orchestra and also with the Radiosinfonieorchester Frankfurt (now hr-Sinfonieorchester), the Berlin Jazz Composers Orchestra JJBC, and the Berliner Saxophon Quartet, as well as soundtracks for series and films such as Stingers, Zoo's Company, Bunch of Fives, Neighbours and Bed of Roses.

He has also taught at the Victorian College of the Arts, Monash University, and the Northern Melbourne Institute of TAFE.

Since 2012, he has managed "Pughouse Studios," where he works as a producer and sound engineer.

== Awards ==
- 1992 Australian Jazz Award/Best Drummer
- 1995 2nd prize Franz-Josef Reinl Stiftung for ʻOhne Endeʼ
- 1996 1st and 2nd Prize ʻTage der leichten Musikʼ des SFB
- 1997 Honorable Mention Julius Hemphill Awards, New York Further awards and grants by the Berlin Senate, the Victorian Ministry of the Arts and the Australia Council.

=== Music Victoria Awards ===
The Music Victoria Awards are an annual awards night celebrating Victorian music. They commenced in 2006.

Year	Nominee / work	Award	Result	Ref.
Music Victoria Awards of 2017	Torrio! (With Paul Grabowsky & Niko Schäuble)	Best Jazz Album	Nominated	
