= Australian Jazz Convention =

Annual jazz festival and convention in Australia

The Australian Jazz Convention is the longest running annual jazz event in the world.

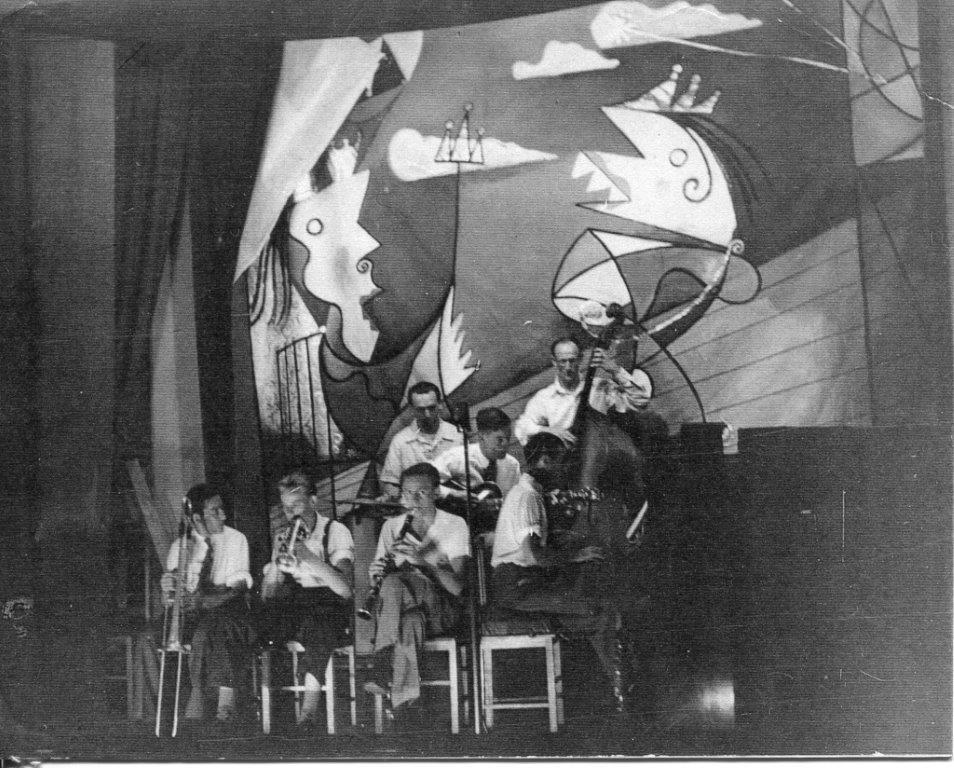
Frank Johnson's Dixielanders at 1st Australian Jazz Convention, Melbourne 1946

The idea for the event originated when Abe Monsbourgh was serving in the RAAF in 1944 and wrote to friend Cedric Ian Turner with an idea to run a “jazz convention” once the war had ended. The first Australian Jazz Convention was then held in Melbourne in December 1946, and was attended by musicians from across Australia. It was preceded by a one-off Sydney Jazz Week in 1919 as one of the earliest jazz events in the world.

The programme for the first convention in 1946 was printed as an Angry Penguins Broadsheet. The program contained an introduction from Graeme Bell, an article on Duke Ellington, and articles from international critics.

The jazz convention has since been held in different cities and states across Australia each year, with the 76th edition held in Newcastle in 2022.

The archives of the Australian Jazz Convention are held by the Australian Jazz Museum in Victoria. Volunteers at the museum have been digitising audio and video recordings of past events. The National Film and Sound Archive have also released recordings, including of 1949's convention, and have a video recording of the 1970 convention featuring Graeme Bell.

== List of conventions ==
Australian Jazz Convention
Year	City	Notes / References
1946	Melbourne	Recorded and later broadcast by radio
1947	Melbourne	
1948	Melbourne	
1949	Melbourne	
1950	Sydney	Part-broadcast by radio
1951	Adelaide	Part-broadcast by radio
1952	Melbourne	Recorded for radio
1953	Hobart	
1954	Sydney	Recorded for radio Excerpts released on record.
1955	Cootamundra (NSW)	
1956	Melbourne	
1957	Adelaide	Recorded for radio
1958	Sydney	Recorded for TV
1959	Cootamundra	
1960	Melbourne	
1961	Adelaide	
1962	Sydney	
1963	Melbourne	
1964	Newcastle (NSW)	
1965	Sydney	
1966	Melbourne	
1967	Hobart	
1968	Adelaide	
1969	Ballarat (VIC)	
1970	Dubbo (NSW)	
1971	Hobart	
1972	Adelaide	
1973	Queanbeyan (NSW)	
1974	Melbourne	
1975	Balmain / Sydney (NSW)	
1976	Brisbane	
1977	Adelaide	
1979	Freemantle	
1980	Forbes (NSW)	
1981	Geelong (VIC)	
1982	Toowoomba (QLD)	
1983	Forbes	
1984	Woollongong (NSW)	
1985	Ballarat	
1986	Adelaide	
1987	Armidale (NSW)	
1988	Sydney	
1989	Perth	
1990	Launceston (TAS)	
1991	Newcastle	
1992	Geelong	
1993	Adelaide	
1994	Gold Coast	
1995	Melbourne	
1996	Bathurst (NSW)	
1997	Launceston	
1998	Geelong	
1999	Perth	
2000	Forbes	
2001	Adelaide	
2002	Launceston	
2003	Forbes	
2004	Stawell (VIC)	
2005	No Convention	
2006	Lismore (NSW)	
2007	Adelaide	
2008	Goulburn (NSW)	
2009	Melbourne	
2010	Orange (NSW)	
2011	Bundaberg (QLD)	
2012	Forbes	
2013	Goulburn	
2014	Swan Hill (VIC)	
2015	Ballarat	
2016	Ballarat	
2017	Ballarat	
2018	Ballarat	
2019	Albury (NSW)	
2020	No Convention	
2021	Albury	
2022	Newcastle	
2023	Longford (VIC)	
2024	Mildura (VIC)	
2025	Mildura	
