= Ade Monsbourgh =

Australian jazz clarinetist (1917–2006)

Ade Monsbourgh AO
- Birth name: Adrian Herbert Monsbourgh
- Also known as: Lazy Ade; Father Ade
- Born: 17 February 1917; Melbourne, Victoria, Australia
- Died: 19 July 2006 (aged 89); Nathalia, Victoria, Australia
- Genres: Jazz
- Occupation: Instrumentalist
- Instruments: Clarinet; alto saxophone; tenor saxophone; trumpet; trombone; recorder

Ade Monsbourgh AO (1917–2006) is an Australian jazz musician known as "Lazy Ade" or "Father Ade". He was part of the trad jazz movement and primarily played clarinet and alto.

In the 1992 Australia Day Honours, Monsbourgh was made an Officer of the Order of Australia (AO) for "service to music, particularly jazz as a performer and composer".

== Hall of Fame ==
=== Australian Jazz Bell Awards ===
The Australian Jazz Bell Awards, (also known as the Bell Awards or The Bells), are annual music awards for the jazz music genre in Australia. They commenced in 2003.

Year	Nominee / work	Award	Result
2003	Ade Monsbourgh	Hall of Fame	inducted
