= Allan Browne =

Australian jazz drummer (1944–2015)

- Born: Allan Vincent Browne; 28 July 1944; Deniliquin, New South Wales
- Died: 13 June 2015 (aged 70) Melbourne
- Genre: Jazz
- Occupations: Drummer, composer
- Instrument: Drums
- Years active: 1960s–2015
- Labels: JazzHead, Newmarket Music
- Website: www.allanbrowne.alphalink.com.au

Allan Vincent Browne OAM (28 July 1944 – 13 June 2015) was an Australian jazz drummer and composer first known for his work in The Red Onion Jazz Band in the 1960s.

Browne won the ARIA Award for Best Jazz Album in ARIA Music Awards of 1990 and ARIA Music Awards of 1996 with Paul Grabowsky Trio.

Browne was awarded the Order of Australia Medal (OAM) in 2013 for service to music as a jazz musician, and to the community.

== Awards and nominations ==
=== AIR Awards ===
The Australian Independent Record Awards (commonly known informally as AIR Awards) is an annual awards night to recognise, promote and celebrate the success of Australia's Independent Music sector.

Year	Nominee / work	Award	Result
2010	Une Saison En Enfer	Best Independent Jazz Album	Nominated
2011	Shreveport Stomp	Best Independent Jazz Album	Nominated
2013	Lost in the Stars	Best Independent Jazz Album	Nominated
2015	Ithaca Bound	Best Independent Jazz Album	Nominated

=== ARIA Music Awards ===
The ARIA Music Awards is an annual awards ceremony that recognises excellence, innovation, and achievement across all genres of the music of Australia. Browne was nominated for six awards.

Year	Nominee / work	Award	Result	Ref.
1990	Jumping Jazz	Best Jazz Album	Nominated	
1995	Birdcalls	Best Jazz Album	Nominated	
1999	Sudden In A Shaft of Sunlight (as Browne, Haywood and Stevens)	Best Jazz Album	Nominated	
2001	East St Kilda Toodleloo	Best Jazz Album	Nominated	
2001	East St Kilda Toodleloo	Best Independent Release	Nominated	
2011	Shreveport Stomp (with Sam Anning & and Marc Hannaford)	Best Jazz Album	Nominated	
2015	Ithaca Bound	Best Jazz Album	Nominated	

=== Australian Jazz Bell Awards ===
The Australian Jazz Bell Awards, (also known as the Bell Awards or The Bells), are annual music awards for the jazz music genre in Australia. They commenced in 2003.

Year	Nominee / work	Award	Result (wins only)
2003	Collected Works – Allan Browne	Best Australian Classic Jazz Album	Won
2004	Allan Browne	Hall of Fame	inducted
2007	Five Bells and Other Inspirations – Allan Browne's Australian Jazz Band	Best Australian Classic Jazz Album	Won
2010	Homage – Sam Anning, Allan Browne, Marc Hannaford	Best Australian Classic Jazz Album	Won
2016	Ithaca Bound – Allan Browne Quintet	Best Australian Small Jazz Band	Won

=== Don Banks Music Award ===
The Don Banks Music Award was established in 1984 to publicly honour a senior artist of high distinction who has made an outstanding and sustained contribution to music in Australia. It was founded by the Australia Council in honour of Don Banks, Australian composer, performer and the first chair of its music board.

Year	Nominee / work	Award	Result
2001	Allan Browne	Don Banks Music Award	awarded

=== Music Victoria Awards ===
The Music Victoria Awards are an annual awards night celebrating Victorian music. They commenced in 2006.

Year	Nominee / work	Award	Result	Ref.
2013	Lost in the Stars	Best Jazz Album	Won	
2015	Ithaca Bound	Best Jazz Album	Nominated	

== See also ==
- Paul Grabowsky Trio
- The Red Onion Jazz Band
