= Gary Costello (musician) =

- Birth name: Gary John Costello
- Born: 1952; Sydney, Australia
- Died: 20 December 2006 (aged 53–54); Melbourne, Australia
- Genres: Jazz
- Occupation: Musician
- Instrument: Double bass

Gary John Costello (1952–2006) was an Australian jazz double bass player. He was a member of Paul Grabowsky Trio, which won the ARIA Award for Best Jazz Album in 1990 and 1996. He died aged, 54, after a heart attack.

== Discography ==
Barry Duggan, Allan Browne, Gary Costello

- L'Etranger (1997) - Newmarket

Gary Norman/Gary Costello

- Bebop Bros (2006) - Newmarket

=== See also ===
- Paul Grabowsky Trio
