= List of music venues in Melbourne =

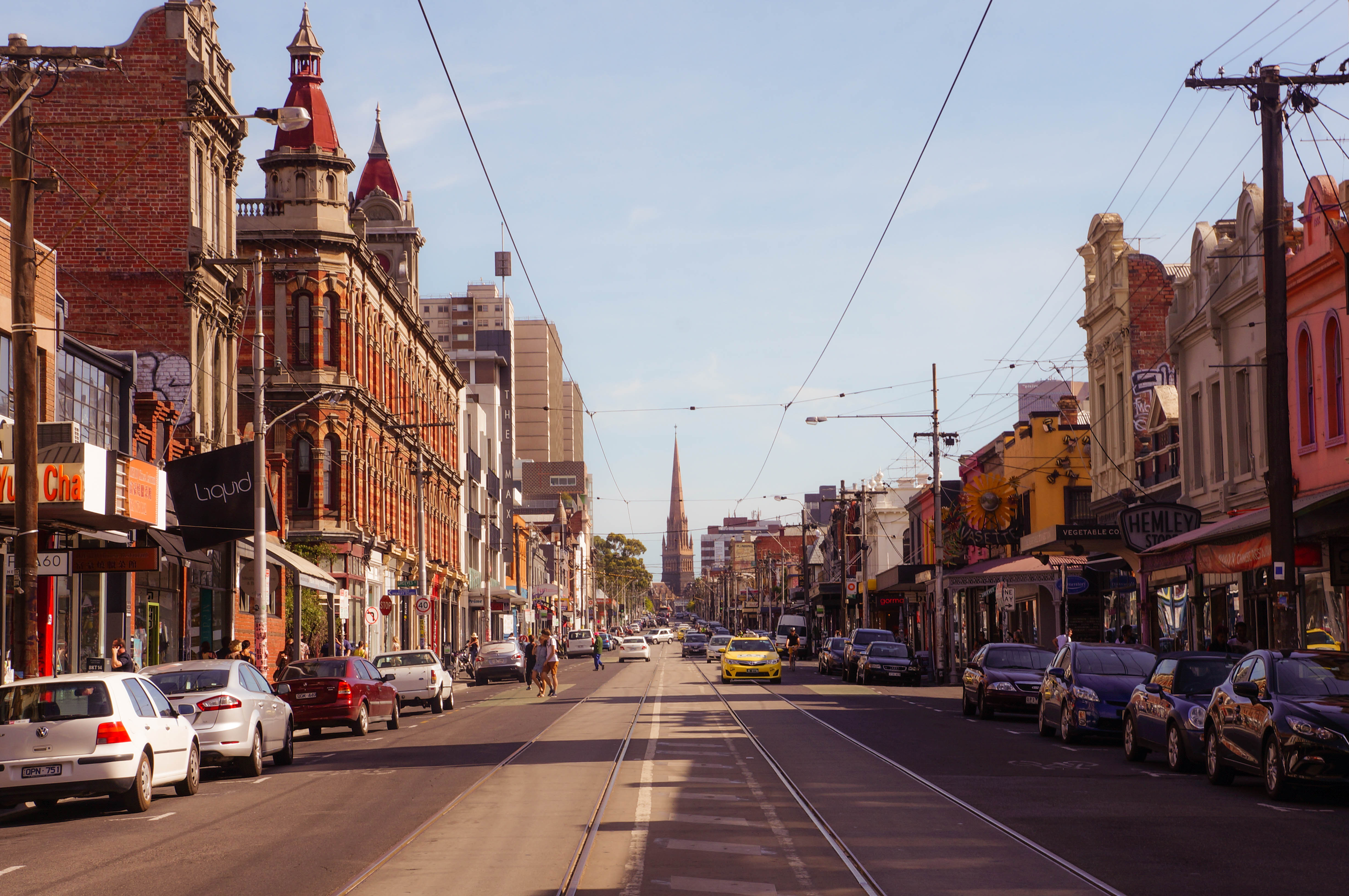
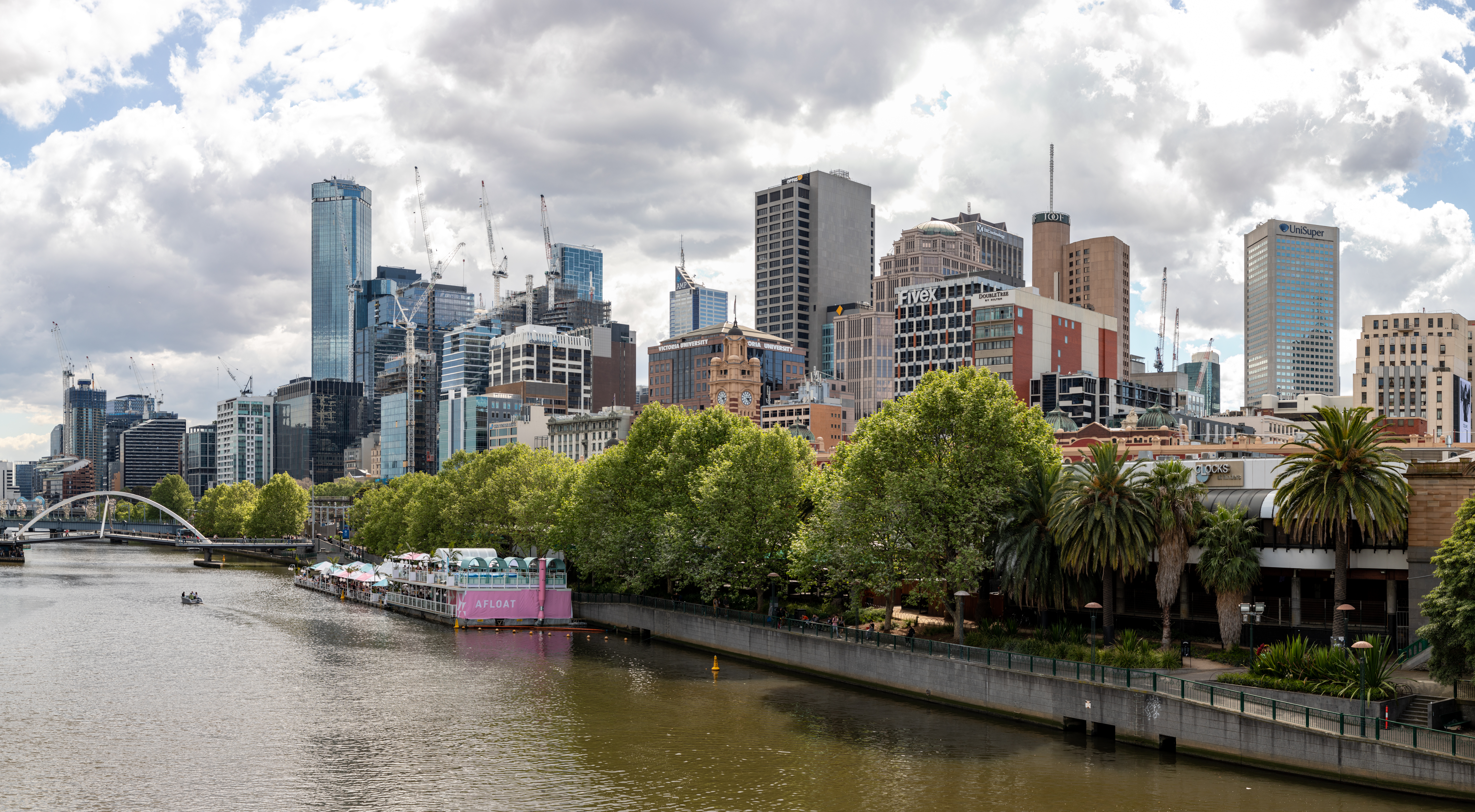
Brunswick St is known as a hub for Melbourne's independent music

The following is a list of notable music venues in Melbourne. Victoria has 2,441 live music venues, with 65% of them being within Melbourne.

The Melbourne Cricket Ground and other stadiums around Melbourne Park host large events, with the former venue being one of the largest in the world by capacity. Melbourne's pubs, bars, and nightclubs host many smaller artists.

== Large venues ==
The following music venues have a capacity of greater than 1,000 people. The entries in green are part of the Arts Centre Melbourne.

Venue	Image	Max. capacity	Description	Year opened	Suburb	Notes
Melbourne Cricket Ground		109,500	Outdoor cricket and Australian rules football ground with an official capacity of 100,024, but with a record concert attendance of 109,500		Jolimont	
Docklands Stadium		77,000	Australian rules football ground that can be reconfigured for concerts	2000	Docklands	
Melbourne Rectangular Stadium		32,000		2010	Melbourne Park	
Rod Laver Arena		15,000		1988	Melbourne Park	
John Cain Arena		11,000		2000	Melbourne Park	
Margaret Court Arena		11,500		1988	Melbourne Park	
Sidney Myer Music Bowl		11,000		1959	Kings Domain	
Festival Hall		5,400		1913	West Melbourne	
PICA		5,500	Port Melbourne Industrial Centre for the Arts		Port Melbourne	
Palais Theatre		2,900		1927	St Kilda	
Hamer Hall		2,500		1982	Southbank	
State Theatre		2,000		1984	Southbank	
Forum Theatre		2,000		1929	Melbourne CBD	
Northcote Theatre		1,500	Converted heritage-listed former cinema	1912; (cinema); 2022; (music)	Northcote	
The Timber Yard		1,500	Repurposed furniture fabrication factory, often used for EDM events		Port Melbourne	
Elisabeth Murdoch Hall		1,000		2009	Southbank	
170 Russell		1,000	Basement entertainment venue of heritage-listed Total House	1980	Melbourne CBD	

== Small venues ==
The following music venues have a capacity of between 150 and less than 1,000 people. The entries in green are part of the Arts Centre Melbourne.

Venue	Image	Max. capacity	Description	Year opened	Suburb	Notes
The Playhouse		884	Dual tier Musical Theatre venue, located inside Arts Centre Melbourne	1984	Melbourne CBD	
Max Watt's		850		2015	Melbourne CBD	
Frankston Arts Centre		800		1995	Frankston	
Corner Hotel		800		1871	Richmond	
The Tote Hotel		400		1981	Collingwood	
Fairfax Studio		376			Melbourne CBD	
The John Curtin Hotel		300			Carlton	
Victorian Trades Hall		261	Headquarters of the Victorian Trades Hall Council; also hosts performances		Carlton	
Chapel Off Chapel		255		1995	Prahran	
Cherry Bar		250			Melbourne CBD	
The Old Bar		175		2001	Fitzroy	
The Show Room		150			Melbourne CBD	
Esplanade Hotel					St Kilda	
Miscellania			Nightclub known for alternative electronic music	2021	Melbourne CBD	
Prince of Wales Hotel					St Kilda	
Punters Club				1987	Fitzroy	
Revolver Upstairs					Prahran	
Section 8				1861	Melbourne CBD	
Smith St. Hotel				1861	Collingwood	
Solace Bar				2025	Melbourne CBD	

== Defunct venues ==
The following venues were once music venues and are now either no longer extant or repurposed for other use.

Venue	Image	Description	Opened	Closed	Suburb
Bennetts Lane Jazz Club			1992	2017	
Bombay Rock		Destroyed by a fire in 1991	1977	1991	
Champion Hotel					
Crystal Ballroom			1978	1987	
Dallas Brooks Hall			1969	2015	
Empress Hotel		Still operating; no longer a music venue	1873	2015	
Greyhound Hotel		Closed and demolished in 2017	1853	2017	
Mansion nightclub					
The Palace			1972	2007	
Palace Theatre					
T. F. Much Ballroom			1970	1974	
The Troubadour			1978	1990	
Red Bennies			2010	2014	
Melba Spiegeltent			Moving tent permanently hosted at the Collingwood Yards; hosts circus, cabaret, comedy, theatre and live music		Collingwood

== See also ==
- List of music venues
- Music of Melbourne
