= B.East =

Australian burger chain

- Address: 80 Lygon St, Brunswick East; Melbourne; Australia

Construction
- Opened: 2012

Website
- https://www.theb-east.com/

B.East is a hamburger chain in Melbourne, Australia. In addition to food service, it is known for operating as a live venue for music and comedy.

== Description ==
The chain has been described as "part pub", "part diner", with a grungy atmosphere. Most nights have live music. It is also known in Melbourne, Australia, for its regular hosting of an annual chilli-eating competition.

== History ==
The chain is owned by Maz Salt, a publican also known for his role in establishing the music venues Section 8, and Ferdydurke.

It has three locations. The original Brunswick East location opened in 2012 on Lygon St. Another CBD location opened on Little Bourke street some years later, and a Fitzroy location opened in 2020.

Prior to operating as a burger restaurant, the location housed a Turkish restaurant also owned by Salt.

== See also ==
- Camillo Ippoliti
- College Dropout (restaurant)
- List of hamburger restaurants
