= (When the Sun Sets over) Carlton =

2014 compilation album

Compilation album by various artists
- Released: 2014

(When the Sun Sets over) Carlton is a compilation double album released in 2014 composed of songs from Australian bands from Melbourne's 1970's "countercultural scene". Bands and musicians featured on the double album include Skyhooks, early versions of The Sports, and Jane Clifton's band "Stiletto".
