= Maz Salt =

Maz Salt is an Australian impresario and restaurateur. His venues are in Melbourne and Sydney in Australia.

He is known in part for his role in establishing prominent hospitality businesses, including the venue Section 8, Ferdydurke, and the burger chain B.East.

== Career ==
Salt first gained prominence for establishing Section 8 in 2006. The bar was built inside a shipping container relocated onto a disused Chinatown car park. The venue has since become one of Melbourne's prominent music venues, regularly hosting laneway festival shows.

In 2012 he established two venues, the burger chain B.East in Brunswick East, and a neighbouring venue to Section 8 named 'Ferdydurke', styled as a New York themed bar. In 2015 he opened Belleville, a venue inspired by a visit to Paris. In 2019 he took over the license of the nightclub Lounge, re-opening it under the name Radar. Other venues associated with Salt include Globe Alley, and Park Melbourne.

In November 2021 Salt announced all but three of his venues would be permanently closed, primarily due to strains associated with the COVID-19 pandemic. His remaining venues are Section 8, Ferdydurke, and B.East.

=== Ferdydurke ===
Ferdydurke is another bar operated by Salt based in Melbourne, Australia. The interior of the venue is themed after New York, and it was named for the polish novel. It opened in 2012, and neighbours Section 8 in Tattersall lane.

The venue hosted an event for the MEL&NYC festival in 2018. It hosted a wedding on the night same sex marriage was legalised in 2018.

== See also ==
- Camillo Ippoliti
- Music in Australia
