= Kia (DJ) =

Australian DJ

Kia is a DJ, producer, and record label owner, based in Melbourne, Australia.

She is the founder of 'Animalia', an Australian record-label.

As a producer, Kia is known for a production style that involves techno-adjacent psychedelic elements and elements from progressive house.

== Career ==
Kia (born Kia Sydney) in her early performance career spent time in Melbourne's underground scene, playing in abandoned warehouses, and parks in outer Melbourne. At the time she was known for her Techno and Drum and Bass selection. She later performed at notable local festivals such as Tabula Rasa, Hopkins Creek, Polyrhythm Festival and Inner Varnika. She became associated with the venue Miscellania through its Sunday party named Techworld.

In 2019 she launcher her label, 'Animalia', primarily focused on championing local Australian DJs and producers. In 2020 one of her tracks was released on Nous’klaer Audio, a Rotterdam-based label.
