= The Zorros =

Australian rock band

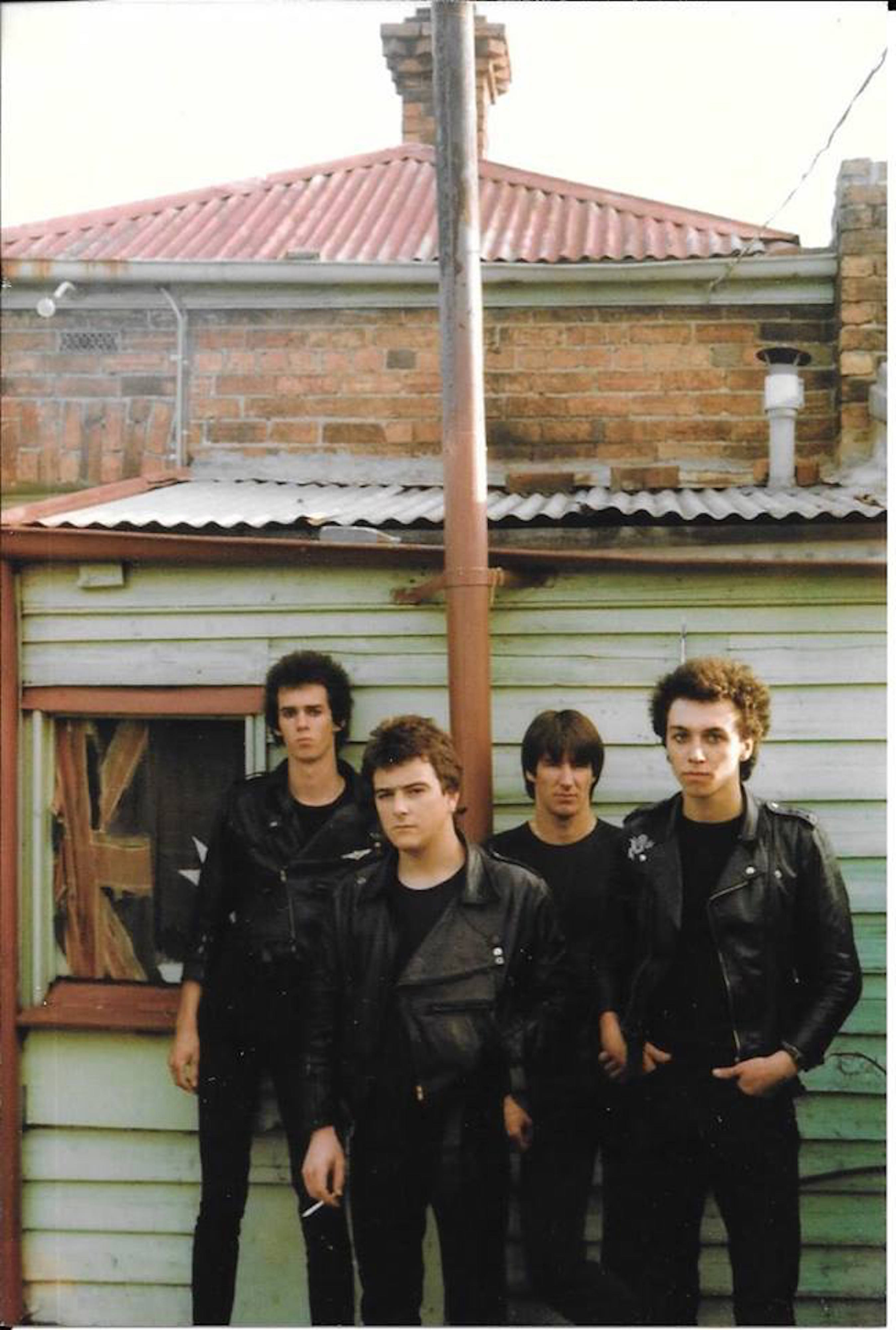
- Left to right: Nic Chancellor, Craig Russell, Greg Pedley, Darren Smith in Brunswick, January 1981

Background information
- Origin: Melbourne, Victoria, Australia
- Genres: Alternative rock, punk rock
- Years active: 1979–1994
- Labels: Au Go Go; Funnel Web/Dreamtime Software and Fantastic Mess Records
- Past members: see members list below

The Zorros were an Australian rock band formed in 1979, comprising Nic Chancellor on lead vocals, Darren Smith on lead guitar, Alex Zammit on bass guitar and Greg Pedley on drums.

== Biography ==
The Zorros were formed in Brunswick as a punk rock band by Nic Chancellor on lead vocals, Greg Pedley on drums, Darren Smith on lead guitar and Alex Zammit on bass guitar. They played their first gig at the Champion Hotel, Fitzroy in January 1980. Nic Chancellor was previously a roadie for 1970s punk band, the News, and a doorman at Bernhardt's Nite Club. Darren Smith played in the Proles. Andrea Jones of Rolling Stone felt that the group members were "very cynical about the softening of the new music. They are adamant that it will be rapidly followed by a resurgence in aggression and when that happens, The Zorros will be the front runners." Chancellor told her that "We get more of a kick out of playing. Hopefully we'll be round long enough to make a record. But it's a big thrill to play for an audience. It'd be an even bigger thrill to play and make money"

The Zorros were popular in the Melbourne music scene of the early 1980s, playing at numerous local venues such as the Crystal Ballroom, Bombay Rock, Brunswick and The Esplanade, St Kilda. In October 1981 released a 7" single on Au Go Go Records, "Too Young", written by Chancellor. It was mixed and produced by Tony Cohen (The Birthday Party), which went to number 3 on the Melbourne 3RRR charts.

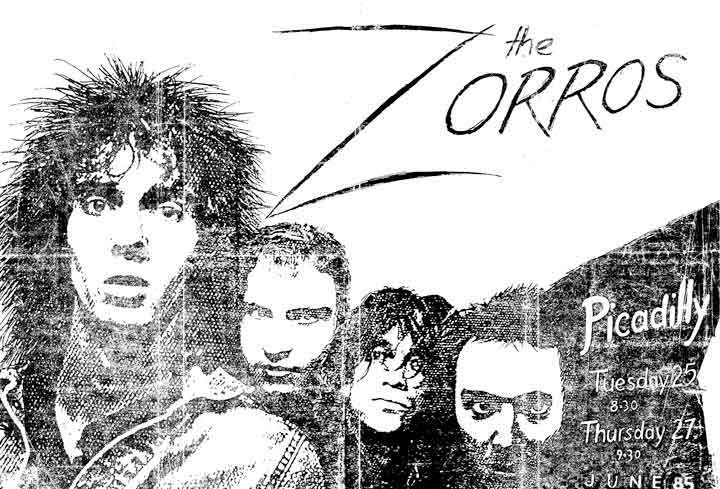
Nic Mark Tim Darren play King Cross.

In 1988 they released a self-titled, eight-track, EP via Funnel Web Records and Dreamtime Software on a music cassette.

They played at the final live performances at the Crystal Ballroom on 31 October 1987 and played at inner city venues such as Prince of Wales and the Esplanade until 1994. Evolving from Melbourne's indie rock scene, The Zorros played with other bands such as INXS, Rose Tattoo, 21 Faces, Z Cars, Marching Girls and La Femme. They played original independent music for 16 years with over 500 performances and over 500 songs written by Darren and Nic.

== Members ==
- Nic Chancellor – lead vocals, guitar, bass guitar (1980–94)
- Greg Pedley – drums (1980–81)
- Darren Smith – guitar (1980–94)
- Alex Zammit – bass guitar (1980–81, 1987–94)
- Craig Russell – bass guitar (1981)
- Phil Bryant – drums (1982)
- Scott Ferris – bass guitar (1982–83)
- Christine Paris: Bass Guitar 1983–1984
- Tim Dexter: Bass Guitar 1984–1985
- Mark Fleming: Drums 1984–1985
- Gary Williamson – drums (1982–83)
- Daniel Smith – drums (1983–94)

== Discography ==
- "Too Young"/"Let Me Love You" – Au Go Go Records (ANDA 016) (October 1981)
- Zorros (EP) – Funnel Web Records (KRC204), Dreamtime Software (1988)
- "Zorros Live 1980" 7" FMR 013 released JUNE 15th 2023 The Stranger, Black Widow Spider, Mesmerized, Too Young.
