= Music of Melbourne =

A Music Victoria study finds Melbourne hosts 62,000 live concerts annually, making it one of the live music capitals of the world. Victoria is host to more than three times the live performance national average, making it the live music capital of the country. Melbourne is host to more music venues per capita than Austin, Texas.

== History ==
The Esplanade Hotel, built in 1878, one of the earliest, largest and most prominent 19th century resort hotels in Victoria, has served as a venue for various styles through the 20th century. Between 1920 and 1925, the "Eastern Tent Ballroom" constructed to the rear of the site became an important jazz venue and dance venue in St Kilda, one of the main entertainment districts in Melbourne at the time. In the 1970s, the hotel's Gershwin Room, a grand dining room, was turned into a disco, complete with flashing Saturday Night Fever-style dance floor. Since the 1970s, it has hosted primarily rock-related acts and is currently the longest continuously running live music venue in Australia.

=== Liquor licensing laws ===
The Keep The Vineyard Live body, supported by figures including Mental As Anything's Greedy Smith, Molly Meldrum, Triple M radio's Mieke Buchan and Underbelly actor Damian Walshe-Howling, who together with SLAM, packed the St Kilda Town Hall chamber for an emotional council meeting on the matter. The rally attracted the attention of the state government whom, on 28 June 2010 at the 11th hour, sent an express letter to councillors indicating its support for the continuation of the St Kilda live music venue, and thus swayed the council's decision to retain The Vineyard Bar as a live music venue.

== Commercial industry ==
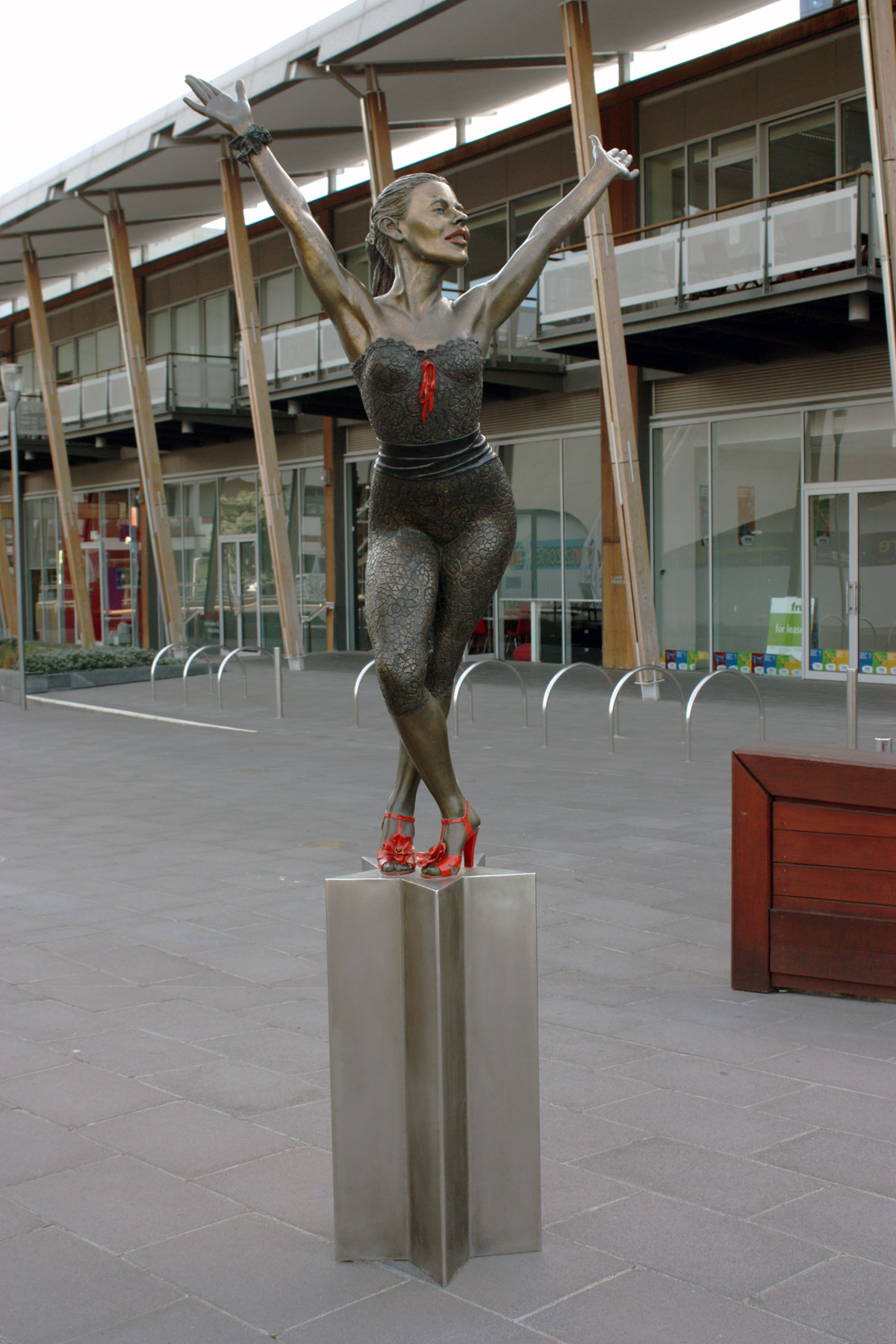
Statue of Kylie Minogue in Docklands

Melbourne has been home to numerous popular musicians. The 1960s gave rise to many performers including Olivia Newton-John, John Farnham, Graeme Bell, and folk group The Seekers. The 1970s and 1980s saw many acts getting their first big breaks on Melbourne's Countdown, including the Little River Band, Mondo Rock, Australian Crawl, The Uncanny X-Men and Crowded House who later wrote a song about the city of Melbourne called Four Seasons In One Day. Other Melbourne artists include Hunters & Collectors, Nick Cave, Flea (of the Red Hot Chili Peppers), Gotye and Something for Kate. Melbourne is also the home of music journalist and commentator Ian "Molly" Meldrum.

More recent notable Melbourne acts include Jet, Rogue Traders, Taxiride, Missy Higgins, Madison Avenue, Anthony Callea, The Living End and The Temper Trap. Singers who appeared on the Melbourne-based television shows Young Talent Time and Neighbours include Kylie Minogue, Dannii Minogue, Tina Arena, Jamie Redfern and Jason Donovan. Another Music TV show that began in Melbourne was Turn It Up!. It was first shown on Melbourne's Channel 31 and then relayed via satellite and rebroadcast terrestrially to major TV networks in over 22 countries. The show had the second largest viewing audience around the world, beaten only by the audience of American Bandstand. In one episode, the show presented Melbourne's annual festival Moomba to a world audience.

== Independent scene ==
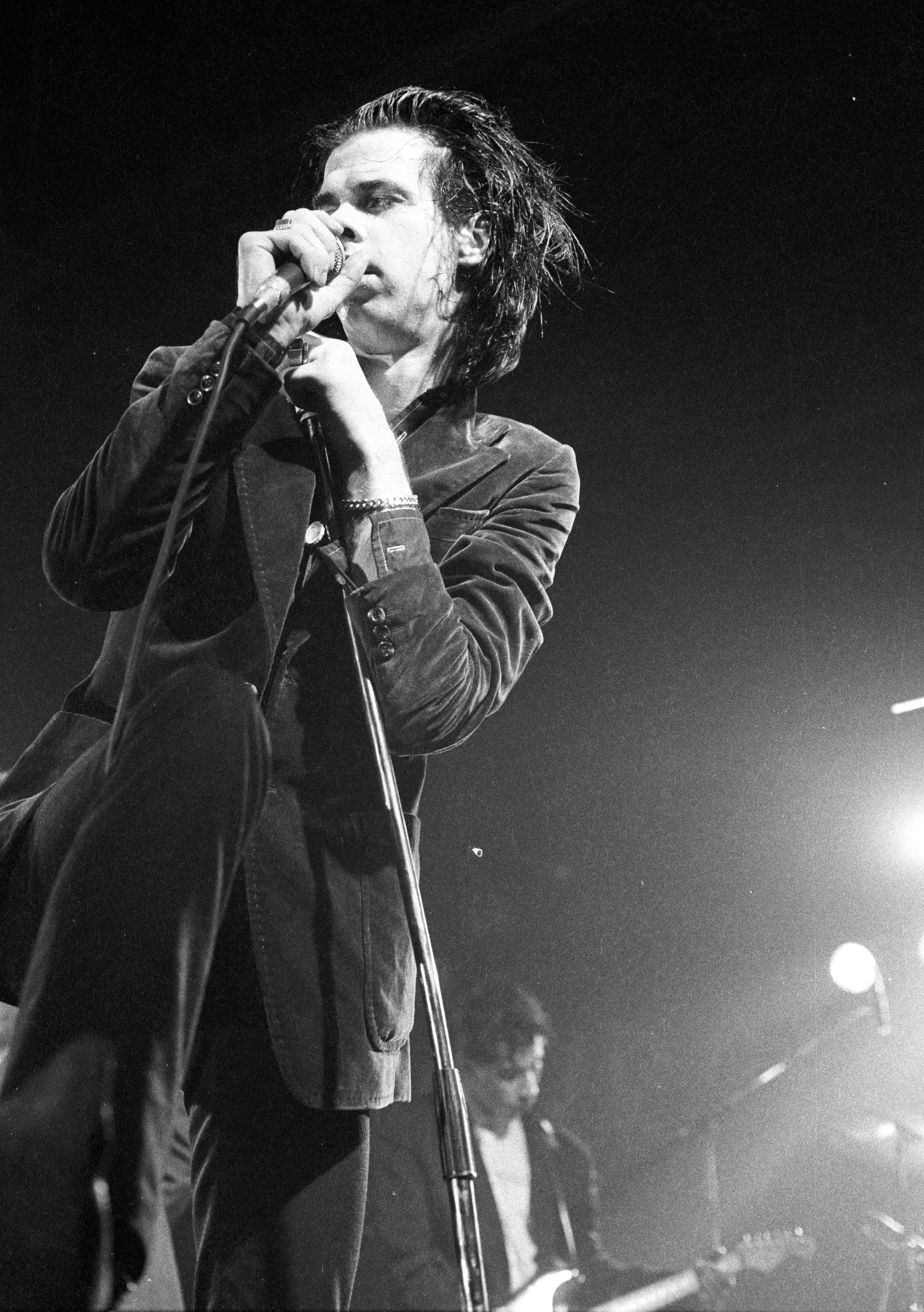
Nick Cave, vocalist for several independent Melbourne bands, performing in Belgium in 1986

Melbourne has an alternative, DIY, avant-garde, experimental and independent music scene. The scene includes music venues, independent record labels, music street press, and local community radio stations such as PBS, 3RRR, 3CR and SYN. Melbourne's independent music industry has been the subject of two documentary films, Sticky Carpet in 2006 and the DIY film Super8 Diaries Project in 2008. Alternative bands that emerged from Melbourne in the late 1970s and early 1980s include post-punk band The Birthday Party. One act from Melbourne, Dead Can Dance, a duo, mixed Dark Wave with classical music, thus founding the genre Neoclassical Dark Wave. Other notable independent artists from Melbourne include: Cut Copy, The Drones, TISM, Eddy Current Suppression Ring, Rowland S. Howard, Dirty Three, The Avalanches and The Great Elevator.

=== Little Band scene ===
The Little Band scene is the name given to an experimental post-punk scene which flourished in Melbourne's inner suburbs from 1978 until early 1981. Led by Primitive Calculators and Whirlywirld, the scene involved many short-lived bands which often changed names and lineups, sometimes on a weekly basis. Approximately 50 people were in playing little bands during the scene's creative peak, including members of Dead Can Dance, Hunters & Collectors and Boom Crash Opera. The scene served as the backdrop of the 1986 cult film Dogs in Space.

=== Dolewave ===
The term "dolewave" was coined in the early 2010s to describe a Melbourne indie scene featuring Dick Diver, Twerps, Scott & Charlene's Wedding, and other groups. Courtney Barnett later became associated with the scene.

== Venues ==
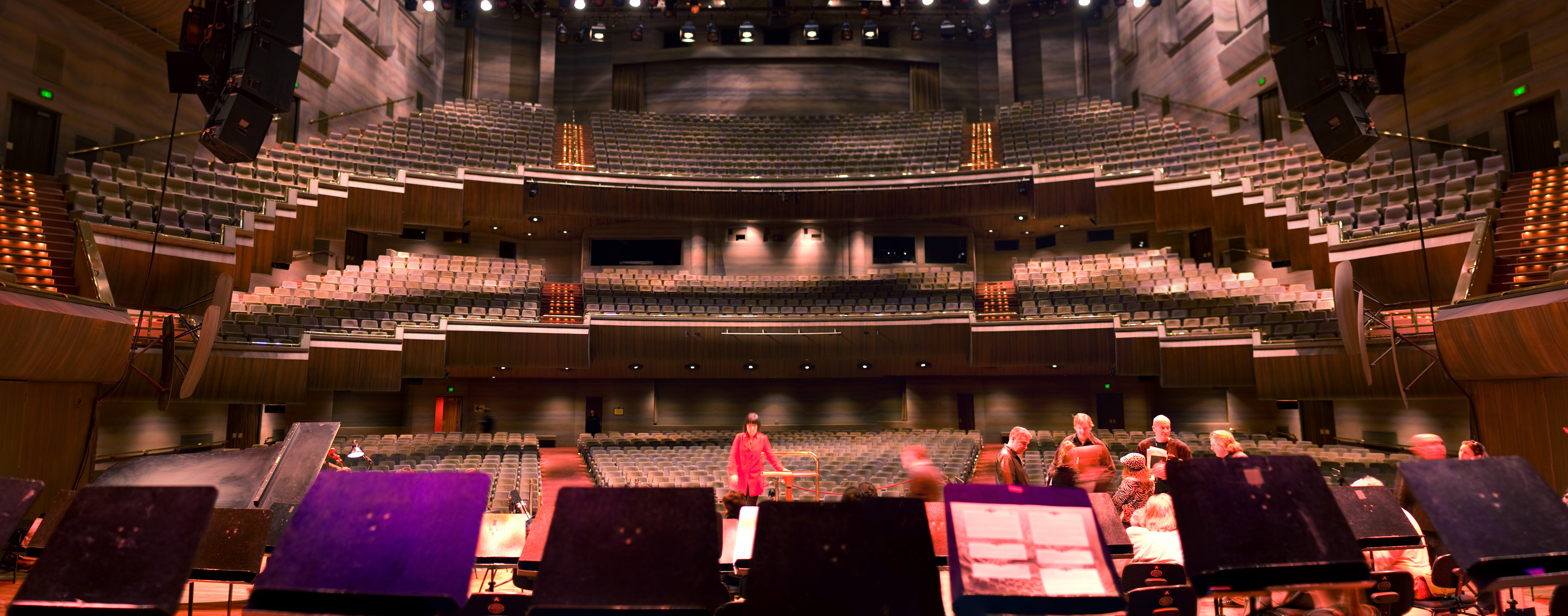
The interior of Hamer Hall, a 2,661-seat concert hall, opened in 1982

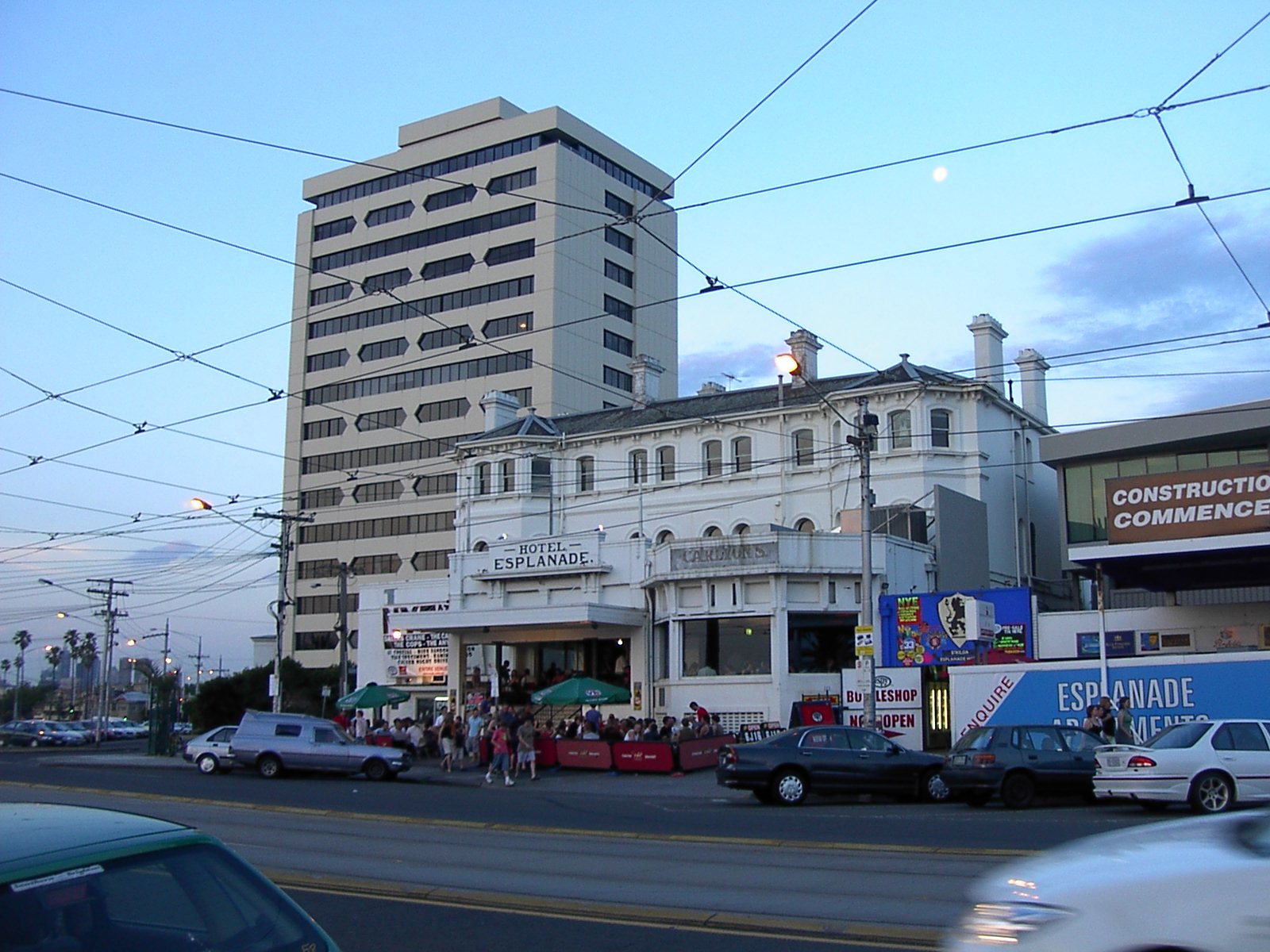
The Esplanade Hotel, St Kilda, built in 1878, is Australia's longest continuously running live music venue, serving as host to jazz, disco, punk and other genres throughout the 20th century.

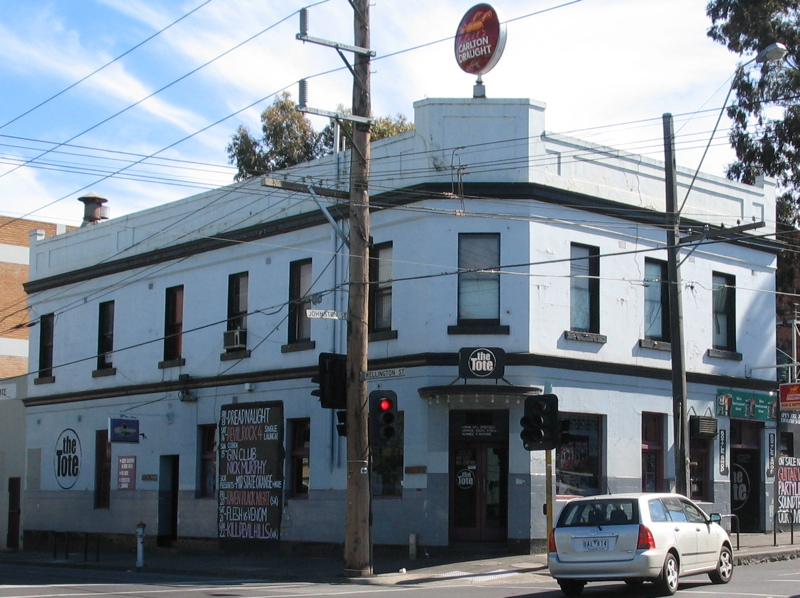
The Tote Hotel, Collingwood

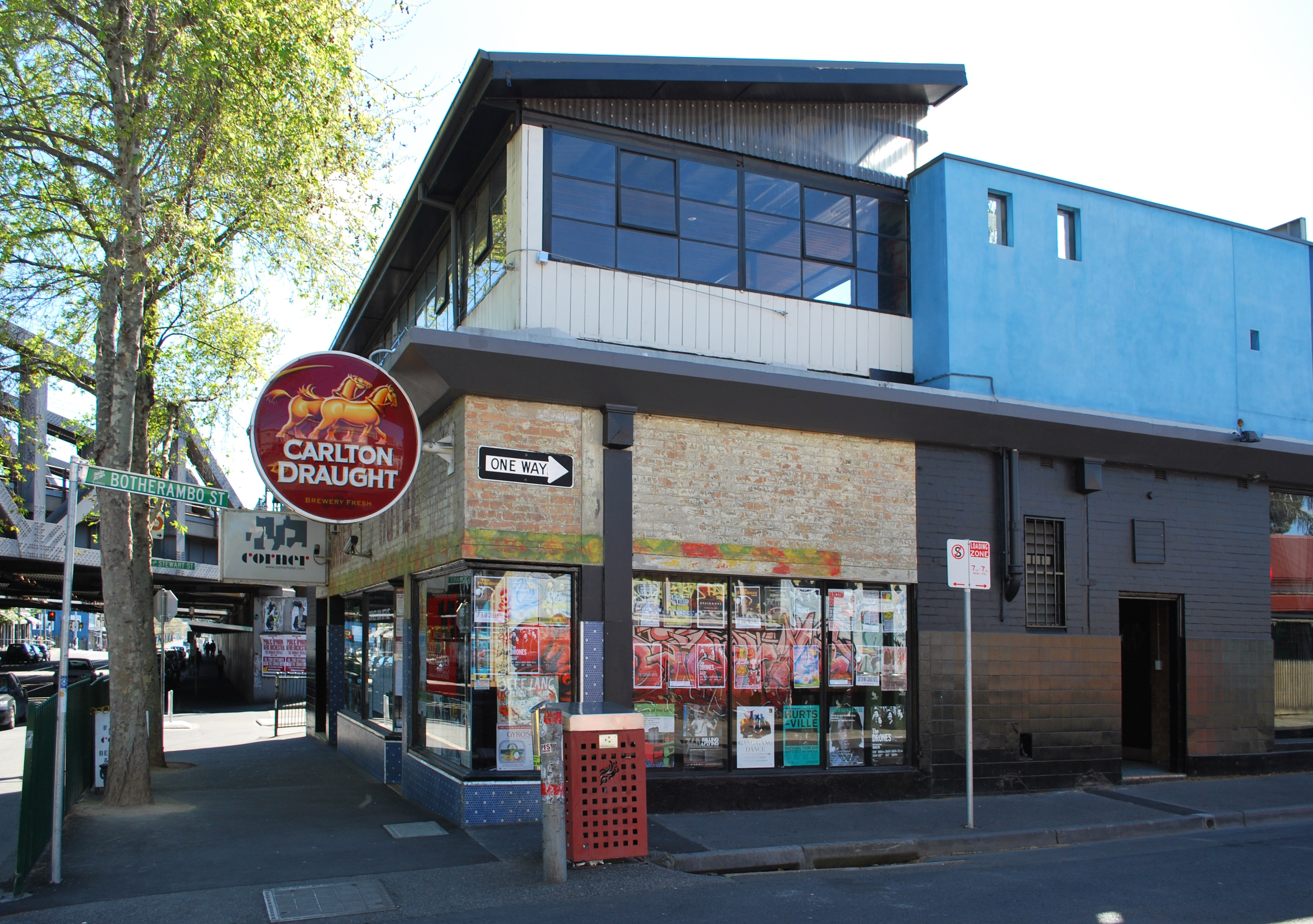
The Corner Hotel, Richmond

=== Stadiums, concert halls and outdoor venues ===
- MCG - 108,000
- Docklands Stadium - 56,347
- Rod Laver Arena - 16,200
- John Cain Arena - 11,000
- Sidney Myer Music Bowl - 10,000 - Fixed seats 2,030
- Forum Theatre - 2,000 standing (Forum 1). 520 seated (Forum 2)
- Melbourne Recital Centre 1,000
- Festival Hall - Seated: 1,741, standing: 2,600
- Palais Theatre - 2,896
- Abbotsford Convent - Abbotsford
- The Testing Grounds - Southbank
- Victorian Arts Centre (inc Hamer Hall capacity 2,261. State Theatre 2,079 and others)

=== Concert clubs ===
- 170 Russell- Capacity 900–1100
- Max Watt's (formerly The Hi-fi) - capacity 850
- Esplanade Hotel (The Espy) - St Kilda
- Corner Hotel, Richmond. Band room capacity is between 800 and 850.
- The Tote Hotel - Collingwood. Capacity 200
- Empress Hotel, Fitzroy North Has not had bands since 2013.
- The Old Bar - Fitzroy
- Cherry Bar - City
- Manchester Lane - City
- Bennetts Lane Jazz Club - City

== Festivals ==
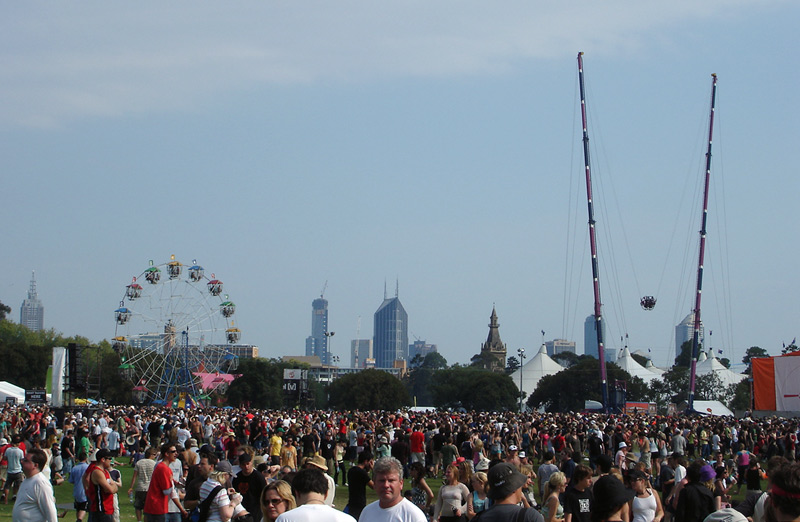
The Big Day Out music festival, held annually in Melbourne since 1993

- Melbourne Music Week
- Melbourne Festival
- Future Music Festival
- Melbourne Fringe Festival
- What Is Music
- Big Day Out
- St Jerome's Laneway Festival
- St Kilda Festival
- Sydney Road Street Party
- Melbourne Jazz Festival
- Melbourne Jazz Fringe Festival

== Publications and press ==
- The Music (previously Inpress) - street press / website
- Beat Magazine - street press / website
- Rhythms Magazine - Americana focused

== Local radio ==
- 3PBS, Progressive Broadcasting Service - progressive arts & music
- 3RRR, Triple R - local independent music
- 3CR - local community, activism & music
- 3SCB Southern Melbourne - aussie music
- 3KND, Kool N' Deadly - Indigenous Australian radio
- SYN FM, Student Youth Network - student & youth
- 3ZZZ - multicultural community
- 3JOY - gay & lesbian
- 3MBS - classical & jazz

== Instrument manufacturers ==
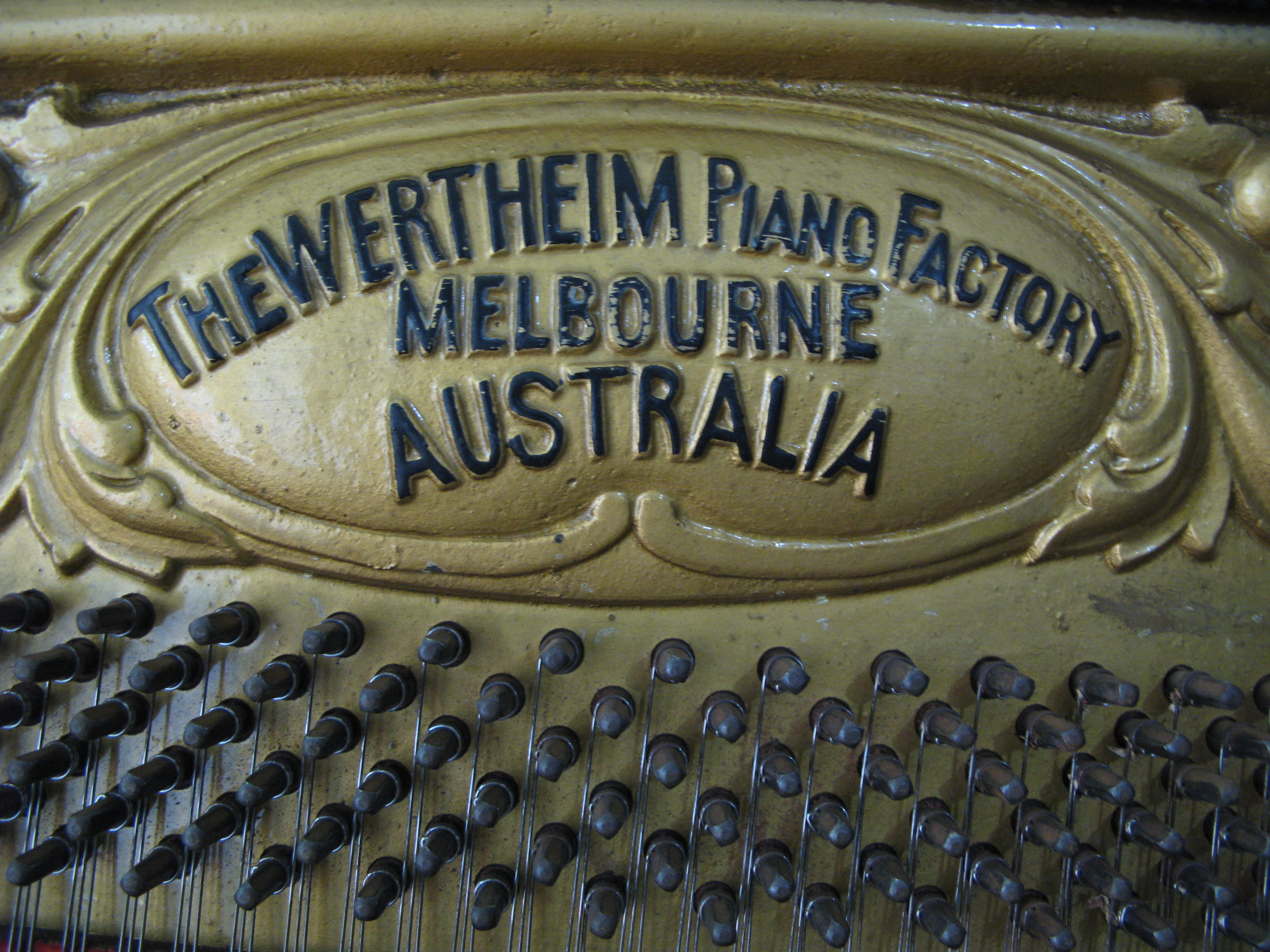
Wertheim casting logo

- Cole Clark - guitars, since 200?
- Maton Guitars - guitars, since 1946
- Wertheim Pianos - pianos, from 1908 to 1935
- Wayne Guitars - Guitars, 1930s-50s?
- Belman Guitars - Electric Guitars and Basses early 2000s?
- Ulbrick Amps - Guitar amplifiers and Pedals 200?-201?
- Goldentone Amps - Guitar Amplfiers 1960s?

== In media ==
=== Popular songs ===
Many musical acts have written music with their origins, suburbs or Melbourne in general as their subject matter. Singer Paul Kelly wrote songs about the city, including "Leaps and Bounds" and "From St Kilda to King's Cross", while bands like Australian Crawl and Skyhooks wrote some more tongue-in-cheek songs about Melbourne; "Balwyn Calling", "Carlton (Lygon Street Limbo)" and "Toorak Cowboy" are examples. The Living End wrote a song entitled "West End Riot" about differences between eastern and western suburbs in Melbourne's inner city.

=== Film ===
- Dogs in Space (1986) - portraying 1978
- Sticky Carpet (2006) - documenting the early first decade of the 21st century

=== Television ===
- Countdown - live music and music videos, filmed in Melbourne and broadcast Australia-wide 1974–1987.
- RocKwiz - an SBS music quiz show, filmed in Melbourne and broadcast Australia-wide since 2005
- Spicks and Specks - an ABC music quiz show, filmed in Melbourne and broadcast Australia-wide since 2005

== See also ==
- Australian Institute of Music
- List of songs about Melbourne
- List of music venues in Melbourne
- Martin Martini and the Bone Palace Orchestra
- Music of Australia
- Culture of Australia
- Culture of Melbourne
