= Bombay Rock =

Music venue in Victoria, Australia

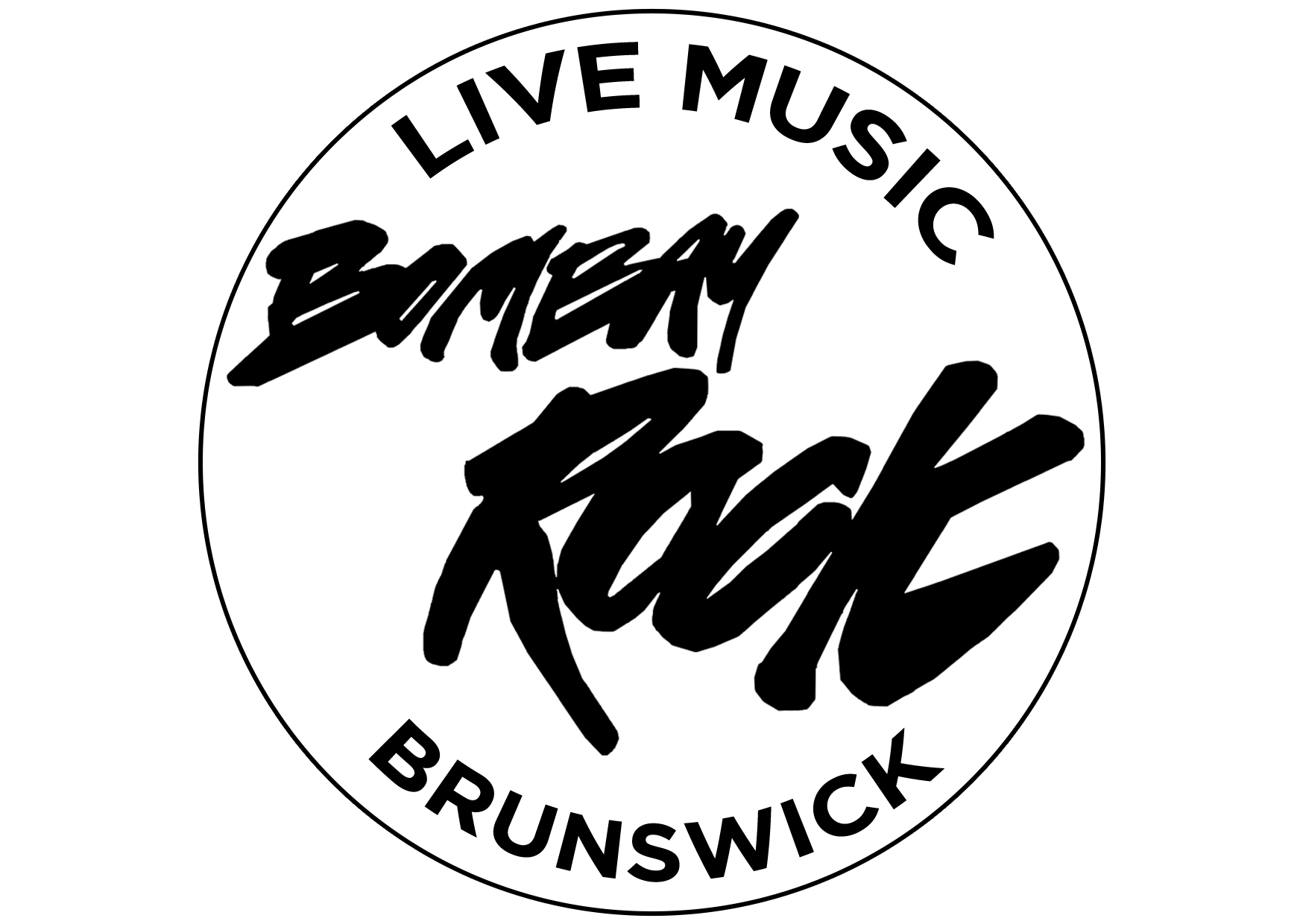
- Bombay Rock Logo
- Interactive map of Bombay Rock
- Address: 303 Sydney rd (entrance via Phoenix st); Melbourne; Australia
- Coordinates: 37.770465°S 144.96117°E
- Owner: Peter Iwaniuk

Construction
- Opened: July 2018
- Closed: Dec 2019

Website
- http://bombayrock.com.au

The Bombay Rock was a rock music venue located on Sydney Road, Brunswick, Victoria, Australia, which originally ran from 1977 until it was destroyed by a fire in 1991. The venue had previously been located in Bourke Street in the city under the name of the Bombay Bicycle Club. Operated by Joe Gualtieri, it was described in the 1980s as "…an old style rock barn … with all the style and grace of a converted factory" and was to the working class, what Billboard was to the middle class.

The Bombay Rock was then renowned for both the range of important Australian bands that performed there, and the regular violent fights among its patrons, with hardly a night going by without a fight. Australian photographer Rennie Ellis captured a number of performers at the venue in the 1980s, including Jo Jo Zep & The Falcons, Other bands to play there included INXS, Australian Crawl, The Angels, Cold Chisel, XTC, The Sunnyboys, Flowers, JAB, The Church, Kevin Borich, The Sports, Lonely Hearts, Sherbet, The Zorros, Dave Warner's From the Suburbs and Skyhooks. Once established, Bombay rock also hosted a number of international acts including Eric Burdon, Steppenwolf, The Knack, Bo Diddley, Boomtown Rats, and New Zealand band, Mi Sex.

The album Stars: Live At Bombay Rock was recorded at Bombay Rock on 18 October 1979. Nick Cave performed several times in the late 1970s with his band The Boys Next Door.

Dave Warner's band From the Suburbs recorded the album Free Kicks at Bombay Rock in November 1978.

The Bombay Rock features in the film Death in Brunswick, representing itself as a dangerous and sleazy music venue. Ray Argall's film The Models includes footage of the Bombay Rock.

The track Beautiful People (1979) by Australian Crawl includes a reference to the Bombay Rock night club in Brunswick.

It was frequented by some famous gangland identities including Judy Moran and Alphonse Gangitano.

Following reconstruction after the fire, the building retained its 19th-century facade, and became the site of the Beach Nightclub, eventually closing.

In May 2018, EMS the venue reopened under the management of Asher Trainor and Kacey Knoodle. Trading back under the Bombay Rock name
