= 2010 Melbourne live music rally =

Protest event in Melbourne, Australia

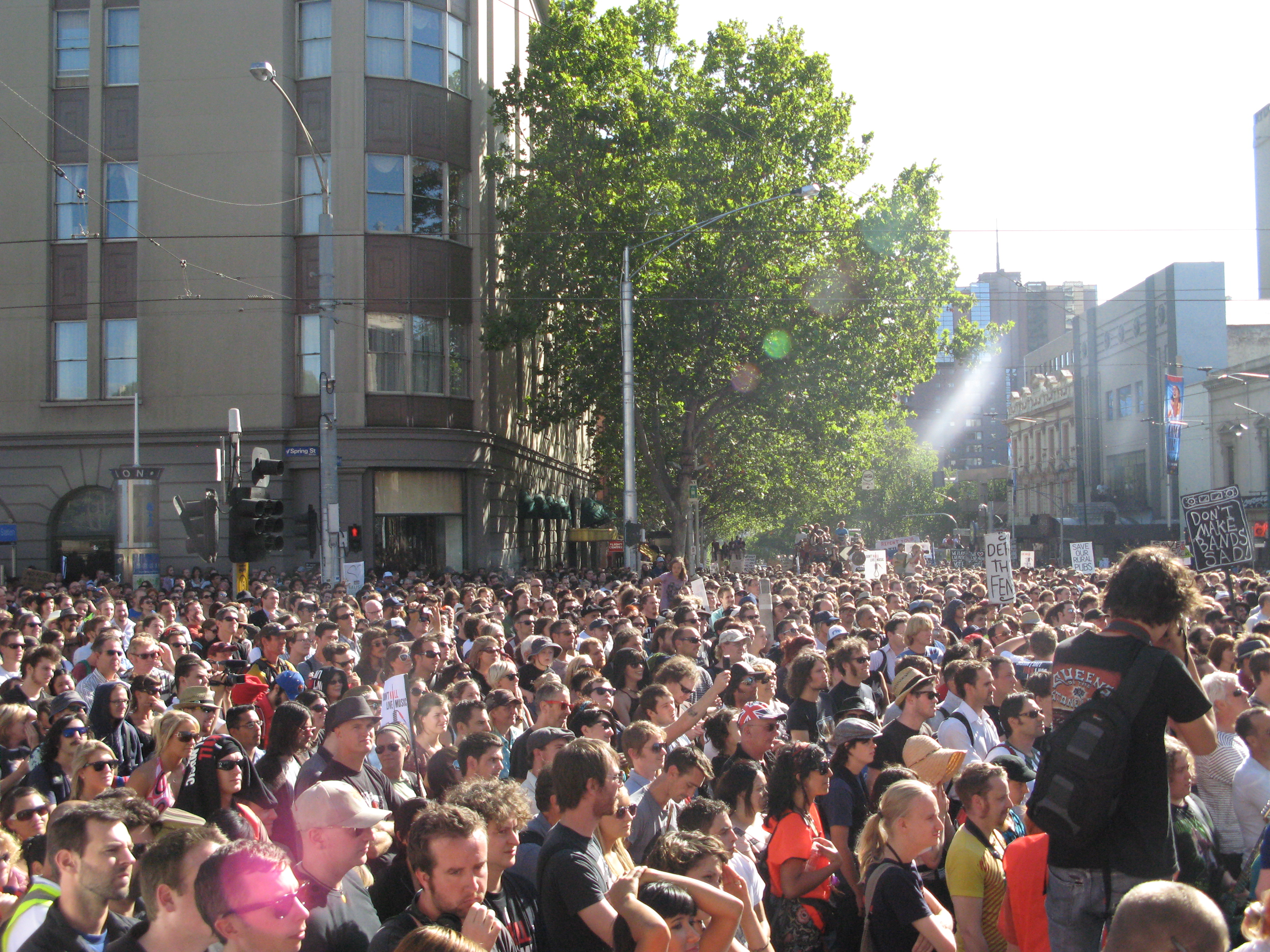
Southern corner of Bourke and Spring Streets during the rally

The 2010 Melbourne live music rally, (commonly known as the Save Live Australia's Music (SLAM) rally) was a public rally held on 23 February 2010, in the Melbourne central business district, Australia. The rally was an act of protest against effects of liquor licensing laws on live music venues in the city. Attendance was estimated at 10,000 to 20,000 by the Australian Broadcasting Corporation.

== Background ==
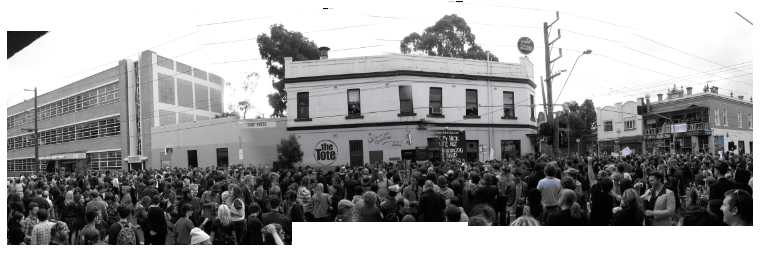
The rally at the Tote, 17 January 2010

The Tote Hotel, located in the inner-city Melbourne suburb of Collingwood, closed in January 2010, due to the owners' inability to continue payments related to the Victorian Civil and Administrative Tribunal (VCAT)'s regulations that deemed live music venues that opened beyond 1am "high risk". Since the owners, brothers Bruce and James Milne—officially the "licence nominees" of the premises—purchased the establishment in 2001, the most profitable segment of its opening hours has been between 1am and 3am. The Tote was classified alongside mainstream nightclubs on King Street located in the city's central business district (CBD), receiving the label a "high-risk" venue.

The classification "high-risk" was determined by new conditions that were reported by ABC Radio Melbourne on 20 January 2014. According to the new regulatory framework, all venues playing live or amplified music after 1pm were classified as "high-risk" and must employ two security guards from two hours prior to a live performance until two hours after its completion. The new laws were designed to curb so-called "alcohol fuelled violence" in Melbourne's CBD area.

In a January 2010 interview with The Age newspaper, Bruce Milne stated, 27 years after the building was first erected, "I have simply run out of money. Every effort I have made, which have been reasonable, sensible compromises, have fallen on deaf ears." VCAT's ongoing receipt of the venue's liquor licence fees led to the maintenance cost of the Tote increasing by 500 per cent and Milne explained, "We don't have a long-term lease and the fees have come to a head in the last few days. I just can't afford to keep fighting." Regulations that were initially aimed at curbing alcohol-fuelled violence were impeding upon the Tote's ability to survive even though Bruce Milne stated that he had not witnessed violence at the venue in nine years. Additionally, a local police sergeant said to the media in 2010 that the Tote was "not one of our trouble spots in the area."

A social networking group was created in opposition to the closure of the venue and on the evening of 14 January 2010, a rally was organised to protest at the venue. On 17 January 2010, a crowd of between 2,000 and 5,000 rallied outside the venue. At the time of the protest outside of the Tote, Christopher Morris, a majority shareholder in the group that owns the building that housed the Tote, explained in regard to the legislative attempt to prevent violence: "Sometimes the cost of security would be more than they'd actually take over the bar."

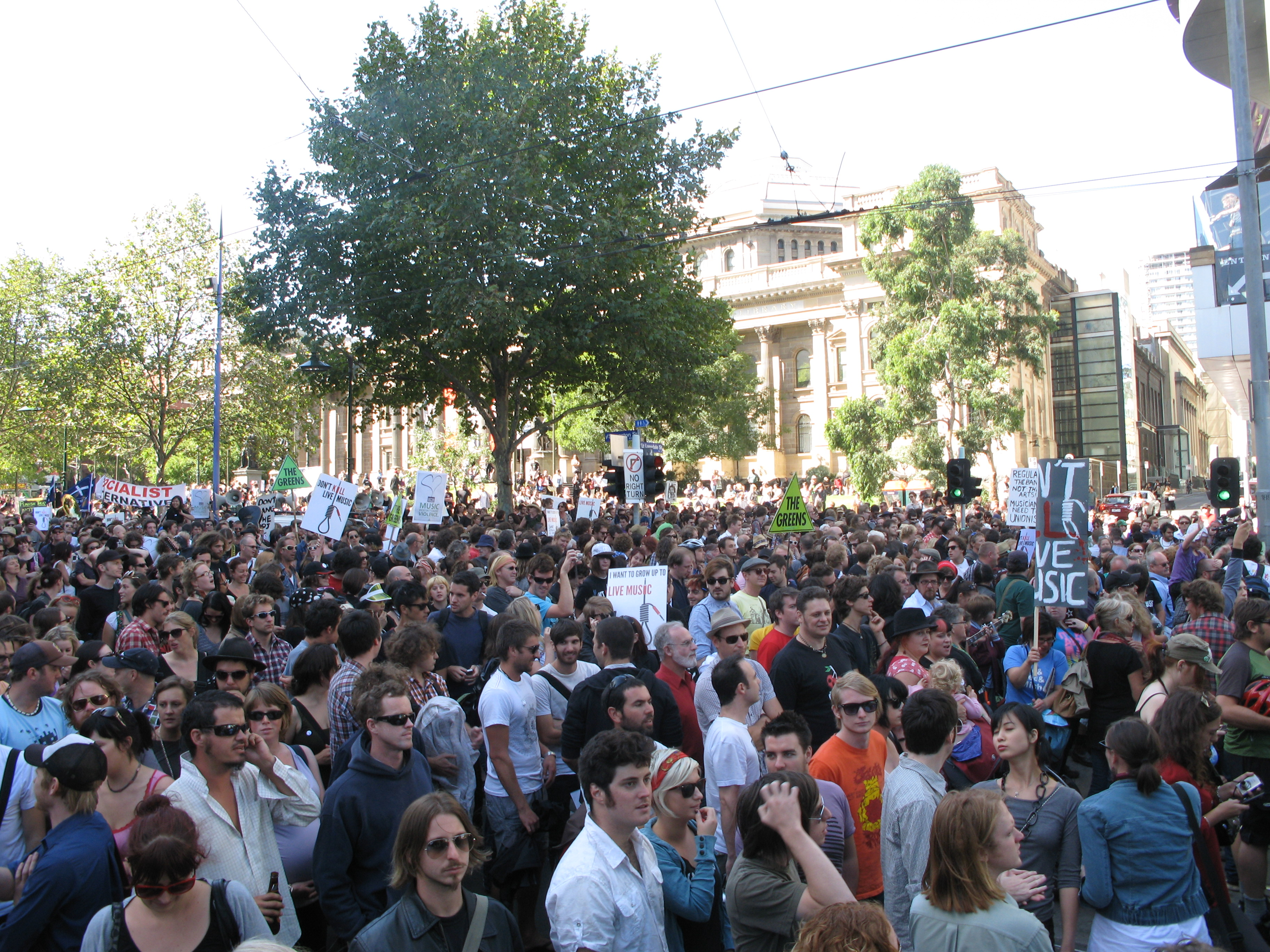
Crowd gathering at the State Library Victoria, Swanston Street

== Rally ==
Following the Tote rally, concern over the status of live music in the city of Melbourne led to the formation of three separate organisations: SLAM (Save Live Australia's Music), a group that commenced organising a larger rally in late January-early February 2010; Fair Go 4 Live Music (FG4LM), "an informal collection of people" whose aim is "to protect and support Victoria's live contemporary music scene"; and Music Victoria, Victoria's first contemporary music industry peak body— funded by the Victorian State Government—that was founded in early 2010.

Representing SLAM, rally co-organiser, and former Blue Ruin singer, Quincy McLean, contacted police and the Melbourne City Council on 1 February 2010 to securing a permit for a larger protest to publicise the issue that was affecting venues like the Tote, the Lomond Hotel and the Railway Hotel in North Fitzroy. McLean explained to the Age newspaper:

This is going to happen whether they like it or not. It's got too much momentum, it's too big to stop now. It will be like Moomba with a message. Whenever a natural disaster happens, musicians are the first to put their hand up and offer support. Now it's time for the public, who get music free online and hear it for free on the radio wherever they go, to give support back to the music they love so much. The record industry is already falling apart, from illegal downloads. So the only way musicians can make money is through live music, and now that rug is being pulled out from underneath them. It's like when the government put in the 2am Lockout [for venues]. It had failed in the UK, and then failed here again.

With the involvement of the second co-organiser Helen Marcou, a planning meeting was then held on 2 February at the Bakehouse Studios complex in the inner-eastern Melbourne suburb of Richmond. The organisation of the rally was undertaken exclusively by volunteers without the assistance of government funding. Prior to the rally, which was scheduled for 23 February 2010, SLAM, FG4LM and Music Victoria all signed the Live Music Accord document.

The SLAM rally began at 4pm at the Victorian State Library, where a large crowd began to grow from around 3pm. The rally's first movement was south down Swanston Street, followed by a left turn up Bourke Street. The crowd eventually arrived at the state's Parliament House building on Spring Street, where a variety of speakers and musical performances occurred. Throughout the route, members of the RocKwiz orchestra enacted AC/DC's song "Long Way to the Top (If You Wanna Rock n' Roll)" music video, a tribute to the 34th anniversary of the video that was filmed along Swanston Street.

McLean said to ABC radio at the rally: "I'm certainly happy with the talk the government's talking, it's a matter of getting it enacted now."

Many individuals, groups and bands were in attendance at the rally, including; Paul Kelly, Missy Higgins, Paul Dempsey (Something For Kate), Tim Rogers (You Am I), Wilbur Wilde, Kram (Spiderbait), Scott Owen (The Living End), Clare Bowditch, Cut Copy, Evelyn Morris, My Disco and Amanda Palmer.

=== Speakers ===
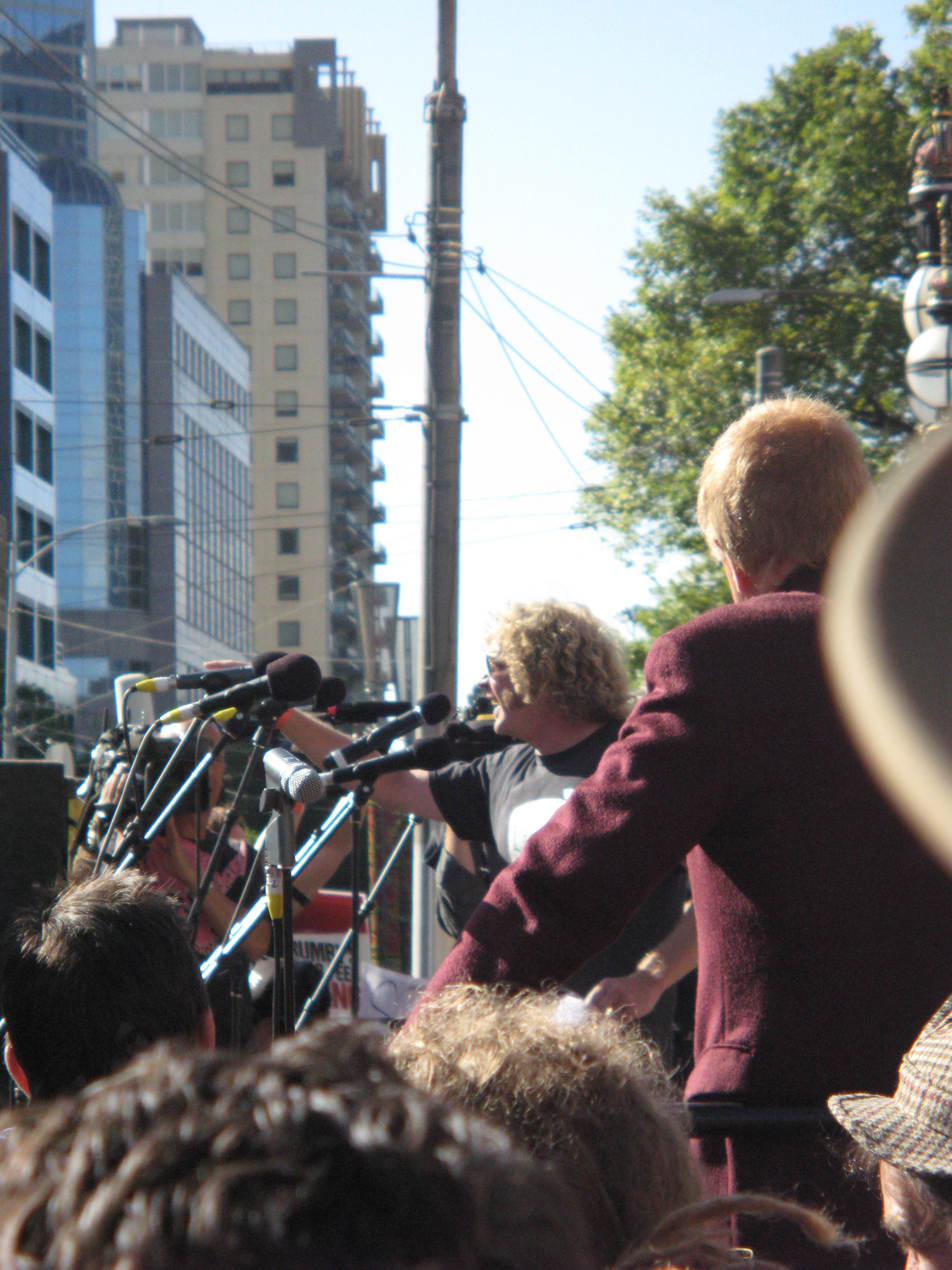
Jon Von Goes on stage at the steps of Parliament House, Spring Street

- Brian Nankervis (MC)
- Paul Kelly
- Rick Dempster
- Irine Vela
- Tim Rogers
- Clare Bowditch
- Mick Harvey
- Ian "Molly" Meldrum
- Jim White
- Amanda Palmer
- Jon Von Goes
- Ian Bland
- John Perring
- Pikelet (Evelyn Morris)
- Missy Higgins
- Quincy Mclean

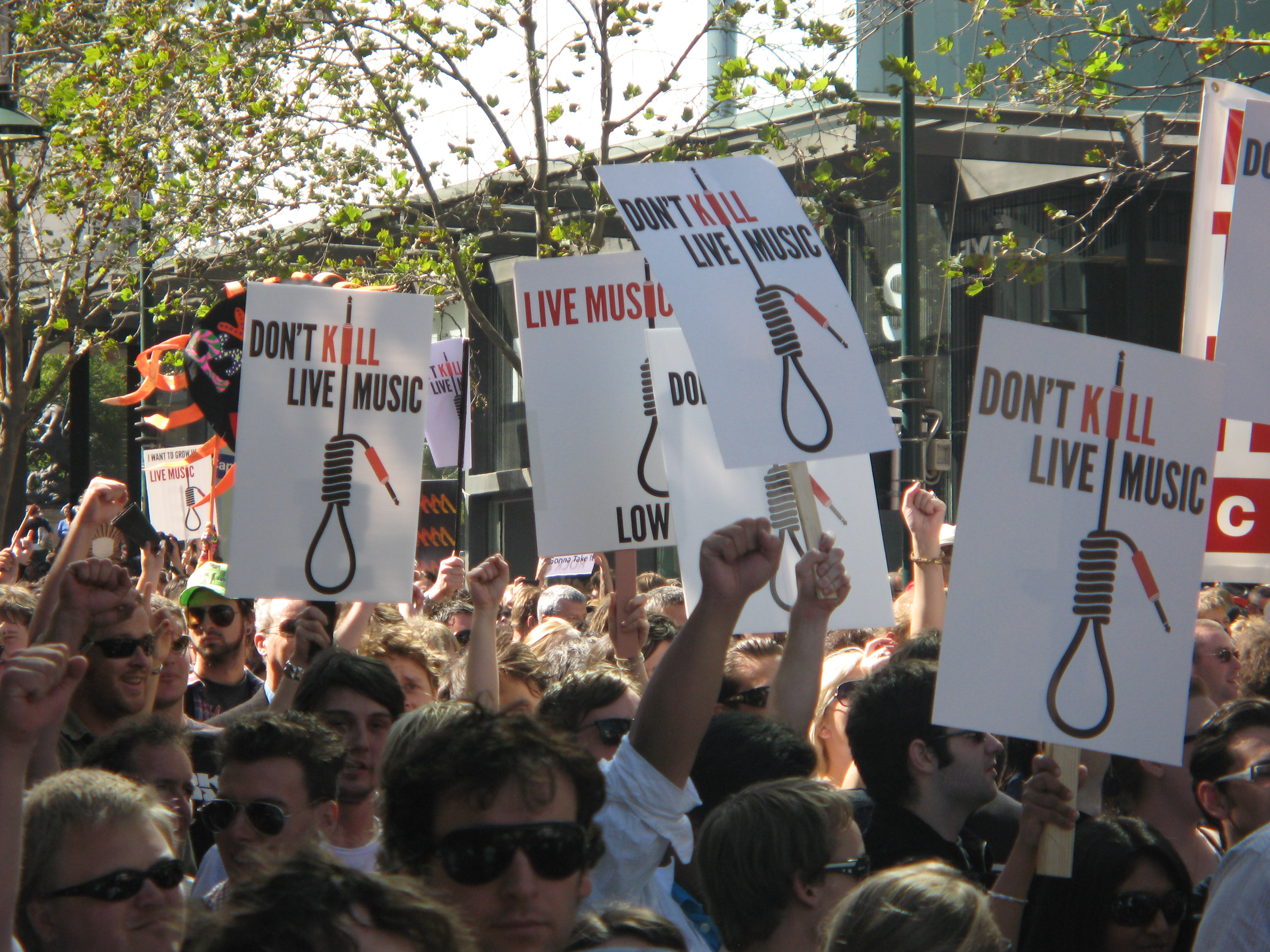
SLAM posters, heading south down Swanston Street

=== Quotes ===
Notable statements were made by artists as part of the SLAM rally event. The Melbourne band My Disco released an official statement prior to the rally:

Looking at the live music culture outside Victoria, we count ourselves lucky to live and be actively involved in the Melbourne music scene. Venue closures throughout Sydney and Brisbane have forced live music to struggle in inner city suburban homes, warehouses, art spaces and anywhere that will host it in a desperate effort to save a once flourishing community. As venue owners in our city now face increased licensing fees, cut backs on hours of operation and strict decibel restriction, we are forced to realize that without active community participation, Melbourne could soon become a mere shadow of what was once heralded as the greatest live music community in the southern hemisphere.

Dempster, harmonica player for the Brunswick Blues Shooters, stated during the rally, while alongside Kelly:

As far as I’m concerned, the small venue is a centre of community cohesion, people know each other, and they’re drawn together. nobody goes there looking for trouble, we all know that. If there’s a few blow-ins and they’ve strayed into the wrong place and they’re trying to start something, they may as well try to start something in a local church. It’s like trying to strike a match against a damp cloth: no chance of fire.

The government’s worried about community violence, so are we all. Music and small venues are something that enriches local identity, social responsibility and cohesion. For many of us, it’s the nearest thing to real living culture that we can experience. And we in the inner suburbs are lucky to have our small pubs and bars and restaurants. I understand the social function and humanitarian value of live music, that’s part of a way of life, as much as food, drink, conversation and laughter are.

Shortly after my gig folded due to the financial impracticality of employing two crown controllers insisted by the liquor licensing directorate, the same body approved two clubs in the Docklands area. One with a capacity of 750 people, the other with a capacity of 1500. It’s unlikely that either of these places will employ live musicians, it’s equally unlikely that any of the patrons that frequent these places will create social networks through attending these venues. These places are anonymous. The staff will not become familiar with any one of the sea of faces that pass through. And these faces drawn from places that know no community. From places with no other life than the shopping mall—certainly no local gigs—to get as drunk as they can, be ejected by security to continue their binge, free of identification, other than by the cold eye of the security camera on the street or the train station, where they can vent their frustration, their alienation, and their bored anger on some passing individual; as faceless to them as they have become to themselves. As for me, I’ll see you at the local gig, if it’s still there.

== Impact ==
After the completion of the highly publicised SLAM rally, FG4LM proceeded to collect signatures throughout Victoria for a petition "calling on the State Government to overturn the link between live music and 'high risk' conditions on liquor licences for live music venues". The petition was eventually delivered to the Legislative Council at Parliament House on 7 April 2010 by musicians who were from the different decades within the time period from the 1930s to the 1980s.

Additionally, SLAM, FG4LM and Music Victoria engaged in a seven-month process to negotiate the formalisation of the Live Music Agreement that acknowledged that live music does not cause violence. However, the concluding paragraph of the petition delivered by FG4LM on 7 April stated:

Despite the signing of the Live Music Accord with the State Government, the link between live music and 'high risk' still exists. More disturbingly, no venues have had their high risk conditions removed since the signing of the Accord. The music industry and the public want to see real action on this issue. We want action, not just Accords. The threat to Victoria’s vibrant live music culture remains in place. The 22000 signatures attest to the public support of live music. SLAM, FG4LM and Music Victoria will redouble their efforts to bring this issue to the attention of the public.

The Tote Hotel was reopened in June 2010 after new owners, John Perring, Andy Portokallis and Sam Crupi, resumed the venue's day-to-day business with the same team of employees. Tote band booker Amanda Palmer said in January 2011: "The Tote closure was a catalyst that kicked people out of their complacency and has led to some wonderful changes to contemporary music in Victoria with a lot more, hopefully, a lot more to come."

Also in June 2010, the new director of Liquor Licensing, Mark Brennan, was quoted in The Age saying that live music is not dangerous and that blanket security licence conditions would not be imposed upon live venues.

=== Arts Victoria 2011 report ===
The completion of an Arts Victoria report, published in June 2011 and undertaken by Deloitte Access Economics, occurred due to the Victorian Government's interest in "generating new and improved forms of evidence in relation to the significance of the contribution of the Victorian venue-based live music sector." The report, launched at the Tote Hotel on 9 August 2011 by Victorian Premier Ted Baillieu, found that:

- Melbourne has more live music venues than any other Australian city.
- Around 600 venues throughout Victoria collectively provide an average of 3,000 live performances on a weekly basis.
- "Victorian live music performers provide an average of 23.5 performances in Victorian venues per year, or an average of two per month."
- "Victorian performers earn an average of [A]$19,500 per year from live music performance, with 69% of this amount – or [A]$13,455 – derived from venue-based performance."
- Victorians attend an average of two performances in the state's venues each month.

In financial terms, the report estimated that live music in venues generated an additional A$501 million in gross state product (GSP) to the Victorian economy in 2009/10. The report's conclusion reads:

Live music makes an important economic, social and cultural contribution to Victoria. Furthermore, as with any industry, the conditions affecting the ongoing commercial viability of live music are subject to a range of influences, particularly in relation to regulatory and policy developments. Careful consideration should be given to any government interventions that might directly or indirectly restrict or indeed promote the provision of live music.

The Live Music Agreement was followed by a new law, introduced in December 2011, resulting in the inclusion of live music in the "Objects" section of the Liquor Licensing Act.

== See also ==
- Music of Melbourne
- The Tote Hotel
