= The Old Bar =

Bar and music venue in Melbourne, Australia

Coordinates: 37°47′54.0″S 144°58′37.6″E

- The Oldie
- Interactive map of The Old Bar
- Former names: Carmen Bar Restaurant
- Location: Fitzroy, Melbourne, Victoria, Australia
- Capacity: 175
- Type: Music venue
- Events: Independent music Punk; Alternative; Hardcore; Experimental

Construction
- Built: ca. 1903 (present structure)
- Opened: 2001 (as The Old Bar)

Website
- http://www.theoldbar.com.au/

The Old Bar is a bar and live music venue located at 74–76 Johnston Street in Fitzroy, an inner-city suburb of Melbourne, Victoria, Australia. It has operated under its current name since 2001 and occupies buildings constructed in the early 20th century. The venue is primarily used for live music performances, particularly by independent artists, and has a capacity of approximately 175 people.

== History ==
The buildings on the site were constructed around the turn of the 20th century, appearing in postal records from 1903/04. Original uses for the buildings varied over the years from various manufacturing enterprises, a dairy, haberdashery and clothing stores, as well as cafes and restaurants. In 2001, the venue opened as The Old Bar, under the management of Andy Tannahill, until ownership passed to Paul Jakovcic in 2005. In 2007, the venue was taken over by the operators of The Afterdark, formerly a bar and live music venue in High Street, Northcote.

== Music ==
The current management consolidated and developed the bar as a music venue showcasing local and international bands and artists in the musical genres rock, country, folk, experimental, punk, post-punk, heavy metal and hardcore, amongst others.

The venue continues to host many independent local, Australian and international acts, including Blag Dahlia (The Dwarves), Charlie Parr, Okkerville River, Cash Savage and the Last Drinks, Graveyard Train, C.W. Stoneking, Six Ft Hick, The Nation Blue, The Meanies, Children Collide, Delaney Davidson, Mikelangelo & The Tin Star, Spod, Little John, Eddy Current Suppression Ring, Kim Salmon, and Dave Graney.

== Community involvement ==
The Old Bar has also hosted fundraising events for wider causes, including flood relief event Banana-peel and a month-long string of benefit shows, including live broadcasts of radio show 'Burning Vinyl' for local Community Radio station 3CR.

== Legal issues ==
The Old Bar, along with many inner city Melbourne music venues, faced noise and licensing restrictions imposed by local and state authorities in the past few years. Noise complaints from local residents, especially in new housing developments in the immediate vicinity forced the current owners to renovate in order to reduce ambient noise escaping from the venue. Following the Tote closure in 2010, then co-manager Liam Matthews voiced an opinion, along with other venue operators, that local and state restrictions on licensed live music venues made it difficult for continued operation of such venues in the City of Yarra, at a public meeting. He indicated a strong and unfair emphasis on existing business owners to comply to new development in the City.

== Old Bar Unicorns ==
The Old Bar Unicorns take the field in the annual Renegade Pub Football League, a grassroots, inclusive and mixed-gendered Australian rules football competition played between teams put forward by several inner city Melbourne music venues. Other participants include the Tote Hotel, the Labor in Vain Hotel, Some Velvet Morning, The Workers Club, Bar Open and Lomond Barracudas. RPFL games can attract over 500 spectators, with DJs playing from the stands and food and beers available for purchase. While there are no finals or premiership, competition is described as fierce but friendly. The league has moved homes several times since it began. In 2015 the league moved to its new home at Victoria Park, Abbottsford.

== Awards and nominations ==
=== National Live Music Awards ===
The National Live Music Awards (NLMAs) are a broad recognition of Australia's diverse live industry, celebrating the success of the Australian live scene. The awards commenced in 2016.

Year	Nominee / work	Award	Result
2017	The Old Bar	Victorian Live Venue of the Year	Won

=== Music Victoria Awards ===
The Music Victoria Awards are an annual awards night celebrating Victorian music. They commenced in 2006. The award for Best Venue was introduced in 2016.

Year	Nominee / work	Award	Result	Ref.
Music Victoria Awards of 2016	The Old Bar	Best Venue (Under 500 Capacity)	Nominated	
Music Victoria Awards of 2017	The Old Bar	Best Venue (Under 500 Capacity)	Nominated	
Music Victoria Awards of 2018	The Old Bar	Best Venue (Under 500 Capacity)	Nominated	
Music Victoria Awards of 2019	The Old Bar	Best Venue (Under 500 Capacity)	Nominated	
Music Victoria Awards of 2020	The Old Bar	Best Venue (Under 500 Capacity)	Nominated	

== See also ==
- Music of Melbourne
- Fitzroy, Victoria
