= Cash Savage and the Last Drinks =

Australian band from Melbourne

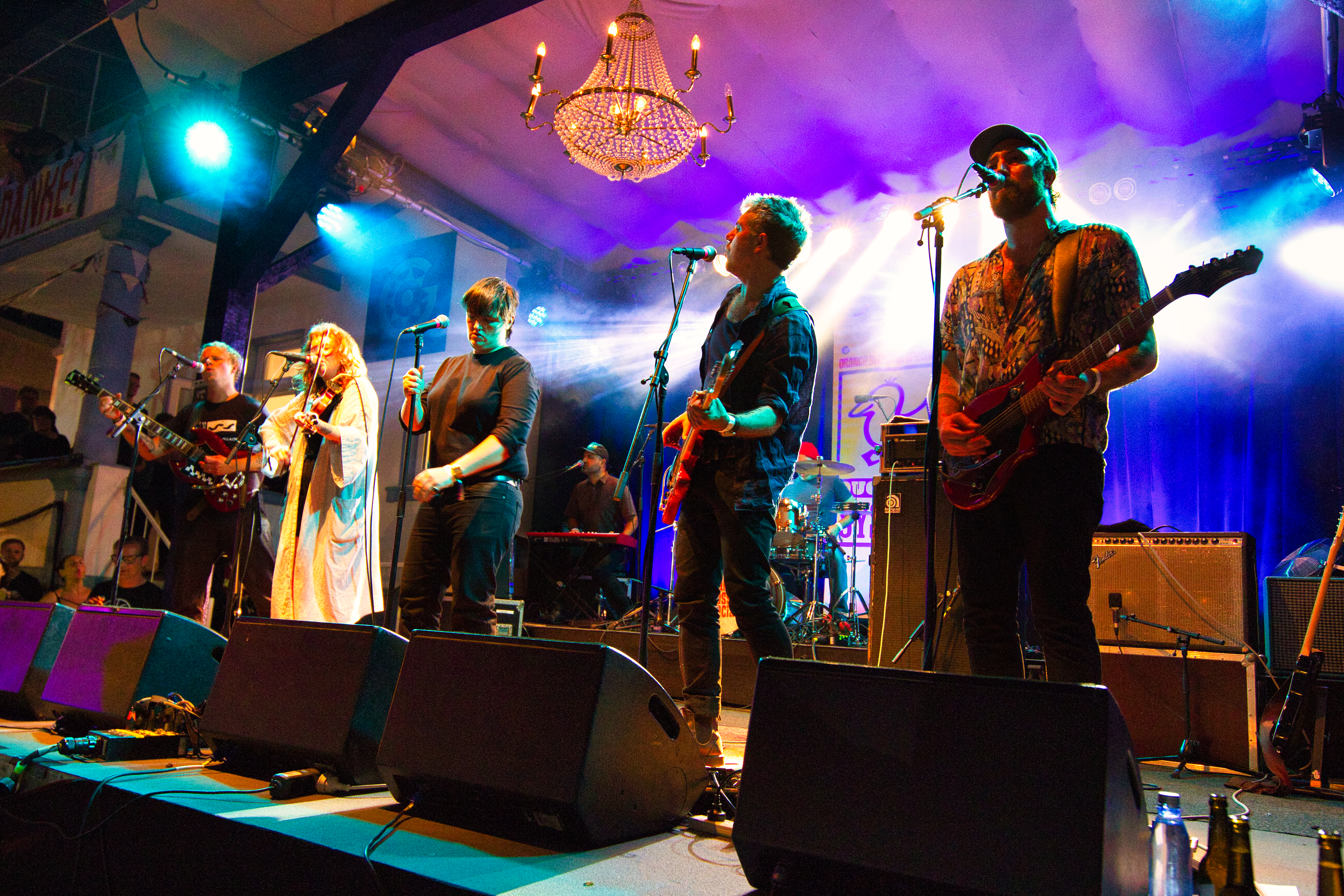
- At Orange Blossom Special Festival, Beverungen in 2022

Background information
- Origin: Melbourne, Australia
- Genres: Alternative rock; post-punk; folk blues
- Years active: 2008–present
- Labels: Mistletone; Glitterhouse
- Members: Cash Savage; Nick Finch; Rene Mancuso; Dougal Shaw; Roshan Khozouei; Kat Mear; Joe White; Anna Langdon; Ed Fraser
- Website: cashsavage.com.au

Cash Savage and the Last Drinks is an Australian band from Melbourne, formed in 2008 by singer and guitarist Cash Savage. Currently, the lineup also includes guitarists Joe White and Dougal Shaw, fiddlist Kat Mear, percussionist Rene Mancuso, keyboardist Roshan Khozouei and bassist Nick Finch. They have released five studio albums and one live album: Wolf (2010), The Hypnotiser (2013), One of Us (2016), Good Citizens (2018), Live at Hamer Hall (2020) and So This is Love (2023).

== History ==
=== 2008–2014: Formation and Wolf and The Hypnotiser ===
Singer and songwriter Cash Savage grew up in Port Albert, in the Gippsland region of Victoria, and is the eldest of five children. Born into a musical family, Savage's uncle was Conway Savage, a veteran Australian rock musician and keyboardist for Nick Cave and the Bad Seeds. Savage began playing gigs around Melbourne at age 17.

In 2008, Savage formed the Last Drinks as her backing band, with no fixed line-up, but instead including whoever was available to play on any given night. A self-released, self-titled EP was released in 2008. Savage credits Fitzroy venue The Old Bar as the band's spiritual home. In 2010, the band released Wolf.

The band's line-up was solidified in 2013, and they recorded The Hypnotiser at Head Gap Studios in Preston, Victoria, produced by Nick Finch (Graveyard Train) and engineered by Nao Anzai. The album was featured in year-end critic lists by Triple R, PBS 106.7FM, and Beat Magazine. "I’m in Love" was nominated for Best Song at the Music Victoria Awards of 2013.

=== 2015–present: One of Us and Good Citizens ===
In 2015, the band was signed to independent Australian label Mistletone Records to release its third studio album, One of Us (2016). The album's lyrical content reflects a tumultuous personal period for Savage. Upon its release, One of Us received very favourable critical reviews from publications such as the Sydney Morning Herald, the Herald Sun, and Beat Magazine, and was named Album of the Week by Triple R. The album's success saw the band tour Europe in 2015 and 2016, playing shows and festivals in Czech Republic, France, Poland, Netherlands and Austria.

Following their first international tour, the band received distribution for their 2nd and 3rd albums across Europe by Beast Records.

=== 2020–present: Live at Hamer Hall and So This is Love ===
In 2020, in between lockdowns, Cash Savage &The Last Drinks were asked to perform at Melbourne’s iconic Hamer Hall to cameras and no audience. The show was so powerful that it was pressed as a live album by Glitterhouse Records in Germany, and Mistletone in Australia.

Reflecting on the Hamer Hall performance, Cash stated; “There were mixed emotions going into this performance. Melbourne had fared well through the first lockdown, and as we were rehearsing for this, it felt like we were going to come out of it okay. By the time we performed, it was the very beginnings of the second wave. “Having the opportunity to play Hamer Hall was huge. It was an adjustment of expectations to think of it as a gig with no audience. We decided to make this something different — not a gig with no audience — its own thing. A performance in one movement. No gaps, no empty space. No back and forth with the crowd. Just us. We didn’t intend on releasing it when we recorded it. It was performed for the moment.”

On the 28 April 2023, Cash Savage and the Last Drinks released their fifth studio album So This is Love through Mistletone in Australia and Glitterhouse in Germany. Rough trade said about the album - 'The theme of fragility runs through the album like a faultline. Fragile mental health, a fragile economy, the fragility of the environment and our personal relationships, all on the brink of collapse, threatening to crack under pressure; this is the fraught territory So This Is Love inhabits, and fearlessly explores. The opening three songs of the album flow into each other with increasing urgency, declaring the gravity of the situation. True to the album title, Cash Savage delves deep and with ferocious honesty into what love means to her, as a queer woman coming to terms with a marriage breakup and a mental breakdown. “All love will end, all love will change form”, Cash observes. “If you experience deep love, you don’t judge it as a failure if it doesn’t last. You can love someone after they die, you can love someone in a different way.” Romantic love, family love, the bonds of friendship, self-love and the affectionate intimacy of spending the night with someone are some of the forms that love takes, as the stories of So This Is Love unfold'.

== Discography ==
=== Studio albums ===
Title	Album details
Wolf	Released: 19 November 2010; Label AUST: Cash Savage (CSLD001); Label FR: Beast Records (BR211); Format: CD, DD
The Hypnotiser	Released: 2 August 2013; Label: Cash Savage (CSLD02); Format: CD, DD, LP
One of Us	Released: 29 December 2017; Label AUST: Mistletone Records (MIST077); Label FR: Beast Records (BR212); Format: CD, DD, LP, streaming
Good Citizens	Released: 21 September 2018; Label: Mistletone Records (MIST088); Format: CD, DD, LP, streaming
So This is Love	Released: 28 April 2023; Label AUST: Mistletone Records (MIST101); Label: EU & UK Glitterhouse Records (GR 1100); Format: CD, DD, LP, Streaming

=== Live albums ===
Title	Album details
Live at Hamer Hall	Released: 27 November 2020; Label: Mistletone (MIST093); Format: LP, Streaming

=== Extended plays ===
Title	Album details
Cash Savage and the Last Drinks	Released: 2008; Label: Cash Savage and the Last Drinks; Format: CD, DD

== Awards and nominations ==
=== ARIA Music Awards ===
The ARIA Music Awards is an annual awards ceremony held by the Australian Recording Industry Association.

Year	Nominee / work	Award	Result	Ref.
2023	So This Is Love	Best Blues and Roots Album	Nominated	

=== Music Victoria Awards ===
The Music Victoria Awards (previously known as The Age EG Awards and The Age Music Victoria Awards) are an annual awards night celebrating Victorian music.

Year	Nominee / work	Award	Result	Ref.
2013	"I'm in Love"	Best Song	Nominated	
2017	themselves	Best Live Act	Nominated	
2019	themselves	Best Band	Nominated	
2019	"Good Citizens"	Best Song	Nominated	
2023	So This is Love	Best Album	Won	
2023	themselves	Best Rock/Punk Work	Nominated	

=== National Live Music Awards ===
The National Live Music Awards (NLMAs) commenced in 2016 to recognise contributions to the live music industry in Australia.

Year	Nominee / work	Award	Result	Ref.
2017	Cash Savage and the Last Drinks	Live Blues and Roots Act of the Year	Nominated	
2018	Cash Savage and the Last Drinks	Live Blues and Roots Act of the Year	Nominated	
2018	Kat Mear (Cash Savage and the Last Drinks)	Live Instrumentalist Act of the Year	Nominated	
2019	Cash Savage and the Last Drinks	Live Indie / Rock Act of the Year	Nominated	
2019	Kat Mear (Cash Savage and the Last Drinks)	Live Instrumentalist Act of the Year!	Nominated	
2023	Cash Savage	Best Live Voice	Nominated	
2023	Nick Finch (Cash Savage)	Best Live Bassist	Nominated	
2023	Cash Savage	Best Indie/Rock/Alternative Act	Nominated	
