= Red Bennies =

Performing arts venue in Melbourne, Australia

Red Bennies was an Australian performing arts and live music neo-cabaret cocktail bar, situated on Melbourne's south side entertainment strip of Chapel St, South Yarra. It was founded by hospitality entrepreneur Garrath Holt, promoter and film maker Christopher H.F. Mitchell. and Artistic Director and Arts Marketer, Alexander Schoeffel joining shortly after.

The venue opened January 2010, playing host to over a thousand shows and winning numerous arts awards during its 4 years of operation prior to its closure in 2014.

The deco inspired late night cocktail bar, dinner venue and nightclub played host to a wide variety of stage shows, from aerial circus performances, burlesque, cabaret, theatre and comedy to international bands, djs, jazz, film festivals and BDSM.

Red Bennies has been credited to giving rise to the new wave of burlesque culture which permeated throughout Melbourne and Australia at the end of the 2000s. The only large scale venue producing stage shows 5 days a week, RB's fostered a home and employment for many of Australia's biggest names in burlesque which sparked the introduction of the Miss Burlesque Australia competition alongside burlesque schools hosted at the venue but its various creative partnerships.

Likewise RB's had a close working relationship with NICA (National Institute of Circus Arts) the premier circus training school in the Southern Hemisphere. The venue acted as a hub for student showcases and provided a large amount of employment for the national circus community. The venue also often featured guest performers from touring companies in town including Cirque De Soleil.

The venue was subject to media controversy on a number of occasions for its willingness to push the boundaries of entertainment and controversial performance commentary, including its critically celebrated season of NUDE.

Initially a hub for Melbourne's fringe artists, performers, musicians and carnies, Red Bennies quickly rose in popularity attracting a more mainstream crowd which while galvanising commercial success for the venue, the new found mass market appeal effected Red Bennies image as Melbourne's home for underground performing arts, detracting some of its earlier established more esoteric audience.

In late 2013 Holt and Mitchell sold the venue to a major Melbourne hospitality group to focus on producing large boutique underground events, their first venture a punk rock vampire strip club called "Titty Twister" named after and inspired by the bar from Robert Rodriguez and Quentin Tarantino's 1996 cult film From Dusk till Dawn.

With Holt, Mitchell or Schoeffel no longer at the helm, the new proprietors found difficulties in programming and marketing the venue to the standard established by the previous owners and closed Red Bennies early 2014 to replace the venue with a DJ focused Nightclub which maintained some elements of Red Bennies original shows.
