= Revolver Upstairs =

Nightclub and live music bar in melbourne

- Revs, River, Revolver
- Address: 229 Chapel Street, Prahran; Melbourne; Australia

Website
- https://revolverupstairs.com.au

Revolver Upstairs, known locally as 'Revs' or 'Revolver', is a live music bar and nightclub located on Chapel Street, Melbourne, Australia.

The venue regularly hosts performances from electronic music artists, especially the techno scene.

It is one of Australia's most famous nightclubs. The venue is in-part known for its 24-hour weekend license, and so is notorious as a common location for a 'weekend bender'; with 72-hour continuous benders being a feature of urban legend about the venue. Ordinarily, the music is interrupted during Saturday midday to operate as a Thai restaurant; after which it operates continuously until Monday morning.

Revs is a somewhat notorious venue in popular culture, in part due to rumours surrounding what occurs inside the club. Some of these rumours are disputed by the venue's managers as urban myths, and Vice has reported that the rumours are inaccurate.

== Description ==
local DJ playing on Revs' side-room stage

The interior of the venue has been described as 'eclectic', and is fitted with vintage furniture. It 'lacks conventional dance floor space'.

The interior features several original Banksy stencils, some still preserved behind Perspex or framed to protect them.

Crowd demographics have been discussed as an important issue by the venue managers in interviews. In a 2021 interview, they were quoted as saying: "In the early days, it was easier because a lot of interesting people were coming. But then once the hype about it being open on the weekend and all the stories started to emerge, it did attract a lot of dickheads. And keeping them out is a full-time job".

The venue regularly attracts artists and DJs to perform. Some of its more notable past performances include Fatboy Slim, Architecture in Helsinki, Bicep, Blackalicious, and The Avalanches.

During the week, and during Saturday afternoons, the venue is converted into a Thai restaurant called Colonel Tan's. The restaurant has received moderately favourable reviews from The Age.

== History and operations ==
The business 'Revolver' was created by Thai pop star Tan Punturaumporn and a Melbournite venue manager Camillo Ippoliti. Camilo had previously been a venue manager at Curtin House's Cookie, and The Toff In Town.

Initially the bottom floor was renovated from a former parachute factory, and became a business known as 'Revolver Music Gallery'. Later, an associate recommended that Camillo convert the upstairs level into a music venue, this became 'Revolver Upstairs'.

While the venue's staff claim that the venue is intended to be a community centre for music, arts, and culture; they have conceded in interviews that this doesn't match its public perception.

Revolver Upstairs is the longest running club night in Melbourne. Started in 1999, shortly after Revolver Upstairs secured a 7 am license, The Late Show has run every Saturday night since then (apart from brief pandemic closures).

== See also ==
- Music of Australia
- Rave culture
- William Street Bird
