= Solace Bar =

Solace

General information
- Location: 21-25 Croft Alley; Melbourne, Victoria, Australia
- Opened: 2025

Technical details
- Floor count: 3

Solace Bar is a bar and nightclub in Melbourne, Australia.

It is located in Melbourne's Chinatown district.

== History ==
It was opened in January 2025 by James Keogh, Chris Harris, Ollie Strong and Elliot Gooding. Ollie Strong and Chris Harris previously co-founded the event series 'Static Naarm' alongside some other friends; while James Keogh and Elliot Gooding co-founded the event series and label Circuit|Breaker whilst living in Sydney during the lockout-laws. All four eventually worked together alongside some others under the brand 'Static' prior to founding the Solace Nightclub.

The location of the bar was previously occupied by a business named 'the croft institute', which was a science-themed nightclub that operated between 2001 - 2020.

== Description ==
The nightclub contains three levels. On ground level is a bar, first floor contains couches, and the second floor contains a dance-floor equipped with a Funktion-One Evolution 2 sound system. Photography is banned on the dance-floor. The entire venue has a capacity for 250 people. It has a 3AM operating license.

The club's music selection has been described as leaning into local talent, with strong ties to the Berlin sound. Resident DJ's include the likes of TEEJAY (aka. Thomas Jhomas) and Bby Cass.
