= Section 8 (music venue) =

Music Bar in Australia

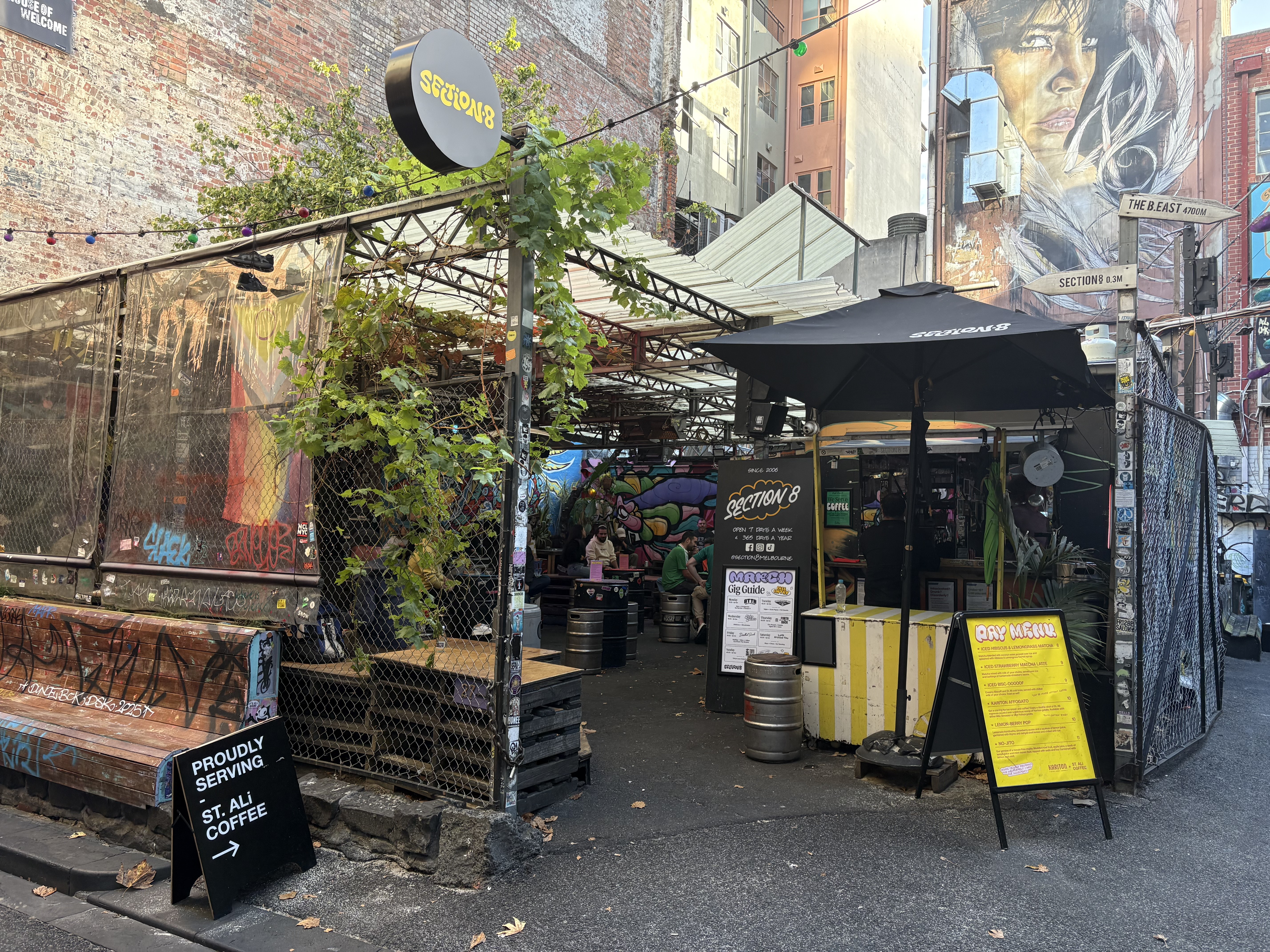
- Section 8 in March 2025
- Address: 27-29 Tattersalls Lane
- Location: Melbourne, Victoria, Australia

Construction
- Opened: 2006

Website
- https://section8.com.au/

Section 8 is a live music bar located in the Chinatown of Melbourne, Australia.

== Description ==
The venue plays host to local and international musicians. The venue is associated with hip-hop, house, and afrobeats. It has a relatively young crowd. It was Melbourne's first open-air bar.

Bar service is run out of a shipping container, with the courtyard of the venue located in an alleyway space behind a chain fence.

It neighbours another bar named Ferdydurke that is run by the same proprietor.

The venue requires that all patrons remove work attire, such as suits.

== History ==
Official logo

It opened in 2006 by Maz Salt.

The venue expanded to Sydney in 2013. As of 2023 it no longer appears to operate in that city.

== See also ==
- William Street Bird
- The Tote
