= Sticky Carpet =

2006 film

Sticky Carpet is Melbourne's alternative Rockumentary of 2006, a community driven documentary film by Mark Butcher, co-produced by Glenn Waterworth and Pip Stafford.

The film includes interviews with musicians Robin Fox, Rod Cooper, Ross Knight (Cosmic Psychos), Bruce Milne (founder of Au-Go-Go Records, In-Fidelity Records), Ron Rude (Melbourne Punk & DIY / Indie Recording Pioneer) and Rowland S. Howard (Boys Next Door, The Birthday Party). Live performance footage comes from Dirty Three, The Stabs, Baseball, Bored!, I Spit on your Gravy, The Sailors, Love of Diagrams, Pisschrist and others.

Bands include:

The Stabs, HTRK, My Disco, Colditz Glider, The Birthday Party, Baseball, Grey Daturas, Group Seizure, True Radical Miracle, Cockfight Shootout, Nation Blue, The Sinking Citizenship, Agents of Abhorrence, Civil Dissent, ABC Weapons, Pisschrist, The Dacios, The Sailors, Eddy Current Suppression Ring, Depression, Trash 'n' Chaos, Batrider, Ninetynine, The Assassination Collective, Digger and the Pussycats, The Losers, Bored!

The film has Australia and New Zealand DVD Distribution by Siren Visual Entertainment and had premiere screening at the Melbourne International Film Festival in 2006.

== Sources ==
- Sticky Carpet - Film Trailer on YouTube https://www.youtube.com/watch?v=SJpLUKheas0
