= Miscellania (nightclub) =

Australian nightclub

- Misc
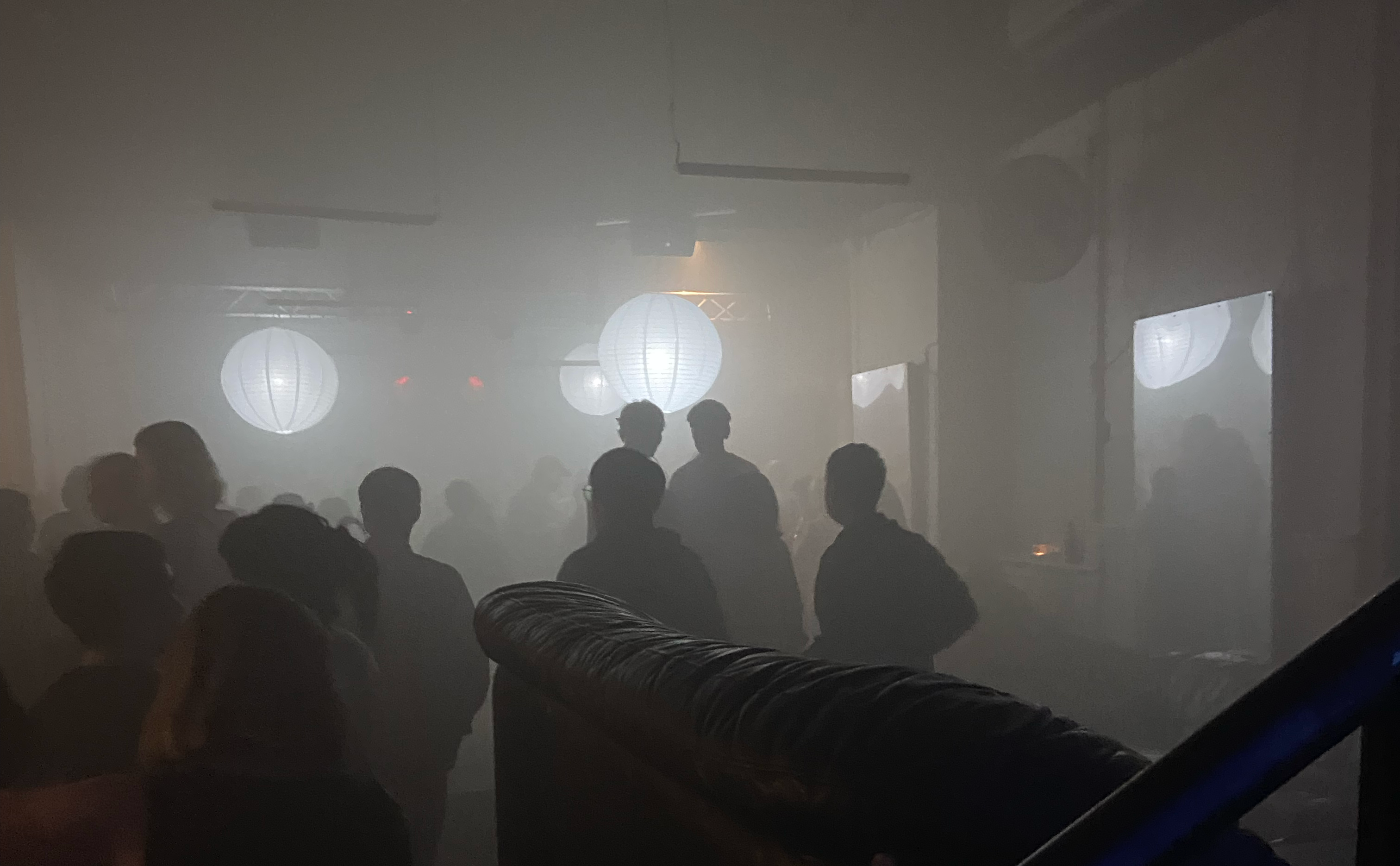
- Miscellania in October 2025
- Interactive map of Miscellania
- Address: 2/401 Swanston Street, Melbourne
- Location: Melbourne, Victoria, Australia

Construction
- Opened: 2021

Miscellania, known colloquially as Misc, is a nightclub in Melbourne, Australia. It is known for its varied programming, with experimental and alternative music, often featuring events that include dance performances or art installations. It is located on the north side of the CBD, on Swanston Street across from RMIT University.

== History ==
It was founded in 2021 by Georgia Vokes, Sasha Logan and Tim Fennell.

== Description ==
The interior of the venue has been described as resembling a 'New York style loft apartment'. The venue consists of a dance floor and rooftop bar. The music inside has been described as 'left-field', with quirky, experimental, hard-hitting and boundary-breaking music. The programming is known for its variety, including nights featuring Techno, choir performances, performance art, or noise shows

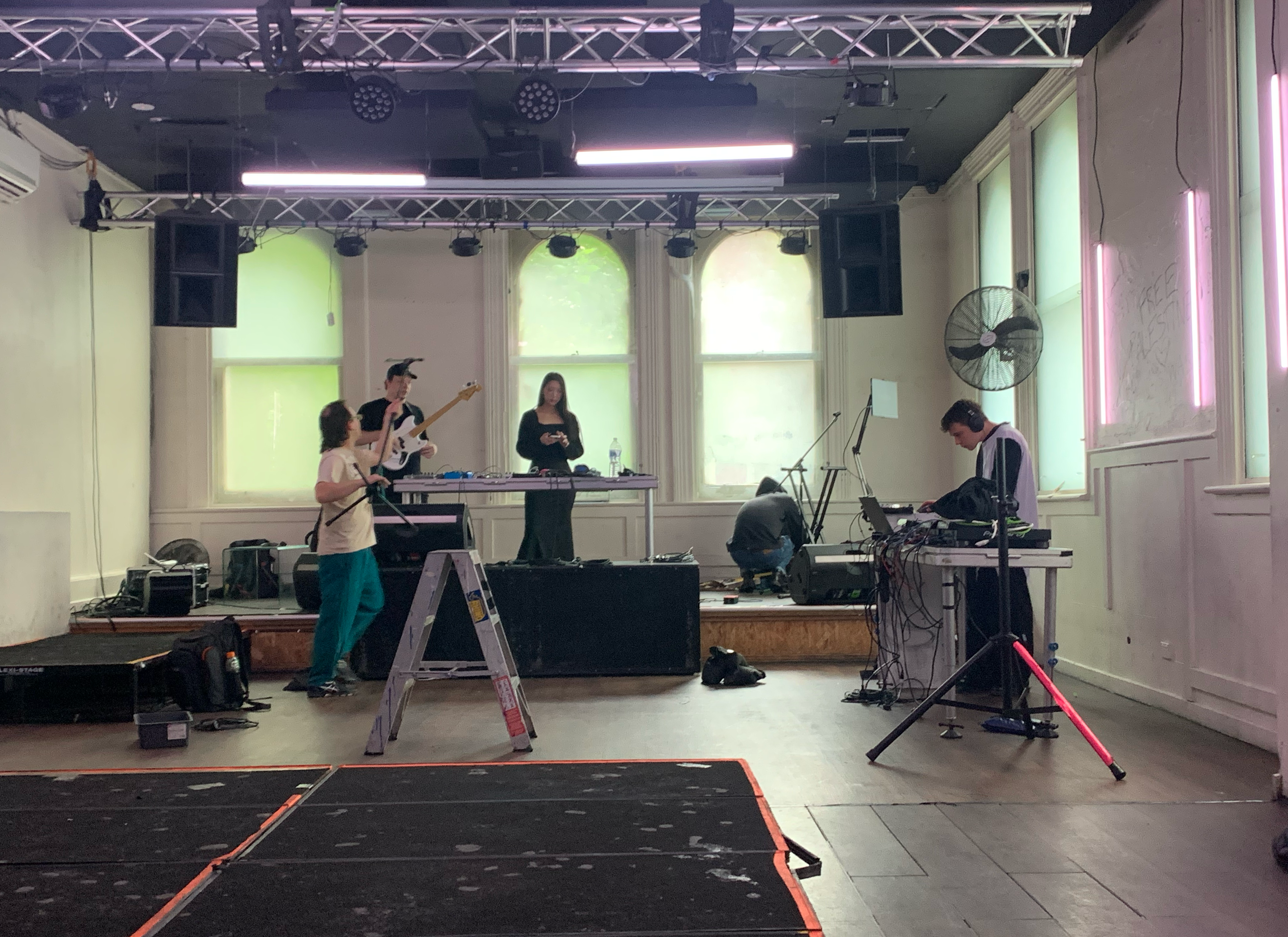
Musicians preparing at Miscellania before a performance

=== Misc Rooftop ===
Miscellania operates a separate standalone bar upstairs known as Misc Rooftop. It was originally the venue's smoking area, but was overhauled in 2025 into an independently operated, free-entry bar. It features non-dance DJ sets, kitchen pop ups, and other community-based events, like film screenings.

== Notable acts ==
The venue has hosted notable acts including: Skee Mask, Shackleton, and Yousuke Yukimatsu.
