= Camillo Ippoliti =

Australian impresario

Camillo Ippoliti is a publican, impresario, and restaurateur. His venues are in Melbourne, Australia.

He is known in part for his role in establishing prominent hospitality businesses in Melbourne. These include the nightclubs Cookie, Toff in Town, and Revolver Upstairs; as well as the restaurant Magic Mountain Saloon.

== Career ==
Prior to establishing venues of his own, Camillo worked as a barman.

One of the earliest venues established by Camillo was 'Subterrain', one of the first venues in Melbourne to host hip-hop nights; as well as the venue 'Inflation'.

In the 1990s, Camillo established Revolver Upstairs with a business partner Thai pop star Tan Punturaumporn. The purpose of Revolver Upstairs was to design a venue that would tap into street culture, arts communities, and subcultures.

In 2003 he opened the Thai restaurant Cookie in the Curtin House building, it operates one floor below The Toff in Town nightclub which opened in 2007.

In 2012 he took over the venue Pony, it was renamed to Boney the following year. In 2019 the venue was closed for unknown reasons.

In 2015 he opened Magic Mountain Saloon, a Thai restaurant with an interior designed by Australian architect Phillip Schemnitz.

== Recognition ==
In 2018 the venue 'Cookie' was entered into the ArchitectureAU design awards hall of fame.
