= The Tote Hotel =

Pub and music venue in Melbourne, Australia

Coordinates: 37.7994°S 144.9871°E

- The Tote
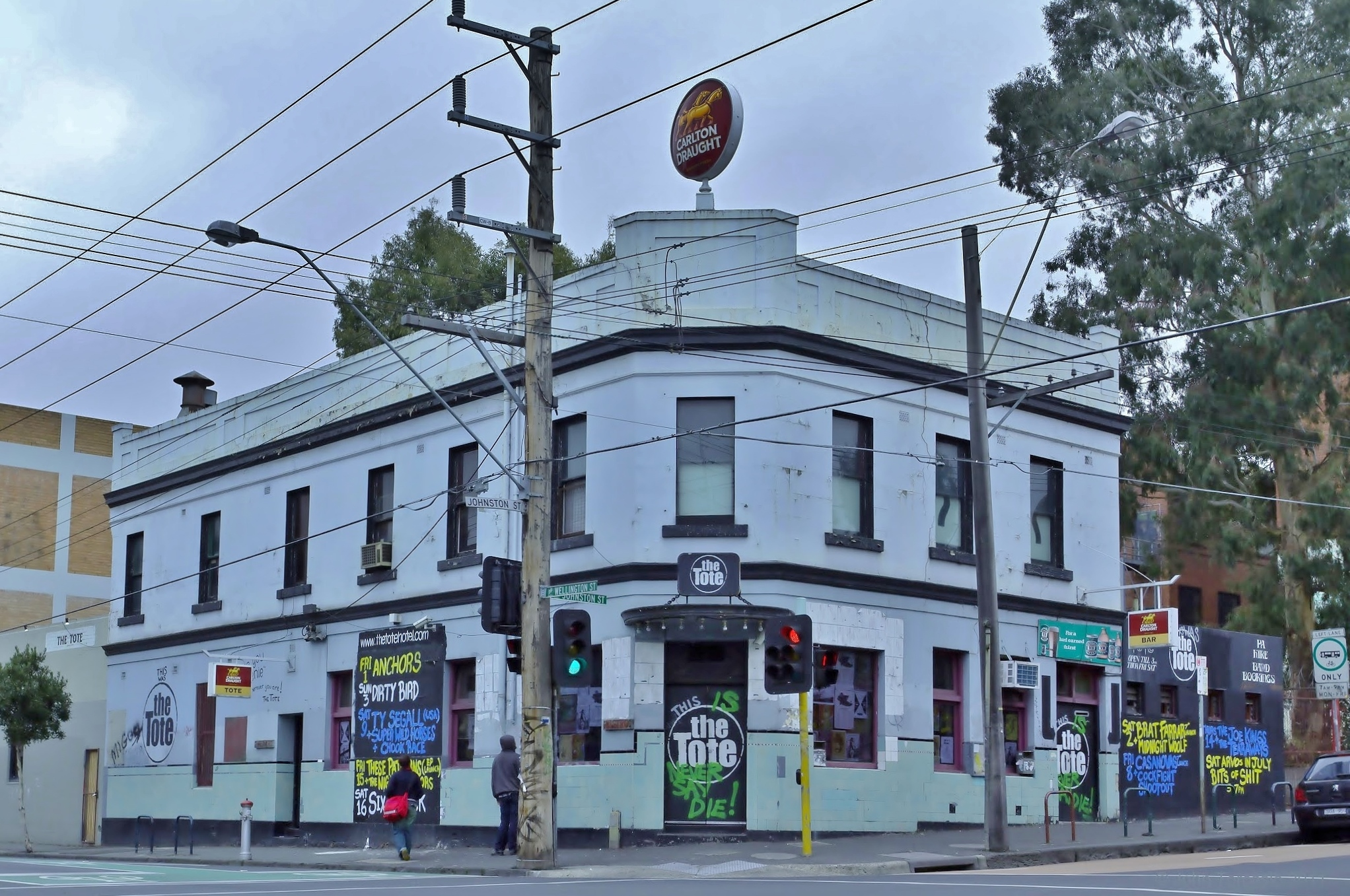
- The Tote Hotel in July 2011
- Interactive map of The Tote Hotel
- Former names: Healey's; The Ivanhoe Hotel
- Location: Collingwood, Melbourne, Victoria, Australia
- Capacity: 408
- Type: Music venue
- Events: Independent music Punk; Alternative; Hardcore; Heavy Metal; Experimental

Construction
- Built: 1870s (original); 1911 (present structure)
- Opened: 1876 (as the Ivanhoe); 1980 (as the Tote)

Website
- www.thetotehotel.com

The Tote is a live music venue, pub and former hotel located in Collingwood, Victoria. The venue hosts many independent local, Australian and international acts, and carries a reputation for showcasing new and emerging independent musical acts of a variety of stylistic origins, having done so since the 1980s. The venue operates 5 days a week with performances across 3 settings, the "main stage", the "cobra bar" and the "front bar". It is located at 67-71 Johnston Street.

The hotel is thought to have been built in 1870 as Healey's, becoming the Ivanhoe Hotel in 1876, and held by the Healey family until 1940, when it was renovated. The name changed to initially "Le Tote" and then eventually "The Tote" in 1980 when the venue began hosting local and Australian punk, post-punk, heavy metal and hardcore bands.

On 15 January 2010, due to high financial costs surrounding disputed liquor licensing laws, it was announced that the venue would be closing that same weekend. A groundswell of community support for the venue and opposition to aspects of liquor licensing laws, quickly mobilised. Several groups on social networking sites quickly sprung up, one such group attracting over 20,000 people. On Sunday the 17th, an estimated crowd of around 2,000 rallied outside the Tote. The events surrounding the closure, the rally and various petitions, sparked public and political debate about liquor licensing laws and live music in Melbourne and Victoria. On 23 February, a much larger rally of at least 10,000, the 2010 Melbourne live music rally, was later held in central Melbourne, that same day amendments to liquor licensing laws were announced. The Tote was eventually reopened and continues to serve the community to the present day.

== Etymology ==
The current venue is most likely named after an illegal betting shop operated by John Wren between 1893 and 1905 which was fictionalised in Frank Hardy's 1950 novel Power Without Glory. The connections between The Tote (hotel) and The Tote (betting shop) are likely to be fictional.

== History ==
Upon the settlement of Collingwood from the 1830s to the 1850s, a dairy farm occupied the area for many years. The first building to occupy the site was a wooden shanty operated by storekeepers Messrs. Howitt and Hale during the 1850s. Daniel Healey, then an uncertificated insolvent, purchased the land in 1867 for £400 and fraudulently transferred the deed by trust to his wife and child, operating the site as a grain store before building a hotel for £740 in about 1870. Daniel Healey was the publican, operating the hotel as 'Healeys', with his wife Bridget Healey. It was not profitable to begin with as Daniel Healey faced a second insolvency for debts amounting to £212 7s in April 1871.

By 1876, the name had become the 'Ivanhoe Hotel', also known as Healey's Ivanhoe Hotel. In his youth, the Healey's son, famous bookmaker Mick Healey, would help run the hotel before obtaining his bookmaker license in 1884. New licensing laws in 1886 saw licensee Bridget Healey before the local courts for having a door open to the bar or unlocked during prohibited hours. Daniel Healey died 14 August 1894 at age 58.

From 1893 to 1905, it has been alleged the venue was used as an illegal betting shop by childhood friend of Mick Healey, John Wren, though this seems unlikely, considering the tea shop likely used as a cover for this gambling was 200m across the road, backing onto Sackville Street. It is around this time that the rumoured tunnels leading from the Tote's cellar to buildings opposite, are suspected to have been constructed.

Bridget Healey died 8 February 1906 and the hotel ownership transferred to her daughters, who leased the hotel out in 1912. It was not always run appropriately with daughter Margaret Walsh attempting to eject holder Eleanor Hunt in 1915 for not conforming to the licensing act by 'supplying a person under 18 years of age with liquor'.

Mick Healey died May 1940 and in June, after being in the possession of the Healey family for more than 70 years, the hotel was purchased by Stanley Bell, of the Eureka Hotel, Richmond. At purchase he stated the intent to make extensive alterations to the building. The exterior tiles and simplified parapet are typical of interwar pub renovations, and so probably date from this time. The upper floor windows and the similar ground floor windows are typically 19th century, so that its 1870 origins are still quite clear.

In 1950, the venue was famously fictionalised in Frank Hardy's 1950 novel Power Without Glory.

In 1980, the venue began operating as firstly "Le Tote" and then eventually "The Tote"

and quickly established itself as a centre of contemporary live music.

=== January 2010 closure ===
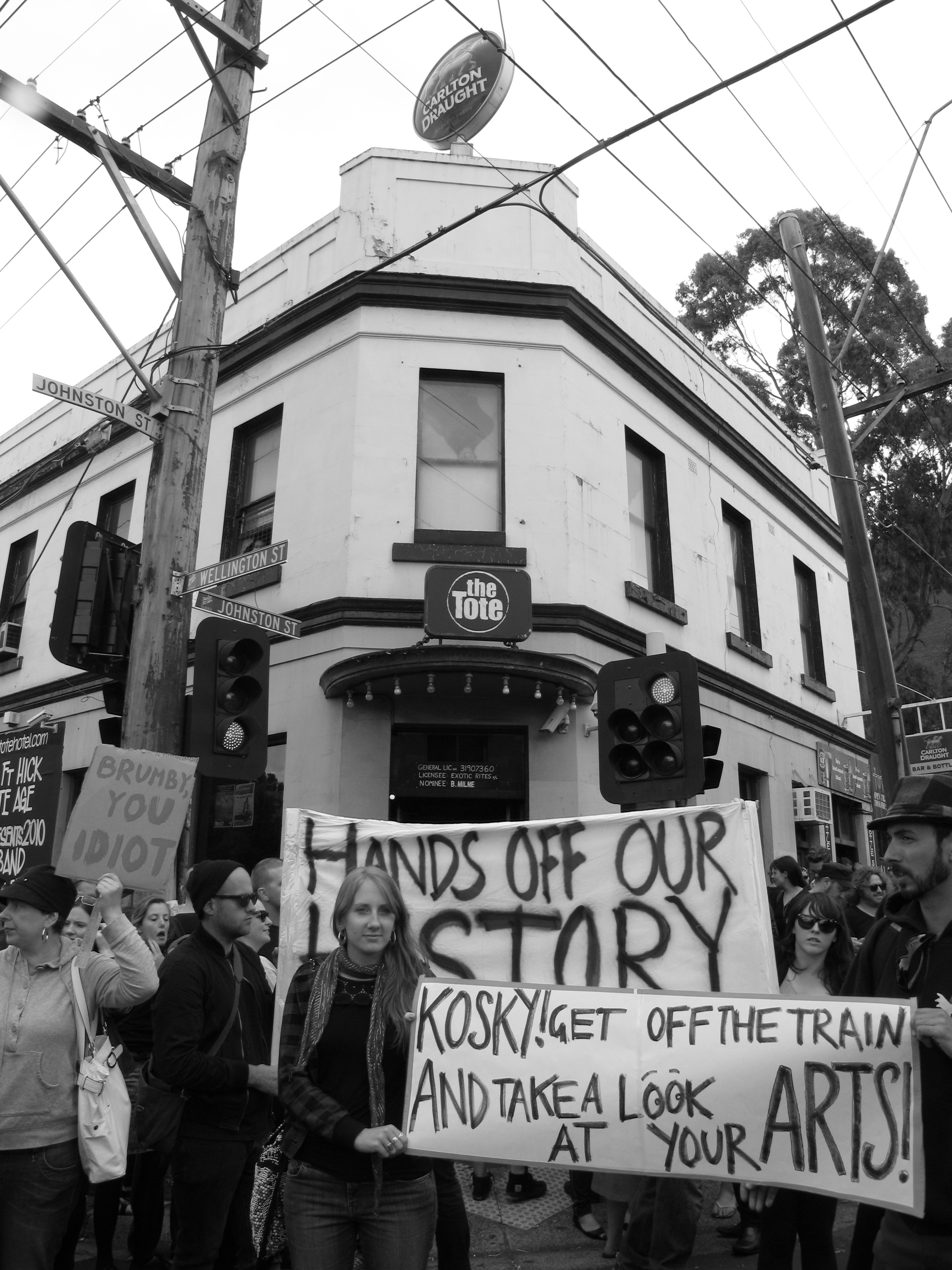
Entrance to the Tote Hotel during the January 2010 closure rally

On 14 January 2010, it was announced that the Tote Hotel would close that same weekend. In the lead-up to the closure, the business owner, Bruce Milne, had been contesting through VCAT, certain conditions and requirements of the "high risk conditions" of Victorian Liquor Licensing laws, imposed upon the venue. The costs of the "high risk" conditions, including CCTV installation and increased security, and high costs of pursuing the case through VCAT, triggered financial strain on the owner, who was forced to close the venue on 14 January. The "high risk conditions" were triggered by the fact that the Tote hosts performance of "live or amplified music". These "high risk" conditions have been the subject of much dispute and debate, prior to and after the closure of the Tote Hotel, with many arguing that the "high risk" conditions should be evidence-based and not triggered merely by the performance of music.

On 17 January, an estimated crowd of between 2,000 and 5,000 rallied outside the Tote, filling the intersection of Johnston and Wellington Streets and spilling down each street. People found other vantage points on rooftops, upper story windows and balconies in the surrounding buildings. Amongst the crowd were amateur and professional photographers, film makers, a Tote documentary crew, various local independent music celebrities and a large collection of Melbourne's local independent musicians, patrons, long-time Tote patrons, former employees and others.

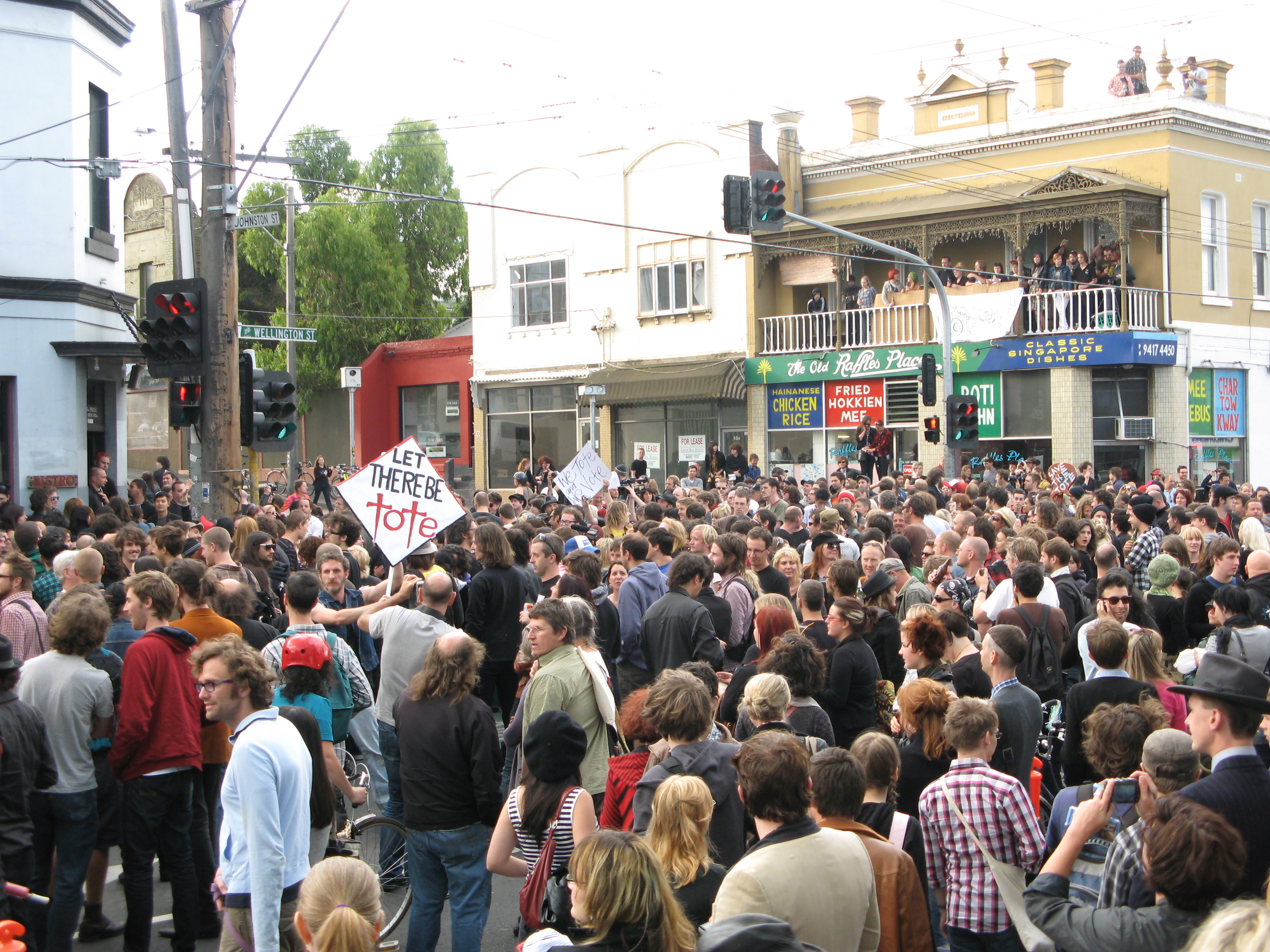
The intersection of Johnston and Wellington Streets, Collingwood, during the rally on 17 January 2010

As the evening progressed, several unsuccessful attempts were made to set up bands in the street. A house in Wellington Street had bands playing within it, while a shopfront at 79 Johnston Street also housed a band called Psychic Temple, featuring members from Melbourne-based outfits Electric Jellyfish, The Morrisons and The Melbourne Bitters. By 10pm, the crowd had been moved to the pathways and around 11pm the intersection was reopened. A large crowd remained at the intersection for some time into the night.

A petition was circulated by "Fair Go 4 Live Music", in response to the Tote's closure, which received over 1,000 signatories. It requests that the high risk conditions only be placed on venues after evidence-based assessment has been made to ascertain their categorisation of being "high risk".

=== Reopening and new owners ===
In April 2010, the Victorian government announced it would soften its approach and allow live music venues to individually apply to have their licensing conditions altered. That month Seventh Tipple, a company which owned a number of other live music venues in Melbourne, signed a new lease on the premise. After a refurbishment, the Tote reopened on 10 June 2010. Seventh Tipple purchased the building from Colonial Leisure Group in 2011 for $1 million.

== 2020 to Saving The Tote ==
In March 2020, the COVID-19 pandemic lockdown forced the Tote to close.

In 2021 it was found that the owners weren't paying the owed superannuation funds for their staff. In March 2023, the Tote's co-owners Jon Perring and Sam Crupi put the venue up for sale.

A crowdfunding campaign with a target of $3 million was launched that month to fund the purchase of the Tote. The effort was run by Shane Hilton and Leanne Chance who run the Last Chance Rock & Roll Bar which is integral to the current music scene in Naarm. The campaign reached its goal in May 2023.

The crowdfunding goal was met by May 2023 but the owners still needed to be pushed to sell the venue in a way that would lead to it being protected from development.

Hilton and Chance put the building into a trust to prevent it from being anything other than a live music venue. Hilton also promised to get the names anyone who donated over $1,000 tattooed on his body.

The venue was sold to Hilton and Chance in September 2023 for an undisclosed sum. Hilton and Chance established the Last Chance Music Foundation, a not-for-profit organisation, to own and preserve the venue.

== Musical highlights ==
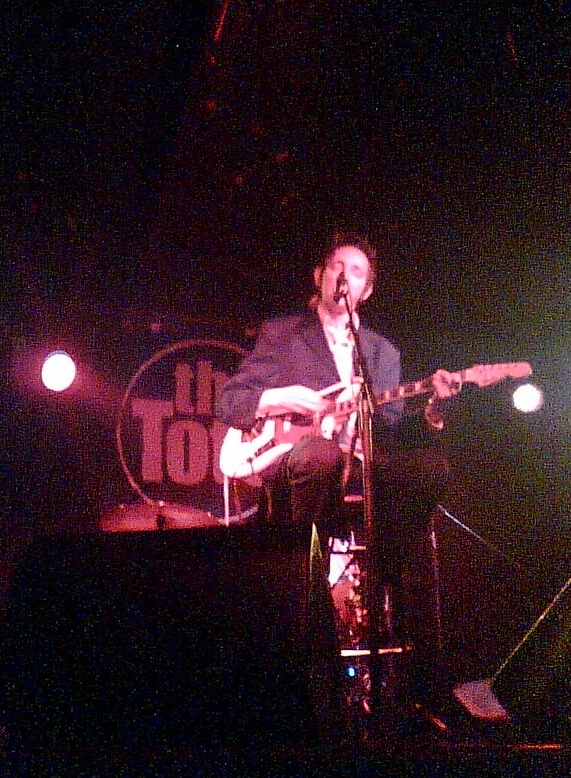
Rowland S. Howard performing at The Tote in 2007

The Tote is often associated with distinctly Australian rock & roll. Groups and artists including The Meanies, Spiderbait, Cosmic Psychos, The Drones, Scourge, Mach Pelican, Magic Dirt, The Birthday Party, The Spazzys, Underground Lovers, Rowland S. Howard, Cold Harbour,and Miss Destiny were regulars at the venue. On 28 September 1986 The Bo-Weevils recorded a performance at the venue, which was issued as Garage Twangin' Retard Rabble Sounds, on cassette later that year.

Larger Australian bands such as Jet,Tame Impala, Silverchair and the Hoodoo Gurus also appeared. The venue hosted many international acts, including The White Stripes, Dead Moon, The Donnas, Viagra Boys, The Troggs, Billy Childish, The Hellacopters, Ty Segall and Mudhoney.

== Rumours and legends ==
=== The Tote Ghost ===
There is a popular myth that a ghost infrequently inhabits the Tote. The ghost is said to be neither friendly nor unfriendly and supposedly inhabits the landing of the stairs (beneath the large 'Cobra Woman' banner) and is apparently always seen making its way upstairs. The ghost is often speculated to be a lost patron looking for the amenities, or a faded rock god whose demise no-one noticed, but the most popular story involves Squizzy Taylor the Melbourne gangster, a rowdy New Year's Eve patron and an uncooperative publican.

The original publicans Daniel Healey passed on residence 1894, and Bridget Healey passed on residence 1906.

On the day of 30 April 1905 a domestic servant named Ellen M'Carthy became the mother of an infant which she put in a box beneath her bed. When seen by another person the child was dead. No violence was involved and charges of concealment of birth were discharged.

=== Tunnels ===
There are persistent rumours of tunnels running from the cellar of the current Tote under Johnston and Wellington Streets to shops opposite. These are supposed to have facilitated get-aways for bookies who used to operate from the pub.

== Awards ==
=== Music Victoria Awards ===
The Music Victoria Awards are an annual awards night celebrating Victorian music. They commenced in 2006. The award for Best Venue was introduced in 2016.

Year	Nominee / work	Award	Result	Ref.
Music Victoria Awards of 2016	The Tote Hotel	Best Venue (Under 500 Capacity)	Won	
Music Victoria Awards of 2017	The Tote Hotel	Best Venue (Under 500 Capacity)	Won	
Music Victoria Awards of 2018	The Tote Hotel	Best Venue (Under 500 Capacity)	Nominated	
Music Victoria Awards of 2019	The Tote Hotel	Best Venue (Under 500 Capacity)	Nominated	
Music Victoria Awards of 2020	The Tote Hotel	Best Venue (Under 500 Capacity)	Nominated	

== Documentary film ==
A documentary film Persecution Blues: The Battle for the Tote, detailing the community's fight to save the hotel, premiered in Melbourne at the 60th Melbourne International Film Festival in July, 2011. It is directed by Natalie van den Dungen and edited by Ken Swallows. Subsequently, the film was picked up by Cinema Nova for cinema release, and aired on ABC Television on 25 January 2012 and 19 January 2016. The film was released on DVD and on iTunes by Madman Entertainment in 2013.

== See also ==
- Music of Melbourne
