= The Yes-Men =

Australian rock band

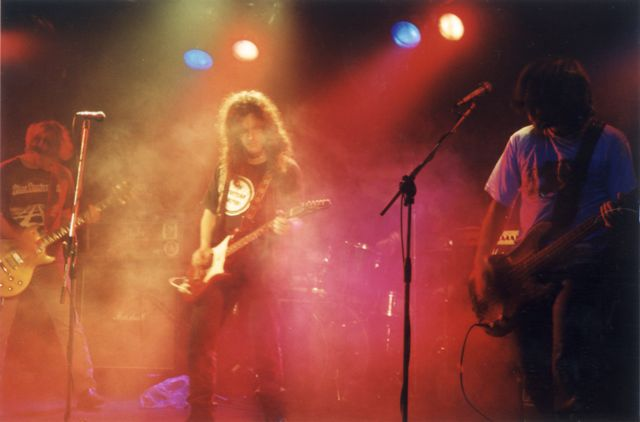

Background information
- Origin: Melbourne, Australia
- Genres: Rock and roll; rock; punk rock
- Years active: 1995–2001
- Labels: Stolen Records; Bang! Records; White Jazz
- Past members: Sean Greenway; Stewart Cunningham; Mark Hurst; Jason Curley; Tasman Blizzard; Matthew Whittle

The Yes-Men were a rock band from Melbourne, Victoria formed by Sean Greenway in 1995. Musically, the band played a style of rock and roll similar to Radio Birdman and Sonic's Rendezvous Band. The band dissolved after Sean Greenway's death on 21 January 2001.

== Background ==
Greenway was a mainstay of the burgeoning Melbourne underground rock scene in the late 1980s and early 1990s. He started his career as a teenager in the band Foot and Mouth, and then formed the band God. God played together from 1986 to 1989 comprising Greenway, Joel Silbersher, Tim Hemensley, and Matthew Whittle. All members were 15 to 16 years old at the time of the band's formation. Prior to God's formation, Hemensley had been a member of Royal Flush (with Roman Tucker, later of Rocket Science), Greenway and Whittle were members of Foot and Mouth, and Silbersher had his own radio show on 3RRR.

God's debut 7" single "My Pal" from 1987 is the band's best known track. Cover versions have been recorded by several bands including Magic Dirt, The Hollowmen, Bored!, A Death In The Family, and Bum.

Following the disbandment of God, Greenway formed the Freeloaders with ex-members of The Philisteins. This lineup of the Freeloaders released a couple of singles through Dog Meat Records before Greenway left in 1995 and formed the Yes-Men.

== History ==
Greenway wrote most of the first Yes-Men songs and began recording these songs prior to even having a band to perform them. He recruited Sydney-based musician and Leadfinger guitarist Stewart Cunningham as lead guitarist, and began rehearsing and arranging the songs with him during visits to Sydney and Melbourne. The first recording sessions for the Yes-Men involved Greenway and Matthew Whittle recording their parts at Birdland Studios in Prahran whilst Cunningham would record his parts in Melbourne. These earlier recordings would eventually surface on the 2005 posthumous self-titled album The Yes-Men (aka El Peligro Ha Comenzado).

Eventually, former Guttersnipes member Mark Hurst was recruited as permanent drummer and Tasman Blizzard of The Meanies became the band's first permanent bass player. The additions solidified the band's lineup for the first time. This lineup recorded the bulk of their debut album Prosody intermittently through 1997 and 1998 at Birdland Studios. Due to other commitments of the band's members and the fact that Cunningham was based in Sydney, the band played live only sporadically but managed three trips to Sydney/NSW and regular spots with the Powder Monkeys. The Yes-Men supported The Hellacopters at The Tote Hotel in 1999 with singer Nicke Royale becoming a big fan of The Yes-Men's music. This support led to Prosody being released in Europe through the Hellacopters' White Jazz record label.

In late 1998, Jay Curley (ex-The Proton Energy Pills and Tumbleweed) replaced Blizzard on bass and the final tracks ("Fawlty Rocks," "Fratricide," "I Won't Run," and "Casting Stones") were recorded. Prosody was finally finished after almost four years of work. Greenway agreed to have Melbourne record label Stolen Records release the album in Australia on vinyl and CD. White Jazz Records would release the album in Europe with the band slated to support the Hellacopters on a Euro tour down the track. Soon after release, the White Jazz label got into legal trouble and were unable to fully promote the album.

On 21 January 2001, Greenway died from an accidental heroin overdose.

A memorial gig was organised for 4 February 2001 at the Tote Hotel in Melbourne, and acts that performed included The Mystaken, Joel Silbersher and Charlie Owen, The Onyas, The Seminal Rats, Powder Monkeys, Rocket Science, The Casanovas and the surviving members of the Yes-Men with Simon Faulkner of Splatterheads on vocals and Matthew Whittle on guitar. The proceeds of the memorial gig were used to finish some leftover recordings and, eventually, a second posthumous album of material was released in 2005 as El Peligro Ha Comenzado on vinyl through Bang! Records and as a self-titled CD album through Butcher's Hook Records.

In 2013, Bang! Records re-issued Prosody.

== Personnel ==
- Sean Greenway - lead vocals, guitar (1995-2001; died 2001)
- Stewart Cunningham - guitar, backing vocals (1995
- Mark Hurst - drums (1995-2001)
- Tasman Blizzard - bass (1995-1998)
- Jay Curley - bass (1998-2000)
- Matthew Whittle - drums, bass (touring member and session musician)

== Discography ==
- Prosody, album, 1999, Stolen Records, White Jazz Records
- The Yes-Men, album, 2005, Bang! Records, Butcher's Hook Records (released on vinyl through Bang! Records as El Peligro Ha Comenzado)
- "The Great Charade", 7" single, 2001, Pitshark Records
- "Fratricide"/"Swept Back", 7" single, 1999, 007 Records
- Prosody (reissue), album, 2013, Bang! Records

Compilations

- "Anglo Girl Desire", Flattery Radio Birdman Tribute Vol 2, 2000, Get Hip Records

== In popular culture ==
Songs originally written and recorded by The Yes-Men have been covered by Swedish band The Hellacopters who included a version of "Acid Reign" as part of the digital-only version of their album Head Off in 2008. Australian band Leadfinger recorded "Swept Back (By the Tide)" in 2008, and "Leaving" was included on their 2011 album We Make the Music.
