= God (Australian band) =

Australian band

- Origin: Melbourne, Victoria, Australia
- Genre: Punk rock
- Years active: 1986–1989
- Label: Au Go Go
- Past members: Sean Greenway; Tim Hemensley; Joel Silbersher; Matthew Whittle
- Website: myspace.com/godaustralia

God (also stylised as GOD) were an Australian punk rock band formed in 1986 by Sean Greenway on guitar and vocals; Tim Hemensley on bass guitar, drums and vocals; Joel Silbersher on guitar and vocals; and Matthew Whittle on bass guitar, drums and vocals. All four were 15-16 at the time. Their signature song, "My Pal", was released as their debut single in January 1988. Their sole studio album, For Lovers Only, appeared in December 1989 after the group disbanded. Sean Greenway died of a heroin overdose on 21 January 2001, aged 30. Tim Hemensley also died of a heroin overdose, on 21 July 2003, aged 31. Whittle curated their 2× CD compilation album, GOD, in February 2010.

== History ==
God were formed in Melbourne in 1986 as a punk rock quartet by Sean Greenway (p.k.a. Sean Scorpion) on guitar and vocals; Tim Hemensley (p.k.a. Meatcleaver Boy) on bass guitar, drums and vocals; Joel Silbersher (p.k.a. Joel Rock'n'Roll) on guitar and vocals; and Matthew Whittle (p.k.a. Matty Mustang) on bass guitar, drums and vocals. All four were 15-16 at the time. Hemensley had been a member of Royal Flush (with Roman Tucker, later of Rocket Science), Greenway and Whittle were members of Foot and Mouth, and Silbersher was a DJ on community radio, 3RRR.

Bruce Milne of Au Go Go Records, who also ran a shop front to sell recordings, met the group's members. He signed them to his label, which issued their debut 7" single, "My Pal", in January 1988. It was written by Silbersher, and received favourable reviews, which sold in the thousands to become, "an enduring Australian underground classic." Australian musicologist, Ian McFarlane, observed, "[they] had an alternative #1 hit on their hands before they were even old enough to get beer riders at their gigs! 'My Pal' was the third biggest selling alternative single for 1988."

Andrew Stafford, writer of Pig City: from the Saints to Savage Garden, listed "My Pal" at No. 24 of his "Australian Songbook" in December 2011. He described how, "Silbersher had this song's circular five-note riff in his head for years before one day, in the shower, the lyric came in a rush: 'You’re my only friend / You don't even like me!' Recorded when most of the band were 17 (the video above captures Silbersher with braces still on his teeth)." Stafford felt, "it was such a towering feat that, unfortunately, it overshadowed everything else they ever did." Cover versions were recorded by several artists: Magic Dirt (1997), Violent Soho, Peabody, Bored!, A Death in the Family, the Hollowmen, and Bum (from Canada). Andrew Mueller of The Guardian declared, "[it] started out as an obscure 7" single and ended up revered as a garage band classic, the Aussie equivalent of 'Wild Thing'."

God released an eight-track extended play, Rock Is Hell, in December 1988, it appeared in four different cover designs, one by each band member, due to the members' inability to agree on a cover. McFarlane felt, "[it] suffered from slop-bucket production values, but was another statement in God's quest for the ultimate so-bad-its-good trash ethic." Rock Is Hell was variously praised and panned by critics, but still sold respectably.

Their full-length studio album, For Lovers Only, appeared in December 1989, via Au Go Go Records which, "boasted stronger production and songs." Although God had disbanded by that time, it was released on vinyl by three European labels. The band's last gig was at the Central Club on 30 July 1989. Au Go Go later released, For Lovers Only, on CD with "My Pal" and most of Rock Is Hell, as bonus tracks.

Greenway founded the Freeloaders with members of the Philisteins before releasing an album with The Yes-Men, which included former members of The Meanies, Guttersnipes and The Proton Energy Pills. Hemensley joined fellow punk rockers, Bored!, in late 1989 on bass guitar and vocals, alongside Justin Munday on drums, John Nolan on guitar and Dave Thomas on guitar and vocals. McFarlane felt he "added much to the band's charisma and sense of arrogance." Hemensley and Nolan formed Powder Monkeys in Melbourne in 1991. Silbersher formed Hoss and then Tendrils, he released solo albums, and worked with Tex Perkins. Whittle played with Patterson's Curse, Sauce, Ripe, Offal Pump, Baby 8, Melwayholics Anonymous and Superlume.

Sean Greenway (born 4 December 1970) died of a heroin overdose on 21 January 2001, aged 30. Tim Hemensley died of a heroin overdose in 2003. "My Pal" appeared on the Underbelly soundtrack for the TV series of the same name. It was used on the Australian TV film, Underground – The Julian Assange Story.

God's self-titled double CD reissue was released on Afterburn Records in February 2010. BMA Magazine's correspondent described the group, "[they] sounded like a ten train smash-up in Tin Railroad Town. They were trying to encapsulate stadium rock and their ‘monster riffs’ often sounded like a playgroup had broken into the bottle recycling bin combined with that siren song of crap amps buzzing and wheezing you sometimes hear just before they blow up."

== Discography ==
=== Studio albums ===
List of EPs, with selected details
Title	Details
For Lovers Only	Released: 1989; Label: Au Go Go(ANDA102); Format: LP, CS, CD

=== Compilation albums ===
List of EPs, with selected details
Title	Details
GOD	Released: February 2010; Label: Afterburn Records (ATB 005); Format: 2×CD, 2×LP

=== Extended plays ===
List of EPs, with selected details
Title	Details
Rock Is Hell	Released: 1988; Label: Au Go Go(ANDA077); Format: LP
