= Tim Hemensley =

- Also known as: Meatcleaver Boy
- Born: Timothy Michael Hemensley; 23 November 1971; Melbourne, Victoria, Australia
- Died: 21 July 2003 (aged 31) Melbourne, Victoria, Australia
- Genres: Punk; garage rock; hard rock
- Occupation: Musician
- Instruments: Bass guitar; lead vocals; drums
- Years active: 1981–2003
- Formerly of: Royal Flush; HJ Premiers; GOD; Bored!; Powder Monkeys

Timothy Michael Hemensley (23 November 1971 – 21 July 2003) was an Australian bass guitarist and singer. He was the front man of Powder Monkeys (1991–2002), a punk, garage and hard rock band. He had been a member of GOD (1986–89), Bored! (1989–91) and the Yes-Men. Hemensley was in his first band at age ten. In 1996 he played bass guitar for Peter Wells (ex-Rose Tattoo). Hemensley died of a heroin overdose on 21 July 2003, aged 31. Hemensley was the son of the poet, Kris Hemensley.

== Biography ==
Timothy Michael Hemensley was born in 1971 and grew up in Melbourne. His father was Kris Hemensley, an English-Australian poet, editor and bookstore co-owner with Retta Hemensley, his mother, who was also a poet. At the age of 10 he played in his first Melbourne-based punk band. By 1984 he was a member of Royal Flush, which recorded two tracks, "Christian Bullshit" and "Coppers 'Round the Corner", for a punk, various artists compilation album, Eat Your Head (1984).

In 1986 Hemensley, a.k.a. Meatcleaver Boy, on bass guitar, drums and vocals, formed a punk rock group, GOD. Fellow founders were Sean Greenway (a.k.a. Sean Scorpion) on guitar and vocals, Joel Silbersher (a.k.a. Joel Rock'n'Roll) on guitar and vocals, and Matthew Whittle (a.k.a. Matty Mustang) on bass guitar, drums and vocals.

In January 1988 GOD released their debut single, "My Pal", via Bruce Milne's record store and related label, Au Go Go Records. Milne later recalled "Joel and Tim [Hemensley] had been coming into my shop [Au Go Go Records] since they could lean over the counter. One day Joel came in and played me the cassette of the song and I thought, 'Oh my god, this is too good to believe. I'm putting this out'." According to Australian musicologist, Ian McFarlane, it was an "astonishing Husker Du-styled" track and they "had an alternative #1 hit on their hands before they were even old enough to get beer riders at their gigs!" The group disbanded ahead of releasing their debut album, For Lovers Only, in December 1989. In 2010 Afterburn records issued a 2× CD compilation album, GOD.

Hemensley, late in 1989, replaced Grant Gardner on bass guitar in Bored!, another punk group, alongside John Nolan on guitar. With Hemensley aboard they released a seven-track extended play, Take It out on You (1990), on Dog Meat Records. Two of its tracks were written by Hemensley: "Conquest" and the title track. McFarlane noticed that "[he] added much to the band's charisma and sense of arrogance." The group toured Europe and, after returning to Australia, both Hemensley and Nolan left Bored! in 1991.

In 1991 Hemensley, on bass guitar and lead vocals, formed a punk group, Powder Monkeys, with Nolan on lead guitar. They were joined by Aydn Hibbert on rhythm guitar and vocals (ex-the Philisteins), Timmy Jack Ray on drums and Jed Sayers on harmonica. Their first gig was at the Great Britain Hotel. McFarlane declared they "were the band to experience in the live arena. The band's hard-driving, seething, strung-out, incendiary blend of punk, high energy rock'n'roll and heavy metal came on like a cross between The Stooges (circa 1973), Motorhead (circa 1976), Rose Tattoo (circa 1978) and US hardcore heroes Black Flag (circa 1980)." He specified that their "Volatile singer/songwriter/bass player [Hemensley] wrote primal, street-level songs like 'Another Nite in Hell', 'I Stand Bare', 'Straight Until Morning' and 'In the Doldrums' that were reflections of his life."

Powder Monkeys debut single, "Yin Yang", appeared in February 1993 via Dog Meat Records. The track was written by Hemensley and was included on their debut album, Smashed on a Knee (March 1994). McFarlane observed "Despite its uneven, rough-hewn quality, [the album] possessed enough moments of sheer excitement and blazing energy to catapult the band to the forefront of the independent scene." Their second album, Time Wounds all Heels, was issued in February 1996.

Hemensley and Ray, while still members of Powder Monkeys, performed a run of gigs during 1996 as members of Peter Wells Band alongside Wells on lead guitar and vocals (ex-Rose Tattoo) and Lucy de Soto, Wells' then-partner, on keyboards and vocals. They recorded an album, Go Ahead Call the Cops, which was released in October with the members co-producing.

Powder Monkeys issued their third album, Lost City Blues, in 2000. In the following year Ray was replaced by Todd McNear. Later that year Nolan had a severe asthma attack and was unable to perform for four months. The group resumed in 2002 and played their last gigs, supporting the Dictators and then Dead Moon, before disbanding by the end of the year. Tim Hemensley died of a heroin overdose on 21 July 2003, aged 31. Expenses for his funeral were covered by a series of benefit concerts.
