= Powder Monkeys =

Australian band

- Origin: Melbourne, Victoria, Australia
- Genre: Punk rock
- Years active: 1991–2002
- Labels: Dog Meat; White Jazz; Death Valley
- Spinoff of: Bored!
- Past members: Tim Hemensley; Adyn Hibberd; John Nolan; Timmy Jack Ray; Jed Sayers; Todd McNear

Powder Monkeys were an Australian punk, indie rock band, formed in 1991. The founding mainstays, Tim Hemensley, on bass guitar and lead vocals and John Nolan on lead guitar were both ex-members of Bored!. Powder Monkeys released three studio albums, Smashed on a Knee (March 1994), Time Wounds all Heels (February 1996) and Lost City Blues (2000), before they broke up in 2002. Tim Hemensley died on 21 July 2003, aged 31, of a heroin overdose.

== History ==
=== 1980s: Pre Powder Monkeys ===
Hemensley had formed GOD as a punk rock group in 1986. Their most popular track, "My Pal", was released as a single in 1987. They disbanded in July 1989 just before their debut album, For Lovers Only, appeared. Hemensley joined Bored! in late 1989 on bass guitar alongside Nolan. The new line-up of Bored! released a seven-track extended play, Take It out on You (1990), on Dog Meat Records. Both left after that band's 1990 tour of Europe. Nolan then played with Hoss for about a year. The Philisteins were formed by Hibberd on guitar, vocals and harmonica in Hobart as a garage punk outfit in 1985 and had relocated to Melbourne in 1990.

=== 1991-2002: Powder Monkeys ===
Powder Monkeys were established in 1991 in Melbourne by Tim Hemensley on bass guitar and lead vocals (ex-Royal Flush, GOD, Bored!), Adyn Hibberd on rhythm guitar and vocals (ex-the Philisteins), John Nolan on lead guitar (ex-Behind the Magnolia Curtain, Bored!), Timmy Jack Ray on drums and Jed Sayers on harmonica. Australian musicologist, Ian McFarlane, observed, "[their] hard-driving, seething, strung-out, incendiary blend of punk, high energy rock'n'roll and heavy metal came on like a cross between the Stooges (circa 1973), Motorhead (circa 1976), Rose Tattoo (circa 1978) and US hardcore heroes Black Flag (circa 1980)." However people with in-depth knowledge of the Powder Monkeys know they were part of an unbroken line that began with bands like the MC5 and the Stooges, in cities like Chicago, Detroit and New York. It became known as 'punk' and arrived in Australia with the Saints and Radio Birdman. It was that first wave of punk, not the 'hardcore punk' (that came out of the USA after the Sex Pistols) that fans recognised as being in the marrow of the Powder Monkeys. They remain highly respected among punk musicians and fans worldwide.

Powder Monkeys first performed in late 1991 at the Great Britain Hotel, Richmond. Hibberd left around June of the following year. He was recorded on their first single, "Yin Yang", which was released in February 1993 on Dog Meat Records. Hibberd's guitar work appears on a few tracks of the band's first album, Smashed on a Knee, recorded in 1992; also one track he wrote and sang, "Ugly", was included. The album was released on Dog Meat in March 1994. McFarlane opined, "Despite its uneven, rough-hewn quality, [the album] possessed enough moments of sheer excitement and blazing energy to catapult the band to the forefront of the independent scene."

Powder Monkeys increased their live performances during 1994 and supported tours by Deniz Tek Group and by Billy Thorpe and the Aztecs. Jed Sayers left at the end of that year and the band continued as a three-piece. They performed at the Big Day Out in Melbourne early in the following year. Their next release, in February 1995, was a five-track EP Straight Until Morning, which was recorded by the Hemensley, Nolan and Ray line-up for a Triple J live broadcast.

In November 1995 they supported United States hardcore singer, Henry Rollins, and then supported the re-formed Australian pre-punk rockers, Radio Birdman, in January 1996. Powder Monkeys released a single, "The Supernova That Never Quits" in December 1995, ahead of their second album, Time Wounds all Heels in February 1996. It was produced by Chris Thompson, with McFarlane declaring, "[it] was almost the definitive example of the band's skilful, diamond-hard blues thrash." Tharunka's reviewer noticed that the band members, "have all had Seattle-grunge bypass operations, allowing them to get on with some serious rock action" and that the album, "is powerful, basic and honest rock'n'roll, played with instinct and the amps turned up loud."

Hemensley and Ray also performed and recorded with the Peter Wells Band in 1996, which resulted in an album, Go Ahead Call the Cops, produced by the band and released in October that year on Dog Meat and Shock Records. There was interest from the US music industry's American Recordings in a local release of Time Wounds All Heels and a tour, but nothing resulted. Powder Monkeys spent most of 1997 in hiatus and re-emerged in August 1997 with a single, "Get the Girl Straight" (400 copies, red vinyl), on the Death Valley label.

Most of 1998 was spent touring. A live album, Blood Sweat & Beers, was recorded at a gig at The Espy, Melbourne in April. It was released early in 1999 on Safety Pin Records (Spain) and on CD via Butcher's Hook Records (United Kingdom). They supported a gig by Swedish garage rockers, the Hellacopters in October in Melbourne. They followed with a European tour from March 1999 for three months. While on tour they recorded two tracks, "Two Tub Man" and "Destination X", both released as split 7-inch singles with the other tracks by the Hellacopters.

Powder Monkeys also recorded a new studio album, Lost City Blues which was released in 2000, with Swedish producer, Fred Estby on their White Jazz label. The album has never seen an Australian release. An EP was also recorded in Spain, Talk Softly & Carry a Big Shtick, which was released on Punch Records.

Timmy Jack Ray departed the group shortly after and was replaced by Todd McNear on drums (ex-Seminal Rats). John Nolan had a near-fatal heart attack in 2001, the result of his heroin use, and was left with slightly impaired motor skills. He later reflected on his addiction, "It never affected playing live or touring but I do remember a few times during the recording when I would have to wait until my dealer rocked up at the studio in the morning for me to pretty much 'get going' and stop feeling like total crap and start playing." Nolan spent several months recovering, and the group reconvened in 2002, recording a song for the Dirty Deeds soundtrack as well as a cover of legendary Detroit band The Dogs' "Black Tea". They played their first gig in over a year at the Tote, supporting punk legends The Dictators, and shortly after supporting Dead Moon. These were to be the last Powder Monkeys gigs.

After a lengthy addiction to heroin, Tim Hemensley died from an overdose on 21 July 2003, aged 31. It was a devastating blow to the Melbourne rock scene, which had been severely depleted in previous years with the deaths of Guy Lucas (the Philisteins, Freeloaders), Mick Weber (Seminal Rats), and Sean Greenway (GOD, Freeloaders, The Yes-Men).

The final recordings by Powder Monkeys were compiled on a CD, Outta Control Rock'n'Roll, released posthumously on the Dropkick label in 2005. It included three new songs recorded live at Greenway's wake in 2001, as well as studio recordings of cover versions including the Stooges' "Cock in My Pocket", a staple of their live sets. The group were reformed in July 2013 by Nolan and Ray using guest vocalists in tribute to Hemensley on the tenth anniversary of his death.

Nolan died in December 2021.

== Discography ==
=== Studio albums ===
Title	Details
Smashed on a Knee	Released: March 1994; Label: Dog Meat Records (DOG052CD); Format: CD
Time Wounds all Heels	Released: February 1996; Label: Dog Meat Records (DOG073CD); Format: CD
Lost City Blues	Released: 2000; Label: White Jazz Records (JAZZ024CD); Format: CD

=== Live albums ===
Title	Details
Blood Sweat & Beers	Released: 1999; Label: Butcher's Hook Records (HOOK 005LIVE); Format: CD
Live...Live...Live	Released: 2004; Label: Powder Monkeys; Format: CDr (limited to 500 copies); Note: Recorded in 1994

=== Extended plays ===
Title	Details
Straight Until Morning	Released: 1995; Label: Dog Meat Records (DOG067CD); Format: CD
The Supernova That Never Quits	Released: December 1995; Label: Dog Meat Records (DOG076CD); Format: CD
Talk Softly & Carry a Big Shtick	Released: 1999; Label: Punch Records (Punch 014CD); Format: CD, LP
Outta Control Rock'n'Roll	Released: 2005; Label: Dropkick (BEHIND034); Format: LP; Note: Live EP recorded in 1995 and 2001.
