= The Throwaways =

Alternative rock group

Throwaways were an alternative rock group which performed from 1989 to 1995. They were formed by Sean Baxter (drums), Mat Butler (vocals and guitar), Marc Dorey (guitar) and Dave Kendal (bass guitar). In 1993 Matt Charles replaced Butler. The group recorded two studio albums, Angle Grinder (1992) and Postmadonna Primadonna (January 1994).

== Formation ==
Meeting at high school in the mid-1980s in the provincial city of Geelong, Mat Butler and Marc Dorey proposed the formation of what would become Throwaways. Influenced heavily by mid-1960s British Beat acts such as The Kinks and The Who, and US acts such as the Velvet Underground and The Doors, they gravitated toward the then underground Australian scene of the era, where acts as the Hoodoo Gurus, the Stems, Huxton Creepers and the Go Betweens were producing a range of 1960s garage-influenced post-punk tunes.

The first musical output at this point was limited to a rough demo of several songs recorded by Dorey and Butler on a portable cassette deck modified by Butler to permit lo-fi multitracking.

In 1987 Butler & Dorey moved to Melbourne. At University College, Dorey met fellow resident David Kendal, and in 1988 Sean Baxter. A fellow resident of the college was Mark Maher ("Kram"), later of Spiderbait, with whom Throwaways, Guttersnipes and the Meanies would release the "Teeth" compilation.

== First lineup ==
In late 1988 Kendal (bass), Baxter (drums), Dorey (guitar), Butler (vocals and guitar) held the first rehearsal of Throwaways (although the name was not coined at this time), in a corrugated iron shed at Kendal's Bacchus Marsh house. Also in attendance at this rehearsal was Ricky Drewitt (guitar). Essentially a free-from feedback jam, with occasional segues in to lyrical/chord motifs provided by Butler, the session laid the groundwork for the band's melodic noise aesthetic. The rehearsal saw the first airing of songs that later became fixtures of early live sets such as "Tarmac", "Violent", and "Girl in the Lava Lamp". This session culminated in the members propping their respective instruments up against amplifiers left at full volume, and exiting the shed to spend the rest of the night drinking beer and listening to the resulting wall of noise over several hours.

Through 1989 the Kendal-Baxter-Dorey-Butler line-up rehearsed a 30-minute set of tunes that saw the initial 60s pop aesthetic mesh with a more hardcore approach to instrumentation indicated by the Detroit punk school, especially as practised by antipodean exponents such as The Saints and Radio Birdman, with occasional forays into Who-esque jams. These rehearsals led to the first show as an entrant in a 'battle of the bands' competition held at Melbourne University in late 1989, supporting a Cosmic Psychos show. While the band clearly won over the punk-oriented crowd with a swift 15-minute set culminating in a self-indulgent display of feed back and instrument destruction, the competition's judges were not so swayed, and The Throwaways failed to make the next heat of the contest.

In the early 1990s Throwaways, together with label mates, Spiderbait and Guttersnipes, organised and performed at the Tell 'em It's Healthy series of concerts. Throwaways were regular fixtures on Melbourne's inner city alternative music scene, playing at venues such as The Tote, The Punters Club, The Great Britain Hotel and the Richmond Club. During Easter 1991 the group performed at The Tote, sharing the stage with Hoss, The Meanies, Guttersnipes, Spiderbait, Nursery Crimes and Unclean Spirits. A live album, Wally's Wild Weekend, was issued in January 1992 with two tracks by each artist.

== Second lineup ==
In 1993 Butler left the group, but remained an active supporter and counsel. He was replaced by Mat Charles, whose arrival introduced a new aesthetic strain inspired by Captain Beefheart and early 80s goth/punk practitioners such as the Birthday Party and Einsturzende Neubauten.

These influences meshed with three emerging aesthetic streams within the band that saw a move away from its 60s pop origins : avant-garde jazz; Alternative Tentacles art-punk acts such as NoMeansNo and the Dead Kennedys; and metal influences such as Napalm Death and Slayer. The results of this direction, PostMadonna Primadonna, were recorded by producer Simon Grounds and released by Dr Jim's Records. The album included a cover version of "Black Sabbath" by the band of the same name. Throwaways disbanded in 1995.

Sean Baxter was later a member of Bucketrider, and then Lazy. He also had a solo career.

== Discography ==
=== Albums ===
- Angle Grinder (1992) Au Go Go Records (ANDA 148)
- Postmadonna Primadonna (January 1994) Dr Jim's Records (DR JIM 009)

=== Other appearances ===
- "Without You", "Transit to Venus" and "Girlfriend's Gone" on Boogie Wonderland (split album by The Throwaways, The Meanies, and Nice Girls from Cincinnati) (April 1990) Au Go Go Records (ANDA 113)
- "Beast" on Teeth (four-track split EP by The Throwaways, Spiderbait, Guttersnipes, The Meanies) (December 1991) Au Go Go Records (ANDA 140)
- "Ivy Trueman" and "Satanville (Televegetable Termination)" on Wally's Wild Weekend (live album by various artists) (January 1992) Au Go Go Records (ANDA 141)
