= Cosmic Psychos =

Australian punk rock band

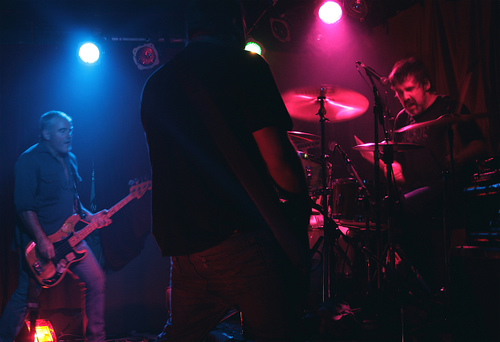
- Cosmic Psychos, left to right: Ross Knight, John McKeering, Dean Muller; Performing in June 2007.

Background information
- Also known as: Spring Plains
- Origin: Melbourne, Victoria, Australia
- Genres: Punk rock, pub rock, grunge
- Years active: 1982–present
- Labels: Mr Spaceman, Survival, Amphetamine Reptile, City Slang, Shagpile, Shock, Timberyard, Pitshark, Missing Link
- Members: Ross Knight; John "Mad Macka" McKeering
- Past members: Peter "Dirty" Jones; Steve Morrow; Neil Turton-Lane; Bill Walsh; Robbie Watts; Dean Muller

Cosmic Psychos are an Australian punk rock band which formed in 1982 as Spring Plains. The band's first stabilised lineup included Ross Knight on bass guitar and vocals, Peter Jones on guitar, and Bill Walsh on drums. With Morrow's departure in late 1984 the group were renamed as Cosmic Psychos. They issued their debut album, Down on the Farm, in December 1985. Several albums have followed and were backed by national tours and international tours to Europe and North America including festivals with Mudhoney, Nirvana, L7, Helmet and Motörhead. In 1990 Jones was replaced by Robbie Watts on guitar. By 2005 Walsh was replaced by Dean Muller (Hoss, Chris Russell's Chicken Walk) on drums. On 1 July 2006 Watts died of a drug overdose, aged 47, and the band continued with John McKeering (ex-The Onyas) joining.

== History ==
Cosmic Psychos developed from Spring Plains which formed in 1982 in Melbourne with a line-up of Peter Jones on guitar and vocals; Steve Morrow on lead vocals; Neil Turton-Lane on bass guitar; and Bill Walsh on drums and vocals. According to Australian rock music historian, Ian McFarlane, their music was "arty kind of punk noise, somewhere between The Birthday Party and a more narcotic sounding Ramones". In 1984 the group recorded a track, "American Hymn", for a various artists compilation, Asleep at the Wheel. Late that year Morrow and Turton-Lane were replaced by Ross Knight (ex-Rancid Spam) on bass guitar and lead vocals. They financed a self-released cassette which included "Custom Credit".

By early 1985, the group were performing as Cosmic Psychos, which McFarlane felt used "equal parts Stooges riffs, Ramones tempos, lashings of wah wah guitar, American 1980s hardcore attitude and a healthy dose of yobbo humour. [They] played no-frills, stripped-down punk rock". In December 1985 they issued a five-track mini-LP, Down on the Farm, on Mr Spaceman Records. It included "Custom Credit" and was produced by Ross Giles (Depression). In October 1987 they issued a single, "Lead Me Astray", which was co-written by Walsh, Knight and Jones. In December Mr Spaceman Records followed with the band's debut self-titled LP, which was produced by Rene Roth. In June 1989 a performance at Melbourne's The Palace was recorded and issued in November 1990 as their first live album, Slave to the Crave. An early band manager was Neil Rogers (of The Bo-Weevils, and a 3RRR radio show host).

Cosmic Psychos signed to Survival Records and in December 1989 released, Go the Hack, which was produced by John Bee (Dynamic Hepnotics, Eurogliders). In 1990 the album was released on Sub Pop Records into North America. Allmusic's Patrick Kennedy found it was "dirty, mean, simple, garagey punk rock & roll. Dr. Knighty's vocals and lyrics evince the rough-hewn stain of manual labor, tempered with a night out at the pub. In other words, this is a working man's rock band". A single, "Lost Cause", appeared with the album, with writing credits to Walsh, Knight and Jones. Early in 1990 Jones left to join Enter the Vertex and Robbie "Rocket" Watts (ex-I Spit on Your Gravy, Quivering Quims) replaced him on guitar.

The group signed to Amphetamine Reptile Records for the American market for their 1991 album, Blokes You Can Trust. Production duties were by Butch Vig, fresh from completing Nirvana's Nevermind, at his Smart Studios in Wisconsin. Blokes You Can Trust provided two singles, "Dead Roo" (October 1991), which shed light on some Australian highway hazards; and "Back at School" (May 1992) which was a shared single with L7's "Shove". In May 1993 the band released a six-track extended play, Palomino Pizza, on the local Arschlock/Shagpile label, which was distributed by Shock Records. It included cover versions of Lobby Loyde's "G.O.D.", Billy Thorpe & the Aztecs' "Most People I Know" and Buffalo's "Sunrise"; and three originals.

They followed with two studio albums on Arschlock/Shagpile distributed by Shock Records, Self Totalled (1995) and Oh What a Lovely Pie (August 1997), which appeared on Amphetamine in America. For Self Totalled the band's members were given pseudonyms: "Fess Parker" on guitar, "Slapper Jackson" on bass guitar and lead vocals, and "Billy Arschlock" on drums and vocals; while their producer, Lindsay Gravina, was "Big Vinny" Gravina. Kennedy described the work as "[p]erhaps the band's most full-realized album, Self-Totalled doesn't deviate from the band's formula of hard driving rhythms, fuzzed out guitars, humorously sneering vocals, and true-to-the-bone working man's attitude. In fact, it builds on that formula: The melodies show better craftsmanship, the band is tighter, and the engineering is perfect". Associated singles were "Neighbours" (August 1994) and "Whip Me" (June 1996).

The band had appeared at the 1995 Big Day Out tour and returned for the 1997 tour. Gravina also produced Oh What a Lovely Pie. Kennedy felt it was "the sound of a band at its creative end, trying, perhaps to keep a torch lit that would prefer to yield to the wind ... Not to say – even for a minute – that the band doesn't have its merits, or that this is a bad album ...but this one shows a once proud formula grown tired of its own reflection". Also that year United Kingdom band, The Prodigy, covered a version of L7's track, "Fuel My Fire", which itself was based on the Cosmic Psychos' tune, "Lost Cause". "Fuel My Fire" is credited to D Sparks (L7), Walsh, Knight and Jones.

In 2001 the group issued a compilation album, 15 Years, a Million Beers, in both 2× CD and 2× LP formats on Dropkick Records. Also that year Knight was in a side-project, Dung, as "Standin Dung" on bass guitar and lead vocals; with Dean Muller (ex-Hoss) as "Kerry-Anne Dung" on drums; and Kieran Clancy as "Chairman Mao Tse Dung" on guitar and vocals. They released their debut album, Who Flung, on Shock Records, which was produced by Gravina. In 2006, Cosmic Psychos issued their first studio album for nine years, Off Ya Cruet, on Sydney's Timberyard Records with Gravina producing. In late 2005 Walsh had been replaced by Knight's bandmate from Dung, Muller (ex-Voodoo Lust). The opening track on the album is "Kill Bill", a bitter song about Walsh; which was written by Knight. i94Bar's The Barman found that "there's a consistently focused edge in what the Psychos do that makes them sound more than a little wired and seriously unhinged. When Ross Knight sings about sending a former drummer to meet his maker ("Kill Bill") by severing his head, you just know he means it".

While on a tour promoting the album, Cosmic Psychos were in Bendigo for a gig, the following morning on 1 July 2006 Robbie "Rocket" Watts died in a friend's kitchen from a heroin overdose. The group decided to continue with John "Mad Macka" McKeering (The Onyas) on guitar. The Barman noted that McKeering "has slotted in a treat on guitar, mining the same stylistic ground but retaining his own sound". On 9 June 2007 they released their next studio album, Dung Australia, with a cover of Buffalo's song "Skirtlifter". In July that year they released Off Ya Cruet! on the European label, Pitshark Records with a different digipak cover. On 13 December 2008, Pitshark issued Dung Australia with a bonus unreleased track, "Anarchy in Boondall".

In April 2011 Cosmic Psychos released a new studio album, Glorius Barsteds, which appeared on Missing Link Records in a 2× CD format. Mess+Noise's Patrick Emery felt "[t]hankfully, they're still on the same fuzz-laden straight-and-narrow road to the pub they've always been on ... The paradox of [their] simplistic formula is the astute social commentary that lies just beneath the rough-as-guts surface". In 2012 the band was the subject of a proposed biographical documentary, Cosmic Psychos: Blokes You Can Trust, directed and produced by Matt Weston. The film includes interviews with Knight and Walsh; and fans of the band including Eddie Vedder (Pearl Jam), Butch Vig, Mudhoney and The Melvins. In November 2012 one of the band's last performances at The Tote – the venue was subsequently closed down – was filmed and is to be released with the documentary as a bonus disc. Madison Thomas reviewed the third performance at The Tote for Tone Deaf, "[t]he band plays relentlessly, barely stopping to catch their breath but making enough time for Knight to pound down a never ending supply of Pure Blonde sitting atop his amp ... Muller's drums are viciously belted ... McKeering noodles away sludgily on 'Custom Credit' and battles on against foldback problems".

=== Robbie "Rocket" Watts (1959–2006) ===
Robert John "Rocket" Watts (22 January 1959 – 1 July 2006) joined Cosmic Psychos in early 1990 as a replacement on lead guitar for Peter "Dirty" Jones. Watts was the son of Rex and Mavis Watts and grew up in Malvern with Rex jr (older brother), Wendy and Helen (older sisters). He attended Melbourne High School and learned guitar from Rex jr. In the early 1980s he lived in Castlemaine with his partner Vivienne Ward, the couple had a daughter, Rani. By mid-1980s Watts had moved to St Kilda where he became a member of punk band, I Spit on Your Gravy, with Fred Negro on drums and lead vocals. Watts also joined Quivering Quims, a "punk cocktail trio". Watts had another long-term partner, Narelle Duff, and the couple had three children, Bill, Daniel, and Lily.

Watts' first album with Cosmic Psychos was Blokes You Can Trust in 1991. McFarlane noted "[their] sound altered very little with the new addition". Watts remained the band's sole lead guitarist until his death on 1 July 2006 of a drug overdose, following a show in Bendigo, Victoria to promote Off Ya Cruet!. Watts was 47 years old, leaving four children. Later that month a benefit gig was organised for Watts' families. Acts appearing included Cockfight Shootout, Hoss, Ian Rilen and the Love Addicts, Mach Pelican, The Meanies, The Onyas, The Specimens and The Strays. On 9 June 2007 Cosmic Psychos released their next studio album, Dung Australia, which was "Dedicated to the memory of Robbie 'Rocket' Watts 1959 - 2006" and included a cover of Buffalo's song "Skirtlifter", which had been recorded earlier with Watts supplying a guitar solo.

== Musical style ==
Known for their droning, fuzzed-out bass and wah-wah guitar with repetitive lyrics, the Cosmic Psychos have a simple sound that has remained relatively unchanged since they formed in 1982.

== Television appearances ==
The band appeared on the RMITV show Under Melbourne Tonight on 19 June 1996.

== Members ==
=== Current members ===
- Ross Knight – lead vocals, bass guitar (1982–present)
- John McKeering – guitar, backing and occasional lead vocals (2006–present)

=== Current touring musicians ===
- BC Michaels – drums, backing vocals (2024–present)
- Dan Peters – drums, backing vocals (2025–present; substitute for BC Michaels)

=== Former members ===
- Peter Jones – guitar, backing vocals (1982–1990)
- Steve Morrow – lead vocals (1982)
- Neil Turton-Lane – bass guitar (1982)
- Bill Walsh – drums, backing vocals (1982–2005)
- Robbie Watts – guitar, backing vocals (1990–2006; his death)
- Dean Muller – drums, backing and occasional lead vocals (2005–2024)

== Discography ==
=== Studio albums ===
Title	Details	Peak chart positions
Title	Details	AUS
Cosmic Psychos	Released: 1987; Label: Mr. Spaceman (MRSM 08); Format: LP, Cassette, CD	—
Go the Hack	Released: 1989; Label: Survival (465782.1-465782.4); Format: LP, Cassette, CD	—
Blokes You Can Trust	Released: 1991; Label: Survival (469150.1-469150 .4); Format: LP, Cassette, CD	—
Self Totalled	Released: 1995; Label: Shagpile, Arschloch (SHAGCD2025); Format: LP, CD	—
Oh What a Lovely Pie	Released: 1997; Label: Shagpile, Arschloch (SHAGCD2037); Format: LP, CD	—
Off Ya Cruet!	Released: 2005; Label: Timberyard (T15125); Format: CD	—
Dung Australia	Released: 2007; Label: Timberyard Recds (T4527); Format: CD, digital download	—
Glorius Barsteds	Released: 2011; Label: Missing Link (LINK'D 005); Format: 2×CD, digital download	—
Cum the Raw Prawn	Released: January 2015; Label: Desperate (DEFCON11CD/DEFCON11LP); Format: LP, CD, digital download	—
Loudmouth Soup	Released: April 2018; Label: Go the Hack (GTH001); Format: LP, CD, digital download, streaming	37
Mountain of Piss	Released: 9 July 2021; Label: Go the Hack; Format: LP, CD, digital download, streaming	19
I Really Like Beer	Released: 7 November 2025; Label: Subway; Format: LP, CD, digital download, streaming	32

=== Live albums ===
Title	Details
Slave to the Crave: Live at the Palace, Melbourne	Released: 1990; Label: Rattlesnake Records (RAT 505, RAT CD 19); Format: LP, Cassette, CD
Live at DB'S 2005	Released: 2005 (The Netherlands); Label: DB'S Records (DBS RECORDS 50); Format: Limited to 500 CD copies
Hooray Fuck: Live at the Tote Hotel, Melbourne	Released: 2013 (The Netherlands); Label: Cobra Snake Necktie Records, Love & Theft (CSNT11, LNT019); Format: 2x LP

=== Compilation albums ===
Title	Details
15 Years, a Million Beers	Released: 2001; Label: Dropkick (Behind007); Format: 2xCD, 2xLP

=== Extended plays ===
Title	Details
Down on the Farm	Released: December 1985; Label: Mr Spaceman (MRSM 003); Format: LP
Palomino Pizza	Released: May 1993; Label: Arschloch Records (ARSCH001); Format: LP, Cassette, CD

== Awards and nominations ==
=== AIR Awards ===
The Australian Independent Record Awards (commonly known informally as AIR Awards) is an annual awards night to recognise, promote and celebrate the success of Australia's Independent Music sector.

Year	Nominee / work	Award	Result
2011	Glorious Basterds	Best Independent Hard Rock/Punk Album	Nominated

=== ARIA Music Awards ===
The ARIA Music Awards is an annual awards ceremony that recognises excellence, innovation, and achievement across all genres of Australian music.

Year	Nominee / work	Award	Result
2011	Glorious Basterds	Best Hard Rock/Heavy Metal Album	Nominated
2026	I Really Like Beer	Best Hard Rock/Heavy Metal Album	Nominated

=== Music Victoria Awards ===
The Music Victoria Awards, are an annual awards night celebrating Victorian music. They commenced in 2005. (Awards between 2005 and 2012 are unknown)

Year	Nominee / work	Award	Result
2014	themselves	Best Live Act	Nominated
2014	themselves	Best Regional Act	Won
2015	themselves	Best Regional Act	Won
2017	themselves	Best Regional Act	Won
