= Seminal Rats =

Australian band

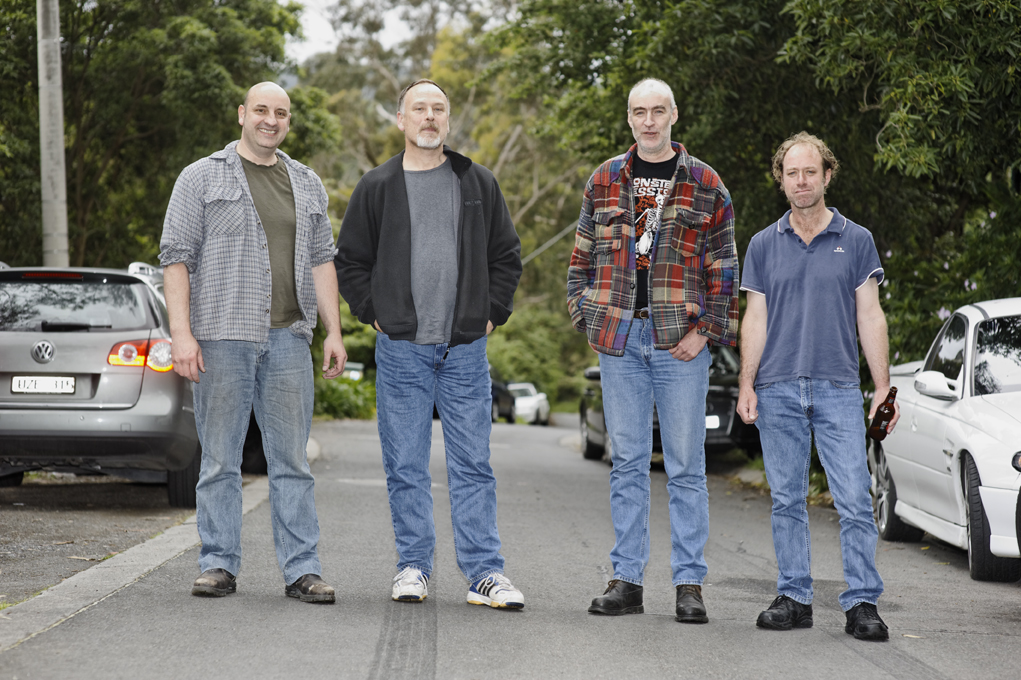
- Seminal Rats, 2011

Background information
- Also known as: Cantankerous
- Origin: Melbourne, Victoria, Australia
- Genres: Punk; indie rock
- Years active: 1984–1999
- Label: Bang!
- Past members: Dave Balsamo; Michael Harley; Todd McNeair; Reubin Pinkster; Michael Weber; Ian Wettenhall

Seminal Rats were an Australian punk, indie rock band which existed from 1984 until the death of their lead guitarist, Michael Weber, in January 1999. The band's members were vocalist Michael Harley, guitarist Ruebin Pinkster, bassist Dave Balsamo (1984–93), then bassist Ian Wettenhall (1993–98), and drummer Todd McNeair.

== History ==
Michael Weber 1989

Seminal Rats were formed in Melbourne in 1984 as a punk, indie rock band by Dave Balsamo on bass guitar, Michael Harley on lead vocals, Todd McNeair on drums, Reubin Pinkster on guitar and Michael Weber on lead guitar. McNeair, Pinkster and Weber had formed a band, Skippy, while at secondary school. Harley recalled forming Seminal Rats: "they were looking for a bass player, and Dave's name came up. For some reason I went along with him to the audition, and they were jamming, playing songs I knew – Stooges songs and stuff – so I sang along, and ended up becoming the singer."

The group's debut album, Omnipotent, appeared in 1986 on the Mr. Spaceman label. It was recorded at Sound Concept studio with the band producing. They followed with a five-track extended play, Hot Snapper Pie, in 1988, which was recorded at Silkwood Studios with Greg Heenan producing.

In the late 1980s McNeair and Weber formed the Slush Puppies with Shane Grubb on bass guitar and Phil Rose on lead vocals. They released a single, "You're So Perfect", in December 1988 but disbanded soon after with Rose going on to form the hard rockers, Nursery Crimes, early in the next year. Seminal Rats issued a live album, ''Life in the Necropolis, in 1990 – it had been recorded in the previous year by live audio engineer, Andy Turner, and recording and post-production by Simon Grounds. McNeair and Weber formed Hoss, another hard rock group, in 1990 with Scott Bailey on bass guitar and Joel Silbersher on guitar and lead vocals (ex-God). McNeair and Weber returned to Seminal Rats early in 1992.

Michael Weber 1998

A second live album, Plectrum Muscle (1998), was issued by the group under the name, Cantankerous, via Rat Race Records. In January 1999, Michael Weber died of a heroin overdose; Seminal Rats broke up, although they periodically returned to performing either as Cantankerous or under their original name.

Michael Harley 2005

A 2× CD compilation album, The Essential Seminal Rats 1984-1991, was issued in August 2007, Trevor Block of Mess+Noise noticed, "[they] erupted into this landscape and quickly gained a firm foothold. Five suburban lads with no sense of fashion, or coolness, just a fervent desire to play music that burned the ear the same way their own favourites did... [Weber and Harley] had an amazing degree of technical skill matched with powerful onstage presence, knowing just when to push and when to pull back."

The Seminal Rats 2008

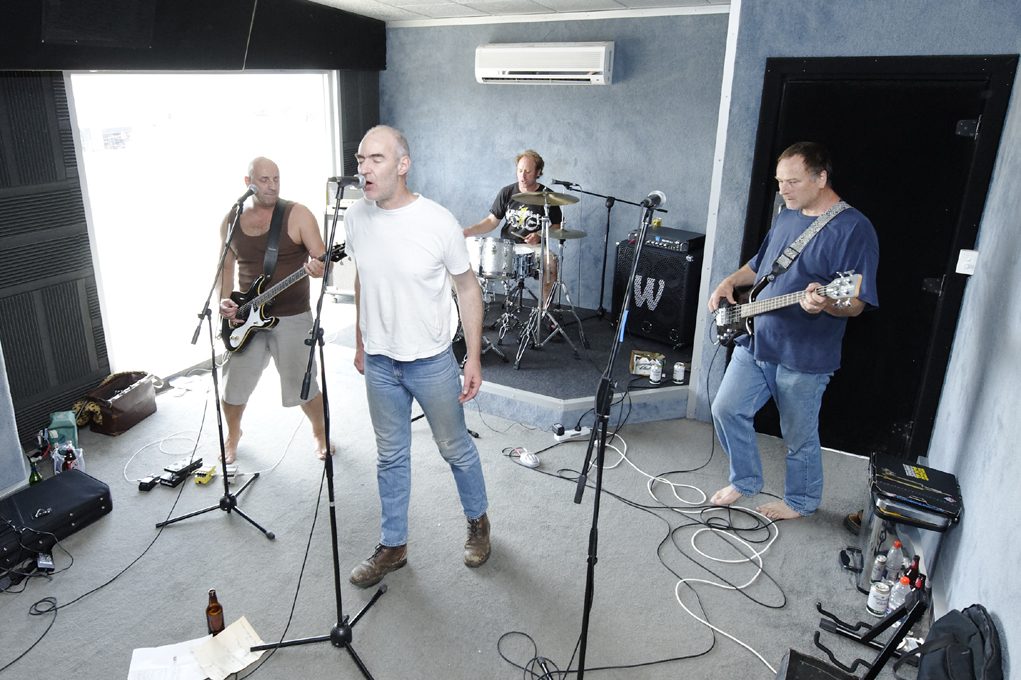
The Seminal Rats 2010

== Discography ==
=== Albums ===
- Omnipotent (1986) – Mr. Spaceman (MRSM 04)/What Goes On (GOESON10)

=== Live albums ===
- Life in the Necropolis (1990) – Mr. Spaceman (MRSM 17)
- Plectrum Muscle (by Cantankerous) (1998) – Rat Race Records (RRR 001)

=== Compilation albums ===
- The Essential Seminal Rats 1984-1991 (August 2007) Bang! Records

=== Extended plays ===
- Hot Snapper Pie (aka Grruntled) (1988) – Mr. Spaceman (MRSM 11)

=== Singles ===
- "Change" — Jesus on T.V./Change (7" Split single with the Celibate Rifles) (What Goes On, 1987)
- "La Grande Bouffe" (Dog Meat, 1991)

=== Appearances ===
- «I Need Somebody» — Hard To Beat (Au Go Go, 1987)
- «Call Me Animal» — Now Suck This Dogface 7" (Destroyer, 1990)
- «Rat Race», «Ain't Dead Yet», «Exhale», «Forest of Fun» — Final Audio Blast (Mr. Spaceman, 1990)
- «Weak» — From Babylon to Brunswick (Nomad, 1991)

== Band members ==
=== Current members ===
- Michael Harley - lead vocals
- Ruebin Pinkster - lead guitar, rhythm guitar
- Dave Balsamo - bass guitar (1984–93, 2002–present)
- Todd McNeair - drums

=== Former members ===
- Michael Weber – lead guitar, rhythm guitar, vocals (1984–99)
- Ian Wettenhall - bass guitar (1993–98)
