= Right-hand man =

== See also ==
- Personal assistant
- Yes man (disambiguation)
