= Underbelly (soundtrack) =

Underbelly (Music from the TV Series)

Soundtrack album by Various Artists
- Released: 29 March 2008
- Genre: Alternative
- Label: Level 2 Music

The soundtrack from the controversial Australian TV series, Underbelly was released on 29 March 2008. It features some of the songs from various artists that played in episodes, and includes elements of the score by Burkhard Dallwitz.

== Track listing ==
=== CD Release ===
As listed at various sources

1. "It's A Jungle Out There" Burkhard Dallwitz
2. "Coca-Cola" Little Red
3. "We Don't Walk" The Paper Scissors
4. "Sticky Fingers" Jamaica Jam
5. "My Pal" GOD
6. "Don't Fight It" The Panics
7. "They Call It Love?....Wow" Evelyn Morris
8. "Sorry" The Easybeats
9. "The Giraffe" Vulgargrad
10. "La Musique" Riot in Belgium
11. "These Are Our Children" I Monster
12. "12 Gates to the City" Suzie Higgie
13. "Molasses in the Moonlight" Jack & Misty
14. "One Night Alone" Winterpark
15. "The Carnival Is Over" Nick Cave & The Bad Seeds
16. "Cyclone on Ceylon" Oleg Kostrow
17. "Mon Cheri (v2)" Klaus Wusthoff
18. "Underbelly Suite" Burkhard Dallwitz

=== Alternative listing ===
The iTunes Store has a slightly different listing.

1. "It's A Jungle Out There" Burkhard Dallwitz
2. "Coca-Cola" Little Red
3. "We Don't Walk" The Paper Scissors
4. "Sticky Fingers" Jamaica Jam
5. "My Pal" GOD
6. "Don't Fight It" The Panics
7. "The Call It Love?....Wow" Evelyn Morris
8. "Sorry" The Easybeats
9. "Wishing Well" Symbiosis
10. "The Giraffe" Vulgargrad
11. "La Musique" Riot in Belgium
12. "These Are Our Children" I Monster
13. "12 Gates to the City" Suzie Higgie
14. "Molasses in the Moonlight" Jack & Misty
15. "One Night Alone" Winterpark
16. "The Carnival is Over" Nick Cave & The Bad Seeds
17. "Cyclone on Ceylon" Oleg Kostrow
18. "Underbelly Suite" Burkhard Dallwitz

== Omitted Tracks ==
These tracks that were not included in this album release but were played in the series:

- "Come on Come On" Little Birdy
- "Shazam!" Spiderbait
- "La Donna E Mobile" Verdi
- "Black Betty" Spiderbait
- "Fucken Awesome" Spiderbait
- "Stop the Sun" The Vacant Lanes
- "I Still Pray" Kasey Chambers & Paul Kelly
- "Tarantula" Pendulum featuring Fresh $Pyda & Tenor Fly
- "The Girl of My Dreams (Is Giving Me Nightmares)" Machine Gun Fellatio
- "Bring It On" Fdel
- "four on the floor" Spiderbait
- "Party Up (Up in Here)" DMX
- "Apple Pie (Skylab Remix)" Coco Electrik
- "Burn It Up" The Cheats
- "Get Up Morning" Eddy Current Suppression Ring
- "Alone With You" (Jenny Morris & Dragon cover) Sunnyboys

== See also ==
- Underbelly (TV series)
