= Black Spiders =

English rock band

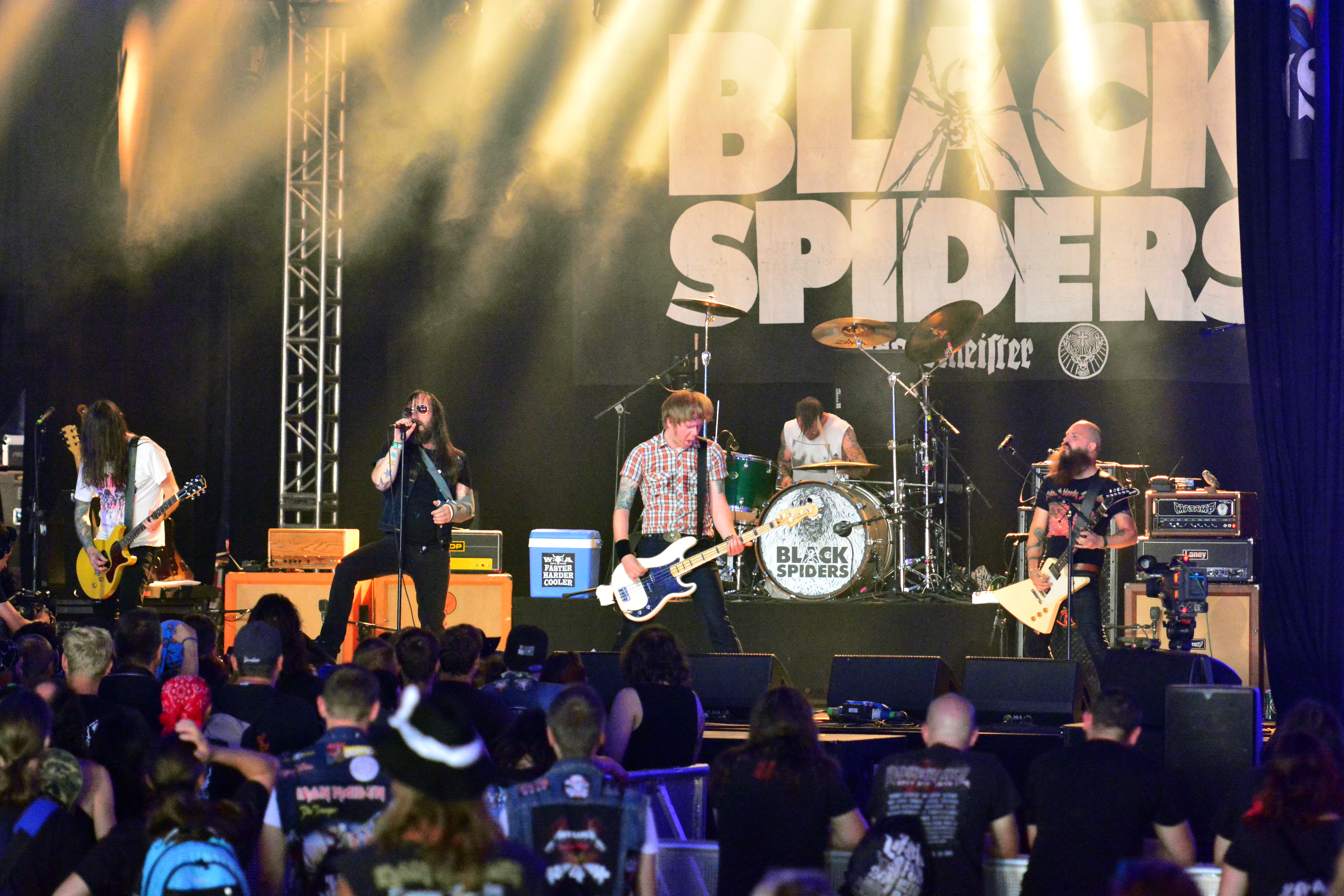
- Black Spiders performing at the Wacken Open Air festival in Germany (2015).

Background information
- Origin: Sheffield, South Yorkshire, U.K.
- Genres: Hard rock, stoner rock
- Years active: 2008–2017; 2020–present
- Labels: Dark Riders, Spinefarm
- Members: Pete Spiby; Adam Irwin; Wyatt Wendels; James Evans; Nate Digby
- Past members: Andrew 'Ozzy' Lister; Mark Thomas; Simon Atkinson
- Website: blackspidersband.com

Black Spiders are an English rock band based in Sheffield, South Yorkshire. Their third studio album entered the UK Independent Albums Chart in early 2021, reaching no. 7.

== History ==
The band formed in early 2008, originally playing a few shows under the name 'The Black Spiders'. They released a three-track single entitled St. Peter in December 2008, to coincide with a small run of dates with Airbourne across mainland Europe in December of the same year - their first ever tour.

A four-track EP, Cinco Hombres, Diez Cojones followed in June 2009, shortly after the band's first appearance at the Download festival at Castle Donington. This was to be the first release on the band’s own record label, Dark Riders.

The band’s second EP, No Goats in the Omen was released in May 2010, to coincide with the band's first headline tour of the UK.

Black Spiders gained early positive reviews in the rock press, with Kerrang! and Classic Rock featuring them on their 'Introducing' and 'High Hopes' sections. Both Rock Sound and Classic Rock also listed them among their 'Ones to Watch'.

After favourable reviews of early shows in the press, the band picked up support slots for numerous other acts. They played UK dates supporting Airbourne and Black Stone Cherry, The Datsuns, Stone Gods and Danko Jones. In September 2009 they supported The Wildhearts on their UK tour and then The Answer in November. A further tour of the UK and Ireland with Airbourne followed, before the band embarked on their own headline tour which consisted of sixteen dates across the UK. In 2009, the band played at Download Festival and at the Hard Rock Hell III festival.

In 2010, the band played at the iTunes Festival with Ozzy Osbourne, after winning a competition held by MySpace and iTunes which had over 500 other entries, to find a suitable unsigned band in the UK. The band also played festivals including Essen Devilside, SOS Festival in Manchester (headlining), Zwarte Cross in the Netherlands, and a show in Victoria Park at the High Voltage Festival, alongside Orange Goblin, ZZ Top, Heaven & Hell and Down. They also played at Sonisphere 2010 at Knebworth on the Bohemia stage, and on the main stage at Bloodstock Open Air in 2010. They were named the 'Best Underground Band' in the Metal Hammer Golden Gods Awards in 2010. At the end of 2010, the band embarked on a huge European tour with Airbourne and after some cancelled dates with Volbeat, the band finished off the year playing the rest of the UK dates with Airbourne.

The band’s debut album, Sons of the North was released on 7 February 2011 to positive reviews in the press, both in the UK and in mainland Europe. Towards the end of February 2011, they embarked on a sold-out headline UK tour with Turbowolf and Viking Skull in support, with a further set of sold-out dates to follow in May 2011, with support from Japanese Voyeurs. In between these tours, Black Spiders were invited to play in China, at the Beijing Stadium in Chaoyung Park, along with other UK acts. The band played six shows over three days, climaxing with their headline appearance on the final day on the main stage.

After their return from Asia, Black Spiders played at various festivals across Europe including the prestigious Rock Am Ring and Rock Im Park festivals in Germany, Graspop Festival in Belgium, and various award shows for Kerrang! and Metal Hammer. The band then played to one of their largest audiences to date in the UK as headliners on the Jägermeister Stage on 9 July at the Sonisphere Festival in Knebworth Park. In the summer of 2011, the band were asked for a second year to play at the High Voltage Festival, this time performing as main support on the Metal Hammer stage to Neurosis on 24 July. This was followed by three dates with Karma to Burn. They then played at the inaugural Steelhouse Festival in Wales on 19 August. At the end of 2011, Black Spiders played UK dates with Volbeat and then ended the year with their longest tour in mainland Europe, with New Jersey Stoner/Space Rockers Monster Magnet.

2012 commenced with Black Spiders writing and recording new material for their second studio album. In April they joined Skindred and Therapy? on the Jäegermeister Tour 2012, with a week-long run of dates in the UK. They then supported veteran Irish rock band Thin Lizzy in May, on the second leg of their 2012 UK tour, and Guns N' Roses on selected dates on their Up Close and Personal Tour.

In 2012, Black Spiders covered "The God That Failed" by Metallica for Kerrang's Black Album Covered compilation. Black Spiders played at Bingley Music Live on Saturday 1 September 2012.

In May 2013, the band announced that their second album would be called This Savage Land, which was scheduled for release in September 2013. The production of this album was funded by fan pledges, via an online music pledging service. An eight-day UK tour was announced to follow at the beginning of October 2013

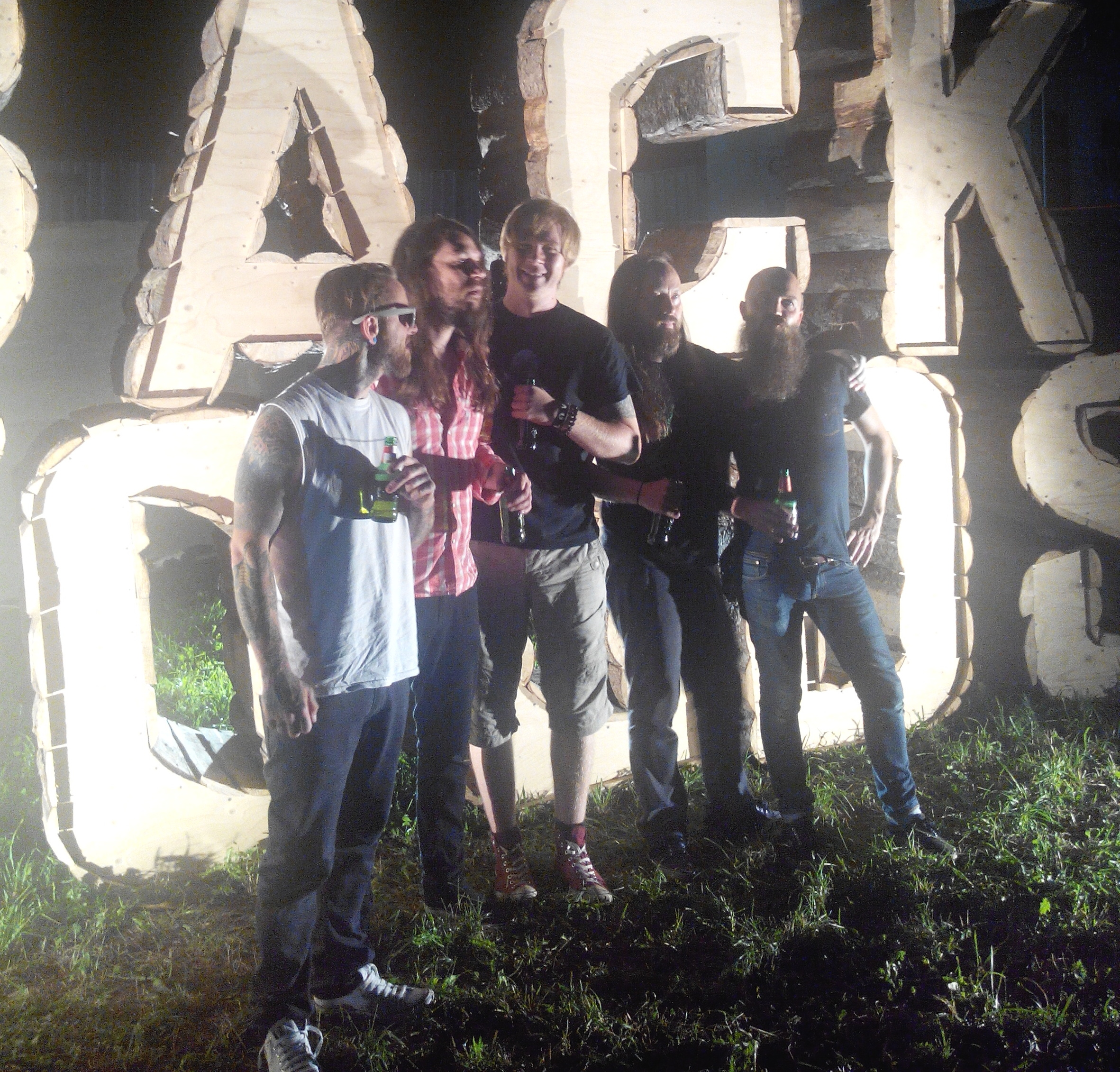
Black Spiders at Backwoods Festival in France (2015).

In 2016, the band announced their breakup with a "F*** Off Black Spiders" eight-day farewell tour in the UK. The last performance was at Sheffield Corporation on 16 June 2017 (rescheduled from 2 May 2017).

In September 2020, the band announced that they had reformed and would be recording new material and playing live again, with new drummer Wyatt Wendels.

In March 2021, after writing a new album throughout the COVID-19 lockdowns, and recording when they were able to do so, the band released a new self-titled album, which received positive reviews.

Unable to follow this up with a tour (due to the pandemic), the band were only able to play a warm-up show and to appear at Bloodstock Festival in August 2021, with an album tour planned for November 2021.

== Musical style ==
Their music is fast paced and energetic, that critics have compared to Black Sabbath, Motörhead, AC/DC, Turbonegro, Led Zeppelin, the Stooges and Aerosmith.

They have cited influneces including AC/DC, ZZ Top, Lynyrd Skynyrd, the Upper Crust, Nashville Pussy, Grady, Rolling Stones, Aerosmith, Van Halen, Guns n' Roses, Journey, Black Sabbath, Queens of the Stone Age, Big Business, Torche, Mastodon, the Sword, Goatsnake, Speedealer, Dead Meadow, Earth, Soundgarden, the Melvins, Tad, Mudhoney, Mark Lanegan, the Jesus Lizard, Butthole Surfers, Big Black, Shellac, Scratch Acid, Unsane, Girls Against Boys, the Stooges, MC5, Spacemen 3, My Bloody Valentine, the Breeders, PJ Harvey, the Afghan Whigs, Royal Trux, Beck, Ween, Mogwai, the Mars Volta, TV on the Radio, the Hives, the Supersuckers, the Cramps, the Onyas, Dwarves, Sonny Boy Williamson I, Bessie Smith, Blind Willie Johnson, New Bomb Turks, the Jon Spencer Blues Explosion, Black Flag, the Dead Kennedys, Turbonegro, Zeke, Johnny Cash, the Young Gods, Revolting Cocks, Public Enemy and GG Allin.

== Discography ==
=== Studio albums ===
- Sons of the North (2011) UK Albums Chart peak: No. 172
- This Savage Land (2013) UK Albums Chart peak: No. 59
- Black Spiders (2021) UK Independent Albums Chart peak: No. 7; UK Rock & Metal Albums Chart peak: No. 4
- Can't Die, Won't Die (2023) UK Rock & Metal Albums Chart peak: No. 11
- Cvrses (2025) UK Independent Albums Chart peak: No. 41

=== Compilations ===
- Volume (2011) – compilation of the band's first single and first two EPs

=== EPs ===
- Cinco Hombres, Diez Cojones (2009)
- No Goats in the Omen (2010)
- Rat Mansion (2014)
- Deaf Proof (2021)

=== Singles ===
- "St. Peter" (2008)
- "Stay Down" (2009)
- "Just Like a Woman" (2010)
- "Kiss Tried to Kill Me" (2012) – UK Official Physical Singles Chart: No. 10
- "Creatures" (2012)
- "Balls" (2013)
- "Teenage Knife Gang" (2013)
- "Stick It to the Man" (2014)
- "Fly in the Soup" (2020)
- "Good Times" (2021)
- "Give Em What They Want" (2021)
- "Hot Wheels" (2023)
- "Alright Alright Alright" (2023)
- "Destroyer" (2023)
- "Never Enough" (2025)
