= The Onyas =

Australian musical group

- Origin: Brisbane, Queensland, Australia
- Genres: Punk rock
- Works: Discography
- Years active: 1991-present
- Labels: Au-Go-Go; Man's Ruin; Lance Rock; Junk; Sheep; 1+2
- Spinoffs: Cosmic Psychos
- Members: John McKeering; Richard Stanley; Jordan Stanley
- Past members: Anton Bladwell; José Bernardo "Joseber" Tolosa

The Onyas are an Australian punk rock band that formed in 1991 in Brisbane. The members are John "Mad Macka" McKeering (vocals, guitar) and the brothers Richard "Stanners" Stanley (bass guitar) and Jordan "Jaws" Stanley (drums). They have undertaken five international tours, three to Europe (1996, 1997 and 1998) and two to the United States (1997 and 2000). They issued two studio albums, Get Shitfaced with the Onyas (1996) and Six! (1998).

== History ==
The Onyas were formed in April 1991 in the Brisbane suburbs of Boondall and Fig Tree Pocket, Queensland. Founding members were John "Mad Macka" McKeering on lead vocals and guitar and the brothers Richard "Stanners" Stanley on bass guitar and Jordan "Jaws" Stanley on drums. McKeering had met Richard in 1989 when they were swapping music tapes. Richard and "Jaws" grew up in Brisbane's western suburbs, where they "hung out at Indooroopilly Shoppingtown and went skating at the Jindalee bowl". Both were heavily influenced at a young age by the American group Kiss.

The Onyas' first performance was at the 1991 Queensland Rock Awards. The group released a seven-track extended play, Brack, in 1991 on cassette tape with McKeering on guitar and vocals, Richard on bass (vocals on one track) and "Jaws" on drums and Stuart Price on vocals (on another track). Their next EP was a split album with three tracks each by themselves and Big Bongin' Baby, which appeared in December 1993. After three years of performing at local venues they were signed by Bruce Milne of Melbourne-based Au Go Go Records. The label issued their single "Beer Gut" in 1994. The group undertook their first tour of Europe in early 1996 with Melbourne punk rockers Cosmic Psychos. On 19 October 1996 the Queenslanders supported the Sex Pistols on their Filthy Lucre Tour, at the Festival Hall, Melbourne.

The Onyas' debut album, Get Shitfaced with the Onyas, was issued by Au Go Go Records in February 1997. Vicious Kitten Magazine's Denis Gray felt "[it] is the most punishing slab of punk you'll hear all year." The Barman of i94-Bar reviewed its 2006 re-issue and found that they were a band "Desperate to be heard, a band desperate not to be stuck in the relatively small pond of Brisbane's often strangulated scene any longer." In 1999 the group relocated to Melbourne where they established a warehouse as their base. In July 1999 Richard founded Dropkick Records with Bruce Milne and his brother James, which issued the group's compilation album, Heterospective (April 2000).

By 2000, the Onyas had undertaken five international tours with three to Europe (1996, 1997 and 1998) and two to the United States (1997 and 2000). Australian musicologist Ian McFarlane observed "[they] played fast, stupid, 'couldn't-give-a-shit' punk rock... [and] issued three albums of rough-hewn punk rock". "Jaws" joined the Casanovas in January 2004 replacing Patrick Boyce on drums. In 2006 McKeering also joined Cosmic Psychos on guitar, after the death of that group's Robert John "Rocket" Watts. Richard formed Ooga Boogas with Leon Stackpole (The Sailors), Per Byström (Cloudberry Jam) and Mikey Young (Eddy Current Suppression Ring), and started Aarght Records with all members of that band. Thereafter the Onyas seldom performed: "roughly once per year". Richard reflected, in 2012, "we all went off and joined or started other bands... The Onyas is a distant embarrassment for all of us." In 2016 the Onyas celebrated their 25th anniversary with a concert on 1 April at The Tote, Melbourne.

== Members ==
Current members

- John "Mad Macka" McKeering – vocals, guitar, drums
- Richard "Stanners" Stanley – bass guitar, guitar, vocals
- Jordan Stanley (p.k.a. "Jaws") – drums (1991–1998)

Previous members

- Stuart – vocals (1991)
- Anton Bladwell – guitar (1992), backing vocals (1998)
- Randy Longbar – guitar (1992–1994)
- José Bernardo "Joseber" Tolosa – guitar (1997)
- Joey Hellhound – drums (1998)

== Discography ==
=== Albums ===
- Get Shitfaced with the Onyas (1996) – Every Band in Brisbane Sucks Including Yours/Au-Go-Go Records (ANDA 196CD)
- Six! (August 1998) – Au-Go-Go Records

=== Compilation albums ===
- Heterospective (April 2000) – Dropkick Records (BEHIND 003)

=== Extended plays ===
- Brack (1991) – Mick at Uibrafeel
- Live for Rejection (1997) – Man's Ruin Records (MR-030)

==== Split extended plays ====
- [untitled] (by The Onyas / Big Bongin' Baby) (December 1993) – Destroyer (009)
- Pissin' & Peckin' with the Onyas (by The Onyas / the Rockford Files) (1995) – Knuckledrag (URK01)

=== Singles ===
- "Beer Gut" (1994) – Au-Go-Go
- "Live for Rejection" (1994) – Lance Rock (Canadian label)
- "London... Paris... Bracken Ridge!" (1997) – 1 + 2
- "Hit You up the Guts" (1996) – Munster Records (Spanish label)
- "Drink 'Em up Motherfuckers!" (1998) – Sheep
- "Three More Hits from the Onyas" (1999) – Junk
- "Admission of a Lifestyle" (2000) – Dropkick
