= Hoss (band) =

Australian hard rock band

- Origin: Melbourne, Victoria, Australia
- Genre: Hard rock
- Years active: 1990- present
- Labels: Au Go Go; Dog Meat; Mongrel/Shock
- Members: Joel Silbersher Scott Bailey Jimmy Sfetsos Cris Wilson
- Past members: Scott Bailey; Todd McNeair; Joel Silbersher; Michael Weber; Michael Glenn; Dean Muller; Jimmy Sfetsos; Adam Cole

Hoss are an Australian hard rock band which formed in 1990 by Joel Silbersher on guitar and lead vocals (ex-God), Scott Bailey on bass guitar, Todd McNeair on drums (ex-Seminal Rats), and Michael Weber on lead guitar (ex-Seminal Rats, Slush Puppies). They released five albums, Guzzle (1990), You Get Nothing (April 1992), Bring on the Juice (August 1993), Everyday Lies (November 1995) and Do You Leave Here Often (February 1998). In 1992 McNeair was replaced by Michael Glenn on drums, who was replaced in turn in 1995 by Dean Muller. Michael Weber, who had been replaced in 1992 by Jimmy Sfetsos on guitar.

== History ==
Hoss were formed in 1990 in Melbourne as a hard rock band with the line-up of Scott Bailey on bass guitar, Todd McNeair on drums (ex-Seminal Rats), Joel Silbersher on guitar and lead vocals (ex-God) and Michael Weber on lead guitar (ex-Seminal Rats, Slush Puppies). Their name was chosen "because Joel likes monosyllabic names." They signed with Au Go Go Records, which issued their debut single, "Green", and their first album, Guzzle. Australian musicologist, Ian McFarlane, described it as "a rushed affair (recorded in one session, the day before the band played its debut gig), and consequently lacked appealing ideas." Silbersher told Steven Corby of The Canberra Times that their sound was "stripped down, raucous rock 'n'roll."

You Get Nothing, their second album was released in April 1992, for which McFarlane felt, "The band was at its best [as they] mixed Detroit rock action with Exile on Main Street-era Rolling Stones raunch." By that time they were one of a string of 1990s hard rock bands on Melbourne's Dog Meat Records, alongside label mates, Powder Monkeys and Splatterheads. Just before the album's appearance McNeair and Weber had returned to Seminal Rats; they were replaced in Hoss by Michael "Captain Kaos" Glenn (ex-Joysticks, Forbidden Planet) and Jimmy Sfetsos (ex-Nice Girls from Cincinnati), respectively.

For their third album, Bring on the Juice (August 1993), the group used Charlie Owen (of Beasts of Bourbon) on lap slide guitar and dobro for a track, "Lip from Lip". Silbersher was the main songwriter for the group, he also released a solo album, Melonman (1994) and has collaborated with Owen as the Tendrils to issue their self-titled album (June 1995). He has toured as a backing musician with other acts, including Tex Perkins and with Dirty Three.

In March 1994 Hoss issued an extended play, Gentle Claws, which was followed by their fourth album, Everyday Lies, in November 1995. Joachim Hiller of German magazine, Ox-Fanzine felt that Silbersher "muß in seinem jungen Leben schon verdammt viel Leid erlebt haben, denn sonst könnte er nicht mit so heiserer Bluesstimme seinen Schmerz herausbrüllen." (translation: "must have had a lot of suffering in his young life, otherwise he would not be able to rouse his pain with such hoarse blues.") During 1995 Glenn was replaced on drums by Dean Muller (ex-Voodoo Lust, Macho Clowns).

On their early albums, Hoss were influenced by 1970s garage and boogie hard rock such as Aerosmith, Blue Öyster Cult and The Stooges. However, by their fifth album, Do You Leave Here Often? (February 1998), they had developed a more complex sound, which continued to exhibit hard rock influences but also used more sophisticated arrangements reminiscent of bands such as the Afghan Whigs. McFarlane opined that they had "earned a solid reputation by consistently living up to audience expectations with well-honed songs and uncompromising gigs. By taking inspiration from the likes of The Rolling Stones, Kiss, The Stooges, AC/DC and Black Sabbath, Hoss came up with a near-perfect blend of melodic power chords, hyper-kinetic guitar riffs and hard driving rock beats."

Hoss performed at the Meredith Music Festival in December 2010, they were described on the festival website as "Powerful, tough, natural-sounding rock’n'roll with a brain as well as a rump. They don’t make videos, they don’t play very often (took them 15 years to go to Perth), they don’t compromise, and as far as I can tell they don’t care; they ain’t careerist." They had previously played at the festival in 1992, 1993 and 1996.

== Band members ==
- Scott Bailey – bass guitar (1990–current)
- Todd McNeair – drums (1990–92)
- Cris Wilson (2024-current)
- Joel Silbersher – vocals, guitars, keyboards, producer (1990–current)
- Michael Weber – guitar (1990–92)
- Michael Glenn – drums (1992–95)
- Dean Muller - drums, vocals (1995–2021)
- Jimmy Sfetsos – guitars (1992–current)
- Cris Wilson – drums, vocals (1995–current)
- Adam Cole – guitar

== Discography ==
=== Album ===
- Guzzle (1990) – Au Go Go Records (ANDA119)
- You Get Nothing (1992) – Dog Meat Records (DOG034)
- Bring on the Juice (August 1993) – Dog Meat Records (DOG051)
- Everyday Lies (November 1995) – Dog Meat Records (DOG069)
- Do You Leave Here Often? (February 1998) – Mongrel Records/Shock Records (Mong 01)

=== Extended plays ===
- Cave Me In (1992) – Dog Meat Records (DOG049)
- Gentle Claws (March 1994) – Dog Meat Records (DOG060)

=== Singles ===
- "Green" (1990) – Au Go Go Records (ANDA118)
- "It's Everywhere" (1991) – Dog Meat Records (DOG033)
- "The Tiredest Man Awake" (1993) – Death Valley Records (DV-005)
- "The Goddess Has Time" (1998) – Wigwam Records (WW1)
