= Yes man =

A Yes man is a sycophant; an obsequious assistant or enabler.

Yes Man or Yes Men may refer to:

== Books ==
- Yes Man (book), a semi-autobiographical novel by Danny Wallace; basis for the 2008 film

== Film ==
- Yes Man (film), a 2008 American comedy starring Jim Carrey
- The Yes Man, a 1991 Italian drama film
- The Yes Men (film), a 2003 documentary about the culture-jamming duo

== Television ==
- "Yes Men" (Agents of S.H.I.E.L.D.)
- "Yes-Man", a season 2 episode of The Loud House

== Characters ==
- Yes Man (Kappa Mikey), a fictional character in the animated TV series Kappa Mikey
- Yes Guy, a fictional character in the animated TV series The Simpsons
- Yes Man, a sycophantic robot who appears in Fallout: New Vegas, and is voiced by Dave Foley

== Music ==
- "Yes Man", theme Song - Yes Man soundtrack by Zooey Deschanel and Munchausen by Proxy
- "Yes Man" (song), a 2010 song by Bjørn Johan Muri
- "Yes Man" (Ben Folds song)
- The Yes-Men, an Australian high energy rock band

== Other ==
- The Yes Men, a culture-jamming activist duo

== See also ==
- Frank Nelson (actor), known for his "EEE-Yeeeeeeeeesssss?" catch-phrase
