= Michael Weber =

Australian guitarist

Mick Weber
- Weber performing with Seminal Rats, 1998

Background information
- Born: Michael Peter Weber; 17 March 1966; Melbourne, Victoria, Australia
- Died: 2 January 1999 (aged 32)
- Genres: Hard rock
- Occupation: Musician
- Instrument: Guitar
- Years active: 1984–1999
- Formerly of: Skippy; Seminal Rats; Slush Puppies; Hoss

Michael Peter Weber (17 March 1966 – 2 January 1999) was the lead guitarist of Australian punk rockers Seminal Rats, from 1984 to 1988. Weber also worked as a technician at the Maton guitar facility. He was a member of punky power poppers Slush Puppies (1988), before joining hard rock band Hoss, between 1990 and 1992. He returned to Seminal Rats from 1992 until his death from an accidental heroin overdose, aged 32.

== Biography ==
Michael Weber formed a student band, Skippy, while at secondary school with Todd McNeair and Reuben Pinkster. Weber was the founding lead guitarist of Seminal Rats, a punk rock group formed in Melbourne in 1984 by Weber on guitar, Dave Balsamo on bass guitar, Mick Harley on lead vocals, McNeair on drums and Pinkster on guitar.

During 1988, with McNeair joined punky power pop group, Slush Puppies.

Weber in 1989

In 1990 Weber and McNeair founded hard rock band, Hoss.

== Discography ==
=== Studio albums ===
with Seminal Rats

- Omnipotent (1986) Mr Spaceman (MRSM 04)
- Life in the Necropolis 1990 Mr Spaceman (MRSM 17)
- Plectrum Muscle 1998 independent (0000)

with Hoss

- Guzzle (1990) Au Go Go Records (ANDA 119)
- You Get Nothing (April 1992) Dog Meat (DOG 034)

=== Compilation albums ===
with Seminal Rats

- The Essential Seminal Rats 1984-1991 (August 2007) Bang Records (BANG!-CD11)

=== Extended plays ===
with Seminal Rats

- Grruntled a.k.a. Hot Snapper Pie (1986) Mr Spaceman (MRSM 11)

=== Singles ===
with Seminal Rats

- "Change" on "Jesus on T.V."/"Change" (split single by Celibate Rifles/Seminal Rats) (1987) What Goes on Records (PROGO 1)
- "Call Me Animal" 1990
- "La Grande Bouffe" 1991

with Slush Puppies

- "You're so Perfect" (December 1988)

with Hoss

- "Green" (1990) Au Go Go Records (ANDA 118)
- "It's Everywhere" (February 1992) Dog Meat (DOG 033)

=== Other appearances ===
with Seminal Rats

- "I Need Somebody" on Hard to Beat 1987
- Final Audio Blast 1990
- "Weak" on From Babylon to Brunswick 1991
