= Sons of the North =

Studio album by Black Spiders
- Released: 7 February 2011
- Recorded: 2010
- Genre: Stoner rock
- Length: 43:39
- Label: Dark Riders
- Producer: Matt Elliss and Black Spiders

Black Spiders chronology
No Goats in the Omen (2010)	Sons of the North (2011)	This Savage Land (2013)

Professional ratings
Review scores
Source	Rating
About.com	3.5/5 stars
BBC Music	(favorable)
Classic Rock	7/10 stars

Sons of the North is the debut album by English rock band Black Spiders. It was released 7 February 2011 after two years of touring by the band.

== Track listing ==
All songs written by Pete Spiby, Ozzy Lister, Mark Thomas, Si Atkinson and Adam Irwin.

1. "Stay Down" – 3:03
2. "KISS Tried to Kill Me" – 4:26
3. "Just Like a Woman" – 3:40
4. "Easy Peasy" – 3:23
5. "Blood of the Kings" – 7:37
6. "St. Peter" – 5:11
7. "Man's Ruin" – 4:00
8. "Medusa's Eyes" – 3:53
9. "Si, El Diablo" – 3:59
10. "What Good's a Rock Without a Roll?" – 4:29
11. "Sons of the North (bonus track, iTunes) – 4:22

== Personnel ==
=== Black Spiders ===
- Pete 'Spider' Spiby – lead vocals, rhythm guitar
- Ozzy 'Owl' Lister – lead guitar, backing vocals
- Mark 'The Dark Shark' Thomas – lead guitar, backing vocals
- Adam 'The Fox' Irwin – bass guitar, backing vocals
- Si 'Tiger' Atkinson – drums, percussion

=== Additional musicians ===
- Danni Maibaum – additional female vocals on "Easy Peasy"
