= Mountain of Piss =

Studio album by Cosmic Psychos
- Released: 9 July 2021
- Recorded: October 2019 – 2020
- Studios: Knighty's Shed, Spring Plains, Mia Mia, Australia
- Genre: Punk rock
- Length: 35:50
- Label: Go the Hack

Cosmic Psychos chronology
Loudmouth Soup (2018)	Mountain of Piss (2021)

Mountain of Piss is the 11th studio album by Australian punk rock band Cosmic Psychos, released on 9 July 2021 through Go the Hack Records. The album peaked at No. 19 on the Australian charts, their highest ranking.

== Recording ==
This album was recorded in the shed on lead singer Knight's property in Mia Mia, Victoria. Mostly recorded in October 2019, there was some further work done in 2020.

The album release was delayed due to the COVID-19 pandemic. Knight said, "Instead of releasing the album, I had two hip replacements. I'm told they are titanium, but being the public health system, they may be made from balsa wood for all I know."

== Reception ==
The Canberra Times said, "It's another collection of crunching grunge guitar over Ross Knight's gravelly, yet witty, roar about everything from stupid sports stars ("Sin Bin"), dodgy accountants, and a humorous lament about the changing nature of Australian society ("Too Old To Drink In Pubs"). The best moments arrive when the Psychos turn up the distortion and jam." Loud agreed, "Bare bones brute force, unrestrained and loud: the raucous simplicity of the Psychos' brand of punk rock never wavers, even as they take slight artistic variations."

Wall of Sound stated, "One thing that I don't like in this world is when your favourite band become a bunch of old, fat blokes, completely out of touch, and trying to relive past glories but are nowhere near up to the task. Then you have the Cosmic Psychos."

The Courier-Mail noted, "they’ve lost none of that yobbo sensibility. Drinking and toilet songs lower the tone."

== Track listing ==
1. "Accountant Song" – 3:53
2. "Beep" – 2:22
3. "Bleeding Knuckles" – 3:18
4. "Dickson" – 2:31
5. "Dunny Seat" – 3:48
6. "Mountain of Piss" – 3:46
7. "Munted" – 3:56
8. "Rude Man" – 2:55
9. "Sin Bin" – 2:51
10. "Too Old to Drink in Pubs" – 4:01
11. "Unreal" – 2:29
12. "Dumb" (digital bonus track) – 4:12

== Personnel ==
- Ross Knight – lead vocals, bass guitar
- John McKeering – guitar, backing vocals, lead vocals on "Dickson"
- Dean Muller – drums, backing vocals

== Charts ==
Chart performance for Mountain of Piss
Chart (2021)	Peak position
Australian Albums (ARIA)	19
