= Tendrils (band) =

- Also known as: Joel Silbersher and Charlie Owen
- Origin: Melbourne, Victoria, Australia
- Years active: 1995–1999, 2011
- Labels: Dead Meat, Half a Cow
- Past members: Charlie Owen; Joel Silbersher

Tendrils was an irregular collaboration between two Australian guitarists, Joel Silbersher of Hoss and Charlie Owen of Beasts of Bourbon. Tendrils' music was characterized by two chaotic yet complementary guitar parts and occasional stripped-back percussion. In 1995, billed simply as "Joel Silbersher and Charlie Owen", they issued an album, Tendrils. It was produced by Spencer P. Jones was recorded at Atlantis Studios, Melbourne. Drums were provided by Greg Bainbridge on three tracks and Todd McNeair on one track.

For the second album, Soaking Red (1998), they used Tendrils as the band's name. Owen played guitars, pedal bass, piano, organ, percussion, mandolin, banjo, bass recorder, backing vocals on one track, and drums on another; Silbersher supplied vocals, guitars, drums, harmonica, and incidental keyboards; Jim White provided additional drumming on one track. It was produced by Dave McLuney, Owen, and Silbersher and mixed at Atlantis studios. Soaking Red was nominated at the ARIA Music Awards of 1999, for Best Alternative Release. In April 1999 they advertised an intention to tour overseas. In November 2011, Tendrils supported a gig by Gareth Liddiard.

== Discography ==
List of Albums
Title	Details
Tendrils (credited to Charlie Owen & Joel Silbersher)	Released: 1995; Label: Dog Meat (DOG065CD); Formats: CD
Soaking Red	Released: September 1998; Label: Half a Cow Records (HAC 71); Formats: CD

== Awards and nominations ==
=== ARIA Music Awards ===
The ARIA Music Awards is an annual awards ceremony that recognises excellence, innovation, and achievement across all genres of Australian music. They commenced in 1987.

Year	Nominee / work	Award	Result	Ref.
1999	Soaking Red	Best Adult Alternative Album	Nominated	
