= Splatterheads =

Australian punk rock band

- Also known as: Lompoc County Splatterheads
- Origin: Sydney, Australia
- Genres: Punk rock
- Years active: 1987–1996, 2010–2012
- Labels: Waterfront; Dog Meat/Shock; Subway
- Past members: Adrian Carroll; Simon "Sly" Faulkner (a.k.a. Sly T-Bone); Christo Fletcher (a.k.a. Big Guy); Micky Scott; Peter "PT" Thompson; Marty "Bungle" Herbert; Matt Olive

Splatterheads were an Australian punk rock band, which formed in 1987. They issued three albums, Ink of a Mad Man's Pen (1989), Bot, the Album (1993) and Joined at the Head (1996), before disbanding in 1996. They re-united in 2010 to perform and released a compilation album, Splatter Platter.

== History ==
Splatterheads were formed in 1987 as a punk rock band, Lompoc County Splatterheads, by Adrian Carroll on guitar, Simon "Sly" Faulkner (a.k.a. Sly T-Bone) on guitar and vocals, Christo Fletcher (a.k.a. Big Guy) on vocals and guitar, Micky Scott on drums and Peter "PT" Thompson on bass guitar. Fletcher, Scott and Thompson shared a house together in Surry Hills when they decided to start a band. They soon recruited Carroll and Faulkner. "Lompoc County" references Lompoc, California and its appearances in American cartoon TV series Roger Ramjet, where the title character describes "local louts as a bunch of 'Splatter heads'." They released a seven-track mini-album, The Filthy Mile, in 1988. When Carroll left, they shortened their name to Splatterheads.

The group's debut album, Ink of a Mad Man's Pen (October 1989), appeared on Waterfront, which was produced and engineered by former member, Carroll. Australian musicologist Ian McFarlane described their "rough-hewn, low-fi" work, which "presented some frantic moments, but failed to capture the band's live firepower." It provided a single, "Destroyer", with its "free-jazz explorations" reminiscent of Fun House-era the Stooges. The quartet issued their cover version of the Undertones' "Teenage Kicks" (1992). They toured to Melbourne supporting fellow punk band, Bored and became that group's label mates when they were signed with Dog Meat.

Splatterheads recorded their next album, Bot, the Album (August 1993), with co-producers John Nolan (of Bored) and Joel Silbersher. Before it appeared Scott was replaced on drums by Marty "Bungle" Herbert. McFarlane found it, "closer to being a truer representation of their overall sound." From February 1995 the four-piece undertook a European tour supporting American bands NOFX, Lagwagon, Weezer and Big Chief. During that tour they recorded their performances for a live album, Joined at the Head (August 1996), which was issued via German-based label, Subway. Upon return to Australia, Faulkner relocated to Melbourne and Splatterheads disbanded.

Splatterheads reformed in 2010 and appeared at Sydney Fringe Festival. They released a compilation of 1990s live performances, Splatter Platter (2010). The line-up of Faulkner, Fletcher and Herbert were joined by Matt Oliver on bass guitar and performed in September 2012.

== Members ==
- Adrian Carroll – guitar
- Simon "Sly" Faulkner (a.k.a. Sly T-Bone) – guitar, vocals
- Christo Fletcher (a.k.a. Big Guy) – vocals, guitar
- Micky Scott – drums
- Peter "PT" Thompson – bass guitar
- Marty "Bungle" Herbert – drums
- Matt Oliver – bass guitar

== Discography ==
=== Albums ===
- Ink of a Mad Man's Pen (October 1989) Waterfront – (DAMP 120)
- Bot, the Album (August 1993) – Dog Meat (DOG 054)
- Joined at the Head (1996) – Subway (7192218 WM 331)

=== Compilation albums ===
- Splatterheads (1992) – Dog Meat (DOG 039 CD)
- Splatter Platter (2010)

=== Extended plays ===
- The Filthy Mile (1988) – Splatter Rock (SR01)

=== Singles ===
- "Destroyer" (1990)
- "Teenage Kicks" (1992)
