= Roadrunner (Australian music magazine) =

Former Australian music magazine (1978–1983)

- Editor: Donald Robertson
- Editor: Stuart Coupe
- Editor: Allan Coop
- Editor: Alex Ehlert
- Editor: Bruce Milne
- Staff writers: Giles Barrow
- Photographer: Eric Algra
- Categories: Australian music magazine
- Frequency: Monthly
- Format: Tabloid
- Publisher: Donald Robertson
- Founder: Stuart Coupe and Donald Robertson
- Founded: 1978
- First issue: March 1978
- Final issue Number: January 1983; 48
- Country: Australia
- Based in: Adelaide
- Website: roadrunnertwice.com.au

Roadrunner was a monthly Australian music magazine based in Adelaide, South Australia. The magazine was founded by Donald Robertson and Stuart Coupe, and initially run by a co-operative, with Robertson ending up as sole editor and publisher. There were 48 issues published between March 1978 and January 1983. All issues were made available online in 2017, and a limited hardback anthology version was published in October 2019. In 2020 Robertson started publishing a blog called Roadrunnertwice, which included some previously published articles as well as new material.

== History ==
The magazine was inspired by the punk rock/new wave movement of the mid-1970s and took its name from the Jonathan Richman song "Roadrunner". Its inaugural issue was published in March 1978.

In its first year (1978) Roadrunner was produced by an editorial collective that included Coupe, Robertson, Allan Coop, Alex Ehlert, Bruce Milne, and Clinton Walker and was only distributed in South Australia. After Coupe left after five issues to write for Rock Australia Magazine in Sydney, Robertson became editor and publisher and secured national distribution from issue 10 (February 1979), which featured a cover story about the Elvis Costello tour of Australia.

Issue 23 (February 1980) of the magazine forms part of the Festival Records collection at Sydney's Powerhouse Museum as an example of how rock music magazines helped to promote overseas recording artists.

The magazine hit financial difficulties in mid-1982 and relocated to Sydney for a final issue, which was published in January 1983. The final issue saw a change to a full colour, glossy format that anticipated the emergence of Countdown Magazine (1982–87) and the Australian version of the British magazine Smash Hits.

Robertson later wrote: "Roadrunner survived for five years due to the combination of a posse of enthusiastic (and usually unpaid) contributors, a creative and understanding production crew, a sympathetic printer, the support of key music industry personalities and—perhaps most important of all—a small but dedicated readership".

Notable contributors included: Keith Shadwick, Stuart Matchett, Ross Stapleton, Scott Matheson, Peter Nelson, Adrian Ryan, Keri Phillips, Craig N. Pearce, Larry Buttrose, Chris Willis, Toby Creswell, Mark Mordue, Richard McGregor, Richard Guilliat, David Langsam, Jillian Burt, Dennis Atkins, and Elly McDonald.

== Assessment and impact ==
In the first edition of the Australian Music Directory (1981–82), Miranda Brown commented that Roadrunner offered its readers "the vitality that established papers often lack... though its coverage of the English scene is extensive, most of the copy is written by Australians abroad or here. Roadrunner articles tend to be rough-edged and experimental, with a minimum of editorial intervention... the magazine was the first to treat Australian music as a force with its own history, geography and ideologies, although the other major rock papers quickly followed suit".

In Dig—Australian Rock and Pop Music 1960–85 David Nichols wrote "Adelaide's Roadrunner was without doubt a quality publication. Edited and published by Donald Robertson—the survivor from its founding co-operative—the paper attracted a number of important and interesting writers from around the country who recognised it as a valuable forum. Roadrunner, whose cover price was similar to the imported magazines such as NME and Melody Maker, exhibited considerable bravery. It had no qualms about running a five-page exploration of (Mushroom Records') Michael Gudinski's business interests. It also gave invaluable early coverage to new Aboriginal groups such as No Fixed Address, even before they made the classic film Wrong Side of the Road – indeed it put them on its cover. (Note: For more on this, see No Fixed Address: young, black and proud.) That all this was achieved from Australia's smallest mainland state capital is testament to the talent and dedication of Robertson and his writers".

== Re-publications ==
In May 2017, the University of Wollongong in New South Wales made all 48 issues of Roadrunner available in a digital archive. To accompany this release, publisher Donald Robertson published a brief history of the magazine.

In October 2019, Roadrunnertwice published The Big Beat: rock music in Australia 1978-1983, through the pages of Roadrunner magazine, a 544-page anthology of the magazine in a limited hardcover edition of 500 copies.

In 2020, Robertson published a blog called Roadrunnertwice, containing "a selection of previous published articles and new stuff as it comes to me".
