= Different Like You =

Studio album by Rocket Science
- Released: 2008
- Recorded: 2007
- Studio: Secret Location Studio
- Genre: Garage rock
- Label: High Spot Records
- Producer: Paul Maybury

Rocket Science chronology
Eternal Holiday (2004)	Different Like You (2008)	Snake (2019)

Different Like You is the fourth full-length album by Australian garage rock band Rocket Science. It was engineered and produced by guitarist Paul Maybury and recorded at Maybury's newly established studio, Secret Location Studios. Following their departure from the Modular Recordings label, the album was released on new Australian label, High Spot Recordings, on 26 July 2008.

An Australian tour in May 2008 revolved around the release of the first single "Psychic Man".

== Critical reception ==
Luke McGrath from BMA Magazine felt it was "not so much a progression as a refinement – Different Like You is as loud, as brash and as concentrated a dose of Rocket Science as any fan could want." Shane Arnold from Music Feeds described its "raw high energy songs infused with theremin and rock & roll" and the group as "easily one of the best (and craziest) live acts going around currently and any albums like this are only going to enhance their reputation."

== Track listing ==
1. "Sinful Cowboy" – 3:24 (Tucker/Warhurst/Rocket Science)
2. "Psychic Man" – 4:04 (Gray/Warhurst/Rocket Science)
3. "With You I'll Be Someone" – 2:52 (Tucker/Warhurst/Rocket Science)
4. "Different Like Everybody Else" – 3:00 (Blampied/Tucker/Rocket Science)
5. "Weekly Dreams" – 3:17 (Tucker/Warhurst/Rocket Science)
6. "Jukebox Junkie" – 2:34 (Gray/Tucker/Rocket Science)
7. "Talking To Machines" – 3:13 (Tucker/Warhurst/Rocket Science)
8. "The Clones" – 4:12 (Tucker/Warhurst/Rocket Science)
9. "Love Love Love" – 2:21 (Warhurst/Rocket Science)
10. "Alive" – 3:27 (Tucker/Warhurst/Rocket Science)

== Personnel ==
- Dave Gray – bass
- Paul Maybury – guitar
- Roman Tucker – keyboards, theremin, vocals
- Kit Warhurst – drums, vocals
