= Guttersnipe =

Guttersnipe or Guttersnipes may refer to:

- Guttersnipe, a 1998 extended play by Beanbag
- Guttersnipe, a 2007 song by Besieged
- The Guttersnipe, a 1922 American romance film
- Guttersnipes (band), Australian punk and pop band
- Guttersnipes (film), 1944 Swedish film

== See also ==
- Gutter Snypes
