= Guttersnipes (band) =

Australian rock band

- Origin: Melbourne, Victoria, Australia
- Genres: Punk; pop
- Years active: 1990–2001
- Label: Au-Go-Go
- Past members: Paul Brockhoff; Ian MacKaye; Michael McManus; Andrew Rice; Mark Hurst
- Website: guttersnipes.bandcamp.com

Guttersnipes were an Australian punk and pop band, which formed in 1990 by Paul "Brocky" Brockhoff on guitar and vocals, Ian MacKaye on drums, Michael "Macca" McManus on bass guitar and Andrew "Ricey" Rice on guitar and vocals. Soon after MacKaye was replaced by Mark "Hursty" Hurst on drums. They issued an eight-track album, Blurred, in November 1991 (expanded with three bonus tracks in July of the following year) via Au-Go-Go Records. The group disbanded in 2001, although they occasionally reformed for additional shows.

== History ==
Guttersnipes were formed as a four-piece punk, pop band, in Melbourne in 1990 by Paul "Brocky" Brockhoff on guitar and vocals, Ian MacKaye on drums, Michael "Macca" McManus on bass guitar and Andrew "Ricey" Rice on guitar and vocals. According to Australian musicologist, Ian McFarlane, "Taking their cue from the likes of Hüsker Dü, Lemonheads, Fugazi and other 1980s US guitar bands, [they] traded in guitar-heavy pop. 'Melodic grunge' was a term often used to describe the band's loud, distorted yet tuneful approach." MacKaye was replaced on drums by Michael "Macca" McManus.

The band were signed to Au Go Go Records and released their debut single, "It's Over", in early 1991. The group's debut album, Blurred, followed in November of that year, initially as an eight-track, 10" long play. It was recorded with Simon Grounds as producer, audio engineer and mixer, from August to November. A CD version followed in July of the next year, with three bonus tracks from the "It's Over" single. During 1992 they supported gigs by visiting international groups, Lemonheads, Fugazi and Nirvana. During the 1990s they toured the eastern states, often together with fellow local label mates, Spiderbait, the Meanies and/or the Throwaways.

In the early 1990s they formed a triad of bands with the Throwaways and Spiderbait, to organise shows under the umbrella, Tell 'em It's Healthy. They performed at festivals, including Meredith in 1991 and 1992. The Guttersnipes are no longer a professional working band since 2001. They played the occasional show in Melbourne but these were rare.

== Members ==
- Paul Brockhoff – guitar, vocals
- Ian MacKaye – drums
- Michael McManus – bass guitar
- Andrew Rice – guitar, vocals
- Mark Hurst – drums

== Discography ==
=== Albums ===
- Blurred (2 November 1991) – Au Go Go Records (ANDA 144) 10" long play

=== Extended plays ===
- Face the Day (1996) Au Go Go Records (ANDA 201)

=== Singles ===
- "It's Over" (1990) Au Go Go Records (ANDA 129)

Split singles

- "Elephant Beer" (1992) on Hog / Cosmic Psychos / Guttersnipes / Empty Set with Ron Asheton, give-away with Lemon Fanzine, issue 15

== See also ==
- Punk rock in Australia
