= The Meanies =

Australian musical group

- Origin: Melbourne, Victoria, Australia
- Genres: Pop punk; alternative rock; punk rock
- Years active: 1988–1996; 2006–present
- Labels: Au Go Go; EmpTY; Poison City
- Members: Link Meanie (a.k.a. Lindsay McLennan); Ringo Meanie (a.k.a. Mark Hobbs); Kinky/Wally Meanie (a.k.a. Roderick Kempton); Jaws Meanie (a.k.a. Jordan Stanley)
- Past members: D.D. Meanie (a.k.a. Dennis DePianto); VB Meanie (a.k.a. Dave Christopher); Tasman "Tas" Blizzard
- Website: themeanies.net

The Meanies are an Australian punk rock band formed in 1988 by D.D. Meanie (a.k.a. Dennis DePianto) on lead guitar, Link Meanie (a.k.a. Lindsay McLennan) on vocals and guitar, Ringo Meanie (a.k.a. Mark Hobbs) on drums, and VB Meanie (a.k.a. Dave Christopher) on bass guitar and vocals. As from September 2015 the line-up is Link, Ringo and Wally Meanie (a.k.a. Roderick Kempton) on bass guitar and backing vocals. The Meanies had a hiatus from 1996 to 2006.

The band provides energetic performances, with Link injured on stage on several occasions. The group have issued four studio albums, Come 'n' See (1992), 10% Weird (1994), It's Not Me It's You (2015) and Desperate Measures (2020).

Founding member D.D. Meanie (Dennis DePianto) died in February 2008 after being diagnosed with cancer. Their guitarist from 1993 onwards, Tasman "Tas" Blizzard, died in August 2008 in a car accident.

== History ==
=== 1988-1991: Formation and EPs ===
The Meanies formed in Melbourne in 1988 as a punky power pop group by D.D. Meanie (a.k.a. Dennis DePianto) on lead guitar, Link Meanie (a.k.a. Lindsay McLennan) on vocals and guitar, Ringo Meanie (a.k.a. Mark Hobbs) on drums, and VB Meanie (a.k.a. Dave Christopher) on bass guitar and vocals. According to Australian musicologist, Ian McFarlane, they "were the undisputed kings of the inner-city/all-ages circuit. The band's frantic, Ramones-inspired power pop and hyperactive live shows drew capacity audiences of alacritous fans. The Meanies were also one of the most productive independent recording bands of the day."

Chris Johnston of Rolling Stone opined that their songs, "will all be short, between two and three minutes every time. Each burst of savage punk/pop noise will also be a potential anthem; an unclean riff with a beating heart of pure melody." Frenzal Rhomb cited them as one of their five influential bands.

During 1989 VB Meanie (Dave Christopher) was replaced on bass guitar by Kinky Meanie (later "Wally" Meanie, a.k.a. Roderick Kempton). Christopher moved to Adelaide where he founded Free Moving Curtis as Dave Plague. In the early 1990s, the Meanies performed primarily in their hometown, where they contacted local label owner, Bruce Milne, of Au Go Go Records, which issued three tracks, "Big Bertha", "Mr Authority" and "Our New Planet", on a Various Artists' split extended play, Boogie Wonderland (April 1990), with three tracks each by tour mates, the Throwaways, and Nice Girls from Cincinnati. McFarlane felt, "the Meanies weighed in with the best track, the short, sharp and very catchy 'Our New Planet'."

Kempton remembered how the split EP came about, "We never even thought of taking anything to a major label. Even that EP we recorded, Dave Kendall from the Throwaways suggested we put out a split 7-inch, with us... He investigated how much it would cost to get the record pressed... it was going to cost this much for a 7-inch, and only this much more for a 12-inch, so why don't we do a few songs each. Dave just happened to have it on him one day when he went shopping in Au-Go-Go and got talking to Bruce [Milne] behind the counter, and Bruce said 'yeah, I've heard of those bands' and he asked to listen to it. And it was pretty much the same day when Bruce rang up and offered to put it out."

A Various Artists' split album, Oh God Part 3 / How 'Bout It Baby, followed in September 1990, which included three more tracks by the Meanies, "Macho Wankers", "Mantra" and "Fade In, Fade Out", as well as additional material from Bored!, Nice Girls from Cincinnati, and the Dirty Lovers.

From November 1990 to March 1991 they released a run of EPs and singles, as limited edition 7-inch vinyl discs. Most of their material was written by Lindsay "Link Meanie" McLennan. They toured Australia, including appearances at Big Day Out festivals in 1992, 1993 and 1994. They supported local gigs by international artists from 1992, Nirvana, The Lemonheads, Pop Will Eat Itself, Redd Kross, Beastie Boys, Pearl Jam and Bad Brains.

=== 1992-1996: Come 'n' See, 10% Weird and hiatus ===
The Meanies' debut studio album, Come 'n' See, was released in April 1992, which was produced by Michael 'Ded' Kennedy and the Meanies. A PBS reviewer, described how they "had established themselves as one of Australia's pre-eminent underground rock bands through cultivating a huge all-age following and upsetting the rock establishment by breaking attendance records in the nation's capital cities." They supported a tour of Australia by the 5.6.7.8's, a Japanese rock trio, in August 1991 and followed them to Japan in next month. This led to a local label, Time Bomb Records, issuing their material into that market and further support slots backing Jackie & the Cedrics, Concrete Octopus, Blow One's Cool, and Rise from the Dead.

In January 1993 Tasman "Tas" Blizzard joined on lead guitar (ex-Seaweed Goorillas). The Meanies toured Europe and the United States in late 1993. While in the US they travelled to Seattle to record their second studio album, 10% Weird, which was released in August 1994, with Conrad Uno producing. Blizzard had left the group earlier in January of that year to return to Seaweed Goorillas but he rejoined the Meanies in mid-1995. The group went into hiatus in January 1996 with members undertaking individual projects and reformed in 2008.

=== 1998-present: Desperate Measures ===
In 2006 they released a DVD, The Meanies: A Seminal Australian Punk Tale, which features a documentary, Sorry 'bout the Violence, 11 music videos and a live concert filmed in 1994. They toured the Australian east coast in August–September 2006. In 2008 the Meanies promoted a series of 7-inch singles featuring previously unreleased tracks and cover versions of the Meanies' tracks performed by Cockfight Shootout, Digger and the Pussycats, The Drones, Dan Kelly and You Am I. Kempton told Emery of Beat Magazine, "The way we chose the bands was me finding out bands who loved the Meanies when they were younger... So Augie March are going to do a song because Glenn Richards was a Meanies fan when he was younger. Angie Hart is going to do a song because she used to come and see us, plus You Am I, Digger and the Pussycats, Double Agents, Snout, and we keep asking the Spazzys, but they still haven't got around to it."

On 14 February 2008 original member Dennis DePianto (D.D. Meanie), died at St. Vincents Hospital, Melbourne. He had been diagnosed with muscular dystrophy as a child, and towards the end of his life he contracted cancer. He was in the Meanies from their inception until 1995.

Guitarist, Tasman "Tas" Blizzard died on 1 August 2008, as a result of a car accident. His car had lost control in wet conditions along the Bellarine Peninsula and spun into a dam alongside the road. It was almost completely submerged – Blizzard was the only person in the car. First responder, Alistair Drayton of Mannerim CFA, swam into the murky water, but "discovered the victim deceased, still trapped in the driver's seat." The band added Jaws Meanie (a.k.a. Jordan Stanley) on guitar and continued as a four-piece – his first two gigs were tribute shows for DePianto and Blizzard, respectively.

Rolling Stone's Ryan Saar found, "[they] are surely one of Australia's favourite treasures. Stumbling upon their brand of grotesque power-pop is a venerable goldmine for any music fan seeking the loud and thrilling. Emerging during the moment at which grunge began to seep from an underground culture into mainstream acceptance." Saar felt that on their third studio album, It's Not Me, It's You, released in September 2015, which is "skating in at just over twenty minutes, [the group] re-introduce their thrashy punk soaked in pop fervour. With only a handful of songs breaking the three-minute mark, [they] do what they do best: rousing rock played to a lean and frenzied degree."

A 30th anniversary tour took place in 2019, followed by a fourth studio album, Desperate Measures in 2020.

They opened for the Foo Fighters on March 4th 2022 at GMHBA Stadium in Geelong, which the band described as "A 30-year full-circle moment" for as they had previously opened for Dave Grohl back in early 1992 when he was playing in Nirvana. This show was especially notable as it was the first stadium show in Australia after 2 years of lockdowns, with Victoria enduring the longest cumulative COVID-19 lockdown in the world.

In January 2026, The Meanies announced that they were halfway through their next album, and embarked on a 5 date tour across Australia in March of that year, including Lawncore Festival in Newcastle, which they cited as the reason for the tour.

== Band members ==
=== Current ===
- Link Meanie (Lindsay McLennan) – vocals and guitar (1988–1996, 1998–present)
- Jaws Meanie (Jordan Stanley) – lead guitar (2008–present)
- Wally Meanie (Roderick Kempton) – bass guitar and vocals (1989–1996, 1998–present)
- Ringo Meanie (Mark Hobbs) – drums (1988–1996, 1998–present)

=== Former ===
- VB Meanie (Dave Christopher) – bass guitar and vocals (1988–1989)
- D.D. Meanie (Dennis DePianto) – lead guitar (1988–1995, d. 2008)
- Tas (Tasman Blizzard) – lead guitar (1993–1996, 1998–2008, d. 2008)

== Discography ==
=== Studio albums ===
Title	Details
Come 'N' See	Released: April 1992; Label: Au Go Go (ANDA 138); Format: CD, LP
10% Weird	Released: August 1994; Label: Au Go Go (ANDA 176); Format: CD
It's Not Me It's You	Released: September 2015; Label: Poison City Records (PCR109CD); Format: CD, LP, DD, streaming
Desperate Measures	Released: July 2020; Label: Cheersquad Records & Tape (CRT020); Format: CD, LP, DD, streaming

=== Live albums ===
Title	Details
25 Live: Live At The Hi-Fi	Released: 2019; Label: Cheersquad Records & Tape (CRT017); Format: CD, LP, DD, streaming

=== Compilation albums ===
Title	Details
The Meanie Of Life (Long Gone Singles + Other Bits)	Released: 1993; Label: Au Go Go (ANDA 160); Format: CD

=== Extended plays ===
Title	Details
In Search Of...	Released: 1992; Label: Au Go Go (ANDA 150); Format: CD, LP
Six Suitable Tracks	Released: 2000; Label: Full Toss (TOSS013); Format: CD, LP
Secrets of the Ancients Revealed	Released: 2001; Label: Munster Records (MR 210); Format: CD, LP

=== Video albums ===
Title	Details
The Meanies: A Seminal Australian Punk Tale	Released: 2006; Label: Taiyo Films/Madman (MMA2358); Format: DVD
