= Bored (band) =

Australian punk rock band

Bored!
- Origin: Geelong, Victoria, Australia
- Genres: Punk rock
- Years active: 1987–1993
- Labels: Grown Up Wrong, Dog Meat Records, Rattlesnake, Survival, Full Toss
- Past members: Grant Gardner; Adrian Hann; Justin Munday; John Nolan; Dave Thomas

Bored (stylised as Bored!) were an Australian punk band formed in Geelong in 1987. The original line-up was Grant Gardner on bass guitar, Adrian Hann on keyboards, Justin Munday on drums, John Nolan on guitar (ex-Behind the Magnolia Curtain) and Dave Thomas on guitar and vocals (ex-Bodies, Slaughter House). In 1989 Gardner was replaced by Tim Hemensley (ex-Royal Flush, God). Both Hemensley and Nolan left in 1991 to form Powder Monkeys. Bored! released five studio albums by 1993 and disbanded later that year. Thomas briefly joined Magic Dirt and subsequently enlisted various line-ups for reformed versions of Bored! in 1998, 1999 and 2000.

== History ==
=== 1987-1993: Bored! ===
Bored! were formed as a punk rock band in Geelong in 1987 with Grant Gardner on bass guitar, Adrian Hann on keyboards, Justin Munday on drums, John Nolan on guitar (ex-Behind the Magnolia Curtain) and Dave Thomas on guitar and vocals (ex-Bodies, Slaughter House). Thomas' previous punk band, Bodies, had formed in Geelong in 1983, by 1985 he had joined the Melbourne-based group, Slaughter House. Late in 1986, Thomas started a new band, International Rescue, which successively became Sister Anne and then White Noise. By 1987, the group had the line-up of Gardner, Hann, Munday, Nolan and Thomas and were renamed as Bored!. Their name was derived from a 1978 single, "Bored", by Detroit punk rockers Destroy All Monsters.

In October 1988, Bored! released their debut extended play, Bored!, on the independent label, Grown Up Wrong, which included a cover version of Lobby Loyde's "Human Being". Punk rock webzine, Noise for Heroes' Steven Gardner, described the EP, "basic, heavy riffs that grind away, drums that never tap when they can bludgeon, and David Thomas singing voice, a voice whose general texture sounds like The Rules being ripped in two." In the following year they released, Negative Waves, their first studio album. After its appearance Gardner was replaced on bass guitar by Tim Hemensley (ex-Royal Flush, God). With Hemensley on board they released Take It Out on You, in 1990 and toured Europe.

In 1991 Hemensley and Nolan left to form Powder Monkeys, Munday and Thomas continued with Russell Baricevic (Gas Babies, Macho Clowns) on bass guitar. In December they released a third album, Feed the Dog, on Rattlesnake Records. Their fourth album, Junk, was released in October 1992 with eight tracks produced by The Celibate Rifles' guitarist, Kent Steedman; and four tracks by Rose Tattoo's Peter Wells. In March 1993 their fifth album, Scuzz, collected thirteen studio out-takes, recorded between 1991 and 1992, and nine live tracks recorded on 13 May 1992 at Prince of Wales Hotel. By the end of 1993 Bored! had disbanded.

=== 1993-present: After disbandment ===
Thomas (guitar & vocals), Randall (guitar), Baricevic (bass)& Stacey (drums) toured Europe in 1994.

Dave Thomas managed fellow Geelong band, Magic Dirt, he later joined the group on guitar from August 1995 to July 1997.

Tim Hemensley (1972 – July 2003) on bass guitar and lead vocals, and John Nolan on guitar, founded punk, indie rockers, Powder Monkeys (1991–2002).

From 1997 Baricevic, Munday and Thomas periodically reformed Bored! with Matt Randall on rhythm guitar. In 1999 Thomas oversaw a 2× CD compilation album, Chunks 1988-'94, for Full Toss Records, which was issued in March 2000. In 2000 the Bored! line-up of Thomas with Buzz Munday on drums and Ben Watkins on bass guitar undertook a short European tour. In 2010, the Bored! line up of Thomas, John Nolan on guitar, Russell Baricevic on bass guitar and Justin 'Buzz' Munday on drums reunited to play the Monster Sessions gig at the Esplanade Hotel, St. Kilda.

Thomas died from cancer in 2020. Former guitarist John Nolan died in December 2021, aged 55.

== Members ==
- Grant Gardner – bass guitar (1987–1989)
- Adrian Hann – keyboards (1987)
- Justin 'Buzz' Munday – drums (1987–2022)
- John Nolan – guitar (1987–1991) (died 2021)
- Dave Thomas – guitar, vocals (1987–1993, 1997, 1998, 1999, 2000, 2020) (died in 2020)
- Tim Hemensley – bass guitar, vocals (1989–1991) (died 2003)
- Russell Baricevic – bass guitar, vocals (1991–2022)
- Tas Blizzard – guitar (1991) (died 2008)
- Mel Randall – rhythm guitar (1991, 1994, 1997–2022)
- Matt Daley – guitar (2008–2022)
- Mark Stacey – drums (1994) (died January 2017)
- Ben Watkins – bass guitar (2000)

== Discography ==
=== Studio albums ===
Title	Details
Negative Waves	Released: 1989; Label: Dog Meat Records (DOG 006); Format: LP, Cassette
Take It Out on You	Released: 1990; Label: Dog Meat Records (DOG 012); Format: LP, Cassette
Feed the Dog	Released: December 1991; Label: Survival (RAT 520); Format: LP, Cassette
Junk	Released: October 1992; Label: Survival (SUR524CD); Format: LP, CD
Scuzz	Released: March 1993; Label: Shagpile (SHAGCD 2011); Format: CD

=== Live albums ===
Title	Details
Get Off My Wah-Wah And Suck This - Live!	Released: 1988; Label: Caveman Records (Tape 001); Format: Cassette

=== Compilation albums ===
Title	Details
Chunks 1988–'94	Released: March 2000; Label: Full Toss (TOSS003); Format: 2× CD
Piggyback	Released: 2016; Label: Bang Records (BANG!-LP100); Format: LP; Note: Limited Edition of 500 copies

=== Extended plays ===
Title	Details
Bored!	Released: October 1988; Label: Grown Up Wrong (WRONG 8); Format: LP
