= Rocket Science (band) =

Australian alternative rock band

- Origin: Melbourne, Victoria, Australia
- Genre: Alternative rock
- Years active: 1998–2008, 2014–present
- Labels: Modular/EMI, Hot Spot, IT Records
- Members: Dave Gray; Paul Maybury; Roman Tucker; Kit Warhurst
- Past members: Mickey Heartbreak

Rocket Science are an Australian alternative rock band from Melbourne, Victoria, formed in June 1998. They released four studio albums during their initial run: Welcome Aboard the 3C10 (2000), Contact High (2002), Eternal Holiday (2004) and Different Like You (2008), the latter of which was released months before their split. The band reunited in 2014 and has since released a further two studio albums: Snake (2019) and Push Play (2023).

Contact High and Eternal Holiday charted at 60 and 67, respectively, in the top 100 of the ARIA Albums Chart, while Contact High's single "Being Followed" charted at number 91 in the triple j Hottest 100 of 2002.

== History ==
=== 1998–2003: Welcome Aboard the 3C10 and Contact High ===
Rocket Science was formed in Melbourne in June 1998 by Dave Gray (of The Hogs) on semi-acoustic bass guitar, Paul Maybury (Freeloaders) on guitar, Roman Tucker (The Martians) on lead vocals and keyboards, and Kit Warhurst (Velvet Tongue) on drums. The group released its debut single, "Burn in Hell," in 1999.

Their debut album, Welcome Aboard the 3C10, was issued on 1 May 2000 via Modular Recordings. Several tracks from their first rehearsal were used on the album.

Rocket Science's second album, Contact High, was released on 11 February 2002, reaching No. 60 on the ARIA Albums Chart. Michael Dwyer from The Age described it as "a refinement of a unique sonic formula that read something like this: schlock-horror/weird sci-fi films plus obscure garage-punk music plus massive vintage keyboard contraption complete with theremin equals Rocket Science." Carmine Pascuzzi of MediaSearch opined that "[it] shows good improvement – showcasing powerful rock and electronic grooves. They give a genuine tilt at the rock 'n' roll styling," where the group "demonstrates a purpose and ambition in delivering some infectious tracks. They are an interesting band with interesting ideas."

=== 2004–2007: Eternal Holiday and Tucker's coma ===
By April 2004, the band's third album had been recorded, but Tucker suffered a serious injury from a fall and was put into an induced coma for ten days. This forced the band to cancel all scheduled performances until June. For an appearance at the Fuji Rock Festival in 2004, Maybury was replaced on guitar by Andre Warhurst (brother of Kit) when Maybury was unable to travel due to a broken leg. Andre Warhurst features in the video for the single Eternal Holiday, which was filmed in Japan during the visit. The album, Eternal Holiday, was released on 15 September 2004 and was produced by Jim Diamond. The album reached No. 67 on the ARIA Albums Chart.

The Australian Record Industry Association reported that after his accident, Tucker had "remembered precious little of the experience, but when the other members played him the finished product, he thought that whoever it was, it was pretty good." Dwyer reviewed the album, which showed "a noticeable shift in the creative base. Warhurst's increased input as a writer and harmony singer has resulted in a more melodic and accessible finish to an ever-tighter band chemistry." The title track was released as the album's lead single, which a FasterLouder reviewer described as, "Despite the morbid undertones that inspired the song, it carries a surprisingly upbeat feeling overall with only a slight sense of gloom seeping in through the lyrics."

Their label dropped the group, but they recorded a fourth album, Different Like You, which was released on 26 July 2008. It was engineered and produced by Maybury at his recording studio. Luke McGrath from BMA Magazine felt it was "not so much a progression as a refinement – Different Like You is as loud, as brash, and as concentrated a dose of Rocket Science as any fan could want." Shane Arnold from Music Feeds described its "raw high energy songs infused with theremin and rock & roll" and the group as "easily one of the best (and craziest) live acts going around currently, and any albums like this are only going to enhance their reputation."

The album was preceded by the single "Psychic Man" Trevor Block of Mess+Noise website found it as "three-and-a-half minutes of growling Seeds/Stones hybrid, bursting with energy and plenty of the Science's trademark Farfisa organ honking all over a simple borrowed riff." By August 2008, Mickey Heartbreak (The Dead South) had joined on guitar. The group disbanded in late 2008.

=== 2014–present: Reformation and new music ===
In 2014, the group reformed. In October 2014, Rocket Science reconvened for a benefit concert for Mick Blood of Lime Spiders at The Tote Hotel, Collingwood. They performed at the Leaps and Bounds Festival in July 2015.

In April 2018, Rocket Science released their first single, "Lipstick Red", from their then-unnamed fifth studio album. The album, Snake, was released in August 2019. Two further singles were released from the album: "I Hate Hate" and "Cheers Pinger." In July 2020, the band released their first live album entitled Live 2020. In September 2023, the band released their sixth studio album, Push Play.

== Line up ==
Current members

- Dave Gray – bass guitar
- Paul Maybury – guitar, backing vocals
- Roman Tucker – lead vocals, keyboards, theremin
- Kit Warhurst – drums, backing vocals

Past members

- Mickey Heartbreak – guitar (2008)

== Discography ==
=== Albums ===
List of studio albums, with selected details and chart positions
Title	Album details	Peak chart positions
Title	Album details	AUS
Welcome Aboard the 3C10	Released: 1 May 2000; Label: Modular (MODCD008); Format: CD	—
Contact High	Released: 11 February 2002; Label: Modular (MODCD015); Format: CD	60
Eternal Holiday	Released: 15 September 2004; Label: Modular (MODCD029); Format: CD	67
Different Like You	Released: 26 July 2008; Label: High Spot (HSR001); Format: CD	—
Snake	Released: 11 August 2019; Label: IT (itCD015/itLP015); Format: CD, LP, digital download, streaming	—
Push Play	Released: 22 September 2023; Label: Cheersquad Records & Tapes; Format: CD, LP, digital download, streaming	—

=== Live albums ===
List of live albums
Title	Album details
Live 2020	Released: 3 July 2020; Label: IT Records; Format: Digital download

=== Singles ===
List of singles, with year and details
Title	Year	Album
"Burn in Hell"	1999	Welcome Aboard the 3C10
"Copycat"	2000	Welcome Aboard the 3C10
"One Robot"	2001	Contact High
"Being Followed"	2001	Contact High
"Heavy Traffic"/"Going Away"	2002	Contact High
"Run Like a Gun"	2003	Contact High
"Sex Call"	2004	Eternal Holiday
"Eternal Holiday"	2004	Eternal Holiday
"Psychic Man"	2008	Different Like You
"Lipstick Red"	2018	Snake
"I Hate Hate"	2019	Snake
"Cheers Pinger"	2019	Snake
"Agitation"	2023	Push Play
"Fashion Emergency"	2023	Push Play
