= My Pal =

Single by God
- B-side: "A Man Without A Woman Is Like A Nun Without A Jackhammer"
- Label: Au Go Go Records
- Songwriter(s): God, Joel Silbersher

"My Pal" is a 1988 single from Australian band God.

== Details ==
Formed in Melbourne in 1986, the members of God were all 15 or 16 at the time

Bruce Milne of Au Go Go Records signed the band and released "My Pal" as their debut single in January 1988. It was written by Silbersher.

Silbersher later said, "It was the first good song I ever wrote. And it was extremely easy to write the music. I thought up that line that goes through the whole thing and I was trying to think of another one, and then went... oh no, if you just do this... that's a song. That's a whole piece of music. And then I had the 'You're my only friend / You don't even like me' bit but then it took a while to erode the other lyrics into it. Elsewhere, he has said that he wrote it in the shower when he was 15.

Milne said, "I remember playing the tape. And I don't think I even got towards the end of it before I just said 'I've got to put this out'. There was no doubt it was going to be a renowned record, if not necessarily a huge seller. It was just one of those records. The reason why you start a record label is for those sort of golden moments."

== Reception ==
The single received favourable reviews, and was later considered "an enduring Australian underground classic." Australian musicologist, Ian McFarlane, observed, "[they] had an alternative #1 hit on their hands before they were even old enough to get beer riders at their gigs! "My Pal" was the third biggest selling alternative single for 1988."

Junkee described it as, "a frenetic ballad that contains one of the most iconic riffs in modern Australian rock — famously, they were often turned away from the venues that they were booked to play on account of being underage. Guess there are some things you can only do when you’re young, and that writing a perfect, scuzzy pub rock song is one of them."

The Guardian said it was, "one of the best singles ever made by anyone, anywhere, anytime. But "My Pal" endures mostly as Australia’s eternal garage band classic, our "Louie Louie", or "Wild Thing", or "Surfin' Bird" – one of the things you learn to play on your first electric guitar. The resounding charm of My Pal lies in the fact that it sounds like the same was true of the people who made it.

Andrew Stafford, writer of Pig City: from the Saints to Savage Garden, listed "My Pal" at 24 in his "Australian Songbook", saying, "it was such a towering feat that, unfortunately, it overshadowed everything else they ever did".
