= Dog Meat Records =

Dog Meat Records was a record label releasing music from bands in the Australian independent rock music scene in the 1990s. It released music from such artists as Hoss, The Philisteins, Powder Monkeys, Splatterheads and Blues Hangover, including some non-Australian musical acts.

Dog Meat was a continuation of an earlier label, Grown Up Wrong!, which released records, including some by local Melbourne bands in the mid 1980s. Both of these labels were entirely creatively controlled by Dave Laing, from Melbourne. Also, both labels were named after songs, Grown Up Wrong after a Rolling Stones song, and Dog Meat after a Flamin' Groovies song.

In 1993 the label issued a various artists compilation album, Set It on Fire.

== See also ==
- List of record labels
