= The Philisteins =

Tasmanian punk band

- Also known as: The Cheesemongers
- Origin: Hobart, Tasmania, Australia
- Genres: Garage punk
- Years active: 1985–1992
- Labels: Greasy Pop, Sympathy for the Record Industry, Dog Meat, Off the Hip
- Past members: Aydn Hibberd; Guy Lucas; Charlie Shackloth; Konrad Park; Mark Coombes; Nick Bruer; Ian Wettenhall; Stewart Tabert

The Philisteins were a garage punk band formed in Hobart in 1985 as The Cheesemongers with a line-up including; Aydn Hibberd on guitar, vocals and harmonica; and Guy Lucas on guitar, vocals and organ. In 1986 Konrad Park joined on drums and they adopted a new name, The Philisteins. In late 1986 they issued their debut album, Reverberations, and soon after relocated to Adelaide and signed with local label, Greasy Pop Records. In December 1988 they released an eight-track extended play, Bloody Convicts, Ian Wettenhall on bass guitar and Nick Bruer on drums. They followed with a six-track EP, Some Kind of Philisteins, in November 1989, with Bruer replaced by Stewart Tabert. Their full-length album, Lifestyles of the Wretched and Forgettable, appeared in November of the next year on Dog Meat Records and they had moved to Melbourne. In September 1992 they disbanded and Lucas, Tabert and Wettenhall joined ex-GOD member, Sean Greenaway in a new group, The Freeloaders. Hibberd was a founding member of indie rock band, Powder Monkeys. In March 1998 Guy Lucas died of a drug overdose. A compilation album, A Savage Affection: 1986–1992, appeared in December 2007.

== History ==
The Philisteins formed in Hobart in 1985 as a garage punk band with a line-up of Scott Harrison on bass guitar; Aydn Hibberd on guitar, vocals and harmonica; Guy Lucas on guitar, vocals and organ; and Charlie Shackloth on drums. Originally they performed as The Cheesemongers until Shackloth was replaced on drums by Konrad Park in 1986. Their influences were 1960s R&B bands from the United Kingdom and American garage punk groups. The new name was supplied by a friend, Stewart Tabert, who recalled "I was listening to The Damned's The Black Album and [my mother] came in and said 'Will you shut up, you Philistine!' ... and I thought that's not a bad moniker for the band". Late in 1986 the group issued their debut album, Reverberations, as a cassette. According to Australian musicologist, Ian McFarlane, their "raucous blend of punk/ R&B/psychedelia was soundly despised outside a small cult following". Lucas described Reverberations, "I don't like it at all...it sucks [...] Me and Stewart drank much of the proceeds before we left the state". "Haha, Guy would say that" says Hibberd, "actually Guy, Scott and I split the bread and it helped us get outta Tassie".

In February 1987 they relocated to Adelaide and signed with local label, Greasy Pop Records. By that time Mark Coombes had replaced Park on drums. Soon after Harrison was replaced on bass guitar by Ian Wettenhall and Coombes left with Nick Bruer joining on drums. From April to June 1988 they recorded an eight-track extended play, Bloody Convicts, with Doug Thomas producing, which was issued in December. The EP provided a cover version of US band The Lollipop Shoppe's "You Must Be a Witch". McFarlane described Bloody Convicts' sound as "neatly between 1970s punk and 1960s psychedelia, with plenty of guitar riffs to the fore". By the time of its release Bruer had been replaced by Tabert on drums. It appeared in the US market on the Sympathy for the Record Industry label.

In May 1989 they recorded another EP with Thomas producing, Some Kind of Philisteins. A month later they returned to Hobart and by November they were based in Sydney. The six-track EP had appeared in that month, which McFarlane found to have a "more punkish edge". A four-track version, Some Kind, was issued by Sympathy for the Record Industry into the US market. Three of its tracks came from the Australian EP and a new track, "Train to Disaster", had been recorded in Melbourne in June. After staying in Sydney for a year, playing more gigs touring outside NSW than in, the group moved to Melbourne where they signed to the local Dog Meat label. In November 1990 they recorded their full-length album, Lifestyles of the Wretched and Forgettable, with Colin Freeman producing. It was released in November of the next year.

In 1992 The Philisteins played their last gig at The Doghouse hotel in a quickie farewell tour of Hobart, with Lucas, Tabert and Wettenhall joining Sean Greenaway to form a garage rock group, The Freeloaders. That same year Hibberd was a founding member of Powder Monkeys. In March 1998 Guy Adrian Robert Lucas died of a drug overdose. In December 2007 Off the Hip label issued a 2× CD compilation album by The Philisteins, A Savage Affection: 1986–1992. The first disc contains all tracks from Bloody Convicts, Some Kind and various cover versions; the second disc contains all tracks from Lifestyles of the Wretched and Forgettable and additional tracks from a 1989 demo/rehearsal tape. I-94 Bar music website's reviewer described their work as "stellar brand of psychedelic garage punk" and felt the first disc to be better with "songs [that] are rock solid and Guy Lucas' talent as a vocalist and distinctive guitar player is well evident".

== Members ==
- Aydn Hibberd – guitar, vocals, harmonica (1985–1992)
- Guy Lucas – guitar, vocals, organ (1985–1992) (died March 1998)
- Charlie Shackloth – drums (1985)
- Konrad Park – drums (1986)
- Mark Coombes – drums (1986)
- Nick Bruer – drums (1986–1987)
- Ian Wettenhall – bass guitar (1987–1992)
- Stewart Tabert – drums (1987–1992)

== Discography ==
=== Albums ===
- Reverberations (1987)
- Lifestyles of the Wretched and Forgettable (November 1991, Dog Meat Records)
- A Savage Affection: 1986–1992 (December 2007, Off the Hip) aka A Savage Affair

=== Extended plays ===
- Bloody Convicts (December 1988, Greasy Pop Records)
- Some Kind of Philisteins (November 1989, Greasy Pop Records)
- Some Kind (December 1989, Sympathy for the Record Industry)
