= Bruce Milne =

Australian music journalist

- Born: 1957 (age 68–69); Melbourne, Victoria, Australia
- Occupations: Writer, radio presenter, DJ, record retailer, label runner, publican, promoter, A&R agent
- Employer(s): Roadrunner, Fast Forward, 3RRR

Bruce Milne (born 1957) is a writer, radio presenter and Australian music industry figure. He first presented on 3CR and has been involved with 3RRR since 1977. He has been involved with Missing Link Records, Au Go Go Records, Giant Claw, Reliant and In-Fidelity. Milne is also a notable creator of punk zines, notably among them Fast Forward. In the 1990s and 2000s, he ran various major label ventures and The International bar, then took over The Tote Hotel in Collingwood. Milne now works at Greville Records in Prahran and hosts Where Yo Is on 3RRR.

== Career ==
In 1977, Milne started his career as a volunteer announcer at 3CR, put out Australia's first punk fanzine Plastered Press, put on the first-ever gig by the Boys Next Door, and helped put on the 'Punk Gunk' gig on the street in Carlton on New Year's Eve. In 1978, he collaborated with Clinton Walker on the Pulp fanzine. That year he also switched to 3RRR, presenting the show Know Your Product. He and Walker then debuted the Roadrunner Australian music magazine in Adelaide,. Milne then formed Au-Go-Go Records to release a single by The Young Charlatans, a band he managed, but they broke up before he could do so. Instead, the label's first release was the Overnight EP by Two Way Garden.

Milne then went to work for Keith Glass on his Missing Link Records shop and label. Bands then on Missing Link included Birthday Party, the Laughing Clowns, Whirlywirld and the Go Betweens. Milne also worked closely with Innocent Records. At the end of 1978, Milne and Andrew Maine developed the post-punk cassette-zine Fast Forward that became internationally known and inspired the launch of Sub-Pop in Seattle. When Keith Glass sold the Missing Link shop to concentrate on its label iteration, Milne opened his own shop iteration of Au-Go-Go with a new partner Greta Moon. He signed such acts as the Scientists and Dave Graney’s band the Moodists, and put out compilation albums like Asleep at the Wheel.

While still running Au-Go-Go as it put out more records by bands like Little Murders, Harem Scarem, the Zimmermen and many others, Milne went back to 3RRR with Phil Brophy to launch, in 1985, the long-running, cult pop culture program Eeek! Au-Go-Go expanded in the mid-'80s to start locally releasing recordings by emerging international acts like Sonic Youth, Mudhoney, Tav Falco's Panther Burns and Big Black, and then in the '90s, local underground bands like the Meanies, Spiderbait and Magic Dirt, before a split between Milne and Moon precipitated the label's demise.

In the late '80s, Milne went into partnership with Peter Lawrance to open the Kill City crime fiction specialist bookshop. The shop led to the establishment of the Ned Kelly Awards for Australian crime writing and also spawned David Honeybee's fanzine Crime Factory.

Milne produced the eight-volume Born Bad compilation series, celebrating The Cramps, and the Japanese underground compilation Tokyo Trashville. He also headed up the trans-national label Giant Claw, which released singles by American as well as Japanese and Australian bands. Around this period, Milne even played in a band, the Love Moods.

In the late '90s when Roger Grierson moved from PolyGram to Festival Records, the Australian major label owned by Rupert Murdoch, he offered Milne a label deal, and thus Reliant Records was born. Reliant signed bands like the Underground Lovers and Gerling, and in 1999 released the debut solo album by Milne's old schoolmate and former Birthday Party guitarist Rowland S. Howard, Teenage Snuff Film. Reliant folded when Milne moved to EMI to take up an A&R position. In 2002, he went into partnership with Steve Stavrakis, who'd previously headed Waterfront Records in Sydney, and the pair launched In-Fidelity Records which signed The Datsuns, Dan Kelly, The Drones, The Dirtbombs, Japan's Guitar Wolf and others.

After gaining experience running the venue the International Bar in Melbourne's Chinatown, Milne took over The Tote Hotel in Collingwood. But with the government trying to stamp out rowdy late-night behaviour in the city, the Tote was made a scapegoat, and Liquor Licensing Victoria forced it to shut down. The closure of the Tote in 2010 became a cause celebre forcing state governments to re-think the worth of a vibrant music culture and night-time economy. "The Tote can't be saved," Milne said to the crowd outside the pub at a massive rally on its last night, "but live music in Melbourne can."

With the support of Music Victoria and SLAM (Save Live Australian Music), the Melbourne circuit survived and the Tote reopened. However, Milne suffered financial difficulties as fallout from the Tote's closure and was forced to sell his record collection.

He now works at Greville Records in Prahran, Victoria, runs bus tours about Melbourne's live music history and hosts the Sunday night show Where Yo Is on 3RRR.
