= Joel Silbersher =

- Also known as: Joel Rock'n'Roll, Melonman
- Born: 1971 (age 54–55)
- Genre: rock
- Occupations: DJ, musician, songwriter
- Instruments: Guitar, vocals, Bass, Keyboards, Drums
- Years active: 1984–present

Joel Silbersher is a musician from Melbourne, Australia, who was the singer and guitar player for rock and roll band, GOD (1986–1989) and hard rockers, Hoss (1990–2019). GOD had a minor but enduring hit with "My Pal," a song written by Silbersher. Since its release in 1988, "My Pal" has been covered by bands such as Dinosaur Jr, Magic Dirt, Violent Soho, Bonnie Prince Billy, Crippled Black Phoenix, Tide of Iron, Bad//Dreems and Peabody. At the closing of Melbourne's Tote Hotel, Silbersher and the Drones played "My Pal" as the final song.

Silbersher released Tendrils with Charlie Owen in 1995. The duo released Soaking Red as Tendrils in 1998.

Silbersher released the solo album Greasy Lens on King Crab Records in October 2002.

== Discography ==
=== Albums ===
List of albums, with selected details
Title	Details
Tendrils (with Charlie Owen)	Released: June 1995; Format: CD; Label: Dog Meat (DOG065CD)
Soaking Red (as Tendrils)	Released: September 1998; Format: CD; Label: Half a Cow (HAC 71)
Greasy Lens	Released: 2002; Format: CD; Label: King Crab Records (KC005)

== Awards and nominations ==
=== ARIA Music Awards ===
The ARIA Music Awards is an annual awards ceremony that recognises excellence, innovation, and achievement across all genres of Australian music. They commenced in 1987.

Year	Nominee / work	Award	Result	Ref.
1999	Soaking Red (as Tendrils)	ARIA Award for Best Adult Alternative Album	Nominated	
