= Au Go Go Records =

Australian independent record label

- Founded: 1979
- Founder: Bruce Milne; Philip Morland
- Distributors: Festival Records; MGM Distribution; Shock Records
- Genre: Various
- Country of origin: Australia
- Location: Melbourne, Victoria
- Official website: Au Go Go Records

Au Go Go Records is a Melbourne, Australia based independent record label. It was founded by Bruce Milne and Philip Morland from a house in Brunswick Street, Fitzroy in 1979 and was later operated by Greta Moon.

The label started releasing bands on the Melbourne punk and new wave scene. Its first release was in 1979 with the EP Overnight by Two Way Garden. The label's first 25 releases included debut recordings of some seminal Australian acts such as Crackajacks, Marching Girls, Clint Small, Scapa Flow, Little Murders, the Zorros, Dorian Gray and Plays With Marionettes (later The Wreckery, featuring Hugo Race). Philip Morland left and Greta Moon joined in 1982.

By 1982 the label had started to increase its profile due to the local and overseas success of bands like The Moodists (featuring Dave Graney and Mick Turner later of Dirty Three). Notable releases included the Scientists' "Swampland" (actually the b-side of the single "This Is My Happy Hour") and God's "My Pal", one of the label's most popular releases, as well as titles by Ollie Olsen's band No, Harem Scarem, various compilations such as the Asleep at the Wheel collection of (mostly unsigned) Melbourne bands, and the well-received Hard To Beat, a double album tribute to the Stooges, featuring many Australian acts. In April 1989, the label released the debut single by the Candy Harlots, entitled Red Hot Rocket, with the initial 500 copies pressed on red vinyl and wrapped in a pair of women's knickers printed with the band name.

The label also branched out into international releases, issuing albums (under license) by overseas bands such as Sonic Youth, Mudhoney, Dinosaur Jr., Big Black and The 5.6.7.8's. Au Go Go was also instrumental in helping these bands tour Australia. in 1989 Bruce Milne started an offshoot label, Giant Claw Records, to issue 7" singles.

The Au-Go-Go record label continued throughout the 1990s, issuing early releases from such Australian acts as Spiderbait, The Meanies and Magic Dirt, the latter becoming one of the label's top attractions. Magic Dirt left Au Go Go in 1999, and the label never fully recovered.

Many of Au Go Go's releases are now out of print and are fast becoming collector's items.

== Au Go Go Records shop ==
In 1987, with the success of their mail-order and distribution services, Au Go Go opened a record shop at a retail space in Little Collins St in Melbourne's CBD, also taking over the lease of Gaslight's suburban Malvern store. Later the business moved to its best-known location of 349 Little Bourke St on the corner of Somerset Place, then in June 2000 to a smaller space in Somerset Place. The retail aspect closed in late 2003 and elements of the business were absorbed into the operations of Shock Records. The Au Go Go website was last updated Tue 3 Feb 2009.

In the 2000s, Bruce Milne was involved in running Melbourne pub/rock venue The Tote Hotel in Collingwood, as well as a new label, In-Fidelity Recordings. He continues to be a sought-after DJ and radio presenter, co-hosting Melbourne Music Bus Tours which is associated with the Arts Centre Melbourne's Australian Music Vault.

== See also ==
- Lists of record labels
