= List of Nirvana concerts =

From March 1987 to March 1, 1994, Nirvana performed a variety of shows and concerts.

== Early gigs ==
Date	City	Country	Venue	Other Performers	Attendance
Early April 1987	Aberdeen	United States	Unknown	*First show according to Slim Moon	
April 18, 1987	Tacoma	United States	Community World Theater	Soylent Green, Yellow Snow, & Nisqually Delta Podunk Nightmare	
May 1, 1987	Olympia	United States	GESSCO Hall	Danger Mouse, Landsat Blister, & Nisqually Delta Podunk Nightmare	
May 6, 1987	Olympia	United States	KAOS (FM)		
June 12, 1987	Tacoma	United States	Community World Theater	My Name, & Killdozer	
June 27, 1987	Tacoma	United States	Community World Theater	Hell's Kitchen, Soylent Green, & Silent Treatment	
July, 1987 (Note: For a long time, it was believed that this was the first Nirvana show, but in recent years photographs and recordings have come available that indicates that this is unlikely. The Raymond gig was most likely held in the summer of 1987. Their actual first show has not been documented, but took place around April 1st, 1987 in Aberdeen, WA, according to close friend Slim Moon.)	Raymond	United States	17 Nussbaum Road	*It's speculation that this show was in July, it could've been August or slightly later, we'd need confirmation from someone in attendance.	
August 9, 1987	Tacoma	United States	Community World Theater	Inspector Luv and the Magnet Men, & Sons of Ishmael	
January 23, 1988	Tacoma	United States	Community World Theater	Happy Dead Juans, Moral Crux & Soon *Dale Crover played drums.	
March 12, 1988	Olympia	United States	The Caddyshack	*First show with Dave Foster on drums.	
March 19, 1988	Tacoma	United States	Community World Theater	Lush & Vampire Lezbos	
March 26, 1988	Olympia	United States	The Witch House		
April 10, 1988	Seattle	United States	The Central Tavern		
April 24, 1988	Seattle	United States	The Vogue (Sub Pop Sunday)	Blood Circus	
May 14, 1988	Olympia	United States	The Glass House	Lansdat Blister & Sister Skelter *Last show with Dave Foster.	
May 21, 1988	Olympia	United States	Evergreen State College	Herd of Turtles, Lansdat Blister, The Speds & Telefunken *First show with Chad Channing on drums.	
May 27, 1988	Olympia	United States	The Glass House	Sister Skelter	
May 29, 1988	Seattle	United States	The Vogue		
June 2, 1988	Seattle	United States	Central Tavern (Toe Jam 88)	Chemistry Set	
June 17, 1988	Ellensburg	United States	Hal Holmes Community Center	King Crab, Lush & Millions of Dead Leninz	
June 29, 1988	Seattle	United States	Moore Theatre		
July 3, 1988	Seattle	United States	The Vogue (Sub Pop Sunday)	Blood Circus & Fluid	
July 23, 1988	Seattle	United States	Central Tavern	Leaving Trains	
July 30, 1988	Seattle	United States	Squid Row Tavern	Skin Yard	
August 20, 1988	Olympia	United States	Capitol Lake Park (Capitol Lake Jam)	My Name, Soundgarden & Swallow	
August 29, 1988	Seattle	United States	The Vogue	Treacherous Jaywalkers	
October 23, 1988	Bainbridge Island	United States	Birthday Party (Skate Ramp)		
October 28, 1988	Seattle	United States	Union Station	Blood Circus & Butthole Surfers	
October 30, 1988	Olympia	United States	Dorm K208, Evergreen State College	Lansdat Blister & Lush First single, Love Buzz, released two days later.	
November 23, 1988	Bellingham	United States	Speedy O'Tubbs Rhythmic Underground	Coffin Break & Skin Yard	
December 1, 1988	Seattle	United States	The Underground	Coffin Break & D.O.A.	
December 21, 1988	Hoquiam	United States	Eagles Hall/FoE Aerie 252	Attica & Psychlodds	
December 28, 1988	Seattle	United States	The Underground, Sub Pop 200 release party	Blood Circus, Jesse Bernstein, Swallow, Tad & The Thrown Ups	
January 6, 1989	Portland	United States	Satyricon	Mudhoney	
January 21, 1989	Portland	United States	Satyricon	Dharma Bums	
February 5, 1989	Olympia	United States	Dorm K208, Evergreen State College (dorm party)	Helltrout & Psychlodds *First show with Jason Everman on guitar.	
February 10, 1989	San Francisco	United States	Covered Wagon Saloon	Melvins & Amorphous Head	
February 11, 1989	San Jose	United States	Marsugi's	Mudhoney & Vomit Launch	
February 25, 1989	Seattle	United States	HUB Ballroom, University of Washington	Skin Yard, Girl Trouble, The Fluid	
February 26, 1989	Olympia	United States	Dorm K208, Evergreen State College (dorm party)		
April 1, 1989	Olympia	United States	Reko/Muse	Helltrout, S.G.M. & Treehouse *Photo from Bleach cover art is from this show.	
April 7, 1989	Seattle	United States	Annex Theatre	Love Battery	
April 14, 1989	Ellensburg	United States	Hal Holmes Community Center		
April 26, 1989	Seattle	United States	The Vogue	Supporting: The Flaming Lips. Supported by: Steel Pole Bath Tub	100
May 26, 1989	Auburn	United States	Lindbloom Student Center, Green River Community College	Skin Yard & Bible Stud	
June 9, 1989	Seattle	United States	Moore Theatre	Mudhoney & Tad	1,400/1,400
June 10, 1989	Portland	United States	The Blue Gallery	Thrillhammer	
June 16, 1989	Olympia	United States	Reko/Muse		
June 21, 1989	Seattle	United States	The Vogue	Gasoline & Mad Hatter	

== Bleach club tour ==
Date	City	Country	Venue	Other Performers	Attendance
June 22, 1989	San Francisco	United States	Covered Wagon Saloon	Bad Mutha Goose	
June 23, 1989	Los Angeles	United States	Rhino Records		
June 24, 1989	Los Angeles	United States	Al's Bar	Claw Hammer & Stone By Stone	
June 25, 1989	Tempe	United States	Sun Club	Crash Worship & Sun City Girls	
June 27, 1989	Santa Fe	United States	Rockin' T.P.	27 Devils Joking & Monkey Shines	
June 30, 1989	San Antonio	United States	Alfred's	Happy Dogs & Swaziland White Band	
July 1, 1989	Houston	United States	The Axiom	Bayou Pigs & David Von Ohlerking	100
July 2, 1989	Fort Worth	United States	The Axis Club	Dave Daniels Band	
July 3, 1989	Dallas	United States	Electric Jungle		
July 4, 1989	Carbondale	United States	611 Pizza		<10
July 5, 1989	Iowa City	United States	Gabe's Inc.	Blood Circus	10–15
July 6, 1989	Minneapolis	United States	Uptown Bar		
July 7, 1989	Madison	United States	O'Cayz Corral	The Tragically Hip	40
July 8, 1989	Chicago	United States	Club Dreamerz	Precious Wax Drippings	
July 9, 1989	Wilkinsburg	United States	The Sonic Temple, Masonic Temple	Worm Art	20
July 12, 1989	Philadelphia	United States	JC Dobbs	Napalm Sunday	
July 13, 1989	Hoboken	United States	Maxwell's	Tad	
July 15, 1989	Jamaica Plain	United States	Green Street Station	Cheater Slicks & Death of Samantha	
July 18, 1989	New York City	United States	The Pyramid Club (New Music Seminar)	Cows, God Bullies, Lonely Moans & Surgery *Last show with Jason Everman.	
~~July 20, 1989~~	~~Toronto~~	~~Canada~~	TBA		
~~July 21, 1989~~	~~Newport~~	United States	~~Top Hat~~		
~~July 22, 1989~~	~~Detroit~~	United States	~~Garden Bowl @ The Majestic Theatre~~		
~~July 23, 1989~~	~~Champaign~~	United States	~~Trito's Uptown~~		
~~July 26, 1989~~	~~Denver~~	United States	~~The Garage~~		
~~July 28, 1989~~	~~Salt Lake City~~	United States	~~Raunch Records~~		
~~July 29, 1989~~	~~Boise~~	United States	~~The Zoo~~		
~~August 11, 1989~~	~~Anacortes~~	United States	~~Eagles Hall~~		
~~August 12, 1989~~	~~Everett~~	United States	~~Veterans of Foreign War Hall~~		
~~August 13, 1989~~	~~Olympia~~	United States	~~Washington Center for the Performing Arts~~		
August 26, 1989	Seattle	United States	Center on Contemporary Art	The Black Supersuckers, Cat Butt & Mudhoney	
August 28, 1989	Seattle	United States	The Vogue	Dickless & Knife Dance	
September 9, 1989	Chicago	United States	The Cabaret Metro		
September 13, 1989	Englewood	United States	Gothic Theater		
September 26, 1989	Seattle	United States	The Vogue		
September 28, 1989	Minneapolis	United States	Uptown Bar		
~~September 29, 1989~~	~~Milwaukee~~	United States	~~BMU Grill~~	~~The Flaming Lips, Steel Pole Bath Tub~~	
~~September 29, 1989~~	~~Milwaukee~~	United States	~~The Unicorn~~		
September 30, 1989	Chicago	United States	The Cabaret Metro	Eleventh Dream Day	
October 1, 1989	Champaign	United States	Trito's Uptown	Steel Pole Bath Tub	30
October 2, 1989	Kalamazoo	United States	Club Soda	Steel Pole Bath Tub	15–20
October 3, 1989	Ann Arbor	United States	Blind Pig	The Flaming Lips & Steel Pole Bath Tub	
October 6, 1989	Cincinnati	United States	Murphy's Pub	Grinch	
October 7, 1989	Lawrence	United States	The Outhouse	24-7 Spyz & Piston Grind	100–150
October 8, 1989	Omaha	United States	Lifticket Lounge	Mousetrap	20
October 11, 1989	Denver	United States	The Garage	The Fluid	
October 13, 1989	Boulder	United States	Penny Lane Coffeehouse	Dog Bite	10–20
October 14, 1989	Salt Lake City	United States	Speedway Cafe		
October 23, 1989	Newcastle upon Tyne	England	Riverside	The Cataran & Tad	100–150/400
October 24, 1989	Manchester	England	Students' Union, Manchester Polytechnic	The Cataran & Tad	50–100
October 25, 1989	Leeds	England	The Duchess of York	The Cataran & Tad	
~~October 26, 1989~~	~~Reading~~	England	~~Studio 21~~	~~Tad~~	
October 27, 1989	London	England	Students' Union, The School of Oriental and African Studies	The Cataran & Tad	
October 28, 1989	Portsmouth	England	Ents Hall, Portsmouth Polytechnic	The Cataran & Tad	
October 29, 1989	Birmingham	England	Edward's No. 8	Filler & Tad	
October 30, 1989	Norwich	England	The Wilde Club, Norwich Arts Centre	Tad	
November 1, 1989	Hilversum	Netherlands	Villa 65 (Nozems-a-GoGo)		
November 1, 1989	Rotterdam	Netherlands	Nighttown	Tad	66
November 2, 1989	Groningen	Netherlands	Vera	Tad	95
November 3, 1989	Utrecht	Netherlands	Tivoli	Tad	125
November 4, 1989	Apeldoorn	Netherlands	Gigant	Tad	35–50
November 5, 1989	Amsterdam	Netherlands	Melkweg	Tad	200
November 7, 1989	Mönchengladbach	West Germany	B-52	Tad	20
November 8, 1989	Cologne	West Germany	Rose Club	Tad	
November 9, 1989	Hanover	West Germany	Bad	Tad	
November 10, 1989	Enger	West Germany	Forum Enger	Tad	
November 11, 1989	West Berlin	West Germany	Ecstasy	Tad	
November 12, 1989	Oldenburg	West Germany	Kulturzentrum	Tad	
November 13, 1989	Hamburg	West Germany	Fabrik	Tad	
November 15, 1989	Heidelberg	West Germany	Schwimmbad Musik-Club	Tad	
November 16, 1989	Nuremberg	West Germany	Trust	Tad	
November 17, 1989	Gammelsdorf	West Germany	Circus	Tad	
November 18, 1989	Hanau	West Germany	Kultur-Basar	Tad	
November 20, 1989	Linz	Austria	Kapu	Tad	
November 21, 1989	Budapest	Hungary	Petőfi Csarnok	Tad	200
November 22, 1989	Vienna	Austria	U4	Tad	
November 23, 1989	Graz	Austria	Cafe Pi	Tad	7
November 24, 1989	Hohenems	Austria	Konkret	Tad	12
November 25, 1989	Fribourg	Switzerland	Fri-Son	Tad	
November 26, 1989	Mezzago	Italy	Bloom	Tad	
November 27, 1989	Rome	Italy	Piper Club	Tad	
November 29, 1989	Geneva	Switzerland	l'Usine	Tad	
November 30, 1989	Zürich	Switzerland	Rote Fabrik	Tad	
December 1, 1989	Issy-les-Moulineaux	France	Espace Icare	Bloody and Heavy, Tad	
December 2, 1989	Ghent	Belgium	Democrazy	Tad	
December 3, 1989	London	England	London Astoria Lame Fest UK '89	Mudhoney & Tad	
January 6, 1990	Seattle	United States	East Ballroom, Husky Union Building, University of Washington	Crunchbird, The Gits & Tad	
January 12, 1990	Portland	United States	Satyricon	Melvins & Oily Birdman	
January 19, 1990	Olympia	United States	Rignall Hall	Melvins & Beat Happening	
January 20, 1990	Tacoma	United States	Legends	Melvins, Machine & The Rhino Humpers	
February 9, 1990	Portland	United States	Pine Street Theatre	Screaming Trees, Tad, The Legend & Rawhead Rex	
February 11, 1990	San Jose	United States	Cactus Club	Tad, Plastic Jungle & Vegas Voodoo	
February 12, 1990	Sacramento	United States	Cattle Club	Tad & Thornucopia	
February 14, 1990	San Francisco	United States	Rough Trade Records		
February 14, 1990	San Francisco	United States	Kennel Club	Tad, The Legend & Dickless	
February 15, 1990	Los Angeles	United States	Raji's	Tad & Distorted Pony	
February 16, 1990	Long Beach	United States	Bogart's	Tad & Haywire	
February 17, 1990	Tijuana	Mexico	Iguana's	Tad	
February 19, 1990	Phoenix	United States	The Mason Jar	Tad	
February 21, 1990	Chico	United States	Blue Max	Tad & Captain Crunch	25
~~February 27, 1990~~	~~London~~	~~England~~	~~Marquee Club~~		
~~February 28, 1990~~	~~Newcastle~~	~~England~~	~~Riverside~~		
~~March 1, 1990~~	~~Birmingham~~	~~England~~	~~Edward's No.8~~		
March 12, 1990	Vancouver	Canada	The Town Pump	Tad & The Bombshells	
March 20, 1990	Olympia	United States	Evergreen State College		
April 1, 1990	Chicago	United States	Metro Chicago	Bhang Revival & God's Acre	
April 6, 1990	Madison	United States	Club Underground	Tad & Victims Family	
April 8, 1990	Milwaukee	United States	The Unicorn	The Rusty Halos	
April 9, 1990	Minneapolis	United States	First Avenue	Tad & Victims Family	143
April 10, 1990	Ann Arbor	United States	Blind Pig	Tad & Victims Family	
April 16, 1990	Toronto	Canada	Lee's Palace	Rocktopus & Heimlich Maneuver	
April 17, 1990	Montreal	Canada	Les Foufounes Électriques	Huge Groove Experience	
April 18, 1990	Cambridge	United States	Manray	The Bags	
April 20, 1990	Swarthmore	United States	Olde Club, Swarthmore College		25–30
April 21, 1990	Cambridge	United States	Senior House, Massachusetts Institute of Technology	Little Debbie & Slaughter Shack	
April 26, 1990	New York City	United States	Pyramid Club	Barkmarket, Cop Shoot Cop & Rat at Rat R	
April 27, 1990	Amherst	United States	SAGA, Hampshire College	3 Merry Windows, BGOCK!, Cordelia's Dad, GobbleHoof, Mr. Softee, New Radiant Storm King & Sweet Lickin' Honey Babes	
April 28, 1990	Hoboken	United States	Maxwell's	The Jesus Lizard & Sulkweed	
April 29, 1990	Washington, D.C.	United States	9:30 Club	Loop & Thud	
April 30, 1990	Philadelphia	United States	J.C. Dobb's	Raw Ltd.	
May 1, 1990	Chapel Hill	United States	Cat's Cradle		100
May 2, 1990	Charlotte	United States	The Milestone	Eclipse	
May 4, 1990	Tampa	United States	The Masquerade	Forgotten Apostles	
May 5, 1990	Jacksonville Beach	United States	Einstein a Go-Go		
May 6, 1990	Atlanta	United States	The Masquerade		
May 9, 1990	Columbus	United States	Stache's	Barbed Wire Dolls	
May 10, 1990	Cincinnati	United States	Shorty's Underground	National People's Gang	
~~May 11, 1990~~	~~Tulsa~~	United States	~~Mimi's~~		
~~May 12, 1990~~	~~Norman~~	United States	~~Rome XC~~	Angry Son	
May 13, 1990	Lincoln	United States	Duffy's Tavern	Cellophane Ceiling	
May 14, 1990	Denver	United States	The Garage	Jux County	
May 17, 1990	Boise	United States	The Zoo	24-7 Spyz *Last show with Chad Channing.	

== Sliver club tour ==
When Nirvana were interviewed at the Reading Festival in 1991 and asked what the biggest concert they had played before the Reading Festival in 1991 was, bassist Krist Novoselic said that it was supporting Sonic Youth in Los Angeles. This was the August 17, 1990 concert at the Hollywood Palladium which had a capacity of 4,400 people. The band's concerts in the United Kingdom in 1990 were originally intended to promote their new single "Sliver" but the release of the single was delayed in the United Kingdom until January 1991.

Date	City	Country	Venue	Other Performers	Attendance
August 13, 1990	Long Beach	United States	Bogart's	Sonic Youth	
August 15, 1990	West Hollywood	United States	Roxy Theatre	Sonic Youth	
August 16, 1990	Las Vegas	United States	Calamity Jane's Nashville Legends	Sonic Youth & STP *Short tour with Dale Crover on drums.	
August 17, 1990	Los Angeles	United States	Hollywood Palladium	Sonic Youth & STP	
August 19, 1990	San Diego	United States	The Casbah	Chemical People & Granfaloon Bus	
August 20, 1990	Sacramento	United States	Crest Theatre	Sonic Youth & STP	
August 21, 1990	San Francisco	United States	Warfield Theatre	Sonic Youth & STP	
August 23, 1990	Portland	United States	Melody Event Center	Sonic Youth & STP	
August 24, 1990	Seattle	United States	Moore Theatre	Sonic Youth & STP	
August 25, 1990	Vancouver	Canada	York Theater	Sonic Youth & STP	
September 22, 1990	Seattle	United States	Motor Sports International Garage	Melvins, Dwarves & Derelicts *Dan Peters played drums.	1,500
October 11, 1990	Olympia	United States	North Shore Surf Club	Witchypoo *First show with Dave Grohl	300/600–700
October 17, 1990	Olympia	United States	The Mods, Evergreen State College	Seaweed & Unrest	
October 23, 1990	Birmingham	England	Goldwyn's Suite	L7	
October 24, 1990	London	England	London Astoria	L7 & Godflesh	
October 25, 1990	Leeds	England	Leeds Polytechnic	Arm, L7 & Victims Family	
October 26, 1990	Edinburgh	Scotland	Calton Studios	L7, Shonen Knife & The Vaselines	
October 27, 1990	Nottingham	England	Trent Polytechnic	L7 & Shonen Knife	
October 29, 1990	Norwich	England	The Waterfront	L7 & Jacob's Mouse	
November 25, 1990	Seattle	United States	The Off Ramp Cafe	Earth, Heavy Into Jeff & Holy Rollers	
December 31, 1990	Portland	United States	Satyricon	Caustic Soda, Hitting Birth, Roger Music & Thrillhammer	
January 18, 1991	Olympia	United States	Evergreen State College No More Wars Benefit	Fitz of Depression, The Four Squares, Goat Knut, Nubbin & Helltrout	
March 2, 1991	Boise	United States	The Zoo	Anxiety Prophets & Blank Frank & The Tattooed Gods	
March 4, 1991	Calgary	Canada	Westward Club	Skinbarn & Snowman	250–300
March 5, 1991	Edmonton	Canada	The Bronx	Zero Tolerance	
March 8, 1991	Vancouver	Canada	Commodore Ballroom	Doughboys, Mudhoney, Screaming Trees & The Wongs	
March 9, 1991	Victoria	Canada	The Forge	AC/DC Cover Band	
April 17, 1991	Seattle	United States	OK Hotel	Bikini Kill & Fitz of Depression	
May 29, 1991	Los Angeles	United States	Jabberjaw	Fitz of Depression & I Own the Sky	
June 8, 1991	Olympia	United States	The Mods, Evergreen State College (dorm party)		
June 10, 1991	Englewood	United States	Gothic Theatre	Dinosaur Jr. & The Jesus Lizard	
June 11, 1991	Salt Lake City	United States	The Pompadour Rock & Roll Club	Dinosaur Jr.	
June 13, 1991	San Francisco	United States	Warfield Theatre	Dinosaur Jr.	
June 14, 1991	Los Angeles	United States	Hollywood Palladium	Dinosaur Jr. & Hole	
June 15, 1991	Tijuana	Mexico	Iguana's	Dinosaur Jr. & Olivelawn	
June 17, 1991	Sacramento	United States	Crest Theatre	Dinosaur Jr. & Kai Kln	
June 18, 1991	Santa Cruz	United States	The Catalyst	Dinosaur Jr.	
June 20, 1991	Portland	United States	Melody Event Center	Dinosaur Jr. & Treepeople	

== Nevermind club, arena and festival tour ==
Nirvana's major label debut was their second album, Nevermind, which was released on DGC Records in September, 1991. On August 15, 1991, Nirvana played a concert at the Roxy Theatre in West Hollywood, California to showcase the band to the new record company. At the end of the concert fans were invited to appear as extras in the music video that they were filming on the following weekend for the album's first single, "Smells Like Teen Spirit". A notable concert on the Nevermind tour was at Rock City in Nottingham, England, which was filmed by a Japanese TV crew.

Date	City	Country	Venue	Other Performers	Attendance
North America
August 15, 1991	West Hollywood	United States	Roxy Theatre	Wool	
August 17, 1991	Culver City	United States	GMT Studios		
Europe
August 20, 1991	Cork	Ireland	Sir Henry's	Sonic Youth	200–500
August 21, 1991	Dún Laoghaire	Ireland	The Top Hat	Sonic Youth, The Donnelly Brothers, Mexican Pets & Power of Dreams	
August 23, 1991	Reading	England	Little John's Farm	(Reading Festival)	35,000
August 24, 1991	Cologne	Germany	Tanzbrunnen Monsters of Spex	Various Artists	
August 25, 1991	Hasselt	Belgium	Pukkelpop	Various Artists	
August 27, 1991	Bremen	Germany	Aladin Music Hall	Sonic Youth, The Didjits & Gumball	
August 28, 1991	Halle	Germany	Easy Schorre	Sonic Youth	
August 29, 1991	Stuttgart	Germany	LKA Longhorn	Sonic Youth	1,500
August 30, 1991	Nuremberg	Germany	Serenadenhof	Sonic Youth	
September 1, 1991	Rotterdam	Netherlands	De Doelen	(Ein Abend in Wien)	200–300
North America
September 16, 1991	Seattle	United States	Beehive Music & Video	N/A	
September 20, 1991	Toronto	Canada	The Opera House	Melvins	
September 21, 1991	Montreal	Canada	Les Foufounes électriques	Melvins	
September 23, 1991	Boston	United States	Axis Nightclub (WFNX Birthday Bash)	The Smashing Pumpkins, Bullet LaVolta & Cliffs of Dooneen	1,200
September 24, 1991	Boston	United States	Axis Nightclub	N/A	
September 25, 1991	Providence	United States	Club Babyhead	Melvins	
September 26, 1991	New Haven	United States	The Moon	Melvins & Hed	
September 27, 1991	Trenton	United States	Trenton City Gardens	Das Damen & Planet Dread	
September 28, 1991	New York City	United States	Tower Records	N/A	
September 28, 1991	New York City	United States	Marquee	Melvins	
September 30, 1991	Pittsburgh	United States	Graffiti	Das Damen	
October 1, 1991	Philadelphia	United States	JC Dobbs	Das Damen & Love Chunks	
October 2, 1991	Washington, D.C.	United States	9:30 Club	Das Damen & The Legend	
October 4, 1991	Chapel Hill	United States	Cat's Cradle	Das Damen	
October 5, 1991	Athens	United States	40 Watt Club	Das Damen	
October 6, 1991	Atlanta	United States	The Masquerade	Das Damen	
October 7, 1991	Memphis	United States	The New Daisy Theatre	Das Damen	
October 9, 1991	Columbus	United States	Stache's	Urge Overkill	
October 10, 1991	Cleveland	United States	Empire Concert Club	Urge Overkill & Das Damen	
October 11, 1991	Detroit	United States	Saint Andrew's Hall	Urge Overkill	
October 12, 1991	Chicago	United States	Cabaret Metro	Das Damen, House of Freaks, and School of Fish	
October 14, 1991	Minneapolis	United States	Northern Lights Records	N/A	
October 14, 1991	Minneapolis	United States	First Avenue	The Libido Boys & Urge Overkill	1,893
October 16, 1991	St. Louis	United States	Mississippi Nights	Urge Overkill	
October 17, 1991	Lawrence	United States	Kansas Union Ballroom	Paw & Urge Overkill	
October 19, 1991	Dallas	United States	Trees Club	Sister Double Happiness & Thinking Fellers Union Local 282	1,000/1,000
October 20, 1991	Houston	United States	The Vatican	Sister Double Happiness	
October 21, 1991	Austin	United States	Waterloo Records	Sister Double Happiness	
October 21, 1991	Austin	United States	Liberty Lunch	Sister Double Happiness	
October 23, 1991	Tempe	United States	After the Gold Rush	B. Strange & Sister Double Happiness	
October 24, 1991	San Diego	United States	Off The Record	N/A	
October 24, 1991	Tijuana	Mexico	Iguana's	Hole & Sister Double Happiness	
October 25, 1991	Los Angeles	United States	The Hollywood Palace (Rock for Choice Benefit)	Hole, L7 & Sister Double Happiness	
October 26, 1991	San Francisco	United States	Warfield Theatre	L7, Sister Double Happiness & Urge Overkill	2,200/2,200
October 27, 1991	Los Angeles	United States	Palace Theatre	Greg Sage & Hole	
October 29, 1991	Portland	United States	Fox Theatre	Mudhoney & Sprinkler	
October 30, 1991	Vancouver	Canada	Commodore Ballroom	Mudhoney	
October 31, 1991	Seattle	United States	Paramount Theatre	Bikini Kill & Mudhoney	2,800
Europe
~~October 31, 1991~~	~~Groningen~~	~~Netherlands~~	~~Vera~~	N/A	
~~November 1, 1991~~	~~Eindhoven~~	~~Netherlands~~	~~Effenaar~~	N/A	
~~November 2, 1991~~	~~Utrecht~~	~~Netherlands~~	~~Tivoli~~	N/A	
November 4, 1991	Bristol	England	Bierkeller Theatre	Midway Still	700
November 5, 1991	London	England	London Astoria	Captain America & Television Personalities	
November 6, 1991	Wolverhampton	England	Wolverhampton Civic Hall	Captain America	
November 8, 1991	London	England	Limehouse Studios	N/A	
November 10, 1991	Berlin	Germany	Loft	N/A	
November 11, 1991	Hamburg	Germany	Markthalle	N/A	
November 12, 1991	Frankfurt	Germany	Batschkapp	Urge Overkill	
November 13, 1991	Munich	Germany	Nachtwerk	N/A	
November 14, 1991	Vienna	Austria	Arena	Skin Yard	
~~November 15, 1991~~	~~Wels~~	Austria	~~Alter Schlachthof~~	N/A	
November 16, 1991	Muggia	Italy	Teatro Verdi	Urge Overkill	
November 17, 1991	Mezzago	Italy	Bloom	Urge Overkill	
~~November 18, 1991~~	~~Turin~~	Italy	~~Studio 2~~	Urge Overkill	
November 19, 1991	Rome	Italy	Teatro Castello	Urge Overkill	
November 20, 1991	Baricella	Italy	Kryptonight		
November 23, 1991	Ghent	Belgium	Vooruit	Hole	
~~November 24, 1991~~	~~Amsterdam~~	Netherlands	~~Melkweg~~	N/A	
November 25, 1991	Hilversum	Netherlands	NOB Radiostudio	N/A	
November 25, 1991	Amsterdam	Netherlands	Paradiso	N/A	1,300/1,300
November 26, 1991	Bradford	England	Communal Building, University of Bradford	Captain America, Shonen Knife	
November 27, 1991	Borehamwood	England	BBC Elstree Centre (Top of the Pops)	N/A	
November 27, 1991	Birmingham	England	The Hummingbird	Captain America, Shonen Knife	
November 28, 1991	Sheffield	England	Octagon Centre, University of Sheffield	Captain America, Shonen Knife	
November 29, 1991	Edinburgh	Scotland	Calton Studios	Captain America, Shonen Knife	
November 30, 1991	Glasgow	Scotland	Queen Margaret Union, University of Glasgow	Captain America, Shonen Knife	1,400
December 1, 1991	Edinburgh	Scotland	The Southern Bar	The Joyriders	20–30
December 2, 1991	Newcastle upon Tyne	England	The Mayfair	Captain America, Shonen Knife	
December 3, 1991	Nottingham	England	Rock City	Captain America, Shonen Knife	
December 4, 1991	Manchester	England	Manchester Academy	Captain America, Shonen Knife	
December 5, 1991	London	England	Kilburn National Ballroom	Captain America, Shonen Knife	
December 6, 1991	London	England	The Greenwood (Tonight with Jonathan Ross)		
~~December 6, 1991~~	~~Leicester~~	England	~~Leicester Polytechnic~~		
December 7, 1991	Rennes	France	Salle Omnisports (Trans Musicales)	Various Artists	
~~December 9, 1991~~	~~Belfast~~	~~Northern Ireland~~	~~Conor Hall~~	~~The Cranberries~~	
~~December 10, 1991~~	~~Dublin~~	~~Ireland~~	~~McGonagle's~~		
~~December 11, 1991~~	~~Helsinki~~	~~Finland~~	~~Lepakko~~		
~~December 12, 1991~~	~~Bergen~~	~~Norway~~	~~Garage~~		
~~December 13, 1991~~	~~Oslo~~	~~Norway~~	~~Alaska~~		
~~December 14, 1991~~	~~Stockholm~~	~~Sweden~~	~~Melody Club~~		
North America
December 27, 1991	Los Angeles	United States	Los Angeles Memorial Sports Arena	Supporting: Red Hot Chili Peppers. Supported by: Pearl Jam	16,000/16,000
December 28, 1991	Del Mar	United States	Pat O'Brien Pavilion, Del Mar Fairgrounds	Supporting: Red Hot Chili Peppers. Supported by: Pearl Jam	8,000/8,000
December 29, 1991	Tempe	United States	ASU Activity Center	Supporting: Red Hot Chili Peppers. Supported by: Pearl Jam	
December 31, 1991	Daly City	United States	Cow Palace	Supporting: Red Hot Chili Peppers. Supported by: Pearl Jam	16,000/16,000
January 2, 1992	Salem	United States	Salem Armory Auditorium	Supporting: Red Hot Chili Peppers. Supported by: Pearl Jam	
~~January 3, 1992~~	~~Seattle~~	United States	~~Seattle Center Arena~~	~~Supporting: Red Hot Chili Peppers. Supported by: Pearl Jam~~	
~~January 4, 1992~~	~~Vancouver~~	~~Canada~~	~~PNE Forum~~	~~Supporting: Red Hot Chili Peppers. Supported by: Pearl Jam~~	
January 9, 1992	New York City	United States	NBC Studios (Saturday Night Live)	N/A	
January 10, 1992	New York City	United States	MTV Studios	N/A	
January 11, 1992	New York City	United States	NBC Studios (Saturday Night Live)	N/A	
Oceania
January 24, 1992	Sydney	Australia	Phoenician Club	The Meanies & Tumbleweed	1,000/1,000
January 25, 1992	Sydney	Australia	Big Day Out	Various Artists	10,000/10,000
January 26, 1992	Gold Coast	Australia	Fisherman's Wharf	Violent Femmes	10,500–14,000/10,500–14,000
January 27, 1992	Brisbane	Australia	Brisbane Festival Hall	Violent Femmes	
~~January 29, 1992~~	~~Fremantle~~	Australia	~~Metropolis~~		
January 30, 1992	Adelaide	Australia	Thebarton Theatre	The Meanies & Tumbleweed	
January 31, 1992	Melbourne	Australia	The Palace	Guttersnipes & Tumbleweed	
February 1, 1992	Melbourne	Australia	The Palace	The Meanies & Tumbleweed	
February 2, 1992	Melbourne	Australia	The Palace	Cosmic Psychos & Tumbleweed	2,200
~~February 4, 1992~~	~~Sydney~~	Australia	~~Dee Why Hotel~~		
February 5, 1992	Canberra	Australia	Australian National University	Tumbleweed & The Village Idiots	
February 6, 1992	Sydney	Australia	Selina's The Coogee Bay Hotel	Headache & You Am I	3,000/3,000
February 7, 1992	Sydney	Australia	Selina's The Coogee Bay Hotel	Cosmic Psychos, Crow & Nunbait	3,000/3,000
February 9, 1992	Auckland	New Zealand	Logan Campbell Centre	The 3Ds & Second Child	
Asia
February 14, 1992	Osaka	Japan	Kokusai Koryu Center		
February 16, 1992	Nagoya	Japan	Club Quattro		
February 17, 1992	Kawasaki	Japan	Club Citta		
February 19, 1992	Tokyo	Japan	Nakano Sun Plaza		
Oceania
February 21, 1992	Honolulu	United States	Pink's Garage	Mindflower	
February 22, 1992	Honolulu	United States	Pink's Garage	Mindflower	

== Mid-1992 to early-1993 arena, festival and stadium shows ==
Date	City	Country	Venue	Other Performers	Attendance
Europe
June 21, 1992	Dublin	Republic of Ireland	Point Theatre	The Breeders & Teenage Fanclub	8,000/8,000
June 22, 1992	Belfast	Northern Ireland	King's Hall	The Breeders & Teenage Fanclub	
June 24, 1992	Paris	France	Zénith de Paris	Teenage Fanclub	
June 26, 1992	Roskilde	Denmark	Roskilde Festival	Various Artists	64,500–65,000
June 27, 1992	Turku	Finland	Ruisrock	Various Artists	
June 28, 1992	Sandvika	Norway	Kalvoya	Various Artists	20,000
June 30, 1992	Stockholm	Sweden	Sjöhistoriska Museet	Teenage Fanclub	
July 2, 1992	Valencia	Spain	Plaza de Toros de Valencia	~~Surfin' Bichos~~ & Teenage Fanclub	
July 3, 1992	Madrid	Spain	Palacio de Deportes de la Comunidad de Madrid	Teenage Fanclub	
July 4, 1992	Bilbao	Spain	Pabellón de la Casilla	Teenage Fanclub	
~~July 5, 1992~~	~~San Sebastián~~	Spain	~~Velódromo de Anoeta~~	Teenage Fanclub	
United Kingdom
August 30, 1992	Reading	England	Little John's Farm	(Reading Festival)	60,000
North America
September 8, 1992	Los Angeles	United States	Edwin W. Pauley Pavilion	(MTV Video Music Awards)	
September 9, 1992	Los Angeles	United States	Edwin W. Pauley Pavilion	(MTV Video Music Awards)	
September 10, 1992	Portland	United States	Portland Meadows	Poison Idea, Helmet, Calamity Jane	10,000
September 11, 1992	Seattle	United States	Seattle Center Coliseum (Washington Music Industry Coalition Benefit)	Helmet & Fitz of Depression	18,000
September 26, 1992 (Note: Although this was not a Nirvana performance, Kurt Cobain appeared twice during the event, performing "Where Did You Sleep Last Night" as a solo acoustic number and later joining Mudhoney for a rendition of Fang's "The Money Will Roll Right In".)	Valencia	United States	Castaic Lake Natural Amphitheater	Mudhoney, Pavement & Sonic Youth	
October 3, 1992	Bellingham	United States	Carver Gymnasium	Mudhoney, Medelicious & Saucer	3,000/3,000
October 4, 1992	Seattle	United States	Crocodile Cafe	Mudhoney	
South America
October 30, 1992	Buenos Aires	Argentina	Estadio José Amalfitani	Calamity Jane & Los Brujos	20,000 or 50,000 or 50,000–60,000/50,000–60,000
January 16, 1993	São Paulo	Brazil	Estádio do Morumbi	Dr. Sin, Engenheiros do Hawaii, L7 (Hollywood Rock Festival)	50,000 or 80,000 or 100,000 or 80,000–110,000
January 23, 1993	Rio de Janeiro	Brazil	Praça da Apoteose	Dr. Sin, Engenheiros do Hawaii, L7 (Hollywood Rock Festival)	40,000 or 70,000 or 100,000
~~February, 1993~~	~~Santiago~~	Chile	Estadio Nacional Julio Martínez Prádanos	~~Canceled~~	
~~February, 1993~~	~~Bogotá~~	Colombia	Estadio El Campín	~~Canceled~~	

== Mid-1993 intermittent arena shows ==
Date	City	Country	Venue	Other Performers	Attendance
April 9, 1993	Daly City	United States	Cow Palace (Bosnian Rape Victim Benefit)	The Breeders, The Disposable Heroes of Hiphoprisy & L7	12,000
July 23, 1993	New York City	United States	Roseland Ballroom (New Music Seminar)	The Jesus Lizard	3,500
August 6, 1993	Seattle	United States	King Performance Center (Mia Zapata Benefit)	Hell Smells, Kill Sybill, Tad & Voodoo Gearshift	

== In Utero arena tour ==
The first concert on Nirvana's tour for their third and final studio album, In Utero, was on October 18, 1993, at the Arizona Veterans Memorial Coliseum in Phoenix, Arizona. However, on September 25, 1993, the band had performed on television for Saturday Night Live at NBC Studios in New York City. This included a previous rehearsal performance in front of an audience which was the first live appearance of second guitarist Pat Smear in the band. At both the rehearsal performance and the televised performance for Saturday Night Live the band performed the album's first single, "Heart-Shaped Box", along with followup single, "Rape Me". In 1999, this version of "Rape Me" was released as the first track on the compilation album, Saturday Night Live: The Musical Performances Vol. 2. It was also released as a music video on MTV.

Date	City	Country	Venue	Other Performers	Attendance
North America
September 25, 1993	New York City	United States	NBC Studios	*First performance with Pat Smear on second guitar.	
September 25, 1993	New York City	United States	NBC Studios		
October 18, 1993	Phoenix	United States	Arizona Veterans Memorial Coliseum	Mudhoney	15,000/15,000
October 19, 1993	Albuquerque	United States	Albuquerque Convention Center	Jawbreaker & Mudhoney	3,930/3,930
October 21, 1993	Kansas City	United States	Memorial Hall	Jawbreaker & Mudhoney	3,153/3,153
October 22, 1993	Davenport	United States	Palmer Auditorium	Jawbreaker & Mudhoney	4,000/4,000
October 23, 1993	Chicago	United States	Aragon Ballroom	Jawbreaker, Bobcat Goldthwait & Mudhoney	5,000/5,000
October 25, 1993	Chicago	United States	Aragon Ballroom	Jawbreaker, Bobcat Goldthwait & Mudhoney	5,000/5,000
October 26, 1993	Milwaukee	United States	MECCA Arena	Jawbreaker & Mudhoney	
October 27, 1993	Kalamazoo	United States	Wings Stadium	Meat Puppets & Boredoms	4,152/5,200
October 29, 1993	Detroit	United States	Michigan State Fairgrounds Coliseum	Meat Puppets, Bobcat Goldthwait & Boredoms	7,922/7,922
October 30, 1993	Dayton, Ohio	United States	Hara Arena	Meat Puppets & Boredoms	
October 31, 1993	Akron	United States	James A. Rhodes Arena	Meat Puppets & Boredoms	
November 2, 1993	Montreal	Canada	Verdun Auditorium	Meat Puppets & Boredoms	5,204/5,204
November 4, 1993	Toronto	Canada	Maple Leaf Gardens	Meat Puppets & Boredoms	8,500/8,500 or 14,000/14,000
November 5, 1993	Buffalo	United States	Alumni Arena	Meat Puppets & Boredoms	7,500
November 7, 1993	Williamsburg	United States	William & Mary Hall	The Breeders & Half Japanese	
November 8, 1993	Philadelphia	United States	The Armory	The Breeders & Half Japanese	4,500/4,500
November 9, 1993	Bethlehem	United States	Stabler Arena	The Breeders & Half Japanese	5,254/5,254
November 10, 1993	Springfield	United States	Springfield Civic Center	The Breeders & Half Japanese	
November 12, 1993	Fitchburg	United States	Wallace Civic Center	The Breeders & Half Japanese	
November 13, 1993	Washington, D.C.	United States	Bender Arena	The Breeders & Half Japanese	5,200/5,200
November 14, 1993	New York City	United States	New York Coliseum	The Breeders & Half Japanese	8,000/8,000
November 15, 1993	New York City	United States	Roseland Ballroom	The Breeders & Half Japanese	
November 16, 1993	Weehawken, NJ	United States	SST Rehearsal Facility	N/A	
November 17, 1993	Weehawken, NJ	United States	SST Rehearsal Facility	N/A	
November 18, 1993	New York City	United States	Sony Music Studios	N/A	
November 26, 1993	Jacksonville	United States	Morocco Shrine Auditorium	The Breeders & Come	3,500/3,500
November 27, 1993	Miami	United States	AT&T Bayfront Park Amphitheater	The Breeders & Come	8,807/8,807
November 28, 1993	Lakeland	United States	Lakeland Civic Center	The Breeders & Come	
November 29, 1993	Atlanta	United States	Omni Coliseum	The Breeders & Come	
December 1, 1993	Birmingham	United States	Boutwell Memorial Auditorium	The Breeders & Come	5,181/5,181
December 2, 1993	Tallahassee	United States	Tallahassee–Leon County Civic Center	The Breeders & Come	
December 3, 1993	New Orleans	United States	Lakefront Arena	The Breeders & Shonen Knife	5,806/5,806
December 5, 1993	Dallas	United States	Fair Park Coliseum	The Breeders & Shonen Knife	
December 6, 1993	Houston	United States	Astroarena	The Breeders & Shonen Knife	3,000 or 4,500 or 6,000/8,000
December 8, 1993	Oklahoma City	United States	Travel and Transportation Building	The Breeders & Shonen Knife	6,500
December 9, 1993	Omaha	United States	Ak-Sar-Ben Coliseum	The Breeders & Shonen Knife	4,500/4,500
December 10, 1993	Saint Paul	United States	Roy Wilkins Auditorium	The Breeders & Shonen Knife	5,500/5,500
December 13, 1993	Seattle	United States	Central Waterfront (MTV Live and Loud)	The Breeders & Cypress Hill	2,000
December 14, 1993	Salem	United States	Salem Armory Auditorium	The Breeders & Melvins	3,400/3,400
December 15, 1993	Boise	United States	BSU Pavilion	The Breeders & Melvins	3,954/6,000
December 16, 1993	Ogden	United States	Golden Spike Arena	The Breeders & Melvins	
December 18, 1993	Denver	United States	Denver Coliseum	The Breeders & Melvins	5,000
December 29, 1993	San Diego	United States	San Diego Sports Arena	Butthole Surfers, Bobcat Goldthwait & Chokebore	7,419/10,176
December 30, 1993	Inglewood	United States	Great Western Forum	Butthole Surfers, Bobcat Goldthwait & Chokebore	13,186/13,186
December 31, 1993	Oakland	United States	Oakland–Alameda County Coliseum Arena	Butthole Surfers, Bobcat Goldthwait & Chokebore	19,000
January 1, 1994	Central Point	United States	Compton Arena	Butthole Surfers, Bobcat Goldthwait & Chokebore	5,048/5,048
January 3, 1994	Vancouver	Canada	PNE Forum	Butthole Surfers, Bobcat Goldthwait & Chokebore	4,000
January 4, 1994	Vancouver	Canada	PNE Forum	Butthole Surfers, Bobcat Goldthwait & Chokebore	
January 6, 1994	Spokane	United States	Spokane Coliseum	Butthole Surfers & Chokebore	
January 7, 1994	Seattle	United States	Seattle Center Arena	Butthole Surfers & Chokebore	
January 8, 1994	Seattle	United States	Seattle Center Arena	Butthole Surfers, Bobcat Goldthwait & Chokebore	
Europe
February 4, 1994	Paris	France	Canal+	N/A	
February 6, 1994	Cascais	Portugal	Pavilhão de Cascais	Buzzcocks	
February 8, 1994	Madrid	Spain	Pabellón de la Ciudad Deportiva del Real Madrid	Buzzcocks	
February 9, 1994	Barcelona	Spain	Palau dels Esports de Barcelona	Buzzcocks	
February 10, 1994	Toulouse	France	Palais des Sports	Buzzcocks	
February 12, 1994	Toulon	France	Zénith Oméga	Buzzcocks	
February 14, 1994	Paris	France	Zénith Paris	Buzzcocks	6,000–8,000
~~February 15, 1994~~	Paris	France	~~Espace Reuilly~~	Buzzcocks	
February 16, 1994	Rennes	France	Salle Omnisports	Buzzcocks	
February 18, 1994	Grenoble	France	Summum	Buzzcocks	
February 19, 1994	Neuchâtel	Switzerland	Patinoire du Littoral	Les Thugs	7,000
February 21, 1994	Modena	Italy	Palasport	Melvins & Flor de Mal	
February 22, 1994	Marino	Italy	Palaghiaccio di Marino	Melvins & Flor de Mal	
February 23, 1994	Rome	Italy	RAI Centro di Produzione TV Studi Nomentano (Tunnel)	N/A	
February 24, 1994	Milan	Italy	PalaTrussardi	Melvins	
February 25, 1994	Milan	Italy	PalaTrussardi	Melvins	
February 27, 1994	Ljubljana	Slovenia	Tivoli Hall	Melvins	
March 1, 1994	Munich	Germany	Terminal 1, Flughafen München-Riem	Melvins	3,000
~~March 2, 1994~~	Munich	Germany	Terminal 1, Flughafen München-Riem	Melvins	
~~March 3, 1994~~	~~Offenbach am Main~~	Germany	~~Stadthalle~~	Melvins	
~~March 11, 1994~~	~~Prague~~	~~Czech Republic~~	~~Průmyslový palác~~	Meat Puppets	
~~March 13, 1994~~	~~Böblingen~~	~~Germany~~	~~Sporthalle~~		
~~March 14, 1994~~	~~Cologne~~	~~Germany~~	~~Sporthalle~~		
~~March 15, 1994~~	~~Berlin~~	~~Germany~~	~~Die Halle~~		
~~March 17, 1994~~	~~Hanover~~	~~Germany~~	~~Musikhalle~~	Meat Puppets	
~~March 18, 1994~~	~~Hamburg~~	~~Germany~~	~~Alsterdorfer Sporthalle~~		
~~March 19, 1994~~	~~Copenhagen~~	~~Denmark~~	~~Falkonersalen~~		
~~March 21, 1994~~	~~Stockholm~~	~~Sweden~~	~~Hovet~~	The Auteurs	
~~March 24, 1994~~	~~Rotterdam~~	~~Netherlands~~	~~Ahoy Rotterdam~~	The Auteurs	
~~March 25, 1994~~	~~Brussels~~	~~Belgium~~	~~Forest National~~		
~~March 27, 1994~~	~~Manchester~~	~~England~~	~~G-Mex Centre~~	The Raincoats, Sebadoh	
~~March 28, 1994~~	~~Glasgow~~	~~Scotland~~	~~Scottish Exhibition and Conference Centre~~	The Raincoats, Sebadoh	
~~March 30, 1994~~	~~Birmingham~~	~~England~~	~~Aston Villa Leisure Centre~~	The Raincoats, Sebadoh	
~~March 31, 1994~~	~~Birmingham~~	~~England~~	~~Aston Villa Leisure Centre~~	The Raincoats, Sebadoh	
~~April 1, 1994~~	~~Cardiff~~	~~Wales~~	~~Cardiff International Arena~~	The Raincoats, Sebadoh	
~~April 3, 1994~~	~~London~~	~~England~~	~~Brixton Academy~~	The Raincoats, Sebadoh	
~~April 4, 1994~~	~~London~~	~~England~~	~~Brixton Academy~~	The Raincoats, Sebadoh	
~~April 5, 1994~~	~~London~~	~~England~~	~~Brixton Academy~~	Buzzcocks, Sebadoh	
~~April 6, 1994~~	~~London~~	~~England~~	~~Brixton Academy~~	Buzzcocks, Sebadoh	
~~April 8, 1994~~	~~Dublin~~	~~Ireland~~	~~RDS Simmonscourt~~	The Raincoats, Sebadoh	

== 1994 festival and stadium shows ==
In mid-1994, Nirvana were scheduled to headline the Lollapalooza festival which was then a touring festival across the United States and Canada. However, the band pulled out from the tour because singer and lead guitarist, Kurt Cobain, felt that they would be selling out. He had reportedly been offered nearly $10 million to do it. On April 6, 1994, which was two days before Cobain was found dead, having committed suicide, Nirvana announced that they were pulling out of the tour because they were concerned for Cobain's health.

Date	City	Country	Venue	Other Performers
~~July 7, 1994~~	~~Las Vegas~~	~~United States~~	~~Sam Boyd Stadium (Lollapalooza)~~	
~~July 9, 1994~~	~~Greenwood Village, Colorado~~	~~United States~~	~~Fiddler's Green Amphitheatre (Lollapalooza)~~	
~~July 11, 1994~~	~~Bonner Springs, Kansas~~	~~United States~~	~~Sandstone Amphitheater (Lollapalooza)~~	
~~July 12, 1994~~	~~Saint Paul, Minnesota~~	~~United States~~	~~Harriet Island Regional Park (Lollapalooza)~~	
~~July 14, 1994~~	~~Milwaukee~~	~~United States~~	~~Marcus Amphitheater (Lollapalooza)~~	
~~July 15, 1994~~	~~Tinley Park, Illinois~~	~~United States~~	~~World Music Theatre (Lollapalooza)~~	
~~July 16, 1994~~	~~Tinley Park, Illinois~~	~~United States~~	~~World Music Theatre (Lollapalooza)~~	
~~July 17, 1994~~	~~Maryland Heights, Missouri~~	~~United States~~	~~Riverport Amphitheater (Lollapalooza)~~	
~~July 19, 1994~~	~~Columbus, Ohio~~	~~United States~~	~~Polaris Amphitheater (Lollapalooza)~~	
~~July 20, 1994~~	~~Cincinnati~~	~~United States~~	~~Riverbend Music Center (Lollapalooza)~~	
~~July 22, 1994~~	~~Noblesville, Indiana~~	~~United States~~	~~Deer Creek Music Amphitheatre (Lollapalooza)~~	
~~July 23, 1994~~	~~Clarkston, Michigan~~	~~United States~~	~~Pine Knob Music Theatre (Lollapalooza)~~	
~~July 24, 1994~~	~~Clarkston, Michigan~~	~~United States~~	~~Pine Knob Music Theatre (Lollapalooza)~~	
~~July 25, 1994~~	~~Clarkston, Michigan~~	~~United States~~	~~Pine Knob Music Theatre (Lollapalooza)~~	
~~July 27, 1994~~	~~Montreal~~	~~Canada~~	~~Le Parc Des Iles (Lollapalooza)~~	
~~July 28, 1994~~	~~Barrie~~	~~Canada~~	~~Molson Park (Lollapalooza)~~	
~~July 29, 1994~~	~~Clarkston, Michigan~~	~~United States~~	~~Pine Knob Music Theatre (Lollapalooza)~~	
~~July 30, 1994~~	~~Burgettstown, Pennsylvania~~	~~United States~~	~~Star Lake Amphitheater (Lollapalooza)~~	
~~August 1, 1994~~	~~Philadelphia~~	~~United States~~	~~Franklin Delano Roosevelt Park (Lollapalooza)~~	
~~August 2, 1994~~	~~Saratoga Springs, New York~~	~~United States~~	~~Saratoga Raceway (Lollapalooza)~~	
~~August 3, 1994~~	~~North Kingstown, Rhode Island~~	~~United States~~	~~Quonset State Airport (Lollapalooza)~~	
~~August 5, 1994~~	~~New York City~~	~~United States~~	~~Downing Stadium (Lollapalooza)~~	
~~August 6, 1994~~	~~New York City~~	~~United States~~	~~Downing Stadium (Lollapalooza)~~	
~~August 8, 1994~~	~~Charles Town, West Virginia~~	~~United States~~	~~Charles Town Races (Lollapalooza)~~	
~~August 10, 1994~~	~~Raleigh, North Carolina~~	~~United States~~	~~Walnut Creek Amphitheater (Lollapalooza)~~	
~~August 11, 1994~~	~~Charlotte, North Carolina~~	~~United States~~	~~Blockbuster Pavilion (Lollapalooza)~~	
~~August 12, 1994~~	~~Atlanta~~	~~United States~~	~~Lakewood Amphitheater (Lollapalooza)~~	
~~August 13, 1994~~	~~Atlanta~~	~~United States~~	~~Lakewood Amphitheater (Lollapalooza)~~	
~~August 15, 1994~~	~~Miami~~	~~United States~~	~~Bicentennial Park (Lollapalooza)~~	
~~August 16, 1994~~	~~DeLand, Florida~~	~~United States~~	~~Volusia County Fairgrounds (Lollapalooza)~~	
~~August 18, 1994~~	~~New Orleans~~	~~United States~~	~~Soccer Field, University of New Orleans (Lollapalooza)~~	
~~August 19, 1994~~	~~Baytown, Texas~~	~~United States~~	~~Houston Raceway Park (Lollapalooza)~~	
~~August 20, 1994~~	~~Dallas~~	~~United States~~	~~Starplex Amphitheater (Lollapalooza)~~	
~~August 21, 1994~~	~~Dallas~~	~~United States~~	~~Starplex Amphitheater (Lollapalooza)~~	
~~August 24, 1994~~	~~Phoenix, Arizona~~	~~United States~~	~~Desert Sky Pavilion (Lollapalooza)~~	
~~August 25, 1994~~	~~San Diego County, California~~	~~United States~~	~~Aztec Bowl (Lollapalooza)~~	
~~August 27, 1994~~	~~Mountain View, California~~	~~United States~~	~~Shoreline Amphitheatre (Lollapalooza)~~	
~~August 28, 1994~~	~~Mountain View, California~~	~~United States~~	~~Shoreline Amphitheatre (Lollapalooza)~~	
~~August 30, 1994~~	~~Surrey, British Columbia~~	~~United States~~	~~Cloverdale Raceway (Lollapalooza)~~	
~~August 31, 1994~~	~~George, Washington~~	~~United States~~	~~The Gorge Amphitheatre (Lollapalooza)~~	
~~September 1, 1994~~	~~George, Washington~~	~~United States~~	~~The Gorge Amphitheatre (Lollapalooza)~~	
~~September 4, 1994~~	~~Carson, California~~	~~United States~~	~~Velodrome Field, Dominguez Hills (Lollapalooza)~~	
~~September 5, 1994~~	~~Carson, California~~	~~United States~~	~~Velodrome Field, Dominguez Hills (Lollapalooza)~~	
