= Lynn Truell =

American musician

Lynn Perko-Truell
- Born: Lynn Elise Perko; 1964 (age 61–62); Palo Alto, California
- Origin: San Francisco, California
- Genres: Punk rock, indie rock, grunge, hardcore punk
- Occupations: Musician, drummer
- Instruments: Drums, Vocal, piano, percussion, bass guitar, keyboards
- Years active: 1980–present
- Labels: Slash, London, Reprise, Subpop, Merge, Alternative Tentacles, SST

Lynn Perko-Truell is an American musician, best known as the drummer, bass guitarist, and co-singer for the San Francisco indie rock band Imperial Teen. She is also known as the drummer for the San Francisco-based blues grunge band Sister Double Happiness, and the San Francisco version of the hardcore punk band The Dicks. Perko-Truell was an iconic figure and a pioneering female in the American hardcore punk and alternative rock movements of the 1980s and 1990s and remains active.

== Career ==
=== The Wrecks ===
In 1980 at the age of 16 Perko took up the drums and joined the all-girl punk band the Wrecks with Helen Johnson, Bessie Oakely, and Joan Stebbins. They performed locally and regionally. They supported touring punk bands such as Black Flag, TSOL, D.O.A., and 7 Seconds. Their last show was July 4, 1982, at the Vancouver Community Center opening for Black Flag and Saccharine Trust. They had one self-released cassette, Teenage Jive, and appeared on the Not So Quiet On The Western Front compilation (Alternative Tentacles).

=== The Dicks ===
Perko moved to San Francisco in 1982 and met Gary Floyd, singer of the punk band The Dicks, which had formerly been based in Austin, Texas. In 1983, Gary started a San Francisco-based version of The Dicks and invited Lynn to try out. This new version of the Dicks became a popular band in the SF punk scene. They also toured nationally multiple times with D.O.A, and fellow SF band MDC. One of the most prominent shows was playing outside the 1984 Democratic National Convention with the Dead Kennedys. With the Dicks Perko recorded one album on Alternative Tentatles and one single on R Radical Records, which included the anti-war anthem "No Fucking War""

=== Sister Double Happiness ===
Perko and Gary Floyd formed Sister Double Happiness in 1985 with Benjamin Cohen and Mikey Donaldson. They favored an alternative hard-rock blues sound and quickly became one of the most popular bands in San Francisco. They did multiples US tours both as headliners and as support for other prominent alternative bands (Nirvana, Dinosaur Jr., The Mighty Lemon Drops, L7, and Soundgarden, The Replacements, 4 Non Blondes). They were also well received in Europe where they did several tours and released one live concert video from Zurich, Switzerland. Their last performance was in 1996.

=== Imperial Teen ===
Towards the end of the Sister Double Happiness, Perko formed a band with her long-time friend Roddy Bottum of Faith No More, It also included Jone Stebbins from her previous band the Wrecks and Will Schwartz. Imperial Teen remains active and have released six studio LPs, one live LP and numerous singles. They toured with The Lemonheads, Hole, The Breeders, The Amps, Pink and The Go-Gos. Imperial Teen is perhaps best known for their single "Yoo Hoo", used in the 1999 film Jawbreaker.

== Awards and recognition ==
Perko-Truell was nominated multiple times for Best Drummer at the Bay Area and California Music Awards. She was named one of the top 100 drums of alternative rock by Spin magazine.

== Personal life ==
Perko-Truell was raised in Palo Alto, Seattle, Los Angeles, and Miami. She moved to Reno, Nevada at the age of 13 where she would eventually join her first band. She currently resides in Denver, Colorado.

== Discography ==
=== Studio albums ===
==== The Wrecks ====
- Teenage Jive Cassette, 1982, self released

==== The Dicks ====
- These People LP (1985), Alternative Tentacles
- 1980-1986 CD (1997), Alternative Tentacles (compilation of out of print material)

==== Sister Double Happiness ====
- Sister Double Happiness LP, SST, 1988
- Heart and Mind LP, Reprise, 1991
- Uncut LP, Warner Chapel Music, 1993 (reissued on Dutch East India Trading)
- Horsey Water LP, Sub-Pop, 1994

==== Imperial Teen ====
- Seasick — 1996
- What Is Not to Love — 1998
- On — 2002
- The Hair the TV the Baby & the Band — 2007
- Feel the Sound — 2012
- Now We Are Timeless — 2019
- All Over You - 2026

=== Live albums ===
==== Sister Double Happiness ====
- A Stone's Throw from Love (Live and Acoustic at the Great American Music Hall 06/17/92), Innerstate, 1999

==== Imperial Teen ====
- Live at Maxwell's — 2002

=== Singles and EPs ===
==== The Dicks ====
- Peace? 7-inch EP (1984), R Radical Records: "No Fuckin' War"/"I Hope You Get Drafted"/"Nobody Asked Me"

==== Frightwig ====
- Phonesexy EP (1990; Boner Records)

==== Sister Double Happiness ====
- Don't Worry (Vinyl 45 EP Sub Pop, 1990
- Hey Kids Maxi Single, Reprise, 1992
- Sister Double Happiness EP, Warner Chapel Music, 1993 (reissued on Dutch East India Trading)

==== Imperial Teen ====
- Imperial Teen — (Vinyl 45 EP) 1996 — (Imperial Teen, Waterboy, Shayla)
- You're One — (Vinyl 45 EP) 1996 — (Waterboy, Pretty, You're One)
- Butch — 1996 — Various CD Singles, Promos, and 45's. Shayla may be a b-side on one of them
- Sweet and Touching — (Vinyl 45 EP) (1998) — (Ivanka, Sweet and Touching)

=== Songs on compilations ===
==== The Wrecks ====
- Not So Quiet on the Western Front - 1982, Alternative Tentacles

==== The Dicks ====
- "I Hope You Get Drafted" on the International P.E.A.C.E. Benefit Compilation (1984), R Radical Records
- "Legacy of Man" on Rat Music for Rat People Vol. 2 (1984), CD Presents, Ltd

==== Sister Double Happiness ====
- Where the Pyramid Meets the Eye: A Tribute to Roky Erickson (1990, Sire Records/Warner Bros. Records)
- Virus 100 1991 (Alternative Tentacles)

==== Imperial Teen ====
- Jawbreaker Movie Soundtrack — 1999 — ('Yoo Hoo', originally on "What is Not to Love")
- Ten Years Of Noise Pop 1993 - 2002 — 2002 — ('The Beginning', originally on "What is Not to Love")
- Merge Records Presents Survive And Advance, Volume 1 — 2002 — ('Sugar', originally on "On")
- Old Enough To Know Better — 2004 — ('Ivanka', originally from "On")
