= Takiko Fukuda =

Japanese stage performer and tarento (born 1984)

- 福田 多希子
- Born: 25 July 1984 (age 41); Tenri, Nara, Japan
- Occupation: Actress
- Spouse: Ponta Dohi (m. 2017)

Takiko Fukuda (福田 多希子, Fukuda Takiko; born 25 July 1984, in Nara Prefecture) is a Japanese stage performer and tarento. She is represented with Yoshimoto Creative Agency in Osaka. Her husband is Ponta Dohi.

== Filmography ==
=== Internet videos ===
Former

Title	Website	Notes
Tsubomi no Niconico Land	Niconico	Wednesday, later Friday starring
Motto! Inagakisaki Sakura	Niconico	Occasional appearances
Zawazawa Revolution	Niconico	Occasional appearances; collaborated with Naoko Okada, senior of Yoshimoto Shinkigeki

Current

Title	Website	Notes
Zawazawa Evolution	Niconico	Occasional appearances

=== Television ===
Current

Title	Network
Yoshimoto Shinkigeki	MBS

Former

Title	Network	Notes
Roke mitsu: Friday	MBS	Occasional appearances

=== Radio ===
Former

Dates	Title	Network	Notes
2, 19 May 2011	Yoshimoto*chatterbox!	Yes-fm	Guest appearance
	Radio Yoshimoto: Mutcha Genki Super!	Radio Osaka	Monday assistant

=== DVD ===
Date	Title
9 Feb 2011	Tsubomi no Kaika Sengen!! –Hajimete no DVD Ganbari mashita!–

=== Stage ===
Date	Title	Location
16 May 2010	Yoshimoto Rookies Cup	Yoshimoto Mugendai Hall Osaka
12 Jun 2010	Yoshimoto Rookies Cup: Final Stage	Yoshimoto Mugendai Hall Osaka
13 Jun 2010	King of Conte 2010: 1-Kaisen	Yoshimoto Mugendai Hall Osaka
8 Aug 2010	King of Conte 2010: 2-Kaisen	Osaka Conference Center
12 Jul 2011	King of Conte 2011: 1-Kaisen	Yoshimoto Mugendai Hall Osaka
6 Aug 2011	King of Conte 2011: 2-Kaisen	Yoshimoto Mugendai Hall Osaka
21 Sep 2011	Kyōbashi Dodōn to Neta matsuri! (Nihon Ningyō)	Kyobashi Kagetsu
