= Live at Maxwell's =

Live album by indie rock band Imperial Teen

Live album by Imperial Teen
- Released: October 22, 2002
- Recorded: July 31, 2002, Maxwell's, Hoboken, New Jersey, United States
- Genre: Indie rock
- Length: 46:22
- Label: DCN Records

Imperial Teen chronology
On (2002)	Live at Maxwell's (2002)	The Hair the TV the Baby & the Band (2007)

Professional ratings
Review scores
Source	Rating
AllMusic	3/5 stars
Rolling Stone	3/5 stars
Pitchfork	(7.2/10)
Robert Christgau	(2-star Honorable Mention)

Live at Maxwell's is the first live album by indie rock band Imperial Teen. The album was recorded on July 31, 2002 at Maxwell's in Hoboken, New Jersey. It was released between their third studio record On (2002), and their fourth studio record The Hair the TV the Baby and the Band (2007), and was released in the U.S. on October 22, 2002 from DCN Records.

== Track listing ==
1. "The Beginning" - 2:38
2. "Ivanka" - 3:19
3. "Our Time" - 2:23
4. "Butch" - 4:28
5. "Sugar" - 3;32
6. "Yoo-Hoo" - 4:01
7. "Baby" - 3:00
8. "City Song" - 2:34
9. "Lipstick" - 5:26
10. "Birthday Girl" - 3:56
11. "Teacher's Pet" - 3:25
12. "You're One" - 3:38
13. "Balloon" - 4:02
