= Imperial Teen =

American indie pop group

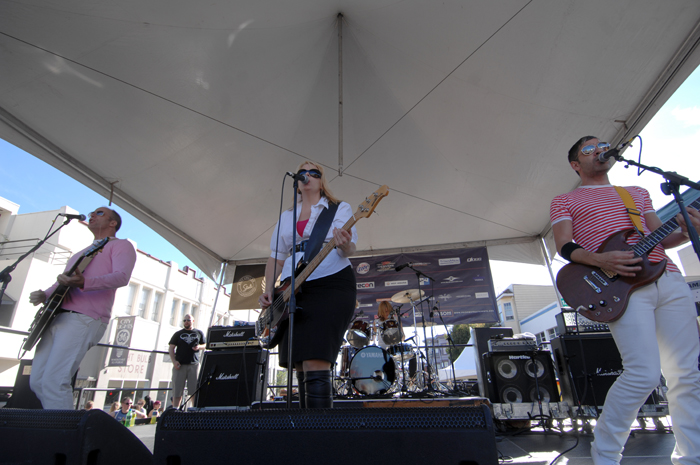
- Imperial Teen in 2007

Background information
- Also known as: Star 69
- Origin: San Francisco, California, U.S.
- Genres: Indie pop, alternative rock
- Years active: 1996–present
- Label: Merge
- Members: Roddy Bottum; Will Schwartz; Jone Stebbins; Lynn Truell
- Website: imperialteen.com

Imperial Teen is an American San Francisco–based indie pop group made up of Roddy Bottum (Faith No More), primarily on guitar/vocals; Will Schwartz (also of Hey Willpower), primarily on guitar/vocals; Lynn Truell (née Perko, formerly of Sister Double Happiness, the Dicks, and the Wrecks), primarily on drums and backing vocals; and Jone Stebbins (previously of the Wrecks), primarily on bass and backing vocals. Imperial Teen became known for its boy–girl harmonies and for all four members switching instruments during shows.

== History ==
Imperial Teen first gained notice with its debut album, Seasick, in 1996, which was produced by Steve McDonald (Redd Kross). Spin magazine went on to list it as the fourth-best album of the year and in the top 50 albums of all time. Of the "queer alt-rockers Imperial Teen", one New York Times reviewer wrote that "though every song on the album is good, the best are the ones about homosexuality ('Butch'), Kurt Cobain ('You're One'), and complete nonsense ('Imperial Teen')". "You're One" was the album's breakout single, receiving heavy radio play on alternative stations; a promotional video was also produced for the song. Prior to the debut album's release, the band was called Star 69, but was forced to change the name after a band from New York threatened to sue.

The band's second album, What Is Not to Love, was released in 1998 and expanded the three-minute pop of Seasick with songs of over six minutes in length. A Rolling Stone review of the album said that "Imperial Teen still have this turf all to themselves, and they blast through the bubblegum riffs of 'Birthday Girl', 'Year of the Tan' and 'Lipstick'". Its single "Yoo Hoo" appeared on the soundtrack to Jawbreaker, starring Rose McGowan; McGowan also appeared alongside the band in the video for the song, which was included on the Jawbreaker DVD. To add authenticity to a parody scene in Not Another Teen Movie, "Yoo Hoo" is heard briefly during Jaime Pressly's slow-motion entrance. "Yoo Hoo" was also heard at the beginnings of the Numbers season 4 episode "Black Swan" and the Daria season 3 episode "Daria Dance Party".

The band toured throughout these years, and its success led to opening several dates in 1998 for Hole, fronted by Courtney Love, a friend and (briefly) former Faith No More bandmate of Roddy Bottum. Imperial Teen was also slated to be the opening act for one leg of the 1999 Marilyn Manson–Hole co-headlined Beautiful Monsters Tour, but the tour ended after only a few March dates when Hole dropped out and Manson had to postpone dates due to an ankle injury. Imperial Teen ended up headlining a club tour instead.

A 1999 article in The Advocate said of the band, "With lyrical allusions to wearing lipstick and male pronouns used to address love objects, Imperial Teen serves up a gay sensibility that ordinarily surfaces only from straight bands like Pulp or Pizzicato Five." Bottum (who came out as gay in 1993) noted, "I think there's a resistance from gay artists to go that route just because it's so predictable. But it is annoying to see bands play it as safe as they do these days. That's why something that visually screams as loud as Marilyn Manson is such a breath of fresh air."

Issues with support levels and label restructuring at Universal Records prompted Imperial Teen to switch to Merge Records for the 2002 release of its third album, On, which was produced by Steve McDonald (again) and Anna Waronker (of That Dog). The lead track, "Ivanka" (originally released on the Sweet and Touching 7-inch), received radio play. The song also appeared on the soundtrack for the 2003 film Thirteen. Imperial Teen toured with the Breeders in 2002 in support of the album. On July 31, 2002, the band played a gig at Maxwell's in Hoboken, New Jersey, that was recorded for posterity and released three months later as the CD Live at Maxwell's.

Will Schwartz joined with Tomo Yasuda for his dance side project Hey Willpower. The outfit, also including dancers Erin Rush and Justin Kelly, released a self-titled EP in 2005.

Imperial Teen returned on the live scene with two shows at the South by Southwest music festival in March 2007. The band released its first album in five years, The Hair the TV the Baby and the Band, in late August 2007 on Merge Records. It was later selected as the 38th-best record of 2007 by Rolling Stone magazine.

The band's fifth studio album, Feel the Sound, was released on January 31, 2012.

Jone Stebbins said in a 2017 interview that the band was preparing material for a sixth studio album, although the process is slowed down by their living far apart from one another. Roddy Bottum revealed in late 2018 that he was mixing a new Imperial Teen album. The album was released by Merge Records in June 2019, titled Now We Are Timeless. After seven years, Imperial Teen released their seventh studio album, All Over You on October 9, 2026.

== Discography ==
=== Studio albums ===
- Seasick (1996)
- What Is Not to Love (1998)
- On (2002)
- The Hair the TV the Baby & the Band (2007)
- Feel the Sound (2012)
- Now We Are Timeless (2019)
- All Over You (2026)

=== Live albums ===
- Live at Maxwell's (2002)

=== Singles and EPs ===
- Imperial Teen (1996) – vinyl 45
- You're One (1996) – vinyl 45
- "Butch" (1996) – various CD singles, promos, and 45s
- Sweet and Touching (date unknown) – vinyl 45

=== Songs on compilations ===
- "Balloon (Remix)" on American Eagle Outfitters: Spring Music compilation (1997)
- "Yoo Hoo" on the Jawbreaker Movie Soundtrack (1999)
- "The Beginning" on Ten Years of Noise Pop 1993–2002 (2002)
- "Sugar" on Merge Records Presents Survive and Advance, Volume 1 (2002)
- "Freaks" on Wig in a Box: Songs from & Inspired by Hedwig and the Angry Inch (2003)
- "Ivanka" on Old Enough to Know Better (2004)
