= Will Schwartz =

American pop musician

- Origin: San Francisco, California
- Genres: Indie pop, indie rock, alternative rock, EDM
- Instrument: Guitar
- Years active: 1996 - present
- Labels: Merge Records, Cochon Records

Will Schwartz is an American pop musician. He is a member of the bands Imperial Teen, whose debut album Seasick was released in 1996, and hey willpower.

Of the "queer alt-rockers Imperial Teen," one New York Times reviewer wrote that "though every song on the album is good, the best are the ones about homosexuality ("Butch"), Kurt Cobain ("You're One") and complete nonsense ("Imperial Teen")".

In July 2003, Schwartz and Tomo Yasuda created a dance pop project called hey willpower. hey willpower released the EP hey willpower in 2005, and the LP PDA in 2006.

Imperial Teen's latest album, Now We Are Timeless, was released in 2019. Schwartz remains active with both bands.
