= Hey Willpower =

American pop band

hey willpower
- Also known as: willpower, Hey Willpower
- Origin: San Francisco, California
- Genres: Dance, pop, R&B, crunk
- Instrument: Electronic
- Years active: 2003–present
- Labels: Cochon Records (US); Tomlab (Europe)
- Members: Will Schwartz; Tomo Yasuda; Justin Kelly; Mecca; Hayley Kaufmann; Joey Guillory
- Past members: Erin Rush; Donal Mosher; Chelsea Starr; Christelle
- Website: http://www.heywillpower.com/

Hey Willpower (styled hey willpower) is an American pop band, led by vocalist Will Schwartz and electronic musician Tomo Yasuda (usually known simply as "Tomo"), with rotating collaborators including musicians and dancers.

== History ==
hey willpower was formed by Will Schwartz (one of the "queer alt-rockers" of Imperial Teen) and San Francisco musician Tomo Yasuda (of The Boy Explodes), under the name willpower in San Francisco during July 2003. They had to change their name to hey willpower by December 2004 after receiving a cease and desist order from an artist called Will Power. Schwartz started the project to explore his interest in dance pop and R&B music, which he had no outlet for in his other band.

Schwartz and Tomo began gigging in the San Francisco area in late 2003, eventually launching US and then European tours. The pair recruited dancers to liven up their shows; first Donal Mosher and Chelsea Starr, and later Erin Rush and Justin Kelly. In 2007, Schwartz and Tomo toured Europe with a dancer named Mecca, and a keyboardist and DJ named Christelle. hey willpower have opened for bands including Scissor Sisters, Le Tigre, and Peaches." In spring/summer 2008, the Schwartz, Tomo, and Kelly will embark on another tour of the United States and Europe, retaining Mecca and adding dancers Hayley Kaufmann and Joey Guillory.

In the US, hey willpower released a self-titled EP through Cochon Records in 2005 (which went out of print and was re-released as Dance in 2007). Singles for "Double Fantasy II" and "Hundredaire" were released, with music video clips directed by the band's own Justin Kelly. 2006 saw a European-released LP titled PDA, from Tomlab. In 2006, the band also contributed to a duet version of Norwegian electronic pop singer Annie's song "Chewing Gum." In 2007, the band recorded a cover of Architecture in Helsinki's song "Heart It Races"at Different Fur Studios in San Francisco, with Engineer Patrick Brown.

In press, Will Schwartz has spoken effusively about his love for radio-friendly, danceable pop music, how emotionally and physically he is moved by it, and the pleasure he feels from seeing an audience move around and make some noise. He has name-dropped the likes of Janet Jackson, L'Trimm, Michael Jackson, Prince, Gwen Stefani, Justin Timberlake, and Missy Elliott as influences to hey willpower's sound. Schwartz has noted that some audiences disregard dance pop music like the kind he makes with hey willpower as being without musical integrity or value; as opposed to the sort of indie rock, post-punk music he makes with Imperial Teen. Schwartz refutes and rejects these attitudes. The music video for "Double Fantasy II" carried a John Lennon and Yoko Ono-inspired concept that urged viewers to "give dance a chance."

== Discography ==
=== Albums ===
- hey willpower EP (2005)
- PDA (2006)
- Dance EP (2007)

=== Singles ===
- Double Fantasy II (2005)
- Hundredaire (2005)
