= What Is Not to Love =

Studio album by Imperial Teen
- Released: ^{US} September 15, 1998
- Genre: Indie rock, indie pop
- Length: 45:24
- Label: Slash
- Producer: Mark Freegard, Steve McDonald

Imperial Teen chronology
Seasick (1996)	What Is Not to Love (1998)	On (2002)

Professional ratings
Review scores
Source	Rating
AllMusic	4/5 stars
Robert Christgau	A−
The Encyclopedia of Popular Music	3/5 stars
Rolling Stone	3.5/5 stars
Spin	6/10
Tiny Mix Tapes	4/5 stars

What Is Not to Love is the second album by indie-rock band Imperial Teen. It is the follow-up to their first full-length record, Seasick (1996), and was released in 1998 via Slash Records.

== Critical reception ==
Entertainment Weekly wrote that "there's something fundamentally warm and cuddly about the mixed-gender quartet's seductive mix of indie-rock cliches (distorted guitars, diffident vocals) and hook-and-harmony-informed popcraft".

== Track listing ==
All songs written by Imperial Teen.

1. "Open Season" – 2:25
2. "Birthday Girl" – 3:36
3. "Yoo Hoo" – 3:30
4. "Lipstick" – 4:00
5. "Alone in the Grass" – 7:15
6. "Crucible" – 4:18
7. "The Beginning" – 2:39
8. "Year of the Tan" – 3:05
9. "Seven" – 4:33
10. "Hooray" (live) – 7:11
11. "Beauty" – 2:52

== Personnel ==
=== Band members ===
- Roddy Bottum – guitar, vocals
- Will Schwartz – guitar, vocals
- Jone Stebbins – bass, backing vocals
- Lynn Truell – drums, backing vocals

=== Technical staff ===
- Mark Freegard – producer, engineer, mixing
- Andre Moran – engineer
- Mark Saunders – mixing
- Greg Freeman – engineer
- Bill Inglot – mastering
- Matt Kelley – engineer
- Mickey Petralia – producer, mixing
- Chris Scard – second engineer
- Gabriel Shepard – second engineer
- Matt Wallace – mixing
- Howard Willing – second engineer
