= Club Babyhead =

Defunct nightclub in Rhode Island, US

Coordinates: 41.82024°N 71.41145°W

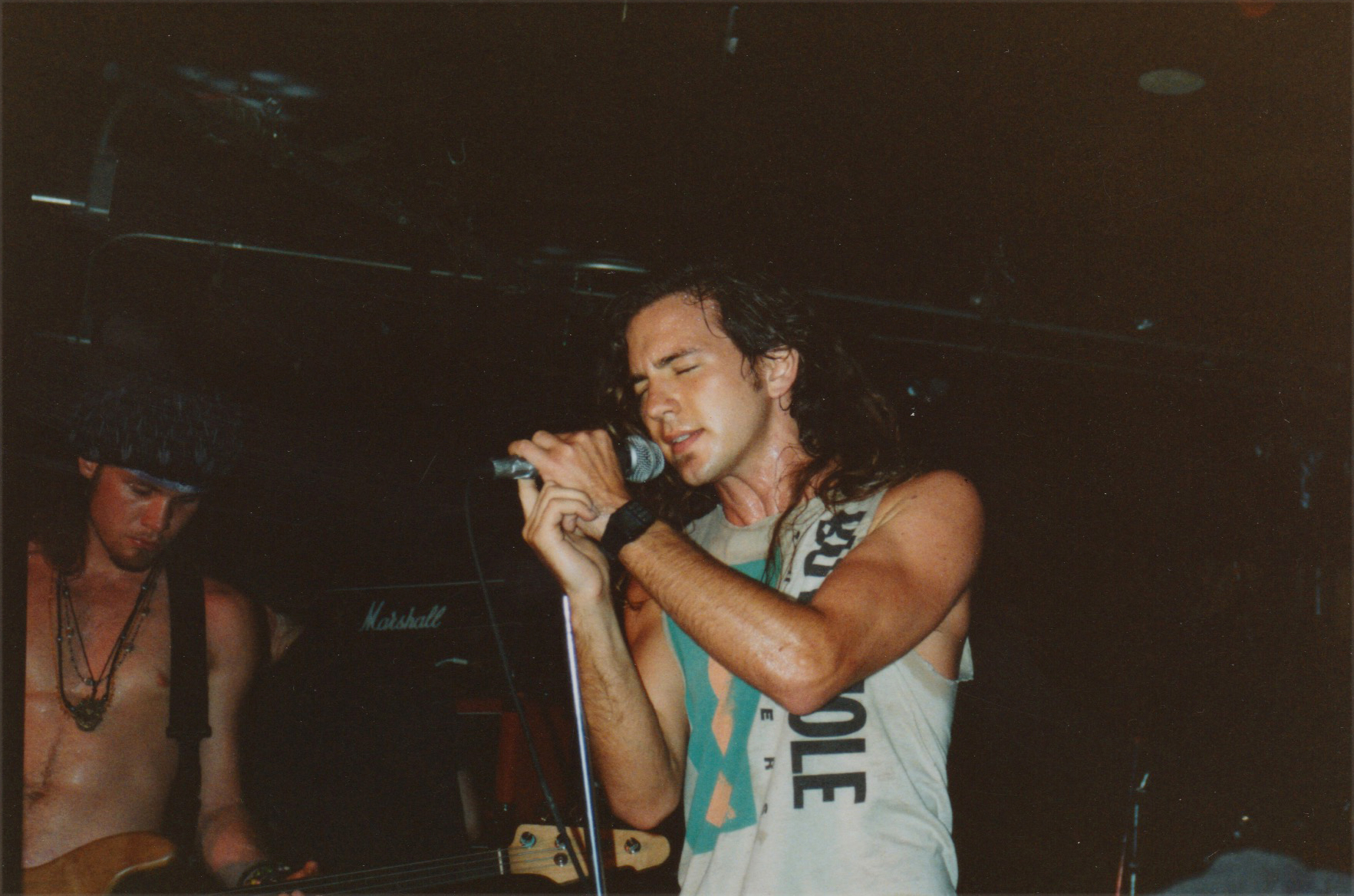
American rock band Pearl Jam performing live at Club Babyhead, Providence, RI (July 15, 1991).

Club Babyhead was a nightclub and hard rock music venue in Providence, Rhode Island.

The venue was located at 73 Richmond Street. It was known for being dark and gritty.

Prior to being dubbed Club Babyhead, the venue was known as Club Rocket, likely because of the amusement park rocket ship that hung in the club's entryway.

== Club nights ==
In 1992 and 1993, Club Babyhead was the only local venue providing space for hardcore acts. Audience members at the club's hardcore shows often engaged in moshing.

Club Babyhead hosted a "Stupid Dance Party" Thursday and Sunday nights, that featured an eclectic mix of music DJ'ed by Jared Dubois.

The club hosted electronic club nights that attracted the rave scene.

Club Babyhead regularly featured matinées, which teenagers attended.

== Featured musicians ==
From 1990 to 1997, Club Babyhead featured performances from L7, Buzzcocks, Babes in Toyland, Electrafixion, Shelter, The Breeders, Scarce, Alanis Morissette, Yo La Tengo, Melvins, The Mighty Mighty Bosstones, Pearl Jam, The Smashing Pumpkins, Nirvana, Meat Puppets, Mudhoney, Blind Melon, Bo Diddley, Green Day, The Dead Kennedys, Arab on Radar, Godflesh, Marilyn Manson, Deftones, Catherine Wheel, The Proletariat, Snuff, Butt Trumpet, Throwing Muses, Goo Goo Dolls, Samiam, Only Living Witness, and Korn.

== Nirvana show ==
On September 25, 1991, Nirvana performed alongside Melvins at Club Babyhead. The show occurred a day after Nevermind was released, as part of Nirvana's Nevermind tour. Kurt Cobain broke his amp while the band played the first song "Jesus Wants Me for a Sunbeam", a cover by The Vaselines. During the performance, the band played several covers, including "Here She Comes Now" by The Velvet Underground and "D-7" by Wipers. That night, Nirvana played, “Help Me, I’m Hungry”, which they rarely performed. As Cobain was having technical problems during the show, he smashed his Boss DS-1 Distortion pedal on stage, and threw it into the crowd. In 2020, the pedal was sold on Julien's Auctions for $8,960.
