= Heart and Mind (album) =

Studio album by Sister Double Happiness
- Released: 1991
- Studio: Record II
- Genres: Alternative rock, blues rock
- Label: Reprise
- Producer: Kevin Laffey

Sister Double Happiness chronology
Sister Double Happiness (1988)	Heart and Mind (1991)	Uncut (1992)

Heart and Mind is an album by the American band Sister Double Happiness, released in 1991. It was their major label debut.

The band supported the album by opening for Nirvana and then Soundgarden, on separate tours. Heart and Mind was nominated for several Bay Area Music Awards.

== Production ==
Sister Double Happiness broke up after releasing its 1988 debut album. Frontman Gary Floyd spent two years at a Hindu monastery before reforming the band, which right away attracted the attention of major record labels.

Produced by Kevin Laffey, the album was recorded at Record II Studios, in Comptche, California. Danny Roman joined the band on guitar after the recording sessions. "Dark Heart" is an indictment of the Gulf War.

== Critical reception ==
Professional ratings
Review scores
Source	Rating
AllMusic	1.5/5 stars
Chicago Sun-Times	4/4 stars
The Herald	D
Troy Daily News	4/5 stars

Spin called the album "uncomplicated, love-obsessed, heavy blues-rock, untouched by the stylistic and technical developments of the last 15 years." The San Francisco Chronicle thought that "Floyd brings a well-developed sense of melodics to an otherwise highly charged sound and his round, warm voice gives the lyrics a surprising resonance."

The Chicago Sun-Times opined that Heart and Mind finds Floyd "exploring more inward terrain in a voice that sounds like Roky Erickson sitting on a washing machine during the spin cycle ... Floyd has a powerful vibrato that backs up his unflinching sentiments." UPI concluded that it "presents the neo-psychedelic foursome of Lynn Perko, Ben Cohen, Jeff Palmer and Gary Floyd—former Buddhist monk and front for Austin, Texas, punk band the Dicks—in a dozen original cuts that slice and smear the spectrum like a palette knife."

AllMusic wrote that "the major problem is the production by Kevin Laffey; it takes the bite and power out of the guitars and pushes singer Gary Floyd too far above the mix." SF Weekly deemed the album "an anesthetized version of the band's punk-meets-blues concept—perfect for fans of both Husker Du and Led Zeppelin." The Austin Chronicle called it "a mess, thudding like late-Eighties Heart crossed with .38 Special, and absolutely no clue where in the mix to position Floyd, who seems to be singing outside in the hallway."

== Track listing ==
No.	Title	Length
1.	"Bobby Shannon"
2.	"Ain't It a Shame"
3.	"Exposed to You"
4.	"Sweet-Talker"
5.	"You Don't Know Me"
6.	"The Sailor Song"
7.	"Dark Heart"
8.	"Heart and Mind"
9.	"Hey Kids"
10.	"I'm Drowning"
11.	"Don't Worry"
12.	"You for You"
