= The Hair the TV the Baby & the Band =

Studio album by Imperial Teen
- Released: August 21, 2007
- Genre: Indie rock, indie pop
- Length: 37:55
- Label: Merge Records
- Producer: Anna Waronker, Steven McDonald, Imperial Teen

Imperial Teen chronology
Live at Maxwell's (2002)	The Hair the TV the Baby & the Band (2007)	Feel the Sound (2012)

Professional ratings
Review scores
Source	Rating
AllMusic	3.5/5 stars
Robert Christgau	(A−)
Pitchfork	(6.2/10)
Tiny Mix Tapes	3/5
PopMatters	5/10

The Hair the TV the Baby & the Band is the fourth studio album by the indie rock band Imperial Teen. It is the follow-up to On (2002), and was released in the U.S. on August 21, 2007, by Merge Records. The album was #38 on Rolling Stone's list of the Top 50 Albums of 2007.

== Track listing ==
No.	Title	Length
1.	"Everything"	3:19
2.	"Do It Better"	3:30
3.	"Shim Sham"	2:56
4.	"The Hair the TV the Baby and the Band"	3:12
5.	"One Two"	2:28
6.	"Room With a View"	4:08
7.	"It's Now"	2:47
8.	"Fallen Idol"	3:35
9.	"Sweet Potato"	2:27
10.	"Everyone Wants to Know"	3:17
11.	"21st Century"	2:50
12.	"What You Do"	3:20
Total length:		37:55
