= Tomo Yasuda =

Japanese-American electronic musician

- Born: Tomo Yasuda
- Origin: San Francisco
- Instruments: Electronics, bass guitar
- Years active: 2003-present
- Formerly of: The Boy Explodes, hey willpower, Tussle

Tomo Yasuda (better known as Tomo) is a Japanese-American electronic musician, who is based in San Francisco. He has recorded as a solo artist, and as a member of the bands The Boy Explodes, Hey willpower, and Tussle.

Tomo's first recorded release was "Death Rock Booty Call" (2003), with his band The Boy Explodes. This project included singer Shane Frink and drummer Ryan Brundage, and was described by the San Francisco Bay Guardian as "gloomy", "melancholic", "disco punk", "screamo", "dark, emotional music", "reverbed-out ghosts of Bauhaus, the Cure, and Joy Division, as well as Gary Numan and even Devo", belied by a colorful, even cheerful physical appearance.

Next came two recordings with Will Schwartz and their dance pop group hey willpower; "Hey willpower" (2005) and "PDA" (2006). (See main article.)

In 2006 Tomo released a solo record called Too Many Birthdays, from his own label called "The Daft Alliance". Collaborators included Nathan Burazer (of Tussle), Nathan Berlinguette (of Creation is Crucifixion), Colter Jacobsen (Devendra Banhart collaborator), and Window Window.

The label states that:

Tomo's music has been compared to that of Matmos, Kraftwerk, and Raymond Scott. Us fine folks here at Daft Alliance may not completely agree with those comparisons but have a hard time ourselves accurately describing Tomo's unique approach to electronic music. We do, however, agree with Marco Rivera, of Splendid magazine, when he said that "Tomo puts the intelligent back in IDM".

In the year 2007 Tomo joined psychedelic/visual/neo-thrash band Tussle, playing bass guitar. Tussle has been described as "Re-igniting the flame of experimentalism, Californian four-piece Tussle have emerged as pioneers of a new Krautrock-infused rhythmrock hybrid. Putting a pair of drummers at the forefront of their songs, the San Francisco based band has breathed new life into postpsychedelic art rock."
