= Maxwell's =

Former music club in Hoboken, New Jersey

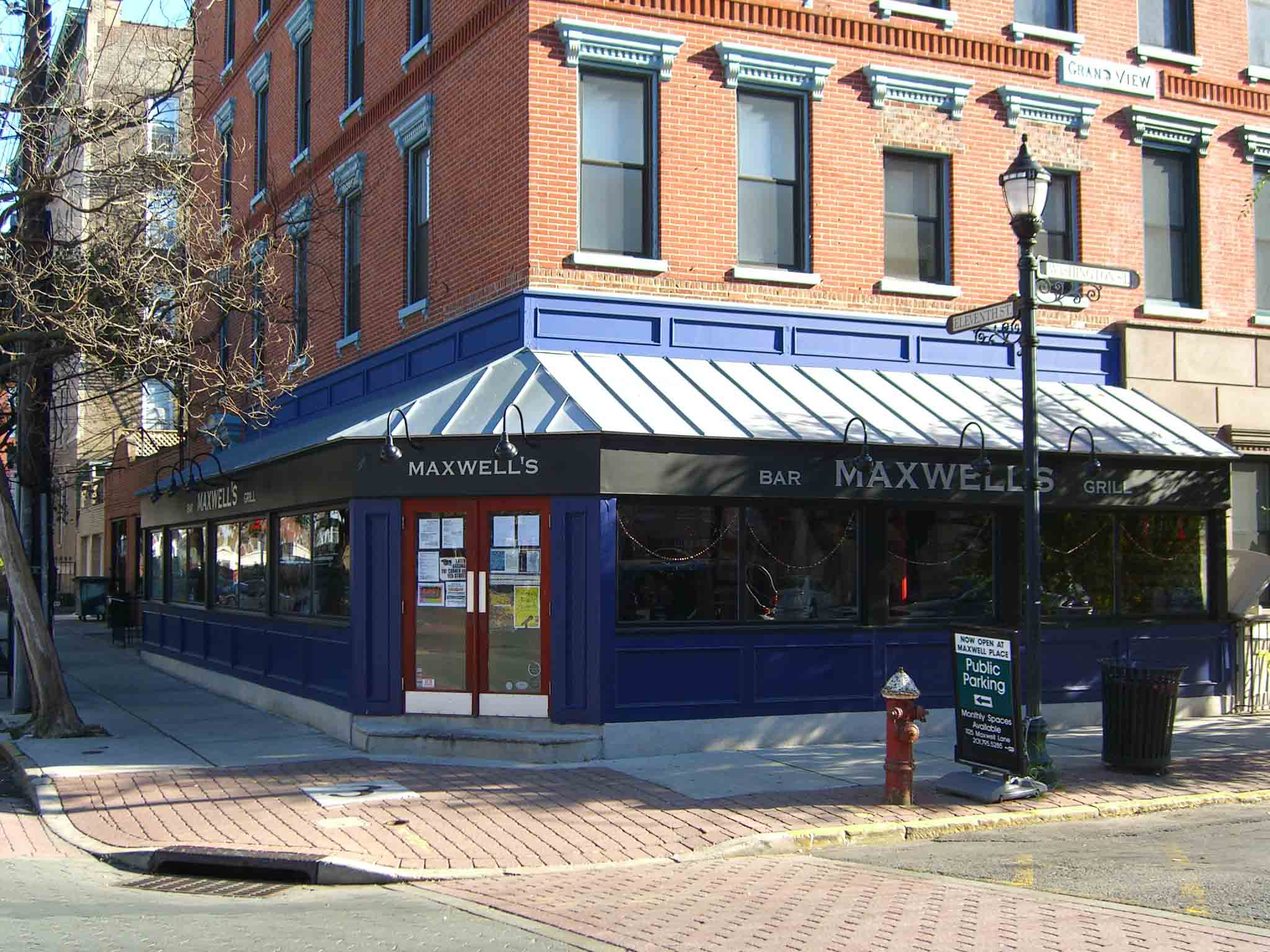
- Interactive map of Maxwell's
- Address: 1039 Washington Street, Hoboken, New Jersey, USA 07030
- Location: Southeast corner at Washington and 11th Streets
- Coordinates: 40°44′59″N 74°1′37″W
- Owner: Steve Fallon (founder)
- Capacity: 200 (backroom stage)
- Type: Music venue, restaurant, brewpub and contemporary art gallery
- Events: Punk, grunge, and indie rock

Construction
- Opened: August 1978
- Renovated: July 26, 1998
- Closed: February 2018

Maxwell's, last known as Maxwell's Tavern, was a bar/restaurant and music club in Hoboken, New Jersey. Over several decades the venue attracted a wide variety of acts looking for a change from the New York City concert spaces across the river. Maxwell's initially closed its doors on July 31, 2013, and reopened as Maxwell's Tavern in 2014, under new ownership. It closed again in February 2018.

== History ==
The club was opened in August 1978 by Steve Fallon. When the Fallon family bought the corner building in uptown Hoboken with its street-level tavern, Steve Fallon's sisters Kathryn Jackson Fallon and Anne Fallon Mazzolla along with brother-in-law Mario Mazzola were interested in turning the factory workers' tavern (General Foods' Maxwell House Coffee factory was a block away on the Hudson River) into more of a restaurant. The live music quickly caught on and Fallon started booking bands in the back room. Over time, his booking taste, freewheeling personality and respectful treatment towards musicians made Maxwell's and Hoboken a stop to look forward to on many bands' tours. By making the blue-collar mile-square city with a rough-and-tumble reputation a cultural gathering place, Maxwell's was instrumental in sparking Hoboken's first wave of early 1980s gentrification — the artists and musicians. In that light, it is also believed that the Mazzolas may have offered the first successful Sunday brunch in Hoboken.

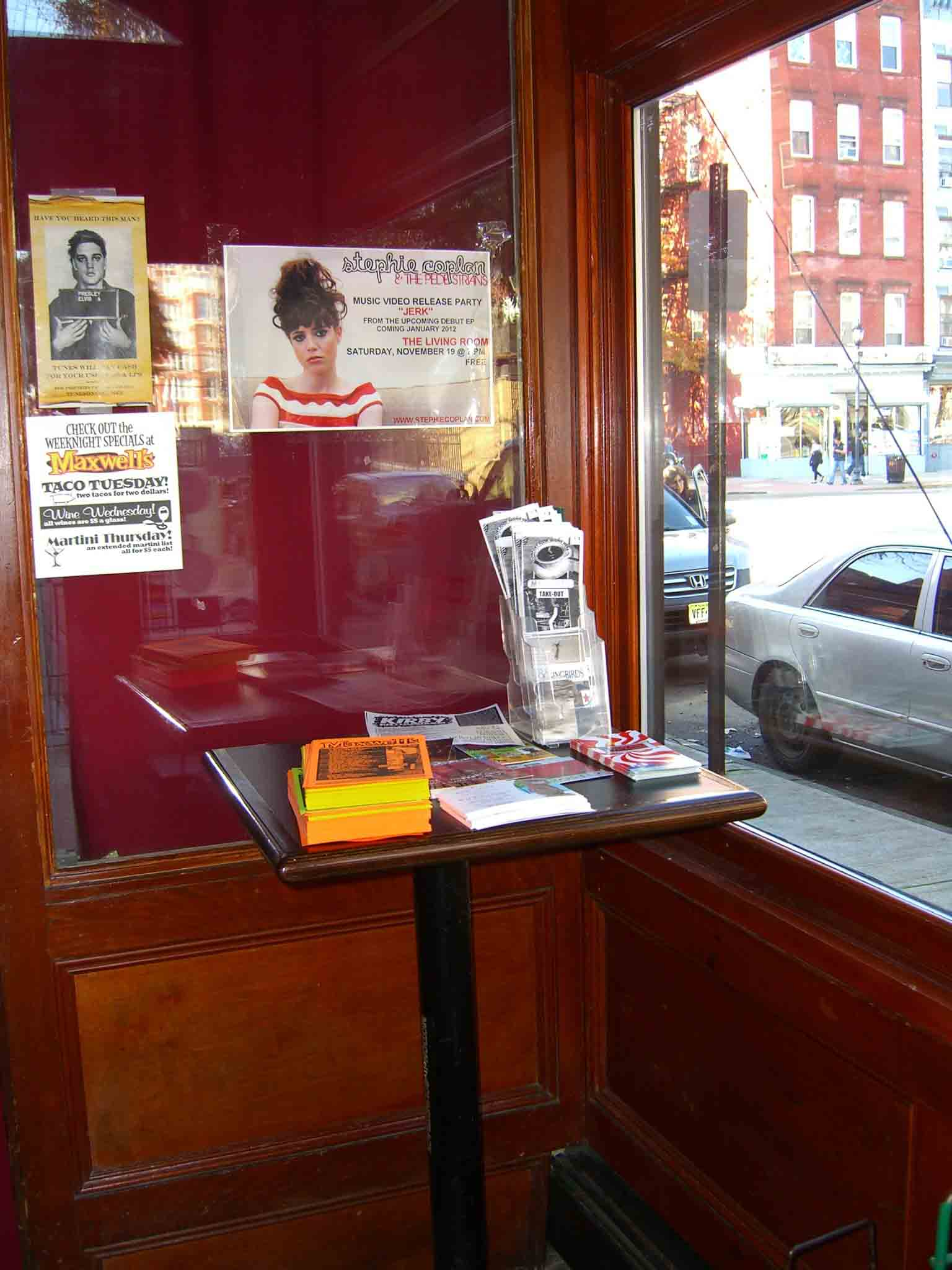
The entrance vestibule to Maxwell's on 11th Street

Maxwell's eventually became so successful that it spawned Pier Platters, an independent record store near the PATH train station that Fallon invested in; a whole music and cultural "scene" epitomized by the "Hoboken Sound" (which was featured in an hour-long television special on a local NYC station); and Fallon's own record label, Coyote Records. Fallon hired Todd Abramson to take over the booking of the acts in the mid-1980s. Abramson essentially booked the venue until its 2013 closing (except for a short period in the late 1990s after Fallon sold the club and Maxwell's was converted into a short-lived brewpub).

When Fallon wanted completely out, he and his partners sold Maxwell's in December 1995 to William (Silverback) Sutton, who then turned it into a brewpub. Abramson, Steve Shelley (drummer of Sonic Youth) and Dave Post of the Amazing Incredibles and Swingadelic arranged to bring Maxwell's back, and renovated and reopened it on July 26, 1998. While some longtime patrons missed the more freewheeling Steve Fallon days, Maxwell's again became as vital a part of the independent music community as it was in the 1980s and 1990s.

Parts of the music video for Bruce Springsteen's "Glory Days" were filmed at Maxwell's on May 28, 1985. The music video was directed by Hoboken resident John Sayles.

The video for the song "Away" by the Feelies, directed by Jonathan Demme, was recorded at Maxwell's in 1988. After a 17-year hiatus, the Feelies reunited to appear at Maxwell's in July 2008, and they made appearances again every July from 2009 through 2013.

While on tour supporting their debut album Bleach, Nirvana appeared at Maxwell's on July 13, 1989. Early in the day, before the show, photographer Ian Tilton took several pictures of the band around Hoboken while John Robb interviewed them for a Sounds front cover feature. The picture of frontman Kurt Cobain has since been used in dozens of magazines, newspapers and websites before and after his death.

In the early 1990s, Maxwell's was voted the "Best Club in New York — Even Though It's in New Jersey" by The New Yorker magazine.(subscription required)

In the 2005 Village Voice Best of NY poll, Maxwell's was voted "Best Reason to Leave the State for Dinner and a Show". Also in 2005, The New York Times wrote that Maxwell's was "so New York that it's in New Jersey".

The indie rock band Yo La Tengo usually rented out the club for the eight nights of Hanukkah every year.

In April 2013, Maxwell's came in third in Rolling Stone magazine's "Venues that Rock" list of the best clubs in America.

In June 2013 it was announced that Maxwell's would not renew its lease and the club would close in July. The club closed its doors on July 31, 2013, preceded by an afternoon block party on 11th Street between Washington Street and Hudson Place, beginning that afternoon, to commemorate its final night.

Maxwell's reopened temporarily in August 2013, solely as a bar and restaurant, while the owners sought to sell the venue; Justin Timberlake was allowed to film a commercial there.

In early 2014, it reopened under new ownership (a group of investors headed by Pete Carr and Rick Sorkin), with the name changed to Maxwell's Tavern.

The new group decided to refocus the tavern from music to food, converting the "venue's fabled backroom—which in the '80s and '90s had proved a launching pad for up-and-coming bands like R.E.M., Hüsker Dü, the Replacements and Nirvana"—into a dining room. The front room was fitted with large flatscreen televisions. However, when Maxwell's Tavern opened as a family-friendly pizzeria in April 2014, the owners realized it was a mistake, and for the next sixth months, retooled the premises to again present music. It reopened in October 2014, but was only able to book cover bands. By 2015, the owners gave up the pizzeria idea and engaged local promoter Dave Entwistle, who redesigned the sound stage and booked local talent.

The tavern continued to struggle, however. One cause was Carr's "disastrous interview" with the Hoboken Reporter, in which he slammed the previous ownership's maintenance of the building. The interview alienated many locals, who withheld their patronage. The owners were never able to book the up-and-coming bands that the older venue was known for, and eventually focused on trivia nights and country music. In early February 2018, the tavern announced on Facebook that it would close, and the final performances took place on February 10.

== Bands ==
Early bands to play Maxwell's include Hoboken natives the Bongos, who played under an alias, the Cucumbers, the Wygal sisters (later forming Splendora) and also the Feelies who played frequently from 1985.

In 1980, the Athens, Georgia band Pylon played there three times. In the mid-1980s, fellow Athens band R.E.M. played there on a frequent basis.

The club was important to emerging 1980s and 1990s trends as diverse as punk, grunge and indie rock. Notable bands that played the venue during those years include:

- Firehose,
- Fugazi,
- Blue Öyster Cult
- Nirvana
- Weezer,
- the Smashing Pumpkins,
- Minutemen
- Robyn Hitchcock,
- The Cowsills,
- The Strokes,

The club continued its tradition of booking new bands into the 2000s and 2010s, including the Othermen, the Dirtbombs, Lemuria, Crooked Fingers, the Wrens, My Chemical Romance, Screaming Females, Titus Andronicus, and Máxima Alerta.

== Live albums ==
Several bands recorded live albums at the venue, including Guided by Voices (For All Good Kids), the Reigning Sound (Live at Maxwells), the Meat Puppets (Live at Maxwell's 2.08.01), My Chemical Romance (The Black Parade Is Dead!), the Wedding Present (Live Tape No. 7 - Hoboken, 10th June 1990), Imperial Teen (Live at Maxwell's) and the Replacements (For Sale: Live at Maxwell's 1986).

== Criticism ==
As a music venue, Maxwell's was not very large. In fact, it only held about 200 people and was considered dark. The live music at a club in a residential area led some neighbors to complain about the noise as well as dancing in the streets during the early days of the club, before the expansion into the back room for appearances by musical acts. A Hoboken restaurant survey website gave Maxwell's a rating of 3.33 out of a possible 5 in October 2008.

== See also ==
- White Eagle Hall
- The Bongos
- New Jersey music venues by capacity
