= Sister Double Happiness =

American rock band

- Origin: San Francisco, California, United States
- Genres: Alternative rock, blues rock, post-punk
- Years active: 1986–1995
- Labels: SST, Sub-Pop, Reprise
- Past members: Gary Floyd; Lynn Perko; Ben Cohen; Jeff Palmer; Danny Roman; Miles Montalbano

Sister Double Happiness was an alternative blues rock band that existed from 1986 until 1995, formed in San Francisco, California, United States. Its core members were Gary Floyd and Lynn Perko, who were in the seminal punk rock band The Dicks, and Ben Cohen of the Pop-O-Pies.

Sister Double Happiness recorded and released four LPs, one EP, and one live record in its nine-year existence. After they disbanded, Floyd went on to front Black Kali Ma and recorded solo material. Perko later joined Imperial Teen. Jeff Palmer began playing bass in the Mommyheads in 1994, continuing until the latter's breakup in 1998.

== Members ==
=== Heart and Mind ===
- Gary Floyd - vocals and harmonica.
- Lynn Perko - drums, percussion, piano and organs.
- Ben Cohen - guitar, mandolin, and 6 string bass.
- Jeff Palmer - bass guitar

=== Uncut and self-titled EP ===
- Gary Floyd - vocals
- Lynn Perko - drums
- Ben Cohen - guitar
- Danny Roman - guitar
- Miles Montalbano - bass

== Discography ==
=== Studio recordings ===
- Sister Double Happiness LP, SST, 1988
- Heart and Mind LP, Reprise, 1991
- Hey Kids Maxi Single, Reprise, 1992
- Uncut LP, Warner Chapel Music, 1993 (reissued on Dutch East India Trading)
- Sister Double Happiness EP, Warner Chapel Music, 1993 (reissued on Dutch East India Trading)
- Horsey Water LP, Sub-Pop, 1994

=== Live recordings ===
==== Audio ====
- A Stone's Throw from Love (Live and Acoustic at the Great American Music Hall 06/17/92), Innerstate, 1999

==== Video ====
A live concert video Sister Double Happiness Live: Greetings from Zurich was released on Studio K7 home video in the mid 1990s, taped from a show on September 24, 1993. The set list included songs from both Sister Double Happiness and the Dicks:

1. Bobby Shannon
2. Don't Worry
3. Lightning
4. Ashes
5. Exposed to You
6. San Diego
7. Freight Train
8. You Don't Know Me
9. Whipping Song
10. No Good For You
11. Dicks Hate Police
12. Two-Headed Dog

== Post-breakup ==
After the dissolution of Sister Double Happiness, Floyd formed and primarily played in Europe with the blues group The Gary Floyd Band; an overview of this material, Backdoor Preacher Man, is available in the United States.

Floyd and Sister Double Happiness guitarist Danny Roman formed Black Kali Ma, a blues-punk act that recorded an LP for Alternative Tentacles in 1999. Drummer Bruce Ducheneaux (Assassins of God) and guitar player Matt Margolin (Smokin' Rhythm Prawns) joined Roman and Floyd in Black Kali Ma. Rolling Stone Magazine reviewed Black Kali Ma's album and gave it three stars.

Gary Floyd played in the band Buddha Brothers, and recorded solo as a country musician. Perko went on to become a member of indie rock band Imperial Teen in 1996, and appears on You Ride The Pony (I'll Be The Bunny). Floyd died on May 2, 2024.

Ben continues to record and perform as Benjamin Cohen; his latest album is available online.
