= Feel the Sound =

Studio album by Imperial Teen
- Released: January 31, 2012
- Genre: Pop rock, alternative rock
- Label: Merge

Imperial Teen chronology
The Hair the TV the Baby & the Band (2007)	Feel the Sound (2012)	Now We Are Timeless (2019)

Feel the Sound is the fifth studio album by the indie pop band Imperial Teen. It was released in 2012 on Merge Records. The follow-up to 2007's The Hair the TV the Baby and the Band, the album was recorded while members of the band were living variously in San Francisco, Los Angeles, and New York City. While previous albums had been produced by Steven McDonald of Redd Kross, Feel the Sound is self-produced.

== Reception ==
Professional ratings
Aggregate scores
Source	Rating
Metacritic	71/100
Review scores
Source	Rating
AllMusic	4/5 stars
The A.V. Club	B
Beats Per Minute	66%
Billboard	4.5/5 stars
Consequence of Sound	C+
Pitchfork	6.2/10
Rolling Stone	3.5/5 stars
Spin	8/10
Tiny Mix Tapes	1.5/5 marks

Feel the Sound received positive reviews from critics. On Metacritic, the album holds a score of 71/100 based on 21 reviews, indicating "generally favorable reviews".

== Track listing ==
No.	Title	Length
1.	"Runaway"	3:28
2.	"No Matter What You Say"	3:30
3.	"Last to Know"	3:46
4.	"Over His Head"	3:49
5.	"Hanging About"	3:58
6.	"All the Same"	3:27
7.	"Don't Know How You Do It"	3:30
8.	"Out from Inside"	3:57
9.	"The Hibernates"	3:20
10.	"It's You"	2:55
11.	"Overtaken"	4:32
Total length:		40:12
