= Das Damen =

American alternative rock band

- Origin: New York City, U.S.
- Genre: Alternative rock
- Years active: 1984–1991
- Labels: Ecstatic Peace!, SST, Twin/Tone, City Slang, Sub Pop
- Past members: Jim Walters; Alex Totino; Phil Leopold von Trapp; Lyle Hysen; David Motamed

Das Damen was an alternative rock band from New York City, formed in 1984. The band released several albums before splitting up in 1991. The band's name is fake German and roughly translates to "the ladies" (the correct German form would be Die Damen).

== History ==
The band was formed in 1984 by Jim Walters (vocals, guitar), Alex Totino (guitar, vocals), Phil Leopold von Trapp (bass, vocals), and Lyle Hysen (drums). Totino and Hysen were previously in the New York hardcore band The Misguided. Das Damen released their self-titled debut album on Thurston Moore's Ecstatic Peace! in 1986. They subsequently signed to SST Records and released Jupiter Eye in 1987, which has been described as "quasi-hardcore that touched on MC5-like garage psychedelia". A third album, Triskaidekaphobe, followed. It featured a guest appearance by ex-MC5 guitarist Wayne Kramer.

The Marshmellow Conspiracy EP (1988) was withdrawn when it was discovered that the track "Song for Michael Jackson to $ell" was in fact an uncredited version of The Beatles' "Magical Mystery Tour". It was later reissued without the track. Two of the three remaining songs were from the previous LP, one in a new version featuring Kramer.

The band's next release was the 1989 album Mousetrap on the Twin/Tone label. Von Trapp left to be replaced by David Motamed. The band then moved on to City Slang for the live album Entertaining Friends, recorded at CBGB, and their final release was the High Anxiety mini-set in July 1991, co-released by City Slang and Sub Pop.

Motamed later joined Cell.

== Musical style ==
Ira Robbins of Trouser Press described the band's debut as "six badly mixed long songs that are noisy but fun". The band's sound fused alternative rock with heavy metal, psychedelic rock, and acid rock.

== Discography ==
=== Albums ===
- Das Damen (1986), Ecstatic Peace
- Jupiter Eye (1987), SST
- Triskaidekaphobe (1988), SST
- Mousetrap (1989), Twin/Tone
- Entertaining Friends (live) (1990), City Slang
- High Anxiety mini (1991), City Slang/Sub Pop
- 1986: Keeps Me Wild (2023), Dromedary

=== Singles, EPs ===
- Marshmellow Conspiracy EP (1988), SSTCategory:SST Records artists
- "Noon Daylight" (1989), What Goes On / Twin/Tone (UK Indie No. 12)
- "Sad Mile" / "Making Time" (1989), Sub Pop - Sub Pop Singles Club release
