= Blind Pig (venue) =

American music venue in Ann Arbor, Michigan

The Blind Pig
- The Blind Pig's logo

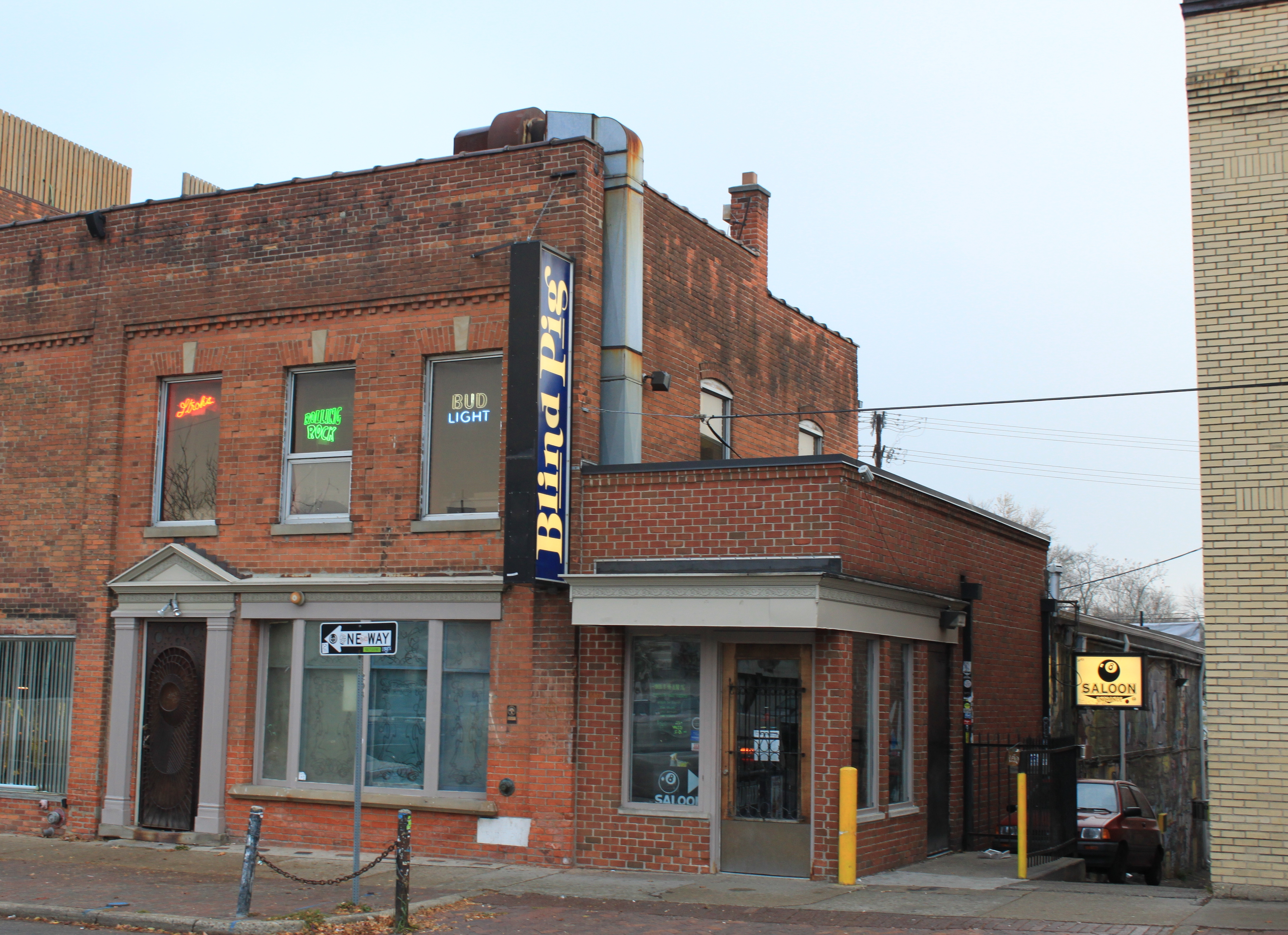
- The Blind Pig in 2010
- Interactive map of The Blind Pig
- Location: 208 S. First Street Ann Arbor, MI
- Coordinates: 42.28023°N 83.75126°W
- Capacity: 400

Construction
- Opened: 1971; 55 years ago

Website
- www.blindpigmusic.com

The Blind Pig is a music venue in Ann Arbor, Michigan. The club was established as a home for blues musicians, although today it books predominantly indie rock acts and local groups.

== History ==
The Blind Pig opened in 1971. Tom Isaia and Jerry DelGiudice created it as a European-influenced cafe, complete with espresso/cappuccino, a unique and varied food menu, including home made soups, Italian biscotti, crostini, a full wine and beer list, and top-notch blues entertainment. The partners renovated an old downtown Ann Arbor building and named the combined cafe/club after illegal after-hours gathering places, referred to by the slang term 'blind pig', another name for a speakeasy. DelGiudice started the still-operating Blind Pig Records recording label in 1975 to showcase music by many of the groups who performed regularly at the club.

Isaia and DelGiudice sold the venue in 1979 to Dave Whitmore, who in turn sold to Roy and Betty Goffett three years later. They doubled the club's space by renovating the rear portion of the building, opening the 8-Ball Saloon on the lower level and moving the stage to the more spacious main floor. The expansion made the venue more conducive to crowd-heavy rock shows and has hosted acts such as Tally Hall, Joan Baez, Bo Diddley, George Thorogood, 10,000 Maniacs, Sonic Youth, Soul Asylum, Bob Mould, Soundgarden, The Smashing Pumpkins, The Velvet Beat, Pearl Jam, Nirvana, No Doubt, Dave Matthews Band, Tool, Jewel, Godsmack, Papa Roach, and John Mayer.

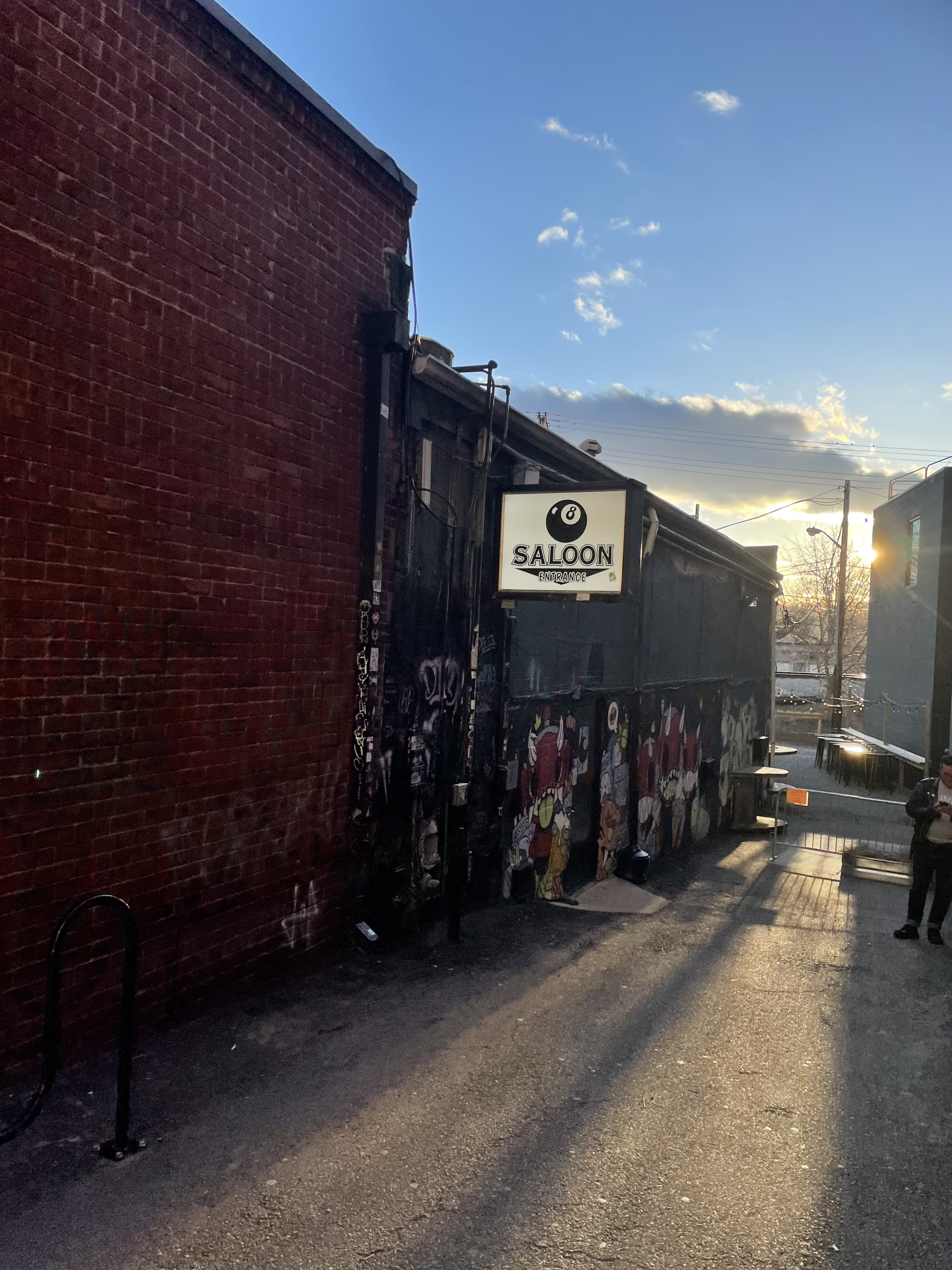
The 8 Ball Saloon, on the building's lower level

Since then, the Blind Pig has attracted a steady stream of up-and-coming acts, hosting shows almost every night all year round.

== Trivia ==
- In 1989, a then little-known Nirvana performed a sold-out show at the Blind Pig, thanks in large part to Soundgarden, who recommended the band during its sold-out performance a week prior. In a televised MTV interview years later, they cited the Blind Pig as their all-time favorite venue to play. A tribute to the band created by the Goffetts lines a wall by the entrance to the club.
- The Blind Pig was cited as one of the primary reasons for Ann Arbor's listing as the #7 "Campus Scene That Rocks" in a 2003 RollingStone Magazine feature.
- The Blind Pig appeared in a Biden for President commercial in October 2020 leading up to the November 2020 presidential election. The commercial cited President Donald Trump's lack of a COVID-19 response to assist music venues like The Blind Pig that have been shuttered since March 2020.
