= Melody Event Center =

Historic building in Portland, Oregon, U.S.

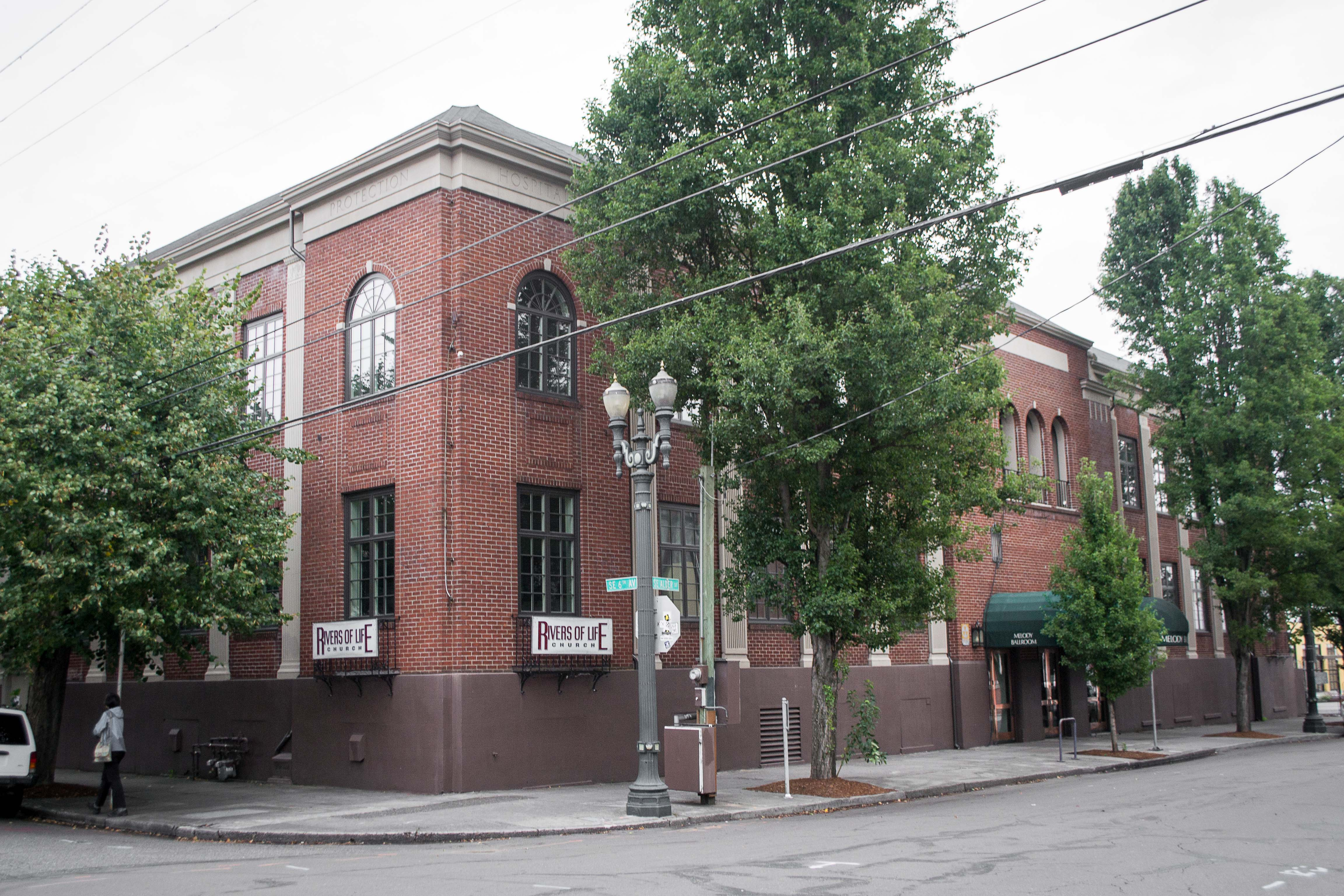
- The building's exterior in 2013
- Interactive map of the Melody Event Center area

General information
- Location: Portland, Oregon, United States
- Coordinates: 45°31′5.5″N 122°39′33.6″W

Melody Event Center, formerly Melody Ballroom, is a historic building in southeast Portland, Oregon's Buckman neighborhood, in the United States. Built in 1925, the structure previously housed the headquarters for the life insurance company Woodmen of the World.

== Concerts ==
Melody Event Center has hosted several concerts with bands such as Bob Mould and Nirvana.
