= On (Imperial Teen album) =

Studio album by Imperial Teen
- Released: April 9, 2002
- Genre: Indie rock, indie pop
- Length: 38:26
- Label: Merge Records
- Producer: Anna Waronker, Steve McDonald, Imperial Teen

Imperial Teen chronology
What is Not to Love (1998)	On (2002)	Live at Maxwell's (2002)

Professional ratings
Review scores
Source	Rating
AllMusic	4/5 stars
Rolling Stone	3.5/5 stars
Pitchfork	7.7/10
Robert Christgau	A−

On is the third studio album by indie rock band Imperial Teen. It is the follow-up to their second full-length record What is Not to Love (1998), and was released in the U.S. on April 9, 2002 from Merge Records. On March 30, 2009, Amazon.com selected it as the 43rd greatest indie rock album of all time.

== Track listing ==
1. "Ivanka" – 3:15
2. "Baby" – 2:44
3. "Sugar" – 3:25
4. "Million $ Man" – 4:22
5. "Captain" – 2:39
6. "Our Time" – 2:17
7. "Undone" – 4:07
8. "Mr. & Mrs." – 3:06
9. "Teacher's Pet" – 2:16
10. "City Song" – 2:28
11. "My Spy" – 3:26
12. "The First" – 4:21
