= Osaka Conference Center =

Conference center in Tennoji-ku, Osaka, Japan

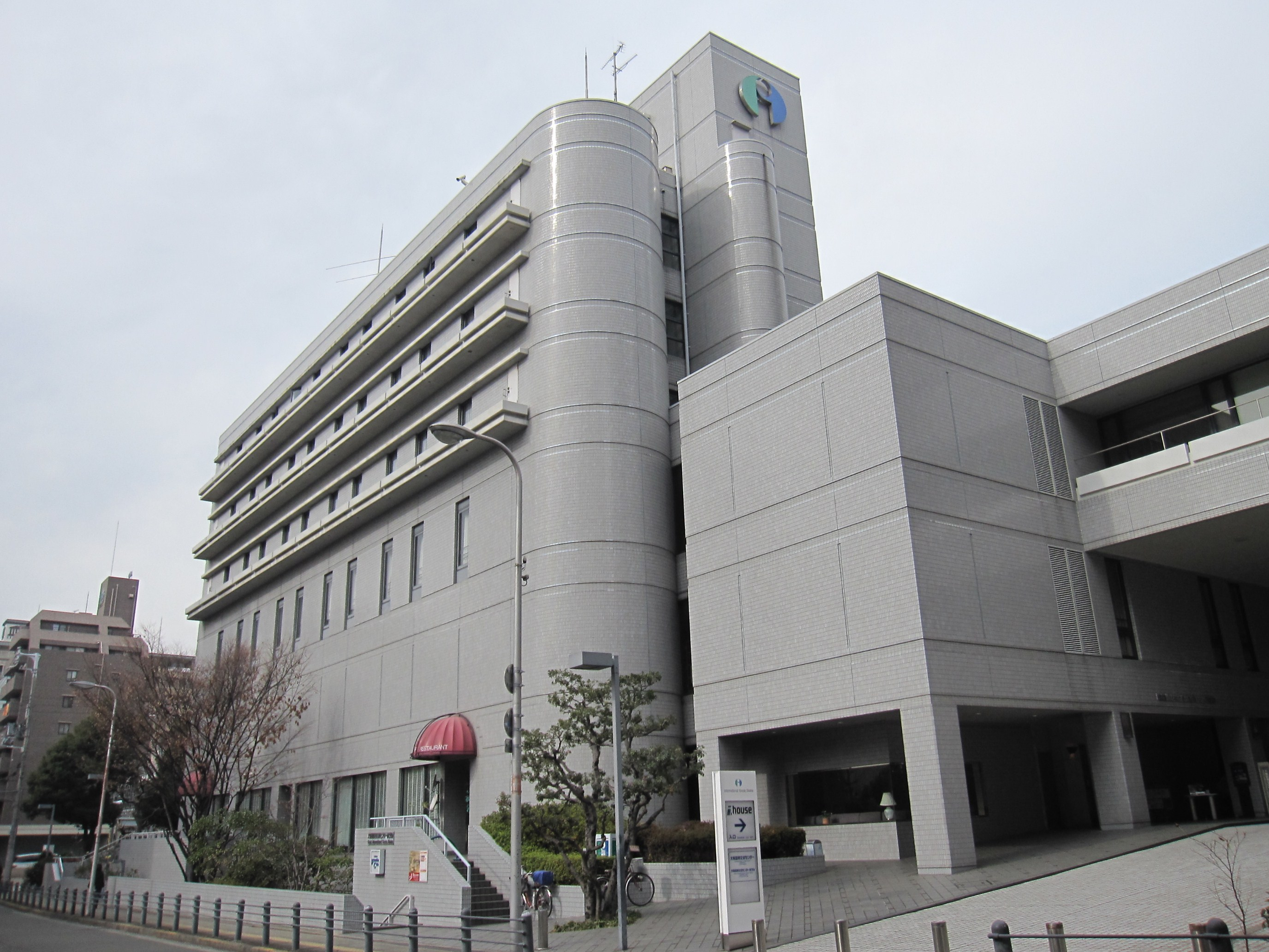
- Interactive map of Osaka Conference Center
- Former names: International House, Osaka
- Address: 8-2-6 Uehommachi,
- Location: Tennoji-ku, Osaka, Osaka, Japan
- Coordinates: 34°39′43″N 135°31′3″E
- Owner: City of Osaka
- Operator: Convention Linkage, Inc.
- Public transit: Ōsaka Uehonmachi Station

Construction
- Built: December 1985—August 1987
- Opened: 21 September 1987
- Cost: ¥12.2 billion (¥15.7 billion in 2024 yen)

Website
- www.ih-osaka.jp/en/

Osaka Conference Center (大阪カンファレンスセンター, Ōsaka kanfarensu sentā), officially known as Osaka Conference Center & Hotel (大阪カンファレンスセンター＆ホテル, Ōsaka kanfarensu sentā ando hoteru), is a conference center with a hotel in Tennoji-ku, Osaka, Osaka, Japan. Although Convention Linkage, Inc., the operator appointed by the City of Osaka, has started re-branding since April 2014, the center is still known as International House, Osaka (大阪国際交流センター, Ōsaka kokusai kōryū sentā) or i-house (アイハウス, Ai hausu) for the building name it tenants.
