= Seasick (album) =

Studio album by Imperial Teen
- Released: May 7, 1996
- Recorded: 1996
- Genre: Indie pop
- Length: 38:47
- Label: Slash/London
- Producer: Steve McDonald, Imperial Teen

Imperial Teen chronology
| Seasick (1996) | What Is Not to Love (1998) |

Seasick is the debut studio album by the American band Imperial Teen, released on May 7, 1996, by Slash Records. The album received positive reviews from critics.

== Recording and release ==
Seasick was recorded in one week after the band had been together for six months.

== Reception ==
Professional ratings
Review scores
| Source | Rating |
|---|---|
| AllMusic | 3/5 stars |
| Entertainment Weekly | B+ |
| The Guardian | 4/5 stars |
| NME | 8/10 |
| Rolling Stone | 3/5 stars |
| The Rolling Stone Album Guide | 3.5/5 stars |
| Spin | 9/10 |
| The Village Voice | A− |

Writing for Spin, Barry Walters praised the songwriting, stating that the "hooks are immediate, nearly non-stop, and the happy/sad lyrics draw you in with abstract intimacy." The New York Times concluded that "listening to Seasick is like listening to a beautifully arranged Beach Boys album with the lyrics changed to diatribes about how much the band hates sun, surfing and girls." The album was ranked number 24 in The Village Voice's 1996 Pazz & Jop critics' poll.

In a retrospective review, AllMusic reviewer Ned Raggett felt that Seasick was "in many ways the lost Breeders album after Last Splash—brash, sharp-edged, taking no crap, and having good fun while doing so."

== Track listing ==
1. "Imperial Teen" – 4:56
2. "Water Boy" – 1:37
3. "Butch" – 4:28
4. "Pig Latin" – 3:04
5. "Blaming the Baby" – 2:15
6. "You're One" – 3:23
7. "Balloon" – 3:46
8. "Tippy Tap" – 4:14
9. "Copafeelia" – 4:33
10. "Luxury" – 4:23
11. "Eternity" – 3:54
