= Nunbait =

Australian punk rock band

- Origin: Sydney, New South Wales, Australia
- Genres: Punk rock
- Years active: 1989–1993, 2010
- Labels: Waterfront; Survival; Hippy Knight
- Past members: Ian "Ivan" Fraser; Shaun Butcher; Mark Guthrie; Mathew Fante; Jay Doherty

Nunbait were an Australian punk rock band formed in 1989. They joined the thriving inner-city music scene in the late 1980s and early 1990s that featured artists such as The Cosmic Psychos, Frenzal Rhomb, and Kiss My Poodles Donkey, as well as Tumbleweed, The Meanies and Nitocris. Nunbait were leaders in the second wave of punk inspired bands that followed the Black Eye Records groups, such as Thug, Lubricated Goat and Box the Jesuit.

== History ==
Nunbait were formed in Sydney in 1989 with Shaun Butcher on guitar, Jay Doherty on drums, Ian Fraser on vocals and Mark Guthrie on bass guitar and vocals. Butcher and Guthrie had been in bands in Townsville; Guthrie then joined Fraser's Brisbane proto-grunge 1960s garage punk-inspired combo Dementia 13 (1984–1988). In the late-1980s, Butcher, Fraser and Guthrie had each migrated separately from Queensland to the Sydney suburb of Newtown, where they formed the band with Doherty, a native of Mudgee, who took up drums despite limited experience. Doherty named them Numbait as a pun on jailbait. Their music was referred to as "noise rock". Doherty died in 1990 and was replaced by Mathew Fante on drums.

The band's first release was a 500-copy run of a self-pressed single, "Track Trauma" (June 1990) on Masterbait Music Inc. After winning a battle of the bands at Sydney's Lansdowne Hotel, Nunbait secured a contract with local underground label, Waterfront Records, and released an extended play, The Hub (named after a Newtown porn theatre), in the same year, which was produced by Stu Spasm. It has six original tracks, albeit one, "The Melting Hour", had its origins in Dementia 13 days. Jack Marx of Drum Media described the EP as "a blisteringly nasty little piece of rock and roll work."

Nunbait supported gigs by Butthole Surfers (Burland Hall Newtown, 1991), Mudhoney (Phoenician Club Sydney, 1990), Einstürzende Neubauten and The Beasts of Bourbon (Phoenician Club Sydney 1991), Nirvana (Selinas, Sydney, February 1992), Helmet (1991), Fugazi (1991) as well as performing shows with Superchunk and fellow local underground acts Tumbleweed, Cosmic Psychos, and the Celibate Rifles. Shane Danielson of The Sydney Morning Herald described their style as "not for the faint-hearted. Loud, intense and confrontational, theirs is a wild, lurching noise that hurls itself against you."

A follow-up single, "Nowhere Fast", mixed by Sub Pop's Jack Endino and Mudhoney’s Mark Arm, was released on Waterfront in 1991, charting at #3 in the independent street music charts. Local label Survival issued a four-track EP, Spinout, in June 1992. The band's final release, on tiny Melbourne label Hippy Knight, was a hastily mixed album, Busted, the production of which left the members extremely dissatisfied. They disbanded soon after. The band reformed for a short tour (with The Hard Ons) in 2010.

== Personnel ==
- Ian (Ivan) Fraser - Vocals (1989–1993)
- Shaun Butcher - Guitar (1989–1993)
- Mark Guthrie - Bass, Vocals (1989–1993)
- Jay Doherty - Drums (1989–1990)
- Mathew Fante - Drums (1990–1993)

== Discography ==
45s

- Track Trauma / Blow Me Away (1990), (Masterbait Records), recorded at Sound Barrier, June 1990, produced by Nunbait with help from Amr Zaid ( of “Ratcat”)
- 'Nowhere Fast / Head In The Jam (1991), (Waterfront Records, Damp163), recorded at Electric Ave. Nov 1990, with Adam Chapman (Mixed bat Reciprocal Studios Seattle by Mark Arm of Mudhoney and Jack Endino of Sub Pop)

Mini LP

- The Hub (1990), (Waterfront, Damp142), recorded at Tracking Station, Sept 1990, produced by Stu Spasm (of Lubricated Goat). Tracks: The Melting Hour, Rattler, Erotic Auto Accident, Super Charged, Creepy Crawl, The Hub.

Mini CD

- Spinout (1992), (Survival), Tracks: Bladder Mouth, Crack in Her Eye, Kill Kylie, Spinout.

CD

- Busted (1993) (Hippy Knight), Tracks: 7.30PM, Busted, Cease to Squirm, Cut it Out, Metal Gibber, Monoblaster, Point of no Return, Poor Henry, Track Trauma, Young Bloke Blues

Compilations

- Fresh from the Womb (1992), (Magnet), (10" mini LP). One track: Crack in Her Eye
- Various - Self Mutilation Volume Three (1993), (Hippy Knight Records, Creep 012) (USA), (7", EP, Sampler). One track: "Shit for Brains" (recorded late 1992 at Troy Studios, originally recorded by The Bastards).

== Bibliography ==
- Spencer, Chris, Nowarra, Zbig & McHenry, Paul: "The Who's Who of Australian Rock", The Five Mile Press, 5th Ed, 2002.
