= Brother Brick =

Australian punk rock band

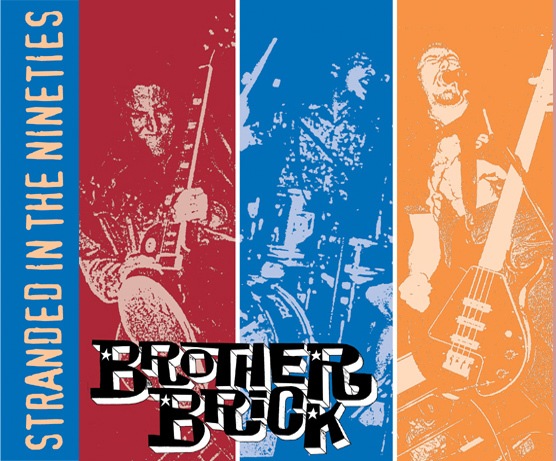
- Front cover of the Brother Brick compilation album

Background information
- Origin: Sydney, New South Wales, Australia
- Genres: Rock, punk rock
- Years active: 1991–2000
- Labels: Dog Meat Records Bang! Records Estrus Records
- Past members: Stewart Cunningham; Mikey J Stephenson; Kurt Anderson; Craig Jackson; Scott Nash; Jason Curley; Ashley Thomson

Brother Brick were an Australian punk rock band formed in Sydney in 1991. Led by future Leadfinger member Stewart Cunningham, the band released many 7" vinyl singles and 1 album in its time and contained members of many other successful Australian bands.

== History ==
The original line-up of Brother Brick was formed following the demise of The Proton Energy Pills from Wollongong and The Horny Toads from Sydney and featured former Protons guitarist Stewart Leadfinger Cunningham and former Horny Toads bass player Kurt Anderson and Drummer, Mikey J Stephenson. The Horny Toads were originally formed in Brisbane but moved to Sydney in 1988 and over the next 2 years they played many gigs with The Proton Energy Pills at venues such as The Lansdowne Hotel, The Journos Club and the Hopetoun Hotel. Both bands were 5-piece 'rock' bands and had much in common musically being inspired by many of the same seminal acts Radio Birdman, Blue Öyster Cult and The MC5. Other members of these two bands also went on to play in The Dubrovniks, Tumblweed and Leadfinger.

After previously playing in classic 5-piece 'Detroit' style rock bands the 3 founding members of Brother Brick made a conscious decision to play a different style of music to their previous bands. Keeping to the stripped back line up and inspired by bands such as X, The Eastern Dark, The Saints, Motörhead, The Wipers and Hüsker Dü all three members shared vocal duties and contributed to the songwriting. They sought out a more edgier and original style of rock that also took in elements of punk and 1960s blues rock such as Cream and Hendrix. They played live regularly in Sydney mostly at smaller pub venues like The Evil Star, The Lansdowne Hotel, The Vic on the Park Hotel and the Manly Vale Hotel but were ignored by the bigger venues and booking agents. Brother Brick made the long trips to Melbourne and Brisbane many times playing with like minded bands such as The Powder Monkeys, Freeloaders, Splatterheads and Asteroid B-612 and scoring support spots with the likes of Nomeansno, Deniz Tek, The Hitmen and The Celibate Rifles. This line up of Brother Brick had built up a solid live reputation and a reputation for no holds barred attitude but split up in 1994 following the release of a CD EP and two 7" singles, most notably the 'Chokito Bar' 7" on Dog Meat Records.

The following year Cunningham resumed Brother Brick with a new line up that included Scott Nash Asteroid B-612 on Bass and Craig Jackson on Drums. Continuing with the 3-piece format but with Cunningham taking over all vocal duties, this line-up of the band did not play live very often and instead focused on preparing to record what would become Brother Brick's only album, the prophetically titled A Portable Altamont. The album was recorded on a shoe string budget at Powerhouse Studio in Waterloo, Sydney but the release delayed whilst Nash and Cunningham focused on their duties with Asteroid B-612 - Cunningham having officially joined that band following the demise of the original Brother Brick. Further delays were caused when first Nash and then Jackson both left the band and the subsequent loss of the master CD of the album stalled the existence of the band completely in 1997. It was not until almost 2 years later when Cunningham found a cassette copy of the master CD that the band reconvened with Jay Curley (Tumbleweed, The Proton Energy Pills) on bass and Ashley Thomson (The Kelpies, The Panadolls) on drums. There had been considerable interest in the band from Europe and US during the unfortunate hiatus and this gave the band new life and enabled the release of the album and a bunch of singles in the US and Europe. This final line up of Brother Brick failed to record but played live regularly in support of the new releases. They supported touring bands like Dead Moon, Zeke, Jad Fair and played with local acts like The Powder Monkeys, The Onyas and The Bloodsucking Freaks. A Portable Altamont was well received by critics and fans, with a few of the songs that were written back in the first lineup of the band finally seeing a proper recorded release. Brother Brick played their final gig in June 2000 at the Zetland Hotel in Sydney.

In 2006, Melbourne-based record label Off the Hip released a double CD retrospective on the band that included all of their studio recordings and many unreleased demo's, live recordings and extensive liner notes. The release was titled Stranded in the Nineties, a phrase taken from the game of Cricket that refers to a player almost making a century but running out of time and batting partners, it was chosen to reflect the bands status as terminal underachievers, a virtually unknown group playing a distinctly Australian style of high energy rock'n'roll that failed to register a blip in Australia during a decade that was overrun by imported grunge, slacker rock and Nirvana wannabes.

== Personnel ==
1991–2000: Stewart Leadfinger Cunningham (guitar, vocals)

1991–1994 : Kurt Anderson - Bass, Mikey J Stephenson – Drums

1994–1996: Scott Nash – Bass, Craig Jackson – Drums

1998–2000: Jay Curley – Bass, Ashley Thomson - Drums

== Discography ==
- Getting Beyond a Shit Cd EP 1993 Space Beer Records
- Chokito Bar 7" single 1993 Dog Meat Records
- Rock Action Split 7" single with Asteroid B-612 1994 Brain Salad Surgery Records
- A Portable Altamont CD Album 1999 Hellfire Club Records
- The Same/Chip on My Shoulder 7" single 2000 Rockin House Records
- No Turning Back 7" single 2000 Estrus Records
- See You Tonight 7" Single 2000 Bang Records
- Stranded in the Nineties 2xCD Compilation 2007 Off the Hip Records

Compilations

- Take Your Vitamins and Say your Prayers (Track - Hotshot) 1993 Shock Records
- Self Mutilation Vol 4 7" vinyl Ep 1997 Hippy Knight Records
- Rock’n’Roll Soldiers Comp CD 2001 (track "See You Tonight")
- I’m In Love With That Song - Replacements Tribute Comp CD 1999 (track "Color Me Impressed")
