= Massappeal =

- Origin: Sydney, New South Wales, Australia
- Genres: Hardcore punk
- Years active: 1985–1994
- Labels: Waterfront; Survival/Sony; Shagpile/Shock
- Past members: Brett Curotta; Darren Gilmour; Kevin McCrear; Randy Reimann; Alex Nikolzew (p.k.a. Tubby Wadsworth); Sean Fonti; David Ross; Peter Allen; Adrielle Spence; Ashley Chatto (d. 2012); Andy Coplin; James Meek

Massappeal were an Australian hardcore punk band founded in early 1985 by mainstays Brett Curotta (guitar) and Randy Reimann (vocals). They released four studio albums, Nobody Likes a Thinker (1986), Jazz (1989), The Mechanic (1992) and Nommo Anagonno (1994), before disbanding late in 1994.

== History ==
Massappeal were a hardcore punk band formed in Sydney in early 1985 by Brett Curotta on guitar (ex-Bedspreads), Darren Gilmour on drums (ex-Rocks, Climate of Fear), Kevin McCrear on bass guitar and Randy Reimann on lead vocals. According to Australian musicologist, Ian McFarlane, they "mixed breakneck punk tempos with unrelenting heavy metal guitar riffs to arrive at a potent and rough-hewn sound."

The band discovered hardcore punk from the United States and United Kingdom via tape trading and reading zines. The band's first gig was on Mardi-Gras night in 1985 in Sydney. They first made their music available-a live taping-on a compilation tape for a fanzine, Zit. Waterfront Records asked the band to record a demo in May 1986 and an album, Nobody Likes a Thinker, which was released in December 1986. It was reviewed positively in Australian music magazines and daily newspapers. The album reached the number one spot on the Australian indie charts. The band toured Australia, first with fellow Sydney band and label mates Hard-Ons, and later with the US band DRI. Gilmour left the band in 1987 and Alex Nikolzew (p.k.a. Tubby Wadsworth), from Kings Cross, Festers Fanatics and Killing Time, took over on drums.

After Tubby left the band in 1988, Curotta reached out to Dave Ross (ex-Civil Dissident, Vicious Circle, Nobody's Victim) to fill the drumming seat. Ross re-located his home base from Melbourne to Sydney and soon after Sean Fonti (ex-My Heart Bleeds for You) replaced McCrear on bass guitar. During this transition period, the Massappeal sound developed a slower, more complex intensity that framed the musical stylings of much of their follow up album Jazz (1989). Later that year, Massappeal toured nationally supporting Rollins Band. The band's sound continued to develop, maintaining the intensity of its thrash based roots while exploring more dynamic shifts in sound, incorporating light and space to complement heavy prog-rock moments. Prior to recording The Mechanic (1991) Ross left and was replaced by Peter Allen (ex-Terrible Virtue). Fonti left soon after to form Caligula with his brother Jamie and Ross on drums. Ross would later form Sydney based outfit Bob with McCrear on bass guitar.

== Members ==
- Brett Curotta (guitar)
- Darren Gilmour (drums)
- Kevin McCrear (bass guitar)
- Randy Reimann (vocals)
- Alex Nikolzew (drums)
- Sean Fonti (bass guitar)
- David Ross (drums)
- Peter Allen (drums)
- Adrielle Spence (bass)
- Ashley Chatto (guitar)
- Andy Coplin (bass guitar)
- James Meek (bass guitar)
- Alex (Tubby) Wadsworth (drums)

== Discography ==
=== Albums ===
- Nobody Likes a Thinker (October 1986) Waterfront (DAMP 39)
- Jazz (1989)
- The Mechanic (1992)
- Nommo Anagonno (1994)

=== Extended plays ===
- The Zesty Charismatic Personality Chamber (January 1994)
