= The Proton Energy Pills =

Australian punk rock band

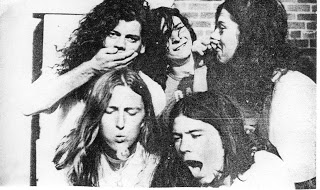

Background information
- Origin: Wollongong, New South Wales, Australia
- Genres: Rock, punk rock, grunge
- Years active: 1986-1990
- Label: Waterfront Records Bang! Records
- Past members: Stewart Cunningham; David Curley; Richard Lewis; Lenny Curley; Jason Curley; Terry Callan; Dave Achille
- Website: Steel City Sound PEP

The Proton Energy Pills were an Australian punk rock band formed in the city of Wollongong, New South Wales in 1986. The band released two vinyl singles and a vinyl EP in its time and is considered a very seminal and influential group as its members went on to play in many successful Australian bands over the next 25 years.

== History ==
Australian Musicologist, Ian McFarlane writes that "The Proton Energy Pills comprised Dave Curley (vocals), Lenny Curley (guitar), Jay Curley (bass), Stewy Leadfinger Cunningham (guitar) and Richie Lewis (drums). They got their name from the American animated series Roger Ramjet (the proton energy pills gave the title character his extraordinary strength). The band played a form of heavy retro-grunge that drew on American bands like Blue Öyster Cult, MC5 and Mudhoney for inspiration. Local bands that the Pills aspired to included Radio Birdman, The Celibate Rifles and The New Christs. Sydney independent label Waterfront issued two Proton Energy Pills singles, `Survival'/`Symmetry' (September 1989) and `(Less than I) Spend'/`Strawberry Patch' (March 1990), and the mini-album Proton Energy Pills(September 1990)."

The band formed whilst most of its members were at school in Wollongong and learnt how to play at parties covering their favourite songs by bands like The Ramones, The Stooges, Flamin Groovies and Radio Birdman. Their first gig took place on 15 August 1987 at the Wollongong Ironworkers Club and the band became known for their long hair and super distorted sounds. Later the band would start to play in Sydney more regularly and would take on Steve Pavlovic as their manager and sign with Waterfront Records and release two influential 7" singles. The Proton Energy Pills supported for Dinosaur Jr on the New South Wales and Victorian legs their first Australian tour in 1989 and J Mascis produced the A-side of the Protons second single - a song called Less than I Spend. Both singles sold very well and made it to the top of the Sydney Independent Charts at the time. The band also scored the Australian tour support for American band Mudhoney in their first visit to Australia in early 1990. Proton Energy Pills also played with P.I.L., The Buzzcocks, Rollins Band and The Hoodoo Gurus and supported many of their local heroes including The Celibate Rifles, The Hitmen, Hard-ons and Lime Spiders.

The Protons disbanded in mid-1990 citing musical differences after the recording of a five-track 12" EP at Sydney's Electric Avenue Studios with Phil Punch and Kent Steedman from the Celibate Rifles producing.

== Post-breakup ==
Following the split of the band, members of the Proton Energy Pills went on to play in many successful bands including Brother Brick, Zambian Goatherders, Tumbleweed, Leadfinger, Asteroid B-612 and Challenger-7, The Yes-Men, Richie & the Creeps, Brut 66 and The Pink Fits. Despite their limited output, the significance of the band would come to light in hindsight and they came to be considered a pre-grunge seminal act that paved the way for an 'unearthing' of underground rock in Australia in the 1990s. In their hometown of Wollongong, 'the Protons' (as they are known) played many all-ages gigs mostly due to the philosophy of frontman David Curley who in his role as youth social worker with Wollongong Council was very committed to engaging the region's youth in music and art. As a result, the band are revered for inspiring many young people to pick up instruments and form bands. In 2007, Spanish Label Bang! Records released a gatefold CD retrospective of the band's music including extensive liner notes on the band's history and impact. The band also featured on Tales From the Australian Underground retrospective which was released in 2006 on Feel Presents Record Label, the following quote on the significance of The Proton Energy Pills is taken from that release:

In March 2021, Wollongong based record label Music Farmers re-issued the studio recordings of The Proton Energy Pills on deluxe gatefold 12" vinyl LP. The record made an appearance on the ARIA vinyl sales chart at #11 on 22 March 2021.

== Discography ==
- Survival/Symmetry 7" single 1989 Waterfront Records
- Less Than I Spend/Strawberry Patch 7" single 1990 Waterfront Records
- Proton Energy Pills S/T 12" EP 1990 Waterfront Records
- Rocket to Tarrawanna CD Album 2007 Bang! Records
- The Proton Energy Pills Vinyl LP Album 2021 Music Farmers Records

Compilations

- Skate Hard Compilation 1990 track "Symmetry" Festival Records
- Tales from the Australian Underground Vol 2 2006 Feel Presents Records
