= Nunchukka Superfly =

Australian punk rock band

- Origin: Sydney, New South Wales, Australia
- Genres: Punk rock
- Years active: 1993–present
- Members: Peter Black; Ray Ahn; Julien Crendal
- Past members: Joel Ellis; Pete Allen; James McCann

Nunchukka Superfly are an Australian punk rock band from Sydney. It was formed by guitarist Peter Black and bass player Ray Ahn from Hard-Ons with Pete Allen of Massappeal on drums, just before the announcement of the Hard-Ons' break up, in late 1993. James McCann of the Sydney band Harpoon joined as vocalist in 1994. This version of the band recorded an album in mid-1995 that was never released. After performing at festivals such as Livid and the Big Day Out, McCann and Allen left. Joel Ellis joined as the band's drummer and Black took over vocals.

== Discography ==
List of albums, with selected details
Title	Details
Nunchukka Superfly	Released: 1999; Format: CD; Label: One Way Street (OWSLP1)
There Are No Accidents ... Just Fuckwits	Released: July 2001; Format: CD; Label: High Beam Music (HBM015)
III	Released: October 2004; Format: CD; Label: Shock (2) (NS-003)
Live At The Tote	Released: 2007; Format: CD; Label: We Empty Rooms (WER#6); Note: Recorded live in August 2006
If Ya Not Careful With Electricity It Will Kill Ya	Released: 2008; Format: CD; Label: Chatterbox Records (CB 062)
Open Your Eyes to Smoke	Released: 2014; Format: digital, CD, LP; Label: Citadel (CITCD578)
Aussie Exorcism / Don't Tap Me On the Shoulder	Released: March 2021; Format: digital, 2×LP; Label: Tym Records (TYM062)
Nunchukka Superfly 95	Released: April 2024; Format: digital, LP; Label: Cheersquad Records & Tapes (CRT202); Note: Recorded in Camperdown in 1995
If You Go Down I Go Down Too	Released: July 2025; Format: digital, LP; Label: Cheersquad Records & Tapes (CRT269); Australian Indie Charts: #4
