= Leadfinger =

Australian rock and roll band

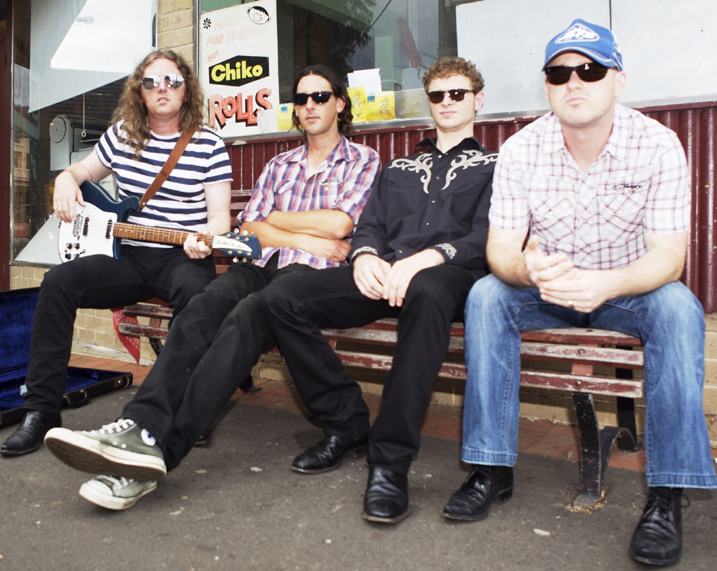
- Leadfinger at Balgownie Chip Shop in 2011

Background information
- Origin: Wollongong, New South Wales, Australia
- Genres: Rock, power pop, punk rock, blues
- Years active: 2006–present
- Label: Golden Robot Records Previously with Citadel Records Bang! Records
- Members: Stewart Cunningham; Reggie Screen; Michael Boyle; Stuart Wilson
- Past members: Wayne Stokes; Stephen O'Brien; Dillon Hicks
- Website: leadfinger.com.au

Leadfinger (pronounced "Led-finger") is an Australian guitar rock band formed in Wollongong, New South Wales, in 2006 by Glasgow-born singer and guitarist Stewart "Leadfinger" Cunningham. The band has released six albums to date, with the most recent released in February 2022 through Golden Robot Records.

== Background ==
Leadfinger founder Stewart Cunningham has been a prominent figure in the Australian underground music scene for over 20 years. He began his career as a guitarist with the pre-grunge Wollongong band The Proton Energy Pills. In the late 1980s, he moved to Sydney, where he spent the 1990s playing in seminal underground guitar bands, including Asteroid B-612, Brother Brick, and Challenger-7. He also had a stint in Melbourne with The Yes-Men, a band formed by Sean Greenway (formerly of God and The Freeloaders). Each of these bands released critically acclaimed albums in Australia, the United States, Japan, and Europe.

Upon returning to live near his hometown of Wollongong in 2005, Cunningham began performing live as 'Leadfinger', focusing on open tuning and slide guitar-driven songs. The first three Leadfinger albums were released through Bang! Records, a Spanish Basque independent label specialising in underground Australian rock, including The Beasts of Bourbon, The Scientists, and The Drones. The band's album No Room at the Inn was later released through Australian label Citadel Records, whose legacy spans 30 years and includes many of Leadfinger's musical influences, such as Deniz Tek, Died Pretty, and the Lime Spiders.

The name 'Leadfinger' was originally a pen name for Cunningham, originating from an incident when his brother shot him with an air rifle at age 14. The lead pellet became embedded in his left index finger and required surgery for removal. Future bandmates began calling him 'Leadfinger' in jest, suggesting that the unusual injury had somehow influenced his guitar style. Cunningham has stated that the name was also chosen as a homage to Mississippi Delta blues legend Lead Belly, as his original intention was to perform solo under the name.

Cunningham continues a long tradition of Scottish Australian rock musicians and songwriters, following in the footsteps of the Young family (members of AC/DC and The Easybeats), Jimmy Barnes, Bon Scott, Colin Hay, Karl Broadie, James McCann, and others.

== Music ==
Leadfinger experiment with a wide variety of musical styles but are predominantly recognised for their fusion of guitar-driven high-energy rock, power pop, and 1970s punk rock, drawing comparisons to acts such as The Replacements, Radio Birdman, and The Saints. The band draws from the rich vein underground guitar music, spanning genres from the 1970s rock and punk eras to the classic works of Rolling Stones and Bob Dylan in the late 1960s and earlier.

Their instrumentation reflects a broad musical palette, incorporating electric guitars, 12- and 6-string acoustic guitars, alternate tunings, slide techniques, dynamic bass lines, driving drums, and harmony vocals. Leadfinger’s music embodies a soulful, timeless brand of rock and roll rooted in the songwriting of frontman Stewart Cunningham (singer-guitarist) and characterised by the use of vintage equipment and amplification.

Cunningham’s compositions blend lyrical craftsmanship with raw energy, paying homage to the band’s influences while maintaining a distinctive contemporary edge.

== History ==
=== 2005–2008 (The Floating Life) ===
Following a four-year hiatus from music after the death of Yes-Men bandmate Sean Greenway in 2001 and the band’s abrupt dissolution, Stewart Cunningham resumed songwriting in 2005. A series of new demos, recorded primarily at his home studio, formed the basis of Leadfinger’s debut album, The Floating Life. Released in mid-2007 via Spanish label Bang! Records, the album’s production was facilitated by the label’s prior collaborations with Cunningham’s earlier bands, Brother Brick, The Yes-Men, and Asteroid B-612.

Leadfinger’s inaugural live performance occurred in February 2006 at Wollongong's underground venue The Oxford Tavern. Cunningham later described the solo set as "...a musician used to playing with a band fumbling through a set of songs in a shocked and disjointed manner". By mid-2006, drummer Stephen O’Brien (formerly of The Unheard). joined for sporadic performances. The band’s first full lineup solidified on New Year’s Eve 2006 at the same venue with the addition of bassist Wayne Stokes (formerly of Thumlock).

This three-piece lineup performed intermittently, including the official album launch for The Floating Life album at Sydney’s Hopetoun Hotel on 29 July 2007. During this period, the group recorded new material in two sessions at a farmhouse in Tongarra, near Macquarie Pass. These tracks later appeared on the Through the Cracks CD EP (2008, Musicfarmers Records) and the album Rich Kids (2009, Bang! Records). Both releases were produced and mixed by Cunningham at his home studio, Leadfinger's Rendezvous Studio.

The original lineup disbanded after their final performance at Melbourne's The Tote Hotel on 15 August 2008, during the two-night Bang! Records Festival.

=== 2008–2009 (Rich Kids) ===
The current and most prominent Leadfinger lineup coalesced in late 2008 with the addition of guitarist Michael Boyle (formerly of Mudlungs) bassist Adam “Reggie” Screen, and drummer Dillon Hicks (formerly of Zambian Goat Herders). Though their first official performance as a quartet occurred at Sydney's The Annandale Hotel in January 2009, Hicks had previously drummed for Leadfinger at Melbourne shows in 2008, while Boyle had collaborated with Cunningham in an acoustic duo format at smaller venues since 2006. This iteration of the band marked a turning point, fostering a stronger camaraderie and consistent live presence that solidified their musical direction.

In 2009, the Tongarra farmhouse recordings by the original lineup were released as the album Rich Kids—titled after the track "Rich Kids Can’t Play Rock ’n’ Roll"—via Bang! Records on vinyl and CD. Critics praised the album’s raw, distinctly Australian sound, likening it to The Saints and Radio Birdman. Patrick Emery, writing for Australian music website Mess+Noise, declared: "...Rich Kids Can't Play Rock 'n' Roll but Leadfinger can!" The album featured enduring live staples such as "Fade Your Brilliance" and the title track.

Rich Kids also included covers showcasing the band’s influences: a rendition of Rory Gallagher's "Bad Penny" (appearing on both formats), Roky Erickson's "I Think of Demons" (vinyl exclusive), and a version of The Saints' "Ghost Ships" on the CD release.

=== 2010–2011 (We Make the Music) ===
During winter 2010, Leadfinger recorded their third album at Surry Hills' Big Jesus Burger Studio in Sydney. Working with engineers JP Fung and Brent Williams (of The New Christs), the band utilised vintage analogue technology, recording onto 2-inch tape and mixing on a classic Neve console. The resulting sound paid homage to 1970s-era influences such as the Rolling Stones' Exile on Main St. and Big Star's early albums. We Make the Music was issued on CD and digital formats through Wollongong label Impedance Records, while Bang! Records handled the vinyl release.

The album’s title and titular track drew inspiration from a scene in the 1971 film Willy Wonka & the Chocolate Factory (starring Gene Wilder), emphasising artistic integrity over corporate and media manipulation. The phrase “We are the music makers and we are the dreamers of the dreams” originated from Arthur O'Shaughnessy's 1873 poem Ode.

Initial recording sessions yielded enough material for a double album, though label reservations led to a streamlined 12-track release. Track listings varied significantly between formats. The album launched on 19 May 2011 at Sydney's The Annandale Hotel, with i-94 Bar hailing it as “a bona-fide Australian classic”.

In November 2011, surplus recordings from the sessions were released as the limited-edition CD EP I Belong to the Band. Two music videos—for the title track and the CD-exclusive song "Fourteen"—were produced by Rob Stephenson to promote the album.

=== 2012–2015 (No Room at the Inn) ===
In late 2011, Leadfinger began developing material for their fourth album, No Room at the Inn, driven by Stewart Cunningham’s songwriting on a recently acquired Epiphone acoustic 12-string guitar. Tracks such as "The Wandering Man," "Gimme the Future," "Pretty Thing," and "The Other Ones" relied on stripped-back three-chord progressions, elevated by the guitar’s distinctive tonal character. Due to budget constraints, the band recorded foundational tracks at Sydney's Defwolf studio in April 2012, with overdubs, vocals, and mixing completed by Cunningham at his home studio, Leadfinger's Rendezvous Studio. The self-funded album, produced for under A$5,000, was released in February 2013 through Australian label Citadel Records, earning critical praise for its raw yet polished execution.

Critics lauded the album’s blend of raw energy and craftsmanship. A four-star review noted:

Most great rock 'n’ roll is made out on the fringes but this latest album from Australian veteran Stewart 'Leadfinger' Cunningham packs such a punch that it deserves to come out from the underground. Fans of bands from The Masters' Apprentices to HITS will love its greasy swagger, sure-footed songwriting and a sound that's both rich and raw. This is a deep seam, back to the classic Stones records of the late '60s on songs like You're So Strange, with its gospel-charged backing vocal from Chloe West. Gimme The Future sports searing guitar work that threatens to shred speakers, and Cruel City pumps with the kind of intensity once found on Radio Birdman records. But there is also room for banjo on the dusty roads of the title tune, and the intense The Lonely Road is dedicated to Rory Gallagher. Anyone who ever heard the sparks flying on a record by the late Irish bluesman will recognise a soul brother in Leadfinger and his passionate tunes. (4 Stars)

To promote the album, Leadfinger toured Australia in March–April 2013, supporting Detroit-born musician Deniz Tek (of Radio Birdman and New Race), a fellow Citadel Records artist.

=== 2016–2019 (Friday Night Heroes) ===
Leadfinger released their fifth studio album, Friday Night Heroes, on 14 July 2016. Recorded in mid-2015 at the now-defunct Linear Recording Studio in Leichhardt, NSW, the album was mixed and co-produced by Wade Keighran of Wolf & Cub. Released via Brisbane-based label Conquest of Noise on vinyl and CD, the band promoted the album with a 10-date Australian tour across four states in July–August 2016.

In October 2017, Leadfinger undertook their first overseas performances with a 14-date European tour, including shows in France, Switzerland, and Spain.

In early 2018, guitarist and principal songwriter Stewart Cunningham was diagnosed with stage 3 lung cancer. Following extensive treatment, including a pneumonectomy later that year, the band’s activities were suspended due to post-surgical complications. After a prolonged recovery, Cunningham resumed rehearsals with the group in late 2019.

In November 2019, Leadfinger self-released the La Banda En España CD/digital EP, featuring live recordings from their 2017 tour in Dénia, Spain. The release included a standout electric 12-string guitar rendition of the live favourite "You Wear It Well," a cover of Rod Stewart's 1972 track from his album Never A Dull Moment.

=== 2020–present (Silver & Black) ===
In early 2020, Leadfinger signed an exclusive licensing agreement with Australian label Golden Robot Records to distribute their catalogue worldwide via digital platforms.

After a three-year hiatus from live performances, the band returned to the stage at Marrickville Bowling Club in June 2021.

Their sixth studio album, Silver & Black, was released on 25 February 2022. Recorded in late 2020 at Botany’s Rancom Street Studio (owned by Garth Porter) with producer Brent Clark, the album was issued on double 12-inch vinyl, CD, and digital formats through Golden Robot Records. Critics praised the release, with i-94 Bar’s Col Gray declaring:

Top to bottom – every song on “Silver & Black” is a winner, each rich with colour and diversity. If you thought “Friday Night Heroes” was good, “Silver & Black” goes one step further, and stands as Leadfinger's magnum opus – and it should rightfully open new doors for the band. After more than four years – Leadfinger are back – rejuvenated, reinvigorated, and armed with a stunning collection of new rock ‘n’ roll songs. Special when lit and then some. Get on board. (5 Stars)

The band played various dates in New South Wales, Australian Capital Territory and Victoria in 2022 to promote the release of the album.

The band toured New South Wales, the Australian Capital Territory, and Victoria in 2022 to promote the album. In February 2023, drummer Dillon Hicks was replaced by Stuart Wilson (formerly of The New Christs, Lime Spiders, and Loose Pills). Wilson debuted with Leadfinger on 11 March 2023, supporting Nick Barker and the Reptiles at Sydney's The Bridge Hotel in Rozelle.

== Personnel ==
=== Current members ===
- Stewart Cunningham – lead vocals, acoustic guitar, electric guitar, slide guitar, harmonica, mandolin (2006–present)
- Reggie Screen – bass guitar (2008–present)
- Michael Boyle – electric guitar, backing vocals (2008–present)
- Stuart Wilson – drums (2023–present)

=== Former members ===
- Wayne Stokes – bass guitar (2006–2008)
- Stephen O’Brien – drums (2006–2008)
- Dillon Hicks – drums (2008–2022)

== Discography of Leadfinger ==
=== Studio albums ===
- The Floating Life (2007) – Bang! Records
- Rich Kids (2009) – Bang! Records
- We Make the Music (2011) – Bang! Records/Impedance Records
- No Room at the Inn (2013) – Citadel Records
- Friday Night Heroes (2016) – Conquest of Noise
- Silver & Black (2022) – Golden Robot Records

=== Extended plays and singles ===
- Through the Cracks (2008) – Musicfarmers
- I Belong to the Band (2011) – Impedance Records
- Ripped Genes/Analogue Dreams (2012) – Unpopular Records (CD self-released by the band)
- "Cheer Squad" (2016) – Conquest of Noise (7-inch vinyl and digital single)
- La Banda en España (2019) – Unpopular Records (self-released by the band)

=== Compilation appearances ===
- "Swept Back" on Up North/Down Under (2010) – Bootleg Booze Records
- "December Runaway" on Rock Against Bullshit Xmas Comp (2010) – Rock Against Bullshit Records
- "Just Like Fire, Would" on Let Me Turn You On (2012) – Easy Action Records
- "Left Wing Yule" on Rock Against Bullshit Xmas Comp (2012) – Rock Against Bullshit Records
