= Bang! Records =

Spanish rock record label

- Founded: 1998
- Founder: Juan Mari Iturrarte; Gorka Munster
- Genre: Swamp rock Garage rock Punk blues Noise rock
- Country of origin: Spain
- Location: Basque Country
- Official website: bang-records.net

Bang! Records is a Spanish record label from the Basque Country, which was formed in 1998 by Gorka Munster and Juan-Mari Iturrarte. The label has a primary focus on artists from Melbourne, Australia, and New York City's swamp, noise and punk blues music scene. Acts among the Bang! Records roster include The Beasts Of Bourbon, The Scientists, Rowland S. Howard of The Birthday Party, Brian Henry Hooper, The Drones, The Gun Club and Jeffrey Lee Pierce.

== History ==
Bang! Records was originally conceived by Gorka Munster with the aim of releasing 7-inch vinyl singles. The first release appeared in 1998 with a 7-inch single release by Senor No. This was followed by singles from Brother Brick, The Hellacopters and The Nomads. With the addition of Juan-Mari Iturrarte, the label expanded to include gatefold vinyl LP releases and reissues with a growing focus on the Australian swamp blues music scene.

To mark the label's ten year anniversary, the Big Bang! Festival was held August 15 and 16 2008, at Collingwood's The Tote Hotel. The festival featured performances by Kim Salmon & The Surrealists, The Kill Devil Hills, Stu Thomas, Brian Henry Hooper, Spencer P. Jones, Hugo Race and others.

== Artists ==
- The Beasts Of Bourbon
- The Scientists
- Rowland S. Howard
- The Gun Club
- Spencer P. Jones
- Brian Henry Hooper
- The Drones
- The Chrome Cranks
- Hugo Race
- Kim Salmon and the Surrealists
- Five Dollar Priest
- Woman
- Ian Rilen
- The Bakelite Age
- Jerry Teel and the Big City Stompers
- Jeffrey Lee Pierce
- The Hellacopters
- Boris Sujdovic
- The Devastations
- Sacred Cowboys
- The Meanies
- The Kill Devil Hills
- The Green Mist
- Stu Thomas
- The Nomads
- Dimi Dero, Inc.
- Penny Ikinger
- The Butcher Shop
- Tiger By The Tail
- Black Pony Express
- The Celibate Rifles
- The Proton Energy Pills
- The Seminal Rats
- James McCann
- Senor No
- The Voyeurs
- Brother Brick
- The Yes Men
- Bored!
- Leadfinger
- The Scoundrelles
- Asteroid B-612
- Los Dingos
- The Slappers
- The Flaming Stars
- The Powder Monkeys

== See also ==
- List of record labels
