= B612 =

B612 may refer to:

- B 612 (The Little Prince), an asteroid in the novella The Little Prince
- B612 Foundation, a non-profit formed for planetary defense against asteroid and other near-Earth object (NEO) impacts
- Asteroid B-612, an Australian hard rock band
- 46610 Bésixdouze, an asteroid named for the home of The Little Prince
