= The Stupids (band) =

English hardcore punk band

- Origin: Ipswich, England
- Genres: Skate punk
- Years active: 1984–1989; 2008–present
- Labels: Children of the Revolution, Vinyl Solution, Boss Tuneage
- Members: Tommy Stupid; Marty Tuff; Johnny Stallion
- Past members: Wolfie Retard; Ed Shred; Steve Snax; Pauly Pizza; Rossi O'Schmitt

The Stupids are an English hardcore punk band formed in the 1980s by Tom Withers.

== Career ==
Ed Shred performing in Vienna in 1987

Formed in Ipswich, England in the mid 1980s, The Stupids released four albums and six EPs, and recorded three sessions for John Peel's BBC Radio 1 show in the 1980s, and toured the United States (with Ludichrist) and Australia (the Hard-Ons) as well as Europe, the United Kingdom, and, most recently, Japan.

The band have featured on various CD re-issues, compilation albums (e.g. Sounds and the U.S. skate magazine, Thrasher), collector singles, and BBC session releases released by Strange Fruit.

The Stupids were featured in the 22 August 1987 edition of the NME about the band and the UK skate scene, and also made the front page.

A live video tape, Drive-In Hit Movie, was released shortly after the band broke up in 1989.

== Post-break up ==
After the band split, Tommy Stupid went on to forge a new career in drum and bass as Klute. Of the other members, Wolfie Retard continued with Perfect Daze and Lovejunk, while Ed Shred continued with Sink (later Big Ray); both also played together in the band Chocolate. After a hiatus from live music, Ed went on to form K-Line, and later Dealing With Damage.

== Reunion ==
Tommy Stupid reformed the Stupids in 2008, with a new line-up. In June 2008, Boss Tuneage released a comprehensive reissues series of the Stupids, co-ordinating six CD and LP reissues of their entire back catalogue; four for release on the Boss Tuneage Retro Series imprint, the other two on Visible Noise.

In 2009, The Stupids released their first studio album in 20 years, The Kids Don't Like it, on Boss Tuneage.

2011 saw the release of Japanese Vacation on Waterslide Records, Boss Tuneage's sister label, to coincide with a tour of Japan. The band had to cancel their 2012 European tour because Tommy Stupid broke his leg.

Tommy Stupid, Marty Tuff & Wolfie Retard at Treetop Studios during the recording of Peruvian Vacation

== Members ==
- Tommy Stupid - drums/vocals/guitars
- Wolfie Retard - bass/vocals
- Marty Tuff - guitar
- Ed Shred - guitar/vocals/bass
- Gizz Butt - guitar
- Steve Snax - bass
- Pauly Pizza - bass
- Rossi O'Schmitt - bass (2008–2012)
- Wild Johnny Stallion (John Roscoe) - bass (2013–present)

with guest spots from:

- Stuey Q - bass
- Mitch - guitar
- Bobby Justice - vocals
- Dave Ross - vocals
- Chris Shary - vocals
- Ziggy - drums

== Discography ==
=== Albums ===
- Peruvian Vacation (Children of The Revolution Records - 1985)
- Retard Picnic (Children of The Revolution Records - 1986)
- Van Stupid (Vinyl Solution - 1987)
- Jesus Meets The Stupids (Vinyl Solution - 1988)
- The Kids Don't Like It album (Boss Tuneage - 2009)

=== EPs and singles ===
- Violent Nun 7-inch EP (Children of The Revolution Records - 1985)
- Eat 12-inch EP (As Frankfurter) (Vinyl Solution - 1987)
- Mail Order Only 7-inch EP (Vinyl Solution - 1987)
- The Peel Sessions 7-inch/12" EP (Strange Fruit - 1988)
- No Cheese! (The High-Way To Hell Tour Souvenir) 10-inch EP (Split Tour EP With The Hard-Ons) (Vinyl Solution/Waterfront Records - 1989)
- Wipe Out 7-inch EP (A PBJ Production - 1989)
- "Feel The Suck" 7-inch (Boss Tuneage - 2008)
- Japanese Vacation EP (Waterslide Records/Boss Tuneage - 2011)
- Demonstration Tape '89 7-inch EP (Alona's Dream - 2013)
