= Dealing With Damage =

British punk/melodic hardcore band

- Origin: London, England
- Genres: Punk rock, melodic hardcore, emo, post-hardcore
- Years active: 2015–present
- Labels: Serial Bowl, Little Rocket, Boss Tuneage, Brassneck
- Members: Ed Wenn; James Sherry; Andy Myers; Owen Cox; Steve Cox
- Past members: Paul Grier; Rich Matthews; Giles Davis; John Ruscoe
- Website: https://dealingwithdamage.com/

Dealing With Damage are a British five-piece punk rock band from London, England. The band was formed in 2015 by singer-songwriter/guitarist Ed Wenn (formerly of The Stupids) and drummer James Sherry (formerly of Done Lying Down). They have received coverage on sites such as Kerrang!, Louder Than War and Vive Le Rock and played with notable bands including Soulside, Moving Targets, the Messthetics, Ruts DC, Janus Stark, Zounds, Inner Terrestrials, Girls Against Boys and Eight Rounds Rapid.

The band have been likened to bands such as Fugazi, Rites of Spring, Soulside, Mission of Burma, Hüsker Dü, Buzzcocks, Down By Law, Toxic Reasons, Dag Nasty and Government Issue

== History ==
Formed in 2015, the band’s initial line up was Wenn, Sherry, guitarist Rich Matthews (all ex-K-Line) and bassist Giles Davis. Davis was replaced by Paul Grier (ex-Scum Children) during the recording of first EP Navigating The Middle Ground. The EP was released in 2016 and included a cover of an Iris DeMent song. Second EP Don’t Give Into Fear was produced and mixed by John Hannon (ex-Understand) and released on the Boss Tuneage label in 2017, after which John Ruscoe (ex-Perfect Daze/Sink) replaced Matthews on guitar.

Dealing With Damage’s debut album Ask The Questions was released on Little Rocket Records in 2020 - with a joint vinyl release by Rad Girlfriend Records (Dayton, Ohio, USA) and Carabrecol (Gran Canaria, Spain) - to positive reviews

The Home Security EP, recorded by John Hannon at No Recording studio, followed in 2020 and included a cover of the 13th Floor Elevators song, "Dust".

Dealing With Damage released their second LP Use The Daylight in February 2023, to universally positive reviews; the album included a tribute to John Hannon and a collaboration with 'menopause-core' trio Yootha Today, and featured new lead guitarist Andy Myers (ex-Down Love/Jerry Built).

Bassist Paul Grier moved out of London and eventually left the band in the autumn of 2023; he was replaced by Owen Cox who was recommended by Wenn's long-time musical collaborator, Steve Cox, who himself had recently become a permanent member of the band after playing keyboards on the first two albums. This new five-piece line-up went on a short UK tour in the summer of 2024 with Midway Still and recorded and released two split EPs that year with Dinosaur Skull and Moron Butler respectively.

Third album The London Particular was released in 2026 on Serial Bowl Records, to further positive reviews.

== Discography ==
=== Albums ===
- Ask The Questions, CD (Little Rocket Records, 2020)
- Ask More Questions, LP (Little Rocket/Rad Girlfriend/Carabrecol, 2021) [re-release with extra tracks]
- Use The Daylight, LP (Little Rocket/Rad Girlfriend, 2023)
- The London Particular, LP/CD (Serial Bowl Records, 2026)

=== EPs ===
- Navigating The Middle Ground (2016)
- Don’t Give Into Fear (Boss Tuneage, 2017)
- Home Security (Little Rocket Records, 2020)
- Dealing With Dinosaurs EP w/ Dinosaur Skull (Brassneck Records, 2024)
- Split EP w/ Moron Butler (2024)

=== Compilations ===
- 3EPs (2021) (self-released)

=== Compilation appearances ===
- “Speeding Up” on Rebellion Festival New Band (Introducing) Stage 2018 (JSNTGM Records, CD)
- “Making Plans For Misery” on The Scene That Would Not Die: Twenty Years Of Post-Millennial Punk In The UK (Engineer Records, 2021)
- “We Make Bombs To Feel Safe” on Punk For Ukraine Vol. #1(Grimace Records, 2022)
