= Shepherds Reign =

New Zealand heavy metal band

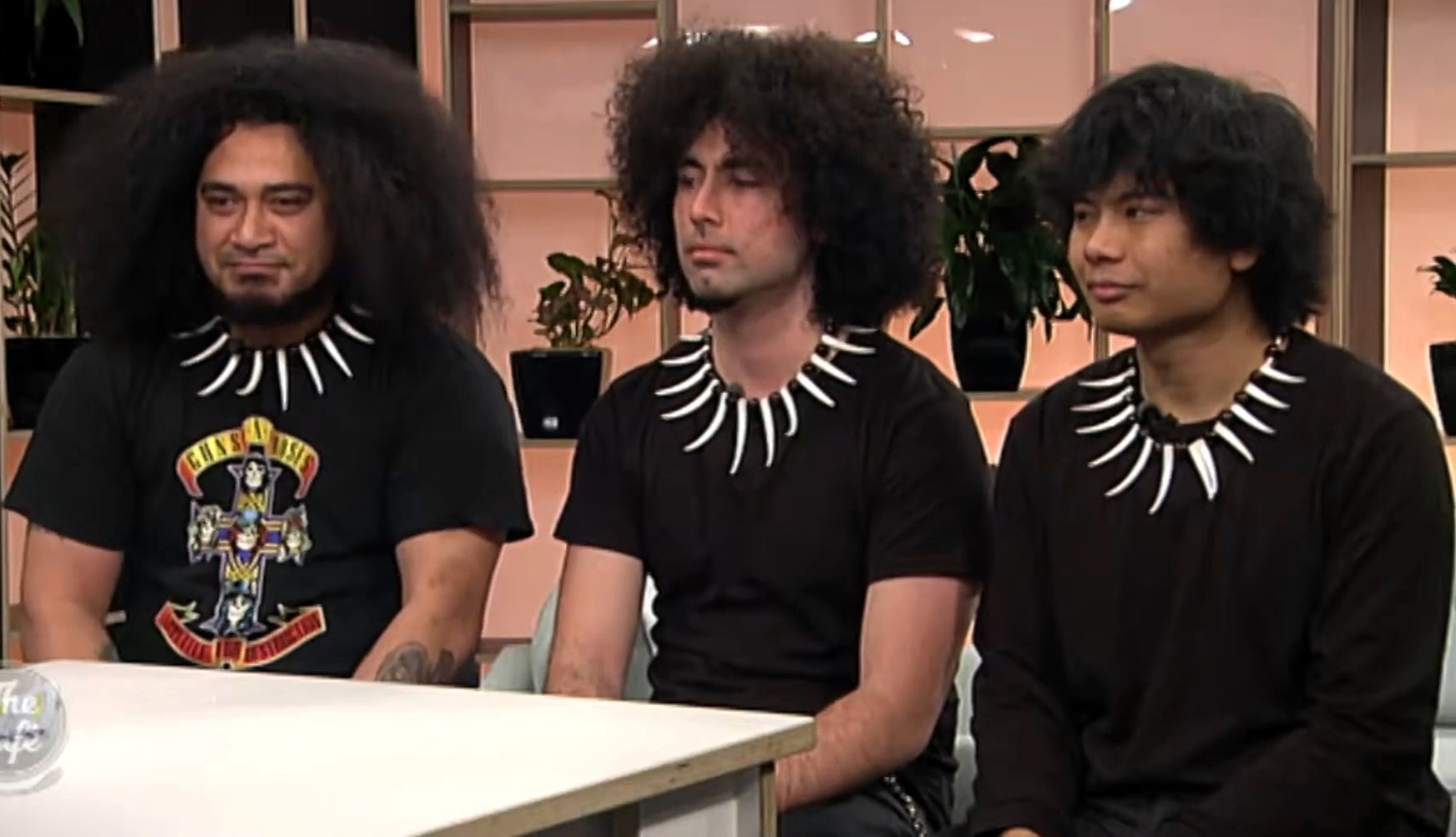
- Left to right: Filiva'a James, Oliver Leupolu, Gideon Voon in 2018

Background information
- Origin: Auckland, New Zealand
- Genres: Alternative metal, groove metal
- Years active: 2013–present
- Labels: Golden Robot Records
- Members: Filiva'a James; Oliver Leupolu; Joseph Oti-George; Shaymen Rameka; Gideon Voon

Shepherds Reign are a New Zealand-based heavy metal band. They have released two albums, a self-titled one in 2018 and Ala Mai in 2023.

== Background and influences ==
Two members of Shepherds Reign have a background in classical music. Lead singer Filiva'a James had begun classical music training, playing piano from the age of five. As a teenager, Oliver Leupolu had also learnt classical piano. Filiva'a James' interest in metal music goes back to when he at the age of five saw the Guns N' Roses music video for the song "November Rain".

According to NZ Musician, the group started out a trio in 2013 which was made up of guitarist Oliver Leupolu, drummer Shaymen Rameka and keyboardist / vocalist Filiva'a James.

According to 2023 interview with Far Out, the influences are Bach and Chopin for Fili James and Oliver Leupolu. The band also listens to French metal band Gojira and in the early days they were listening to Avenged Sevenfold, Lamb of God, and Slipknot.

== Career ==
=== 2010s ===
In 2018, Shepherds Reign released a self-titled album of eight songs. It contained the lead single "Concrete Walls".

On 27 December 2019, their single "Le Manu" was released. According to the review by The Big Idea, the track was possibly the first heavy metal song sung in Samoan language. It was also said to capture the bands raw energy. According to Heavy Magazine, the song notched up over 2 million YouTube views.

=== 2020s ===
In 2023, the group played at the annual Teuila Festival in Samoa. Afterwards, they were invited to play at the Manumea Hotel. The event had a positive response and according to the group, people were open and curious.

On 12 July 2024, the group played the midnight slot at the Riddu Riđđu festival in Norway.

In 2024, their second album Ala Mai was released on Golden Robot Records. It features songs in both English and Samoan. It won awards in the SunPix Best Pacific Language category and the Best Pacific Music Album category.

According to the 22 November 2024 publication of Metal Roos, Shepherds Reign are to be special guests on the 2025 Alien Weaponry tour beginning in March.

== Members ==
- Filiva'a James – lead vocals, keyboards
- Oliver Leupolu – guitar
- Joseph Oti-George – bass
- Shaymen Rameka – drums
- Gideon Voon – guitar

== Discography ==
- 2018: Shepherds Reign (self-released)
- 2023: Ala Mai (Golden Robot Records)
