= Ala Mai =

Studio album by Shepherds Reign
- Released: August 2023
- Genres: Alternative metal, groove metal
- Length: 56:40
- Languages: Samoan, English
- Label: Golden Robot Records
- Producer: Oliver Leupolu

Ala Mai is the second studio album by New Zealand heavy metal group Shepherds Reign. It was released on Golden Robot Records in 2023 in both CD and vinyl LP format. The lyrics are sung in both English and Samoan.

== Background ==
Having previously released a self-titled album in 2018 without label backing, Ala Mai was released via Golden Robot Records in August 2023. The meaning of Ala Mai is to wake up.

Shepherds Reign along with Dick Move were in top tier list of finalist for the Taite Music Prize nomination in 2024.

The album won awards in the SunPix Best Pacific Language category and the Best Pacific Music Album category.

== Reception ==
Sean Frasier of Decibel was joined by band member Filiva'a James to give a track-by-track review account of the album. Frasier said that the album was a "muscular blend of catchy choruses, Gojiran heaviness, '90s groove metal, and Sepultura's Roots record."

Erin Eddy's review was published in Heavy Magazine on 25 August. The review was positive, with Eddy saying that the influences of classic metal were extremely apparent and noted that the band had drawn from the classical and pop genres. Rather than give a track-by-track review, Eddy just concentrated on the title track, "Ala Mai", noting the similarity to Sepultura, the acoustic track "Cold Summers Night" which was sung in English, and "Nafanua" which was released as a single on 4 August.

In his 18 September review, Wil Cifer of Ghost Cult also made comparisons with Roots by Sepultura. He also said that the album was a little bit too radio friendly but there was something for everyone. He gave the album a 7 out of 10.

Conor Lochrie of the Rolling Stone magazine gave a positive review of the album which was published on 27 May 2024. He also said that the album was "a promising sign that Polynesian metal is here to stay.

== Track listing (LP) ==
- A1. "Samoa O La'u Fesili"
- A2. "Aiga"
- A3. "Le Manu"
- A4. "Nafanua"
- A5. "Va Masa'a"
- B1. "Ala Mai"
- B2. "The World Bleeds"
- B3. "Cold Summers Night"
- B4. "Finally"
- C1. "Never Forgotten"
- C2. "Atali'i"
- C3. "Samoa Mo Samoa"
- C4. "Mo'omo'oga Sa Molia"
