= Golden Robot Records =

Australian independent record label

- Founder: Mark Alexander-Erber
- Country of origin: Australia

Golden Robot Records is an Australian independent record label that has released, among others, the albums Mother of the Sun by Jefferson Starship, Silver & Black by Leadfinger, Into the Night and Tomorrow Never Comes by The New Strange, Ala Mai by Shepherds Reign, and Vanilla Zeppelin by Vanilla Fudge.

== Background ==
The label was described by Heavy Magazine as "one of the world's fastest growing independent record labels".

It is overseen by Mark Alexander-Erber. According to Alexander-Erber, the name came about when he looked at a small porcelain statue of a gold robot on a speaker and decided that it was the perfect name for the label.

The very first release for the label was The Orbitor by the group Moon.

== History ==
As reported by Metal Talk on 22 September 2020, rock band Vanilla Fudge had signed on to Golden Robot Records and were set with an imminent release of "Immigrant Song" and were to have a new album out the following year.

In 2021, the group Filter, fronted by Richard Patrick, signed a world-wide deal with Golden Robot Records.

Australian band Leadfinger, originally from Wollongong, New South Wales, had their Silver & Black album released on the label in 2022.

In 2023, the label issued the Ala Mai album by Shepherds Reign. It was a heavy metal album in mostly Samoan language. It was a finalist for the Taite Music Prize nomination in 2024, and won awards in the SunPix Best Pacific Language category, and the Best Pacific Music Album category.
