= Waterfront Records =

Australian independent record label

- Founded: 1982
- Founder: Steven Stavrakis, Chris Dunn
- Distributor(s): Festival Records
- Genre: Various
- Country of origin: Australia
- Location: Sydney
- Official website: waterfrontrecords.com

Waterfront Records was an Australian independent record label based in Sydney, that released recordings by Australian bands during the 1980s and 1990s.

== History ==
Waterfront records was started in 1982 by Steven Stavrakis who, at the time, was an employee of another independent label Phantom Records. The first release for Waterfront was the Careless Talk Costs Lives EP by JFK & The Cuban Crisis that was originally submitted to, but rejected by, the Phantom label. Stavrakis heard the recordings and when Phantom passed on it he decided to release it himself. Stavrakis was later joined by Chris Dunn who was instrumental in discovering a number of the acts that appeared on the Waterfront label.

Over the next 15 years Waterfront put out over 170 releases. Acts like Tumbleweed and Ratcat who would later have success on the mainstream charts released their first records on Waterfront. Waterfront also licensed some recordings from the Sub Pop label that saw them handling the Australian releases for artist like Nirvana, Henry Rollins, L7 and Tad.

The label later spawned a retail shop also called Waterfront that occupied various locations in the Sydney CBD with the three directors each managing different aspects of the business: Stavrakis (label/retail), Chris Dunn (label/retail) and Frank Cotterell (retail/bookkeeping). Stocking local and imported records they gravitated towards a more punk rock aesthetic and were integral in the growth of that scene locally. The shop also regularly hosted live in-store performances.

The Waterfront retail store closed down in March 2000.

In February 2003 the Waterfront Records name and logo was appropriated in the creation of an online retail store with backing by MGM Distribution and the assistance of former Waterfront Record director Cotterell. Stavrakis and Dunn were never consulted and have not ever been involved in the current entity that is using the name Waterfront Records. At that time the intention was purely to run an online retail service (not a record label).

The "real" Waterfront Records label releases can be identified by the DAMP catalogue number prefix.

== Artists released on Waterfront ==
- The Eastern Dark
- The Happy Hate Me Nots
- The Hard Ons
- The Hellmenn
- John Kennedy's Love Gone Wrong
- The Lonely Hearts
- Massappeal
- Mr Floppy
- Nunbait
- The Proton Energy Pills
- Ratcat
- Shindiggers
- Splatterheads
- The Spunk Bubbles
- The Stupids
- The Trilobites
- The Tripps
- Tumbleweed
- Ups and Downs
- Thrust
- Nirvana
- Vicious Circle

== See also ==
- List of record labels
