= Thumlock =

Australian stoner rock band

- Origin: Wollongong, New South Wales, Australia
- Genres: Heavy metal, stoner rock, space rock, psychedelic rock
- Years active: 1994–2002
- Label: High Beam Music
- Past members: Ben Lough; Greg Eshman; Wayne Stokes; Raff Iacurto

Thumlock were an Australian stoner rock band from Wollongong, New South Wales. The band's name was derived from combining the words thumbscrews and hemlock. They formed in 1994 as a three piece by Ben Lough (guitar/vocals), Greg Eshman (drums) and Wayne Stokes (bass). The band released Dripping Silver Heat and then expanded with the addition of Raff Iacurto (guitar). The band signed with High Beam Music and released an EP, Lunar Mountain Sunrise, and two full-length albums, Emerald Liquid Odyssey and Sojourns Lucid Magic, and broke up in 2002

Emerald Liquid Odyssey reached #4 on the Australian Independent Record chart and was distributed by Beard of Stars in Europe. Their next album Sojourns Lucid Magic was distributed in Europe by Cargo Records.

Thumlock have been likened to ""Masters of Reality" or "Paranoid" period Black Sabbath""

After Thumlock Lough, Iacurto, Stokes and Kane Goodwin formed another band called Remnants Of A Dead Star (R.O.A.D.S.) which released one ep Double White Lines. Stokes was a member of The Wardens and Leadfinger.

== Discography ==
EPs

- Dripping Silver Heat (1997)
- Lunar Mountain Sunrise (1999) - High Beam Music

Albums

- Emerald Liquid Odyssey (2000) - High Beam Music
- Sojourns Lucid Magic (2002) - High Beam Music

Singles

- "Moon Dragon" (2001) - High Beam Music
- "Rockin' Course" (2001) - High Beam Music
- "Modulator" (2002) - High Beam Music
