= Shindiggers =

Australian 1980s beat music band

- Also known as: The E-Aitches
- Origin: Melbourne, Australia
- Genres: Beat pop
- Years active: 1983–1987
- Labels: Waterfront, Corduroy
- Past members: Steve Agar; Pete Andrews; Bill Leggett; Spud Wildman (a.k.a. Steve Andrews); Rodney McMurrich

Shindiggers were an Australian beat pop quartet formed in 1983 by Steve Agar on bass guitar, Pete Andrews on lead guitar, Bill Leggett on vocals and Spud Wildman (a.k.a. Steve Andrews) on drums. They released a studio album, Crash Your Party (1986), before disbanding in 1987. Agar, Andrews and Leggett reformed the band in 1997, with Rodney McMurrich on drums to issue another album, Surf Sex Shindiggers (1998), but disbanded thereafter. A double-album compilation, Maximum Beat, was released in 2008.

== History ==
Shindiggers were formed as a beat pop group in Melbourne in 1983 by Steve Agar on bass guitar, Pete Andrews on lead guitar (ex-Twangin' Heartthrobs, Corpse Grinders), Bill Leggett on vocals and Spud Wildman (a.k.a. Steve Andrews) on drums (ex-Dancehall Racketeers). They initially performed cover versions of 1950s and 1960s material, "Hippy Hippy Shake", "I'm Talking About You", "Treat Her Right" and "Til the Following Night". The latter song is by 1960s beat music and shock rock artist, Screaming Lord Sutch, whom Andrews and Leggett acknowledged as a stylistic influence, "he was the first guy to wear shoulder-length hair in 1962 and dress like a vampire or something. He can't sing for nuts but he had a great band."

Baby Let Go, their first four-track extended play was issued in March 1985, which was produced by Graeme Thomas for his independent label, Preston. Australian musicologist Ian McFarlane observed, "[it] captured the band's raw and primitive sound in all its unembellished glory." A six-track mini-album, Beat Is Back (June), which was produced by Lobby Loyde for Man Made. It has three cover versions, Roy Head's "Treat Her Right", the Missing Links' "All I Wasn't" and the Beatles' rendition of "Shimmy Shimmy", as well as three originals written by Leggett. The quartet followed with another four-track EP, Go Wild, in the same year.

For Shindiggers' debut studio album, Crash Your Party, they were signed by Waterfront, which issued it in October 1986. Steve Spinalli of Maximum Rock n Roll noticed the album provides, "catchy songs, all done in a variant of the Mersey style with a slight rockabilly edge... a lot of bouncy poppish fun". The group disbanded in February 1987 with Agar and Legget forming another group, the Joysticks; Pete Andrews joined various bands including Moment of Truth. In 1997 Shindiggers reformed with Agar, Pete Andrews and Leggett joined on drums by Rodney McMurrich. They released another album, Surf Sex Shindiggers (1998), but disbanded again. A double-album, Maximum Beat, was issued via Off the Hip in April 2008.

== Members ==
- Steve Agar – bass guitar
- Pete Andrews – lead guitar
- Bill Leggett – vocals
- Spud Wildman (a.k.a. Steve Andrews) – drums
- Rodney McMurrich – drums

== Discography ==
=== Studio albums ===
- Crash Your Party (October 1986) – Waterfront (DAMP 32)
- Surf Sex Shindiggers (1998) – Corduroy (CORD-047)

=== Compilation albums ===
- Maximum Beat (2×CD, 8 April 2008) – Off The Hip (OTH 7056)

=== Extended plays ===
- Baby Let Go (March 1985) – Preston (13673)
- Beat Is Back (June 1985) – Man Made (MM 009)
- Go Wild (1985) – Man Made (SHIN 02)
