= Massive Appendage =

Australian metal band

- Origin: Sydney, Australia
- Genres: Heavy metal
- Years active: 1986–1990
- Labels: Original
- Spinoffs: Festers Fanatics; Starworld; Killing Time
- Spinoff of: Kings Cross
- Past members: Darren McCormack (p.k.a. Jed Starr); Matt McCormack (p.k.a. Big Bird); Shawn McCormack (p.k.a. Snuff Beastley); Steve Brown (p.k.a. Venom Brown); Simon Cooper (p.k.a. Oxx)

Massive Appendage were an Australian heavy metal band formed in 1986. The core members are three brothers Darren (p.k.a. Jed Starr) on guitar and vocals, Matt (p.k.a. Big Bird) on guitar and vocals and Shawn McCormack (p.k.a. Snuff Beastley) on bass guitar. Darren and one or both brothers were also members of hard rockers Kings Cross, punk rockers Festers Fanatics and funk rockers Starworld. Massive Appendage released a sole studio album, The Severed Erection, and disbanded in 1990. Kings Cross issued an album, Psychedelic World, in 1988. Festers Fanatics released two albums, What Choice Do We Have? (1988) and Fester Fanatics' Greatest Cocktail Party Hits (1989).

== 1986–1990: Massive Appendage ==
Massive Appendage, a heavy metal band, were formed in Sydney in 1986 by Darren McCormack (p.k.a. Jed Starr) on guitar and vocals, his brothers Matt McCormack (p.k.a. Big Bird) on guitar and vocals and Shawn McCormack (p.k.a. Snuff Beastley) on bass guitar as well as Steve Brown (p.k.a. Venom Brown) on drums. Simon Cooper (p.k.a. Oxx) replaced Brown in 1989 and they released a self-financed album The Severed Erection later that year. Its cover art, painted by Kriss Hades of Sadistik Exekution, caused controversy due to its "vivid depiction of sexual ecstasy and drug paraphernalia". Australian musicologist Ian McFarlane described their sound, "characterised by heavy riffs set in counterpoint to vocal harmonies and melodic guitar lines." The group disbanded in 1990.

== Related bands ==
=== 1980s: Kings Cross ===
Kings Cross were a hard rock band formed in the early 1980s in Los Angeles by Darren, Matt and Shawn McCormack. This version released a self-titled extended play in 1984 and ended when the McCormack family returned to Australia. Kings Cross reformed in Sydney with Darren and Shawn joined by Alex Nikolzew (p.k.a. Tubby Wadsworth) on drums and vocals and Marc "Cat Weazle" Welsh on guitar. They released an album, Psychedelic World, in 1989.

=== 1987–1990: Festers Fanatics ===
Festers Fanatics, a punk rock band, were formed in Sydney in 1987 by Darren, Shawn and Nikolzew with Aldo Rubinic (p.k.a. Fester) on vocals. Rubinic was also a chef. Welsh joined on guitar; Cooper and Squire Anderson on bass guitar replaced Nikolzew and Shawn, respectively. An EP, Great Aussie Demo, was released in 1988. The band released two albums What Choice Do We Have? (1988) and Fester Fanatics' Greatest Cocktail Party Hits (1989) and broke up in March 1990.

=== 1992–1993: Starworld ===
Starworld were formed as a funk rock band in Melbourne in 1992 by Darren, Matt, Brown and Anthony Ragg on bass guitar, (ex-Kings of the Sun). in 1993 Welsh took over from Ragg. They released a five-track EP, Starworld '93 (1993). In 1993 Brown and Ragg both joined Nick Barker's new band, Barker.

== Other bands ==
Nikolzew joined hard rock group Killing Time on drums in Melbourne in 1989 and Darren followed on lead guitar in June 1990. The new line-up recorded two EPs, Ruby's Mind and Mandelbroth Set before Nikolzew left in 1991. The band released a single, "Dream Alone", before Darren left in early 1992. Killing Time changed their name to Mantissa in June 1992 and released two albums before disbanding in 1996.

Darren was a member of Jon Stevens's backing band, co-writing and appearing on the latter's 1993 album, Are U Satisfied along with Nick Barker. Darren had co-produced Monstereo Delicio (1992) with Paul Kosky for all-female band, Girl Monstar.

== Discography ==
Kings Cross

- Kings Cross (EP, 1984)
- Psychedelic World (1989) – Original

Massive Appendage

- The Severed Erection (1989) – Original

Fester Fanatics

- What Choice Do We Have? (1988) – Original
- Great Aussie Demo (EP, 1988) – Original
- Fester Fanatics' Greatest Cocktail Party Hits (1989) – Original

Starworld

- Starworld '93 (EP, 1993)
