= Mantissa (band) =

Australian musical group

- Also known as: Killing Time (1989–1992)
- Origin: Melbourne, Victoria, Australia
- Genres: Hard rock, funk metal, alternative rock
- Years active: 1989–1996
- Labels: Red Eye, Polydor
- Past members: Nina Grant; Chris Paine; Adam Pringle; Arnie Prazz; Russell Hopkinson; Tubby Wadsworth; Jed Starr; Syd Green; Chris Collins

Mantissa were an Australian hard rock band which formed as Killing Time in 1989. Killing Time included Nina Grant on bass guitar and vocals, Chris Paine on guitar, and Adam Pringle on lead vocals. In February 1991 they issued an extended play, Ruby's Mind, which reached the Top 100 on the ARIA Singles Chart. Their Dream Alone (March 1992) extended play, peaked in the Top 30. Killing Time supported national tours by Jane's Addiction, Mudhoney, Scatterbrain and Baby Animals. In August 1992 Killing Time changed their name to Mantissa and followed with their debut album, Mossy God, in October on Red Eye Records / Polydor Records, which appeared in the Top 50 ARIA Albums Chart. Their second album, Thirst, appeared in August 1995 and the group disbanded in 1996.

== History ==
Mantissa had formed in 1989 as Killing Time in Melbourne with Nina Grant (ex-Good and Evil) on bass guitar and vocals; Chris Paine (Utter Stench) on guitar; Adam Pringle (Compressed Heads) on lead vocals; and Arnie Prazz on drums. By year's end Prazz was successively replaced by Russell Hopkinson and Tubby Wadsworth (aka Alex Nikolzew). Initially the group performed "Stooges-style grunge". In June 1990 Jed Starr (aka Darren McCormack) joined on lead guitar and the band used a "more adventurous contemporary hard rock stance". The group gained a "fanatical live following" and after a bidding war were signed to Red Eye Records. Their first extended play, Ruby's Mind, appeared in February 1991 and reached No. 72 on the ARIA Singles Chart in August 1991. According to Australian rock music historian, Ian McFarlane, "[w]ith its crunching guitar riffs and funkified bass lines, the anthemic 'Ruby's Mind' launched Killing Time as a band with enormous potential and crossover appeal". At the end of 1991 Wadsworth was sacked and eventually replaced by Syd Green (ex-Scoundrel). One of the intervening drummers, Hopkinson, was later a member of You Am I. In February 1992 another EP, Dream Alone, was released which peaked at No. 23 on the ARIA Singles Chart. Soon after Starr left and was replaced by Chris Collins (ex-Greg Brady Overdrive). Killing Time supported national tours by Jane's Addiction, Mudhoney, Scatterbrain and Baby Animals.

In August 1992 Killing Time changed their name to Mantissa due to an American band and a Japanese band both already having that name. The new name was chosen from the 1982 John Fowles novel, Mantissa. In October 1992 they issued their debut album, Mossy God, (produced by Mantissa and Terry Date), on Red Eye Records / Polydor Records, which reached No. 47. McFarlane noted "The album mixed grinding, heavy riffs, Grant's rumbling bass lines and Pringle's dramatic vocals with a mystical feel and all manner of psychedelic touches". The two singles from the album, "Mary Mary" (November) and "Land of the Living" (March 1993), peaked at No. 55 and No. 60 respectively. Mantissa supported Red Hot Chili Peppers' national tour followed by their own national tours to promote their releases. In 1993 Mantissa spent nine months touring the US to promote the American release of Mossy God, including a support for Mindfunk. Mantissa returned to Australia by 1994 and opened for Pantera in November, they played at the January 1995 Big Day Out festival then released another EP, Inter Alia, that month. In August that year they released their second album, Thirst (produced by Mantissa and Michael Letho), which did not chart. After one last national tour Mantissa broke up in 1996.

On 16 November 2015, founding member and rhythm guitarist Chris Paine died in Melbourne. The news was broken to fans on the band's Facebook page.

== Discography ==
=== Studio albums ===
List of albums, with selected details and chart positions
Title	Album details	Peak chart positions
Title	Album details	AUS
Mossy God	Released: October 1992; Format: CD, cassette; Label: Polydor (517233 2)	47
Thirst	Released: June 1995; Format: CD, cassette; Label: Polydor (527671 2)	157

=== EPs ===
Title	Details	Peak chart positions
Title	Details	AUS
Ruby's Mind (as Killing Time)	Released: 1991; Format: CD, cassette, LP; Label: Red Eye, Polydor (867059-2)	72
Mystery Line/Dream Alone (as Killing Time)	Released: 1992; Format: CD, cassette, LP; Label: Red Eye, Polydor (865483-2)	23
The Mandlebroth Set (as Killing Time)	Released: 1992; Format: CD, LP; Label: Red Eye, Polydor (867840 2)	—

=== Singles ===
List of singles, with selected chart positions
Title	Year	Peak chart positions
Title	Year	AUS
"Mary Mary"	1992	55
"Land of the Living"	1993	60
"Sanctify"	1994	144
"Inter Alia"	1995	133
