= Hard-Ons =

Australian punk rock band

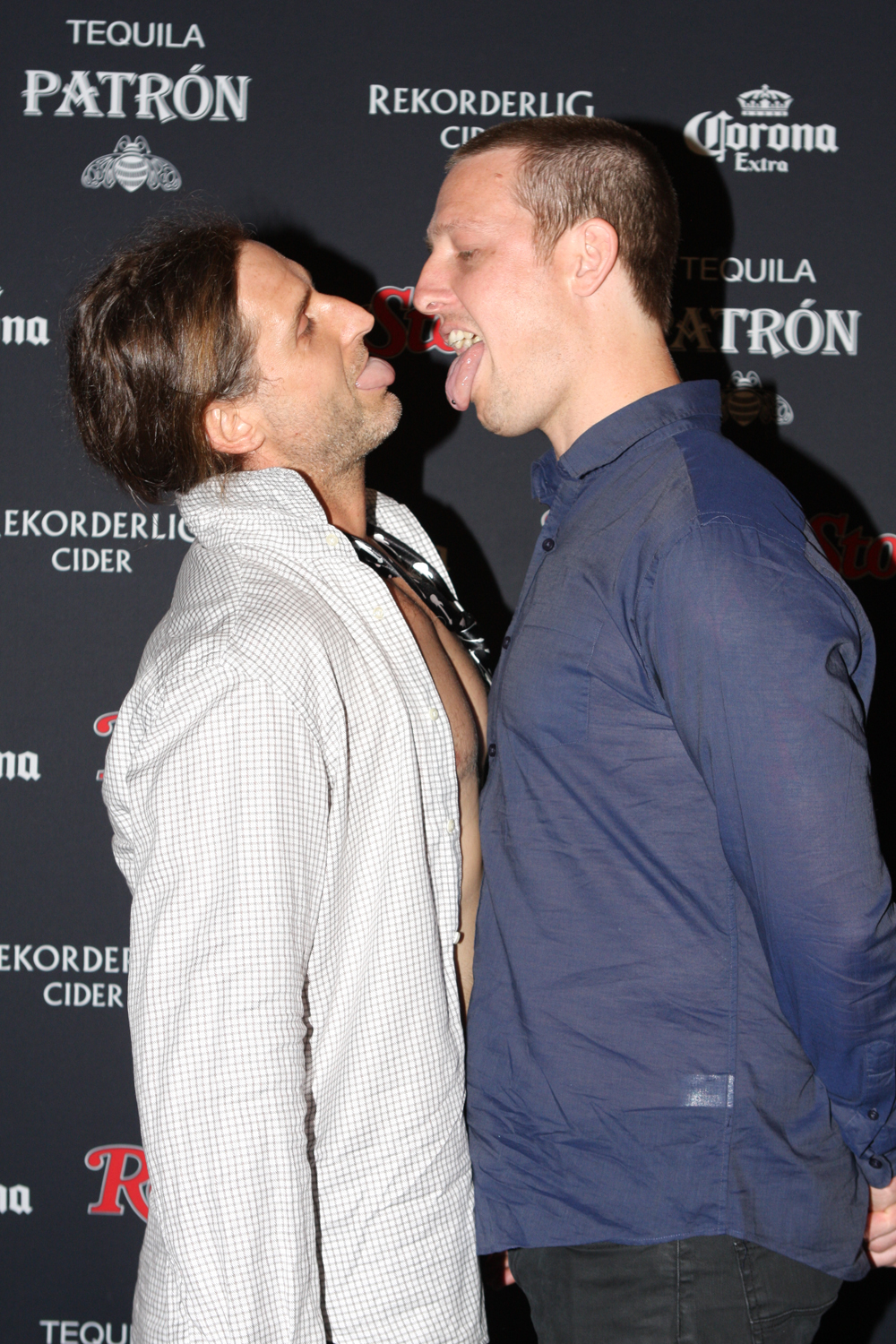
- Peter Black and Murray Ruse at the Rolling Stone Awards

Background information
- Also known as: Dead Rats, Plebs, The Three Sinners
- Origin: Punchbowl, New South Wales, Australia
- Genres: Punk rock, power pop, hardcore punk
- Years active: 1982–1994, 1997–present
- Labels: ViNil, Chatterbox, Bad Taste, Waterfront, Alternative Tentacles, Cheersquad Records and Tapes
- Spinoffs: Nunchukka Superfly
- Members: Peter "Blackie" Black; Ray Ahn; Murray Ruse; Tim Rogers
- Past members: Peter Kostic; Keish de Silva

The Hard-Ons are an Australian punk rock band that formed in 1982 in Punchbowl, New South Wales. Its founding members are Keish de Silva on lead vocals and drums, Peter "Blackie" Black on guitar and backing vocals, and Ray Ahn on bass guitar. The band issued five studio albums before disbanding in 1994. The band reformed in 1997, but in 2002 de Silva announced his departure from the band. He was replaced on drums by Front End Loader's Peter Kostic, while Black took over on lead vocals. Kostic was later replaced by Conation drummer Murray Ruse in 2011. De Silva returned as a guest vocalist in 2014 and permanently rejoined the band in 2016. This version of the band stayed together for an additional five years and one studio album, prior to de Silva's second departure in 2021. You Am I frontman Tim Rogers has since taken over as the band's lead vocalist.

Although the band has had limited mainstream success, they have nevertheless had two singles, two EPs, three studio albums, and one greatest-hits compilation chart on Australia's ARIA Charts. They have also sold more than a quarter-million albums as of 2023.

== Biography ==
=== 1981–1994: Early days to disbandment ===
The Hard-Ons' origins are traced to Western Sydney's Punchbowl Boys High School, where three founding members were students. In 1981 the first version of the band, then-known as Dead Rats, included Peter "Blackie" Black on guitar, Brendan Creighton on drums and Shane Keish de Silva on guitar and vocals. In 1982 Creighton left to form Thrust, and Raymond Dongwan Ahn joined on bass guitar with de Silva taking over on drums. The group began playing as The Plebs before being renamed as The Hard-Ons by the end of that year. Initially too young to play in pubs, the band performed at birthday parties and school dances. On 20 June 1984, The Hard-Ons played their first official show at the Vulcan Hotel in Ultimo. Black later recalled: "We wanted to be punk rockers ... We didn't want Keish's parents to see, so we had bags full of these jackets and chains and stuff and went around the corner of the street and put all these clothes on. Keish's dad busted us". Quickly gaining a considerable following, in August 1985 the band released its debut extended play Surfin' on My Face on ViNil Records. This was the beginning of a series of releases for the band that netted them a run of 17 consecutive No. 1 listings on the Australian alternative music charts.

The band demonstrated an independent punk spirit, with the members deliberately controlling their own careers: recording, booking, and promoting themselves, creating their own artwork (mostly by Ahn), choosing support bands, and even managing the merchandise stand while on tour. During 1987 the group was promoted as part of the Australian skate boarding scene. While maintaining a solid if underground following in Australia, The Hard-Ons were popular in Europe, scoring a Top 10 hit in Spain and a Top 5 slot in Greece with their 1989 album, Love is a Battlefield of Wounded Hearts. That album also reached the Top 5 on the NME chart; this made The Hard-Ons the third Australian band after Nick Cave and the Bad Seeds and the Go Betweens to do so. In 1989 the group recorded a split EP with British band The Stupids. Two years later they teamed with Henry Rollins and released a cover version of AC/DC's hit "Let There Be Rock", which was released in a limited edition on 10-inch vinyl. In January 1992 the group performed at the inaugural Big Day Out and were joined by Rollins on four songs. Following the release of 1993's album Too Far Gone and after recording a live album for Your Choice Records, the band announced their break up to pursue projects outside The Hard-Ons' style of music: "After more than 10 years of playing the same songs, they were just not interested in doing so any more".

After the break-up, Ahn and Black formed another punk band, Nunchukka Superfly, with Pete Allen of Massappeal on drums and, a short time later, James McCann from Harpoon on vocals. Meanwhile, de Silva created Malibu Stacey. Nunchukka Superfly released their debut self-titled album in 1999. Black compared Nunchukka Superfly with The Hard-Ons as "a much heavier and experimental outfit, citing psychedelic, avant-garde, progressive rock, free jazz, funk, and dub among the usual inspirations of punk and post-punk".

=== 1997–2020: Reformation ===
In October 1997, The Hard-Ons played a reunion gig which was followed by the release of a new EP, Yesterday and Today, in 1998 and a compilation album, The Best Of, in 1999. In August 2001, ABC TV broadcast the rock music series, Long Way to the Top. The Hard-Ons featured on "Episode 6: Gathering of the Tribes 1984–2000" where they were described as "an eclectic band of misfits that took up where punk had left off in the early 80s. Their challenge was to make that sound relevant and exciting in the 1990s. There was nothing left but to get downright offensive". In 2001 they played simultaneously with the Austrian noise musicians Farmers Manual as part of the What is Music? festival at the Newtown RSL.

Following This Terrible Place... in 2000, the band's first line-up change in twenty years occurred, with de Silva deciding to leave the band during 2001. Black took up full-time vocals and Pete Kostic (Front End Loader, Regurgitator) was brought in on drums. In 2002 The Hard-Ons and Boom Boom Kid issued a shared EP, Split!. In 2003 The Hard-Ons released Very Exciting!, their first album for Chatterbox Records.

In 2005, the 21st anniversary of the band's first pub gig was celebrated by Australian and European tours as a four-piece, with Kostic drumming and de Silva on vocals. Although technically a three-piece band, de Silva maintained a close relationship with his old band. Recordings were made in 2006 with contributions from all four – though primarily Black, Ahn and Kostic – with the intention of releasing a double album. This project was eventually released as two separate albums: the 'poppier' Most People Are a Waste of Time (2006) and the 'heavier' Most People Are Nicer Than Us (2007), with subsequent tours around Australia. The band recorded with United States comedian Neil Hamburger on guest lead vocals in January 2008. In April 2011, the group announced via their website that Kostic had left. On 5 August that year Murray Ruse (Conation, Captain Cleanoff) played his first show as their new drummer.

In 2012, the band began re-issuing their early catalogue as bonus re-packagings featuring unreleased songs and live tracks. The first to be released was a new 60-track version of Smell My Finger and The Hard-Ons promoted it with a national tour. While working a shift as a taxi driver between legs of that tour on 18 May 2012, Black suffered a severely fractured skull when he was assaulted with a skateboard. Several fund-raising shows were held to raise money for his care and recovery, including special Hard-Ons shows in Sydney and Newcastle on 1 and 2 June that featured the line-up of Ahn, Kostic and de Silva on vocals and guitar. Within three months, Black had recovered sufficiently to perform a short tour in support of his solo album No Dangerous Gods in Tunnel that was followed by a Hard-Ons tour of Europe and Japan. Another Australian tour to wrap up the previously cancelled shows was completed in October, with a 51-track re-release of Dickcheese coming out around the same time.

=== 2021–present: de Silva's second departure and new music ===
Keish de Silva was removed from the Hard-Ons in March 2021 following allegations of sexual misconduct. A planned documentary on the band was also cancelled.

In August 2021, it was announced that Tim Rogers was the group's new lead singer. The band's thirteenth studio album was released on 8 October 2021, titled I'm Sorry Sir, That Riff's Been Taken. The album debuted at No. 4 on the ARIA charts, becoming the band's first to enter the ARIA Top 50.

In April 2023, the band announced a new album titled Ripper '23 and an accompanying Australian tour. The album peaked at No. 28 on the national chart. During 2024, the Hard-Ons toured Australia with The Damned and played on four dates of Radio Birdman's 50th anniversary tour.

I Like You a Lot Getting Older, the Hard-Ons' 15th studio album, was released on 4 October 2024. By 16 October 2024, it had reached No. 5 on the ARIA Australian music charts. Their 40th anniversary Australian tour began on 8 October 2024.

== In film ==
A feature-length documentary film about the band's career titled The Most Australian Band Ever, directed by Jonathan Sequeira, premiered at SXSW Sydney on 18 October 2024.

== Musical style ==
Early recordings by The Hard-Ons such as Smell My Finger, Dickcheese, Love Is a Battlefield of Wounded Hearts, and Yummy! set the blueprint for the group's sound: messy pop-punk with metal and psychedelia elements. Australian music historian Ian McFarlane describes their music as "cheap and potent, their appeal selective. Yet never has so much been owed by so many to so few chords ... fused punk tempos, hardcore attitude, heavy metal riffs and surf-pop melodies into a seamless ball of energy". A 1987 Beat Magazine article described their sound as "Motörhead meets the Beach Boys"; AllMusic's Jody McGregor describes it as a "mix of punk, pop, and metal" with "dashes of power pop, psychedelic rock, thrashy metal, and a healthy dose of humor". Though originally inspired by punk bands such as Sex Pistols, The Buzzcocks, The Damned, Ramones and The Saints, the band also blended pop, psychedelia, and metal elements; Ahn described it as "death-pop". The band had a very similar sound to Hüsker Dü, especially during their Candy Apple Grey era. They were also noteworthy not only within punk but also within rock music for lead vocals by de Silva, the group's drummer. The physical challenge of drumming to the band's fast punk rock songs as well as singing (as opposed to shouting) made for charismatic live performances. Guitarist Black provided another original touch to the band with his distinctive guitar sound that is both melodic and messy, often making use of feedback.

Major recurring lyrical themes range from girls, love, and relationships (as in: "I Do I Do I Do", "Just Being With You", "Girl in the Sweater") to toilet humour ("I Farted", "Oozin' for Pleasure") as well as other variations, particularly in the post-Keish line-up of the band.

== Band members ==
=== Current members ===
- Ray Ahn – bass guitar, backing vocals (1982–1993, 1998–present)
- Peter "Blackie" Black – guitar (1982–1993, 1998–present), backing vocals (1982–1993, 1998–2001, 2016–present), lead vocals (2001–2016, occasional live shows 2025–present)
- Murray Ruse – drums (2011–present)
- Tim Rogers – lead vocals (2021–present)

=== Former members ===
- Pete Kostic – drums (2002–2011, 2025 US tour; substitute for Murray Ruse)
- Keish de Silva – drums (1982–1993, 1998–2001), lead vocals (1982–1993, 1998–2001, 2016–2021)
- Jerry A – lead vocals (2025 US tour; substitute for Tim Rogers)

== Discography ==
=== Studio albums ===
List of studio albums
Title	Album details	Peak chart positions
Title	Album details	AUS
Smell My Finger	Released: November 1986; Label: Waterfront (DAMP 37); Formats: LP	—
Dickcheese	Released: April 1988; Label: Waterfront (DAMP 71); Formats: LP, cassette	—
Love Is a Battlefield of Wounded Hearts	Released: June 1989; Label: Waterfront (DAMP102, SOL19 CD); Formats: LP, cassette, CD	—
Yummy!	Released: December 1990; Label: Waterfront, Festival (DAMP147, C 30500, SOL26 CD); Formats: LP, cassette, CD	93
Too Far Gone	Released: June 1993; Label: Waterfront, Festival (C 30989, DAMP 181); Formats: LP, Cassette, CD	107
This Terrible Place...	Released: 20 November 2000; Label: Chatterbox (CB014); Formats: LP, CD	—
Very Exciting!	Released: 17 March 2003; Label: Chatterbox (CB028); Formats: CD, LP	—
Most People Are a Waste of Time	Released: 10 April 2006; Label: Chatterbox (CB047); Formats: CD, LP	—
Most People Are Nicer Than Us	Released: 4 August 2007; Label: Chatterbox (CB059); Formats: CD, LP	—
Alfalfa Males Once Summer Is Done Conform or Die	Released: 11 May 2010; Label: The Cool Bananas Record Company (COOL1); Formats: LP, CD	—
Peel Me Like a Egg	Released: 29 September 2014; Label: Citadel; Formats: CD, vinyl, digital download	—
So I Could Have Them Destroyed	Released: 11 October 2019; Label: Music Farmers; Formats: CD, vinyl, streaming	—
I'm Sorry Sir, That Riff's Been Taken	Released: 8 October 2021; Label: Cheersquad; Formats: CD, vinyl, streaming, cassette	4
Ripper '23	Released: 2 June 2023; Label: Cheersquad; Formats: CD, vinyl, streaming, cassette	26
I Like You a Lot Getting Older	Released: 4 October 2024; Label: Cheersquad; Formats: CD, vinyl, streaming, cassette	71
Hard-Ons/Jerry A (with Jerry A)	Released: 14 August 2026; Label: Cheersquad; Formats: CD, vinyl, streaming, cassette	35

=== Soundtrack albums ===
List of soundtrack
Title	Album details	Peak chart positions
Title	Album details	AUS
The Most Australian Band Ever! – The Secret Origin of the Hard-Ons	Released: 5 December 2025; Label: Cheer (9361385181502); Formats: LP, CD, Cassette	54

=== Compilation albums ===
List of compilation albums
Title	Album details	Peak chart positions
Title	Album details	AUS
Hard-Ons	Released: 1986 (US); Label: Big Time Records (6040-1-B); Formats: LP, Cassette; Note: US compilation	—
Hot for Your Love, Baby	Released: December 1987; Label: Waterfront Records (DAMP 63); Formats: LP	—
The Worst of...	Released: 1988 (Europe); Label: Vinyl Solution (SOL-8); Formats: LP; Note: UK & Europe compilation	—
Junk 1984–1987	Released: 1991; Label: Formats: LP	—
Rarities	Released: 1994; Label: Waterfront Records (DAMP182); Formats: CD, Cassette	—
Singles	Released: 1994; Label: Waterfront Records (DAMP183); Formats: CD, Cassette	127
A Decade of Rock	Released: October 1994; Label: Waterfront Records, Festival Records (DAMP 182, DAMP 183); Formats: 2× CD; Note: Combines Singles and Rarities	68
The Best of...	Released: 1999; Label: Citadel Records (CITCD 546); Formats: CD, Cassette	—
Suck and Swallow: 25 Years 25 Songs	Released: 23 March 2009; Label: Boss Tuneage Records (BTRCRS037); Formats: CD	—
Eat Shit Listen to Horrible Music	Released: 2 May 2010; Label: Insubordination Records (116); Formats: CD, LP	—

=== Live albums ===
List of live albums
Title	Album details
Your Choice Live Series	Released: 1995; Label: Your Choice Records (YCLS 026); Formats: CD; Note: German release
Live at the Annandale	Released: 2011; Label: We Empty Rooms (WER 15); Formats: LP; Note: Recorded at the Annandale Hotel, Sydney

=== Extended plays ===
List of extended plays
Title	EP details	Peak chart positions
Title	EP details	AUS
Surfin' on My Face	Released: August 1985; Label: ViNil Records (VR 006); Formats: 7" vinyl	—
No Cheese (The High-Way to Hell Tour Souvenir)	Released: 1988; Label: Waterfront Records (DAMP 88); Formats: 10" vinyl; Note: Split EP with The Stupids, Tennant All Stars and Pittman All Stars	—
Sick of Being Sick	Released: 28 July 1989; Label: Waterfront Records (DAMP111); Formats: 7" vinyl; Note: aka Giveaway EP	—
Where the Wild Things Are...	Released: 1992; Label: Waterfront Records, Festival Records (DAMP 170, D 16022); Formats: 7" vinyl, CD, Cassette; Note: Split EP with Celibate Rifles	51
Dateless Dudes' Club!	Released: May 1992; Label: Waterfront Records, Festival Records (DAMP176, D 29127); Formats: CD, Cassette	78
Test	Released: January 1994; Label: Waterfront Records, Festival Records (DAMP183, D11550); Formats: CD, Cassingle	—
Yesterday and Today	Released: May 1999; Label: One Way Street Records (OWSEP01); Formats: CD	—
Split!	Released: 2002; Label: Formats: Note: Split EP with Boom Boom Kid	—
Pay Attention Collector Scum	Released: 7 November 2008; Label: Stiff Records (BUY 666); Formats: CD	—
American Exports (with Neil Hamburger)	Released: April 2009; Label: Red Lounge Records (RLR 062); Formats: 7" vinyl; Note: Vocals by Neil Hamburger	—
Split	Released: 16 October 2010; Label: Formats: 7" vinyl; Note: Split EP with The Manges	—
Shit-Pants-Shit-Pants	Released: 2011; Label: Boss Tuneage, The Cool Bananas Record Company (BTRC060, COOL3); Formats: CD	—
Redd Kross/Hard-Ons	Released: 27 February 2026; Label: Cheersquad Records; Formats: 12" vinyl, digital; Note: Split EP with Redd Kross	48
Korean language EP	Released: 26 June 2026; Label: Cheersquad Records & Tapes; Formats: 12" vinyl, digital	—

=== Charting singles ===
List of singles which had a chart position within the ARIA top 100
Title	Year	Chart peak positions	Album
Title	Year	AUS	Album
"Let There Be Rock" (with Henry Rollins)	1991	65	Non-album singles
"She's a Dish"	1992	64	Non-album singles

=== DVDs ===
Title	Date
The Hard-Ons vs. Europe 2007	2008

=== Reissues ===
Volume	Title	Description	Date
1 (1984–1987)	Smell My Finger	60 track double C.D. featuring every release from the period, demos, live tracks and rarities	2012
2 (1987–1988)	Dickcheese	51 track double C.D. featuring every release from the period, demos, live tracks and rarities	2013

== Awards and nominations ==
=== AIR Awards ===
The Australian Independent Record Awards (commonly known informally as AIR Awards) is an annual awards night to recognise, promote and celebrate the success of Australia's Independent Music sector.

Year	Nominee / work	Award	Result	Ref.
2022	I'm Sorry Sir, That Riff's Been Taken	Best Independent Rock Album or EP	Nominated	
2023	Yummy (re-release)	Best Independent Punk Album or EP	Nominated	

=== Don Banks Music Award ===
Foundation band members, Raymond Ahn and Peter "Blackie" Black, were honoured jointly with the 2025 Don Banks Music Award.
