= Tumbleweed (band) =

Australian rock band

- Origin: Wollongong, New South Wales, Australia
- Genres: Psychedelic rock; grunge; stoner rock; garage rock
- Years active: 1990–2001, 2009–present
- Labels: Waterfront, Polydor
- Members: Lenny Curley; Richie Lewis; Paul Hausmeister; Steve O'Brien; Jamie Cleaves
- Past members: Dave Curley; Jay Curley; Al Lynch; Phil Lally; Matt Houston; Alex Compton; Dave Achille; Nik Reith; Simon Cox

Tumbleweed are an Australian rock group formed in 1990 in Tarrawanna. Three of their studio albums appeared on the ARIA top 50: Tumbleweed (1992), Galactaphonic (1995), and Return to Earth (1996).

== History ==
=== 1990–1994: Formation and self-titled debut ===
Tumbleweed were formed in October 1990 in Tarrawanna, a northern suburb of the sea-side city of Wollongong after the demise of The Proton Energy Pills. The three Curley brothers: Dave on lead vocals, Jay on bass guitar, Lenny on guitar and Richie Lewis on drums. Their initial line up only lasted a few months, they recorded a 7" single, "Captain's Log", which was produced by Mudhoney's Mark Arm, in December 1990 and released in August the next year on Waterfront Records. McFarlane noted that it was "a distorted slice of voodoo acid-rock". Australian musicologist, Ian McFarlane, described Tumbleweed as the "ultimate stoner's band for the 1990s. From within a post-psychedelic underground haze that evoked the spirit of 1969, [they] came on with lashings of fuzz-drenched wah wah guitar riffs, hard-driving beats, languid vocal melodies and more hair than any band had a right to possess!"

By the time "Captain's Log" was released, Paul Hausmeister (ex-Unheard) had joined on lead guitar before Dave was replaced on vocals by Richie Lewis, and Steve O'Brien (also ex-Unheard) took over the drums. The new line up issued a second single, "Stoned"/"Holy Moses", in December 1991 and that month they supported United States grunge group, Nirvana on their Australian tour. They soon followed with a three-track extended play, Carousel (aka Theatre of Gnomes), released in April 1992. In August 1992, they released another five-track EP, Weedseed, which was recorded by John Hresc and mixed by Doug Colson.

In November 1992, they released the single "Acid Rain" and ended the year with the release in Australia of their debut studio album, Tumbleweed, which was also produced by Colson. It peaked at No. 48 on the ARIA Albums Chart on 13 December 1992. The group undertook a tour of the US and Europe.

In late January 1993, Tumbleweed appeared at the Sydney venue of the Big Day Out concert. They spent most of the year touring locally, including a joint national tour with fellow Australian group You Am I, in May and June. Tumbleweed then toured internationally. In March, they issued an EP, Sundial, with the which peaked at No. 35 on the ARIA Singles Chart. They followed with another single, "Daddy Long Legs", in January 1994, which peaked at No. 53.

In 1994, they appeared on the national Big Day Out tour. In June they supported Rollins Band on their Australian tour. The band were signed to the Polydor label by Craig Kamber and they recorded their second album, Galactaphonic, with Paul McKercher producing. Tumbleweed released "Gyroscope" in November 1994 ahead of the album.

=== 1995–1998: Galactaphonic and Return to Earth ===
The group's second album, Galactaphonic, was released in June 1995 and peaked at No. 6. McFarlane described it as "epic masterwork, a strident album full of fierce, booming metal-boogie and catchy, hard-edged rock'n'roll. As well as the band's formative influences, Galactophonic also revealed a debt to the likes of Monster Magnet, The Stooges, Sonic Youth and even The Beatles". By then they had toured on the Big Day Out series in January and issued another single, "Hang Around", in April 1995. At the end of the year Hausmeister was replaced on guitar by Dave Achille (ex-Full Tab) and O'Brien by Nik Reith (of The Celibate Rifles) on drums.

In February to March 1996 they toured as a double headline with Monster Magnet on their Australian tour. Tumbleweed's third album, Return to Earth, was released in September 1996, which reached No. 11. The album was also produced by McKercher with early copies featuring a 10-track bonus disc, Ready by Wednesday. The associated singles "Lavabread" and "I Remember" preceded the album. In October to November they promoted their recent releases with a national tour and were supported by Magic Dirt. Also in October Tumbleweed issued another single, "Silver Lizard".

They started 1997 with their fifth appearance at Big Day Out. Their next single "Fang It!" appeared in April 1998 and was followed by a year-long hiatus while members pursued various side projects. Lewis combined with Kram (drummer in Spiderbait) to form Hot Rollers which issued a self-titled album in July. Jason Curley and Reith joined Brother Brick with Stewart Cunningham (ex-Proton Energy Pills) on guitar, and toured Australia.

=== 1999–2001: Mumbo Jumbo and disbandment ===
Tumbleweed reconvened in 1999 and started working with Phil McKellar on a new album. Its first single, "Glow in the Dark!" was released in October 1999 and appeared ahead of the album, Mumbo Jumbo which was released in March 2000. At this time, Jay Curley had been replaced by Phil Lally on bass guitar. Dan Lander of The Planet of Sound felt the album was a "return of the classic, thick, melodic Tumbleweed sound, albeit in a slightly updated form". At the ARIA Music Awards of 2000 the album was nominated for ARIA Award for Best Adult Alternative Album. The group disbanded in 2001.

=== 2009–present: The Waterfront Years 1992–94 and Sounds from the Other Side ===
In July 2009, the early line-up of Jay and Lenny Curley, Hausmeister, Lewis, and O'Brien reformed and appeared at the Homebake festival in December. They played at the Sydney and Melbourne Big Day Out venues in January 2010, and followed in November by issuing a 2×CD compilation album, The Waterfront Years 1992–94, of their early work. I-94's resident reviewer, The Barman, noted the release was "an obvious idea that it's a wonder no-one issued this before" and he felt that the term 'stoner music' was "an inadequate and ordinary label, and [the band] are simply riff-heavy rock and roll, with a rhythm section grounded in something more dynamic and bluesy than straight-up 4/4 or boogie. They swing". They performed at the inaugural CherryFest in Melbourne on 25 November 2012.

In September 2013, the group released a fifth studio album, titled Sounds from the Other Side. Pete Laurie of The Music website found "isn't about reinventing the wheel, but it never sounds like a lazy rehash of the good old days either". Lewis explained to The Age's Martin Boulton "We got to a point after the re-formation where we decided not to put an end date on it [...] we said we can't keep playing that same period [of songs] for the rest of our lives [...] While we love it and we know our fans love it … in order to be a relevant, creative unit [and] for our own personal satisfaction more than anything, we've got to try writing again and doing something new together and that's been really interesting and amazing". The group announced an Australian tour to promote the album during November and December 2013.

On 26 August 2014, the band announced, via their Facebook page, that Jason Curley had died suddenly at his home the previous day from an alcohol-related illness at the age of 42.

In 2020, the band released a double-A sided single with Richie Lewis saying, "'Shadowland' is about the uncertainty of the future, these are strange times, dangerous and divisive times. When the truth is not believed, there is little you can trust or count on".

In December 2021, the band celebrated their 30th anniversary by releasing a limited deluxe singles box and an anniversary tour.

== Members ==
Current members

- Richie Lewis – lead vocals (1990–2001, 2009–present), drums (1990)
- Lenny Curley – guitar, backing vocals (1990–2001, 2009–present)
- Paul Hausmeister – guitar, backing vocals (1990–1995, 2009–present)
- Steve O'Brien – drums (1990–1995, 2009–present)
- Jamie Cleaves – bass (2014–present)

Former members

- Dave Curley – lead vocals (1990)
- Jason Curley – bass (1990–1998, 2009–2014; his death)
- Dave Achille – guitar (1996)
- Nik Reith – drums (1996–1998)
- Alex Lynch – guitar (1996–2001)
- Simon Cox – drums (1998–2001)
- Alex Compton – bass (1998–1999)
- Matt Houston – bass (1999–2000)
- Phil Lally – bass (2000–2001)

== Discography ==
=== Studio albums ===
List of studio albums, with selected details and chart positions
Title	Details	Peak chart positions
Title	Details	AUS
Tumbleweed	Released: December 1992; Label: Waterfront, Festival (D 24013); Formats: CD, cassette	48
Galactaphonic	Released: June 1995; Label: Polydor (527832 2); Formats: CD, cassette	6
Return to Earth	Released: August 1996; Label: Polydor (533058-2); Formats: CD, cassette	11
Mumbo Jumbo	Released: March 2000; Label: Grudge, Polydor (543733-2); Formats: CD	119
Sounds from the Other Side	Released: September 2023; Label: Shock (CTX708CD); Formats: CD, LP	111

=== Compilation albums ===
List of compilation albums, with selected details and chart positions
Title	Details	Peak chart positions
Title	Details	AUS
The Waterfront Years 1991–1993	Released: November 2010; Label: Waterfront Records, Aztec Music (AVSCD055); Formats: 2×CD, digital download	—
30th Anniversary Singles Box Set	Released: 10 December 2021; Label: Farmer & The Owl (FATO035); Formats: Limited 12× 7" singles, digital download, streaming	120
Killer Weed	Released: 24 March 2023; Label: Farmer & The Owl (FATO046); Formats: LP, Cassette (limited), digital download, streaming	157

=== Extended plays ===
List of extended plays, with selected details and chart positions
Title	Details	Peak chart positions
Title	Details	AUS
Theatre of Gnomes	Released: April 1992; Label: Waterfront (DAMP 172); Formats: 12" EP, CD	116
Weedseed	Released: August 1992; Label: Waterfront (DAMP 175); Formats: 2x7" LP, CD	111
Sundial	Released: March 1993; Label: Waterfront (DAMP 179); Formats: CD, cassette	35

=== Singles ===
List of singles, with selected chart positions
Title	Year	Peak chart positions	Album
Title	Year	AUS	Album
"Captains Log"	1991	—	Theatre of Gnomes
"Stoned" / "Holy Moses"	1991	—	Theatre of Gnomes
"Acid Rain" / "Funky"	1992	88	Tumbleweed
"Sundial (Mary Jane)"	1993	—	Tumbleweed
"Daddy Long Legs"	1994	53	Non-album single
"Gyroscope"	1994	50	Galactaphonic
"Hang Around"	1995	48	Galactaphonic
"Armchair Ride"	1995	107	Galactaphonic
"Lavabread"	1996	75	Return to Earth
"I Remember"	1996	81	Return to Earth
"Silver Lizard"	1996	137	Return to Earth
"Fang It!"	1998	125	Non-album single
"Glow in the Dark!"	1999	174	Mumbo Jumbo
"Ghostshakers"	2000	—	Mumbo Jumbo
"Planet of the Weeds"	2000	—	Mumbo Jumbo
"Mountain"	2013	—	Sounds from the Other Side
"Shadowland" / "Rebellion"	2020	—	Non-album single

== Awards and nominations ==
=== ARIA Music Awards ===
The ARIA Music Awards is an annual awards ceremony that recognises excellence, innovation, and achievement across all genres of Australian music. They commenced in 1987.

Year	Nominee / work	Award	Result	Ref.
2000	Mumbo Jumbo	Best Alternative Release	Nominated	
