= Asteroid B-612 =

Australian hard rock band

- Origin: Sydney, New South Wales, Australia
- Genres: Hard rock
- Years active: 1992–2004
- Labels: Destroyer/Shock; Au Go Go; Full Toss; Off the Hip; Golden Robot Records
- Past members: Michael Gibbons; Grant McIver; Scott Nash; Darren Pierce; John Spittles; Stewart Cunningham; Ben Fox; Ken Watts; Graham Spittles

Asteroid B-612 were an Australian hard rock band, which formed in 1992. By the following year the line-up was Michael Gibbons on guitar, Grant McIver on lead vocals, Scott Nash on bass guitar, Darren Pierce on drums and John Spittles on guitar. They released four studio albums, Asteroid B-612 (1993), Forced into a Corner (1994), Not Meant for this World (October 1996) and Readin' Between the Lines (2000), before disbanding in 2004.

== History ==
Asteroid B-612 were formed in 1992 in Sydney. By the following year the line-up of Michael Gibbons on guitar, Grant McIver on lead vocals, Scott Nash on bass guitar, Darren Pierce on drums and John Spittles on guitar, recorded their debut self-titled album. It appeared on Destroyer Records. According to Australian musicologist, Ian McFarlane, they were "playing its brand of hard-edged Detroit-inspired 'sonic rock action'... Without falling prey to the pitfalls of such an established form, the band overlaid its bedrock of raunchy 12 bar blues with textbook riffs and searing, dual lead guitar workouts." They issued a split single, "I've Had You", with a track by fellow Sydney rockers, Brother Brick, on the obverse, via Lance Rock Records.

By late 1994 Stewart Cunningham (ex-the Proton Energy Pills, Brother Brick) had replaced Gibbons on guitar and Ben Fox replaced Pierce on drums to record their second album, Forced into a Corner. It was co-produced by Spittles, Lindsay Gravina and Dave Thomas for Destroyer Records, distributed by Shock Records, at Birdland Studios, Melbourne. The group signed with Melbourne-based label, Au Go Go Records, which issued their five-track extended play, Teen Sublimation Riffs, in 1995. The group toured the United States supporting garage rockers, Gas Huffer – Cunningham left in mid-tour – late in 1996.

The group's "third and best album", Not Meant for this World, appeared in October 1996 and had been recorded with Cunningham before he left. Mike DaRonco of AllMusic observed, "On top of their added approach of angst and speed, [provided their] take on a grittier, straight forward approach of rock 'n' roll in the vein of The Stooges, Blue Öyster Cult and The New York Dolls." The Barman of I-94 Bar website opined, "[its] original incarnation suffered from a lack of balls in the bottom end".

After the album appeared Ken Watts (ex-Valvolux) joined on guitar and they continued touring in early 1997. McIver left during that year and was replaced by John's brother, Grahame Spittles on lead vocals. In November 1997 they released a single, "September Crush", with the members adopting performance names, Ben "Barn Stormer" Fox, Scott "Galveston" Nash, "Deluxe" Grahame Spittles, Johnny "Casino" Spittles and Ken "the Killer" Watts. A six-track EP, Different Licks for Different Chicks, followed in February 1999 on Rambling Records.

They recorded their fourth studio album, Readin' Between the Lines (2000), with Kent Steadman (of Celibate Rifles) producing for Full Toss Records. I-94 Bar's Roberto Calabro felt, "[it's] a great collection of songs. A record that opens the sonic possibilities of this band, going from the unbeatable hi-energy rock 'n' roll trademark to psychedelic numbers, from hard-driven mid-tempo to melodic songs with continuity." The group disbanded in 2004.

In late 2019 Golden Robot Records released all of the back catalogue for the first time on all digital platforms worldwide, this relationship was 20 plus years in the making with Golden Robot Owner Mark Alexander-Erber once owning the famous Iron Duke Hotel in Sydney where Asteroid B-612 would once play.

Golden Robot has now released all of Johnny Casino's albums (Asteroid / Secrets / Easy Action / Solo) on all digital platforms.

Bassist Scott Nash died on 28 December 2022.

== Members ==
- Michael Gibbons – guitar (1992–93)
- Grant McIver – lead vocals (1992–97)
- Scott Nash – bass guitar (1992–2004; died 2022)
- Darren Pierce – drums (1992–93)
- John Spittles – lead guitar (1992–2004)
- Stewart Cunningham – lead guitar (1993–96)
- Ben Fox – drums (1993–2004)
- Ken Watts – guitar (1996–97)
- Graham Spittles – lead vocals (1997–2004)

== Discography ==
=== Studio albums ===
- Asteroid B-612 (1993) – Destroyer
- Forced into a Corner (1994) – Destroyer/Shock Records
- Not Meant for this World (1996) – Au Go Go Records
- Readin' Between the Lines (2000) – Full Toss

=== Live albums ===
- The Greenback Blues (2004) – Off the Hip

=== Compilation albums ===
- All New Hits (1996) – Lance Rock
- Two Fisted Rock'n'Roll (2005) – Off the Hip
- Not Meant for this World – The Au-Go-Go Years 1994–1996 (2008) – Off the Hip

=== Extended plays ===
- Teen Sublimation Riffs (1995) – Au Go Go Records
- Different Licks for Different Chicks (1998) – Rambling Records

=== Singles ===
- "I've Had You" (1994) – Lance Rock
- "Crash Landing" (1995) – Brain Salad Surgery
- "Straight Back to You!" (1996) – Broken
- "September Crush" (1997) – Au Go Go Records
- "So Long, Goodbye" (1999) – Full Toss
- "Outcast" (2000) – Full Toss
- "Always Got Something to Lose" (2004) – Bang!
