= Hopetoun Hotel =

Historic Sydney hotel and music venue

- The Hoey
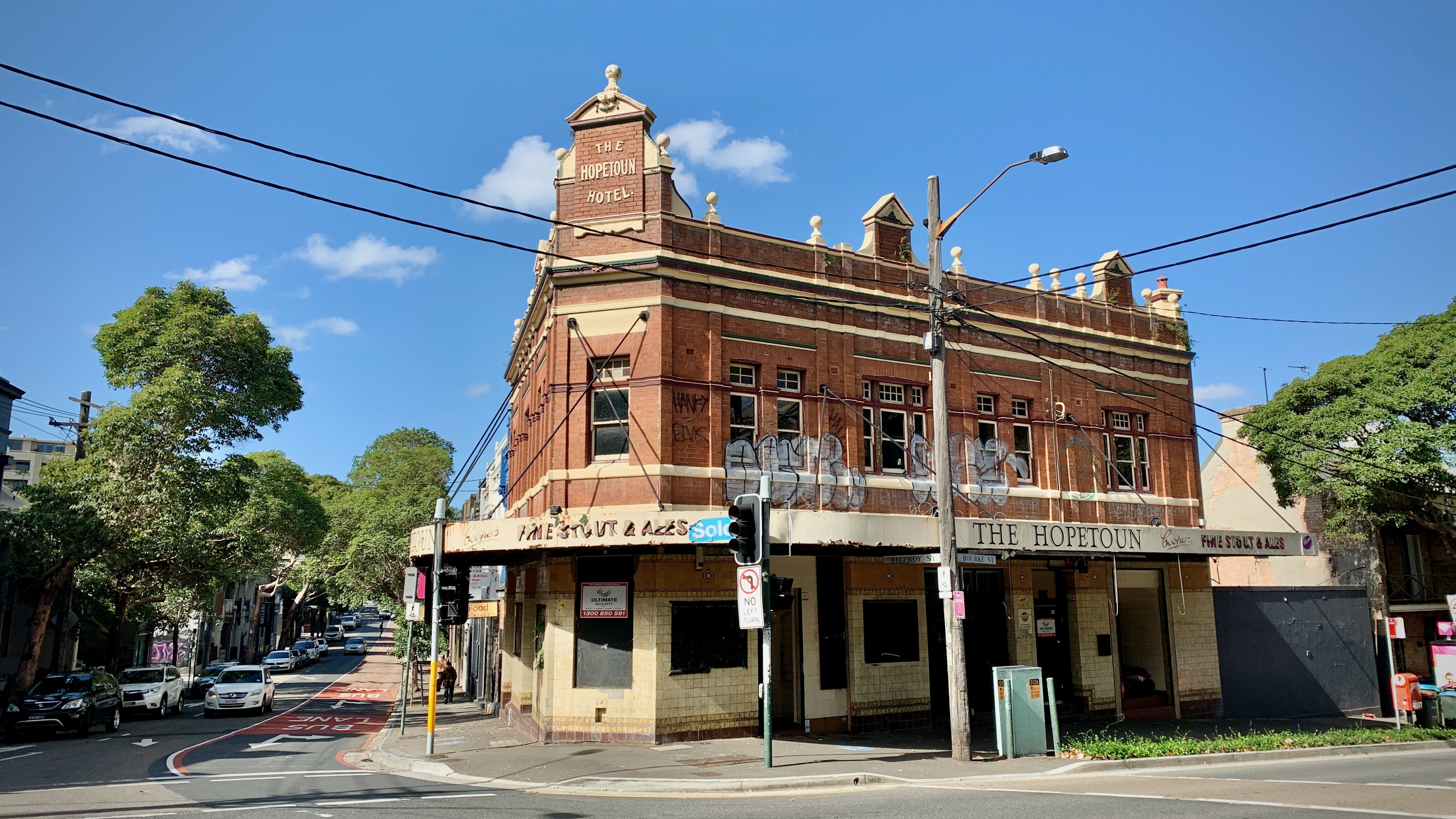
- The disused Hopetoun Hotel in 2020
- Interactive map of Hopetoun Hotel
- Former names: The Cockatoo Inn (1839–1861); The Sportsman’s Arms (1861–1873); Kilkenny Inn (1873–1885); The Great Western Hotel (1885–1901))
- Address: 416 Bourke Street, Surry Hills; Sydney; Australia
- Coordinates: 33.88537°S 151.21587°E
- Owner: Evangelos and Anastasia Patakas
- Type: Music venue
- Designation: Heritage listed

Construction
- Built: 1836~1839
- Closed: 2009

The Hopetoun Hotel, colloquially referred to as The Hoey, is a historic Sydney hotel and live music venue in Surry Hills. It was built somewhere between 1836 and 1839, originally under the name of the Cockatoo Inn and then in 1901 revamped and named in honour of the first Governor General, Lord Hopetoun. In 1997 it was purchased by siblings Evangelos and Anastasia Patakas for $1.5 million and became a live music venue that saw performances by bands including the Hoodoo Gurus and Wolfmother. In 2009, it was closed due to accumulated fines and police citations for noise violations in a residential area. It has remained shut since, though it was used in 2012 as a set for The Wolverine (film).

Regarding venue, Australian indie musician Sarah Blasko stated, "It's so intimate, you almost feel like you could order a drink from the stage".

== History ==
The hotel is a heritage listed building and has occupied the site for over 150 years forming a landmark feature in Surry Hills. It is an important architectural example of an early Federation warehouse style face brick building.

=== Renaming ===
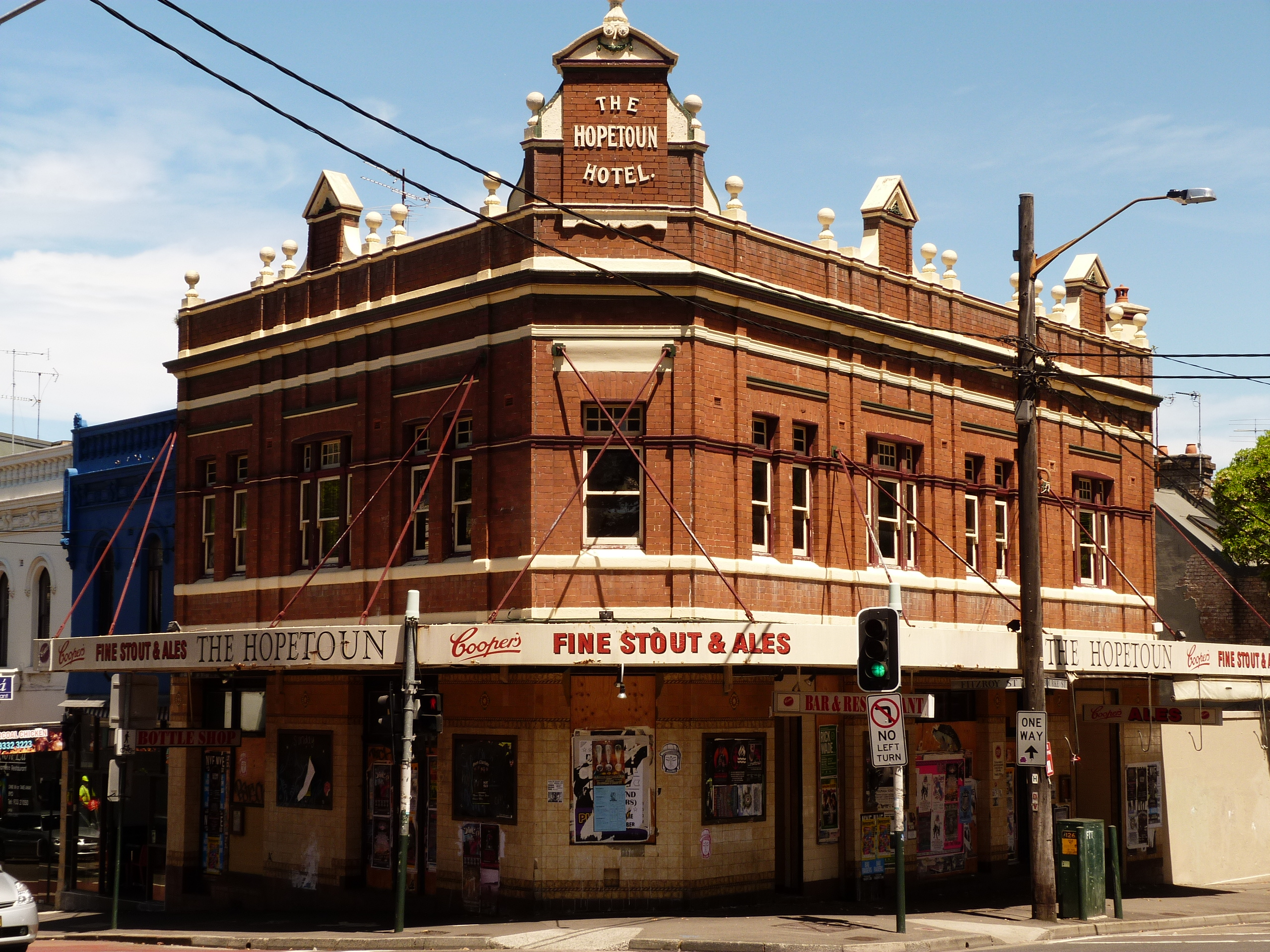
The hotel in 2010

The hotel has been renamed many times:

- 1839–1861: The Cockatoo Inn
- 1861–1873: The Sportsman's Arms
- 1873–1885: Kilkenny Inn
- 1885–1901: The Great Western Hotel
- 1901–present: Hopetoun Hotel

== Notable performances ==
Acts who have played at the hotel include:

- Ed Kuepper
- Kim Salmon
- Died Pretty
- Hoodoo Gurus under the alias Dork Stick
- Wolfmother
- The Chemical Brothers
- Luke Vibert
- Jan Jelinek
- Sarah Blasko
- Paul Kelly
- You Am I as the Question Fruit
- Cockroaches
- The Coloured Girls
- Michael Hutchence (INXS)
- Angry Anderson
- Jenny Morris
- Tim Freedman (from The Whitlams)
- Mental as Anything
- Ratcat
- The Watchmen
- The Clouds
- The Grates
- The Jezabels
- Xiu Xiu
- Because of Ghosts
- Urthboy
- David McCormack and the Polaroids
- Smog
- Feist
- Gomez
- Spiderbait
- Powderfinger
- The Whitlams
- Paul Dempsey
- Cat Power
- Augie March
- Machine Gun Fellatio
- Gersey
- New Buffalo
- Dappled Cities
- Decoder Ring
- Architecture in Helsinki
- The Mountain Goats
