= Uncle Billy's =

Restaurant in Northbridge, Western Australia

Uncle Billy's Chinese Restaurant

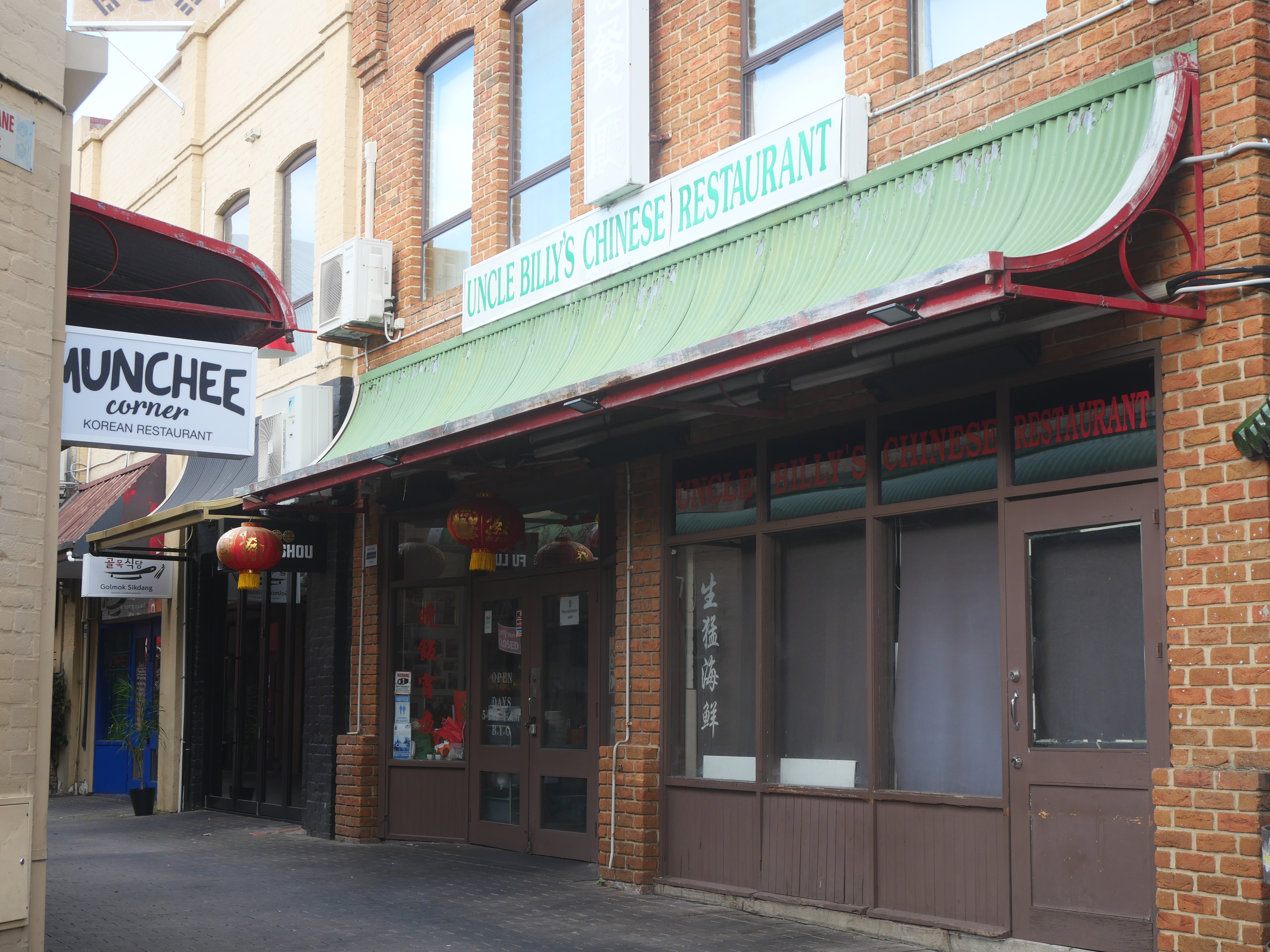
- Exterior of Uncle Billy's, 2024
- Location of Uncle Billy's within Chinatown Interactive map of Uncle Billy's Chinese Restaurant

Restaurant information
- Food type: Chinese
- Location: Shop 9, 60–66 Roe Street, Northbridge, Perth, Western Australia, 6003, Australia
- Coordinates: 31°56′57″S 115°51′27″E
- Reservations: On Friday, Saturday and Sunday nights, reservations are taken for groups comprising 10 guests or more only and may require a minimum spend
- Dining limit: 2 hours
- Website: www.uncle-billys.com.au

Uncle Billy's is a Chinese restaurant in Chinatown, a small precinct in the Perth suburb of Northbridge, Western Australia. Serving a Hong Kong style cuisine, the restaurant is popular among those seeking late-night food in the nightlife district of Northbridge.

== Description ==
Around 100 different dishes are available for order. Dishes that have been specifically praised by reviewers include the pork ribs with mayonnaise, the green kai lan in garlic sauce, and the sizzling Japanese tofu with salted fish and chicken.

The front of the restaurant is adorned by aquarium tanks containing snow crabs and crayfish. Decoration within the restaurant is minimal. The entrance is adorned with photographs of the restaurant's owner with various celebrities that have entered the restaurant.

== Reception ==
Reviewers have described the restaurant as having decor that is 'nothing special', service merely 'humorously perfunctory', and the food not being 'what you'd call delicate'. Nevertheless, professional reviews are generally favourable. However, praise for Uncle Billy's tends not to be in relation to its food, nor its quality. As one blogger noted, popularity owes to the notions of "reliability, consistency, and availability", especially for late-night revellers.

Uncle Billy's neighbours the similarly named Chinese restaurant Billy Lee's. That similarity has sparked a faux-rivalry in Perth culture.

== See also ==
- William Street Bird
- Picabar
- Nine Japanese Bistro
