= Rosemount Hotel =

Music venue in North Perth, Western Australia

- Rosemount; Rosie
- Interactive map of Rosemount Hotel
- Address: 459 Fitzgerald Street, North Perth; Perth; Australia
- Coordinates: 31°55′51″S 115°51′32″E
- Type: Music venue

Website
- rosemounthotel.com.au

Western Australia Heritage Register
- Type: City of Vincent Municipal Inventory
- Designated: 3 April 2007
- Reference no.: 14915

Rosemount Hotel, also known colloquially as Rosemount and Rosie, is a live music venue in North Perth, Western Australia. Originally built in 1902, during Western Australia's gold boom, the hotel has been continuously licensed for over a century.

== Description ==
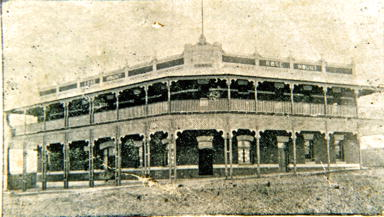
Photograph of Rosemount Hotel, taken in 1910

The venue is known to play host to local, Australian, and International acts. It has tended to play local music acts that are already somewhat established or on the rise. Some noteworthy acts known to have performed at the venue (sometimes at relatively early stages of their career) include Tame Impala, (Note: In 2008, supporting The Silents.) Hiatus Kaiyote, (Note: In 2015.) Pond, King Gizzard & the Lizard Wizard (Note: In 2014.), and The Angels (Note: In 2025 and 2026.)

The Rosemount is a mid-sized live music venue, with a main stage capacity of 550; and full house capacity of over 800. This makes it larger than some of Perth's other notable music venues, like Mojo's Bar.

== History and operations ==
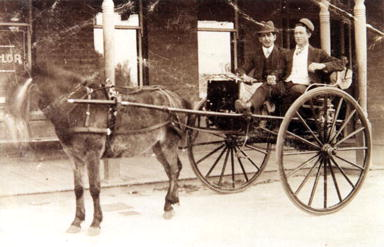
Horse and buggy outside Rosemount Hotel in 1915

The building underwent an extensive art-deco renovation in 1937, with its owner Robert Lakey spending £A 12,000, equivalent to A$1.25 million in 2022, to add refrigeration and extra wings to the bar. The Lakey family was associated with the bar in its early years.

From 1919 to 1922 an outdoor cinema operated behind the hotel, and it was also used for public meetings. It was renovated again in 2023, with a new bar area, mezzanine viewing platforms, and a D&B PA system.

The building was heritage listed in 2007.

== Notable acts ==
Some notable past acts known to have performed at the venue include: Tame Impala, Koi Child, Hiatus Kaiyote, Pond, King Gizzard & the Lizard Wizard, The Vines, Silverchair, Jebediah, Drapht, Meg Mac, Teenage Fanclub, and Eskimo Joe.

== See also ==
- William Street Bird
- Ellington Jazz Club
