= Billy Lee's =

Restaurant in Northbridge, Western Australia

Billy Lee's Chinese Restaurant

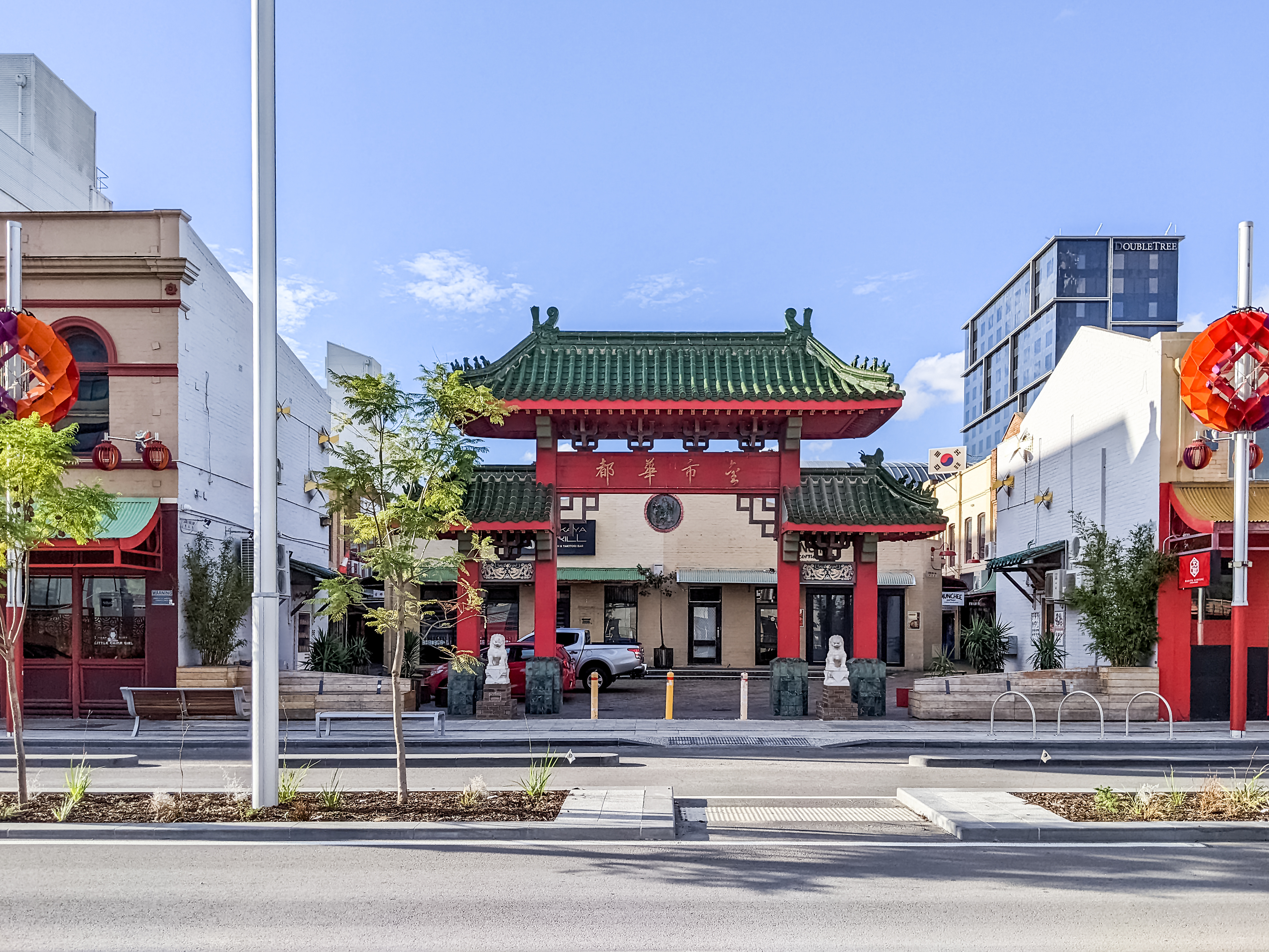
- Roe Street entrance to Chinatown
- Location of Billy Lee's within Chinatown Interactive map of Billy Lee's Chinese Restaurant

Restaurant information
- Food type: Chinese
- Location: Shop 15, 68 Roe Street, Northbridge, Perth, Western Australia, 6003, Australia
- Coordinates: 31°56′56″S 115°51′26″E

Billy Lee's is a Chinese restaurant in Chinatown, a small precinct in the Perth suburb of Northbridge, Western Australia. Serving Cantonese cuisine, the restaurant is popular for revellers in the nightlife district of Northbridge looking for Chinese food during the early morning hours.

== Description ==
The menu has been described as "typical, simplistic yet lovable". Service is quick, and portions of "old fashioned MSG-Chinese", differentiated from complexities like adaptations or fusion-style restaurants, tend to be on the larger side.

The interior of the restaurant is simple, with white tablecloths covered in plastic, and a large number of tables crammed into a small space. The clientele of the restaurant tends to be a mix of Chinese and non-Chinese Australians.

== Reception ==
Student reviewers have praised the restaurant. Other reviewers have described the restaurant as 'not the best rated', and 'not the classiest or flashiest option for Chinese in Perth'. Dishes to have received specific praised from reviewers include the spare ribs with Peking sauce, and sizzling Japanese bean curd. Another reviewer praised the 'Snow Peas and LaLa in XO Sauce'.

Evaluations of the restaurant are not universally positive. One reviewer complained of a lack of spiciness in the Chilli pepper chicken, an over-reliance on tomato sauce for flavour, overly battered or flavourless soft shell crab, and sizzling beef that had been served at room temperature.

Billy Lee's neighbours the similarly named Chinese restaurant Uncle Billy's. That similarity has sparked a faux-rivalry in Perth culture.

== See also ==
- Picabar
- Nine Japanese Bistro
