= Areias =

Areias may refer to:

== Places ==
=== Brazil ===
- Areias, São Paulo, a city in the State of São Paulo
- Areias, a neighborhood in the metropolitan área of Recife

=== Portugal ===
- Areias (Barcelos), a civil parish in the municipality of Barcelos
- Areias (Ferreira do Zêzere), a civil parish in the municipality of Ferreira do Zêzere
- Areias (Santo Tirso), a civil parish in the municipality of Santo Tirso
- Areias (Portuguese food), a Portuguese pastry cake-like biscuits

== People ==
- Areias (surname)
