= Snarnz =

Punk band from Western Australia

Snarnz, formerly known as 'Shit Narnia' are a post-hardcore punk band from Western Australia.

Perth music reviewers have described the band as trailblazers of 'Oz-Core', and a 'self-aware piss-take' of bogan culture.

== Description ==
Snarnz performing 'Claremont Boys' at William Street Bird (Feb 2022)

The four members of the band (three from Albany and one from Denmark) grew up in a 'DIY coastal metalcore scene' in South WA, prior to forming the band. The band was formed in Perth around 2013, with the groups's earliest gigs being played in suburban backyards.

For a time the band was associated with the (now inactive) Perth music collective 'Humandog'; a label associated with various underground Australian punk musicians and artists. (Note: Other bands associated with this label include: The Kramers, Teen Angst, Spaceman, Segue Safari, Spaceman, Hussy, Mung Dahl, Fox Scully)

Commentators have described the band's lyricism as having involved themes of queerness, emotional issues, 'and just feelin' like scum'.

The band has cited the Welsh hardcore band Mclusky as an early influence, and Michigan's La Dispute.

== Reception ==
Writing in 2022 for NME, Australian journalist Patrick Marlborough described the band as 'one of the best live acts in Perth'.

Vice media described the band as a 'gutter punk-outfit that's franticness pulls back to throw out poetic lyrics on class systems and confused sexuality.'

Writing of the band's 2015 single release 'Spank Rock', Anthony Cooley of MyIndieAustralia said of the band: "unlike some melo hardcore bands, this band talks about real shit in a much more sincere way, they seem to navigate talking about queerness, existential bummers, emotional issues and just feelin’ like scum in a much more honest and aesthetically driven light than is normal of the hardcore scene".

Writing for Isolated Nation Tanaya Harper described the band as: 'evoking an equally cathartic response relevant to whatever may be going on for you in life at the time. It's real and it's honest. (Hugh) responded with ‘don’t fucking tell me what to do’ when told to take off his shirt'.

== Discography ==
In 2022, the band released an LP titled 'Cloudbelt'. The LP in-part documented their experience growing up on the WA Coast, with themes involving complex relationships between people and their hometowns; particularly those that are isolated and entwined with violent colonialism. Binary modes of thinking was another prevalent theme of the album, influenced in part from the band's front Hugh Manning being non-binary.

In addition, the band has released various EPs and singles. One the band's first released singles was 'Claremont Boys'.

== Performances ==
The band has performed at Mojos, The Bird, among other venues. It was on the line-up for the Perth leg of Gizzfest.

In interviews, the band have made statements about poor crowd behaviour at gigs, and have advocated for inclusive crowd behaviour.

== See also ==
- Amyl and the Sniffers
- Rock music in Australia
