= Camp Doogs =

Camping and music festival held in Western Australia

Camp Doogs is a camping and music festival held in Western Australia's South West region. The festival has featured a number of Australian and international acts. It is held yearly in the Shire of Harvey but in previous years was held in the Shire of Nannup.

== History ==
The festival was founded in October 2013 by Perth music collective Good Times Arts Inc.

The festival has been an annual event except in 2018, when a hiatus was announced; in December its return was announced for April 2019.

== Event ==
Camp Doogs presents a range of music, visual art and activities under its unique brand and DIY aesthetic. It has set itself apart from other festivals in the country through its secret lineup, not revealed to festival goers until the day of the event. Dance music has been a significant component of the festival with recent years introducing the Deep Doogs stage with touring DJs and producers.

Visual art and activities have always been a major feature of the festival with WA artists contributing installations to the festival each year. Activities such as cheese tasting yoga, art and craft have been staples at Camp Doogs.

== Media ==
Camp Doogs was known for its lo-fi video camping tip promotional videos

== Lineups by year ==
=== 2013 ===
Sacred Flower Union, Drop Macumba, Long Lost Brothers, Mudlark ft. Nora Zion, Usurpers of Modern Medicine, Dianas, French Rockets, Nicholas Allbrook, MMHMM, Reece Walker + Alex Campbell, Catbrush, Lost/Tuneless, Diger Rokwell, Hayley Beth + Brendan Jay, Doctopus, Weapon Is Sound, Simo Soo, Sabre Tooth Tigers, Outerwaves, Catbrush, Rabbit Island, Mt Mountain, Fucking Teeth, Kucka, Hamjam, Basic Mind, Hugo Gerani, Ben Taffe, Leighton Head

=== 2014 ===
Cosmo Getz, Sarry, Reptilian Illuminati, Man in the Clouds, Mangelwurzel, Yokohomos, Bastian's Happy Flight, Eleventeen Eston, Aborted Tortoise, Felicity Groom, Hideous Sun Demon, Shit Narnia, Peter Bibby and His Bottle's of Confidence, Emlyn Johnson, Mental Powers, Gunns.

=== 2015 ===
Hootenanny, Methyl Ethel, Mathas, Mutton, Dead, Mei Saraswati, Kirin J. Callinan, Leure, Erasers, Sui Zhen, Alzabo, Injured Ninja, Kitchen People, Outlords, Sunshine Brothers, Rabbit Island, Catlips, Tim Richmond Group, Superstar, Scott and Charlene's Wedding, Grace Barbe, No Zu.

=== 2016 ===
Cate Le Bon, Antwon, Mink Mussell Creek, Olo, Pikelet, Cale Sexton, Gorsha, Verge Collection, Baseball, Soukouss Internationale, Gwenno, Krakatau, Gregor, The Shabbab, All The Weathers, Burundi Peace Choir, Sarah Mary Chadwick, Hearing, Psychedelic Desert, Mile End, Lalic, Summer Flake, Adam Said Galore, Mori Ra, Andras, DJ Aldi, Toni Yotzi, River Yarra, Liluzu, James Tom, Aslan, Jon Robson, Babicka.

=== 2017 ===
Debbie Downers, Grievous Bodily Calm, Solar Barge Big Band, Boat Show, Jacob Diamond, Yoshitake EXPE, Pussy Mothers, Broadway Sounds, PVT, Koondarm Nyoongar Choir, Childsaint, Stella Donnelly, Assad_Gulfcoast, AA Matheson, David Blumberg and the Maraby Band, Home Baked, Two Steps on the Water, Good Morning, These New South Whales, Drowning Horse, Baro, Terrible Truths, Holy Balm, Michael Ozone, DJ Sports, Central, D. Tiffany, Phillips Head, Mousse, Zobs Palace, Barry Sunset, Ben Taaffe, Bun Dem, Burke + Wills, Captain Oshi, Rok Riley, Consulate, Roza Terenzi, Jack Dutrac, Toni Yozi, Mu-Mu, Paradice iii, Reef Prince, Willy Slade.

=== 2019 ===
Lucky Pete, Basic Mind, Elena Hickey, Anuraag, Salty, Cooper, Anuraag, Grim Lusk, John Hayes, Midnight Elevator, Bun Dem, Mascara Snakes, Last Quokka, Soft Approach, Adrian Dzvuke, Boyname, Aborted Tortoise, Chico G, C. Frim, DJ Mum, Mike Midnight, Dream FM, Furchick, Magic Steven, Wild Tone, Butter, Fraeya, Rok Riley, Ben Fester, Alzabo, Carla Geneve, Ash Baroque, David Chesworth, Gordon Koang, Raj Mahal, DJ Plead, Jess Zammit, Pjenné, Raccoo, Emlyn Johnson, AA Matheson, Big Cry, Feast of Snakes, Double Think Prism.

== Awards ==
- 2016 WAM - Most Popular Music Event
