= Mace Francis =

- Born: August 23, 1978 (age 46); Geelong, Victoria, Australia
- Instrument(s): guitar, trombone
- Website: macefrancis.com

Mace Francis (born 1978) is an Australian composer, band director, and academic.

== Career ==
Francis moved to Perth, Western Australia from Victoria in 2000 to study jazz composition and arranging. He graduated from WA Academy of Performing Arts in 2004 and completed a PhD at Edith Cowan University in 2015.

In 2003, he was nominated for the Australian Jazz Bell Awards' Best Australian Jazz Song of the Year for Land Speed Record off his album of the same name The album was recorded with a nonet in New York and included American saxophonist Jon Gordon. It was released on Listen/Hear Collective, a record label run by Francis and Johannes Luebbers in Perth.

In 2005, Francis formed the Mace Francis Orchestra and they released seven albums over the next 15 years. Their album Music for Average Photography was nominated for two awards, making the 2016 Australian Jazz Bell Awards shortlist for Best Australian Jazz Ensemble, and winning 2015's Art Music Awards for Jazz Work of the Year.

Since 2008, Francis has been Artistic Director of the West Australian Youth Jazz Orchestra, and Musical Director for their Wednesday Night Orchestra. He has also held the position of Festival Director at the Perth International Jazz Festival since 2017 after the festivals founder and previous Festival Director Graham Wood died.

For his 2021 album Isolation Emancipation, Francis recorded himself playing the trombone for the first time, after he began learning the instrument in 2015. The album was released with a new band Mace Francis Plus 11.

== Awards ==
Year	Awarding body	Award	Work	Outcome
2016	Australian Jazz Bell Awards	Best Australian Jazz Ensemble	Music for Average Photography – Mace Francis Orchestra	Nominated
2015	Art Music Awards	Jazz Work of the Year	Music for Average Photography	Won
2015	WAM Song of the Year	Jazz Song of the Year	Corio Landscape	Nominated
2013	Australian Jazz Bell Awards	Best Australian Jazz Song of the Year	Land Speed Record	Nominated
2004	APRA AMCOS	APRA Professional Development Award		Won

== Academic papers ==
From traffic rises: Site specificity and the compositional process (2016)

Music in Site: Integrating elements of site-specificity into composition (2015)

Site in Sound: A Review of Four Musical Works that Integrate Site Into Sound (2012) with Cat Hope

Bob Brookmeyer: composer, performer, pedagogue (2006)
