= Areias (surname) =

Areias is a surname. Notable people with the surname include:

- Juliana Areias (born 1975), Brazilian singer-songwriter, also known as The Bossa Nova Baby
- Miguel Areias (born 1977), Portuguese footballer
- Renan Areias (born 1998), Brazilian footballer
- Rui Areias (born 1993), Portuguese footballer
- Rusty Areias (born 1949), American politician

== See also ==
- Areias (disambiguation)
