= Harry Mitchell (musician) =

Australian jazz musician

Harry Mitchell playing piano at the Ellington Jazz Club

Harry Mitchell is a jazz musician from Perth, Western Australia.

== Biography ==
Harry started playing the piano when he was at the age of 8, and took up jazz when he was 13 years old. He completed his studies at Carey Baptist College, participating in its jazz program.

He has played internationally, and performed with notable artists, such as, Jamie Oehlers, Mace Francis, Charlie Watts of the Rolling Stones, Katy Steele of Little Birdy, Hank Marvin, Veronica Swift, Vincent Gardner, Kate Ceberano, among others. He also played a supporting gig for George Benson.

In 2014, he won the prize for best recitalist at the Western Australian Academy of Performing Arts, for jazz studies. In 2018, he was a member of the Daniel Susnjar Afro-Peruvian Jazz Group.

In 2017, he was awarded Young Australian Jazz Artist of the Year at the Jazz Bell Awards. He has twice won WAM jazz song of the year.

== Own work ==
Harry Mitchell playing piano in a quartet, in association with the album 'Archetypes' in 2022

Harry released his 13th studio album, 'Archetypes', in late 2022. The recording was inspired by Jung's theory of universal human consciousness, and the idea that musicians use musical archetypes; or universal or recurring mental images to communicate ideas with each other and their audience.

The tracks of the release were named for theories and concepts within Jung's work. Contributing musicians to the recording included Jamie Oehlers and Ben Vanderwal. The album received positive critical responses.

== See also ==
- Ellington Jazz Club
- Australian Jazz
