= Perth International Jazz Festival =

Annual jazz festival held in Perth, Western Australia

- Status: Active
- Genre: Music festival
- Frequency: Annually
- Locations: Perth, Western Australia
- Country: Australia
- Inaugurated: 2013
- Founder: Graham Wood
- Website: perthjazzfest.com

The Perth International Jazz Festival (PIJF) is an annual jazz festival event held over three days in early November. This jazz festival incorporates both ticketed and free community events. Its location over the festival weekend spans across the CBD of Perth, the cultural precinct area of Northbridge, through to Hyde Park in the City of Vincent.

== History ==
The Perth International Jazz Festival was founded by associate professor and jazz pianist Graham Wood. Wood served as Festival Director until his death in 2017 and was replaced by Mace Francis.

The first festival in 2013 was ranked 4th in Time Out's "Top 7 Australian Jazz Festivals" (August 2013) and featured in the West Australian's Art's "Best in the West" (2013). The lineup featured international acts such as Joe Lovano, Katie Noonan and Vince Jones, local jazz performers like Jamie Oehlers and Libby Hammer, and jazz-based organisations such as WAYJO, WAAPA and JazzWA.

== Past festival highlights ==
=== 2014 ===
Vocalist Kate Ceberano headlined PIJF 2014, accompanied by the PIJF All-Star Big Band. In addition, the festival featured multiple international acts including contemporary jazz musician Greg Osby (USA), esteemed jazz guitarist Peter Bernstein (USA), multi-award-winning vocalist Kristin Berardi (Brisbane) and Thirsty Merc front-man, Rai Thistlethwayte (Sydney).

The 2014 Festival also featured popular local acts such as saxophonist Carl Mackey, pianist Harry Mitchell, trumpeter Matt Jodrell and drummer Daniel Susnjar.

=== 2015 ===
In 2015, the Festival launched with a performance by local jazz singer Libby Hammer. Attendees included founder Graham Wood and former Lord Mayor of Perth Lisa Scaffidi.

PIJF launched a new collaboration with Celebrate WA for the WA Day Long Weekend, sharing stages at the Perth Cultural Centre. ‘Jazz at the Cultural Centre’ featured the Festival's headline artists including US jazz bassist Richard Bona (NYC) and pianist/composer Barney McAll, as well as a range of local musicians.

In addition, major venue Brookfield Place was transformed into the ‘Jazz Quarter’, based on New Orleans’ famous French Quarter. Featuring three outdoor stages among Perth bars, acts performing in the Jazz Quarter included Perth band the Zydecats, the Howie Morgan Band, as well as Brazil’s Juliana Areias.

=== 2016 ===
For the first time, PIJF 2016 hosted several free performances in St George’s Cathedral and Cathedral Square, including shows from Alexandre da Costa & the Graham Wood Trio, as well as Chris McNulty's performance of her orchestral album Eternal.

PIJF 2016 featured US-based headline acts Hiatus Kaiyote and Yellowjackets. Yellowjackets' performance saw the return of Perth-based bassist Dane Alderson to his hometown.

=== 2017 ===
2017 saw the introduction of PIJF venues in the Shire of York, as well as a partnership with Brookfield Place which hosted a number of free performances.

International acts included Will Vinson (NYC); vocalist Vivan Sessoms (NYC) and bassist and composer Rafael Jerjen (Switzerland). In addition, acclaimed Japanese pianist Satoko Fujii and trumpeter Natsuki Tamura joined to perform Fujii's new work Fukushima, a suite "composed in the memory of those affected by the 2011 earthquake."

PIJF 2017 also hosted New York-based jazz musician, composer and arranger Kavita Shah, performing with bassist Sam Anning, a fellow Manhattan School of Music student.

National performers included vocalist and ARIA Award nominee Emma Pask, as well as Perth-born, New York-based pianist Tal Cohen.

=== 2018 ===
2018 saw the return of Kate Ceberano to Perth, teaming up with local saxophonist Carl Mackey to pay tribute to the 1961 soul-jazz album ‘Nancy Wilson & Cannonball Adderley’.

Other international acts included Sara McDonald (NYC) leading a 22-piece progressive jazz orchestra, as well as Trio Elf (DEU).

Local performers included jazz vocalist Libby Hammer, leading community event the "Jazz Club Choir".

=== 2019 ===
In 2019, PIJF's programme of free events expanded to include performances at Perth Cultural Centre's Wetlands Stage (supported by Lotterywest, City of Perth & Edith Cowan University), The Rechabite, and Birdwood Square (supported by Lotterywest and City of Vincent).

The 2019 Festival featured several international artists, including US jazz singer Veronica Swift, trumpeter Roscoe James Irwin of The Cat Empire and The Bamboos, and Japanese pianist Fumio Itabashi.

Local artists included pianist Tim Voutas, performing compositions from debut album Introducing TVQ; as well as Perth-born bassist Sam Anning returning home after time spent in New York and Melbourne.

=== 2020 ===
Despite the COVID-19 pandemic, PIJF was able to go ahead in 2020. The 2020 programme featured new free events aimed at families and the community, including:

- a Jazz Parade and a Jazz Picnic in the Park at Hyde Park
- performances from ex-pats Linda May Han Oh and Tal Cohen
- a 1920s-style Cotton Club Dance Party
- a Jazz Dinner event at the Alex Hotel.

Traditional Festival venues continued to support PIJF, including a free opening night in the State Theatre Courtyard in collaboration with RTRFM 92.1, and free daytime concerts at Northbridge Piazza. Other events included artist-in-conversations at the Alex Hotel, and PIJF Jam Sessions at The Ellington Jazz Club.

Local drummer and WAAPA lecturer Dr Daniel Susnjar released an Afro-Peruvian jazz album titled The Recipe featuring students from the WAAPA Jazz Performance course, and music from the album was performed at a free concert as part of PIJF 2020.

== PIJF venues ==
Across the life of the festival, musicians have performed at venues across the Perth Metropolitan area.

=== City of Vincent ===
The City of Vincent has been a supporter of the Perth International Jazz Festival since its inception.

Support from the City of Vincent has provided PIJF with performances spaces such as:

- Weld Square
- Birdwood Square Community Stage
- Hyde Park
- East Perth Power Station.

In addition, a range of bars, restaurants and other businesses in the City of Perth became a part of PIJF.

=== City of Perth ===
The City of Perth has also been a major supporting partner of PIJF since the very first festival, providing performance venues such as:

- The Spiegel Tent
- Bishop's See Gardens
- Perth Cultural Centre
- The Wetlands Stage
- State Theatre Centre
- The Heath Ledger Theatre
- Forrest Chase
- Perth Concert Hall
- St George's Cathedral & Cathedral Square
- Downstairs At The Maj (His Majesty's Theatre).

=== Shire of York ===
In 2017, PIJF expanded its reach to form a partnership with the Shire of York, allowing regional fans to attend PIJF performances more easily.

This allowed performances to be held at more regional venues in York, including:

- Castle Hotel
- Settler's House
- The Flourmill Cafe.
