= Chris McNulty =

Australian and American jazz vocalist

- Born: December 23, 1953 (age 72); Melbourne, Victoria, Australia
- Genres: Jazz; Pop; Funk; R&B
- Occupations: Studio-session singer, composer, jazz vocalist, educator
- Years active: 1978 – present
- Labels: Warner Chappell Music, Amosaya Records, Elefant Dreams, Challenge Records
- Awards: Australian Bell Award, Bundanon Trust Prelude Composer Residency

Chris McNulty (born December 23, 1953) is an Australian and American jazz vocalist composer, and educator. She has recorded eight studio albums and has performed internationally as a jazz vocalist. She was based in New York City for 28 years before relocating back to Australia in October 2015.

== Life and career ==
McNulty was born in Melbourne, Victoria, Australia. She began her professional career singing in pop bands in hotels and clubs in and around the city at age 16. She then toured Australia in pop, funk and R&B bands. In 1975, she settled back in Melbourne gaining steady work as a studio-session singer. In 1978, she formed her first jazz ensemble with Melbourne musicians, Paul Grabowsky, David Jones, Matt Kirsch, and Hermann Schwaiger. McNulty moved to Sydney in late 1979 and continued to support her jazz career as a studio-session singer. In 1988, she moved to New York City, having been awarded an international study grant from the Music Board of the Australia Council.

In 1991, McNulty released her first American album, Waltz for Debbie, on the Discovery label. The recording included her vocal interpretation of Miles Davis’ “Blue in Green,” for which her lyrics were later officially published by Warner Chappell Music.

In 1995, she released Time for Love on Amosaya Records, a collaboration with co-producer and guitarist, the late Peter Leitch.

McNulty later released I Remember You (2004), Dance Delicioso (2005), and Whispers the Heart (2006), all of which were issued through Elefant Dreams, an independent label she co-founded in 2005 with guitarist Paul Bollenback.

McNulty has performed and recorded with the late Mulgrew Miller, John Hicks, George Mraz, Tony Reedus, Peter Leitch, Montez Coleman and Frank Wess. She has also collaborated and performed with long time colleagues Ugonna Okegwo, John Di Martino, Gary Bartz, Gary Thomas, Ingrid Jensen, Tim Garland, Tineke Postma, Billy Hart, Dave Pietro, Joe Locke, Greg Hutchinson, Marcus Gilmore, Matt Wilson, Adam Cruz, Kenny Washington, Joel Frahm, Gary Versace, David Budway, Harvey S, Andrei Kondakov, Igor Butman, and Paul Bollenback.

In 2006, she curated the inaugural Belize Jazz Festival. McNulty has performed at several international jazz festivals, including the Edinburgh Jazz Festival, Dundee Jazz Festival, Brecon Jazz Festival (UK), Kilkenny Arts Festival (Ireland), Kharkiv International Jazz Festival (Ukraine), Petrozavodsk International Jazz Festival (Russia), and in Australia, at the Perth International Jazz Festival, Wangaratta Jazz & Blues Festival, Stonnington Jazz Festival, Dunsborough Jazz by the Bay, and the Melbourne International Jazz Festival.

Her recordings and live performances have received coverage in publications such as DownBeat, JazzTimes, The Irish Times, Jazz Wise, All About Jazz, and The Australian. As an educator, McNulty has been invited to present clinics and workshops at Monash University and University of Melbourne, Victoria College of the Arts (Melbourne), Griffith University (Brisbane), the West Australian Academy of Performing Arts (WAAPA, Perth), the Australian Institute of Music (AIM, Sydney) and the University of South Australia (Adelaide).

Prior to the death of her son, Sam McNulty (aka Chap One) in July 2011, McNulty collaborated with him, guitarist Paul Bollenback, and other musicians on his recording ‘Strange Frequencies’, produced in New York City in 2007. This recording was later released posthumously in March 2012, along with two other projects, Future History, and For The Peoples Sake which were collaborations with his Melbourne based colleagues, James Hebblethwaite (aka Durban Poison) and Nate Smith (aka Tony Wolf).

In 2012, the Dutch Label, Challenge Records Int released her album The Song That Sings You Here, which won the Australian Bell Award for Best Australian Jazz Vocal Album the following year (2013). Her 2015 album Eternal placed No. 11 in the DownBeat Readers Poll for Album of the Year (2015) and was included in year-end best album lists by DownBeat and JazzTimes.

After residing in the United States, primarily based in NYC since 1988, McNulty returned to Australia in 2015. In 2016, she toured nationally with her Eternal chamber ensemble project. In 2017, McNulty published VCM – Vocalist as Complete Musician, a vocal jazz method that explores the use of tetrachords to integrate theory, ear training, and improvisation.

In 2018, she was selected as one of six Australian composers to receive a Bundanon Trust Prelude Composer Residency. The residency supported a year-long composition project completed at Gallop House in Perth, Western Australia. It culminated in the 12-piece suite Finding Home – Other Australian Stories, reflecting narratives of refugees and immigrants in Australia. The work remains unrecorded.

In 2026, McNulty released Soul Journey, her eighth studio album and first recorded in Australia.

== Awards and honours ==
- Australian Bell Award for Best Australian Jazz Vocal Album for The Song That Sings You Here (2013).
- Eternal placed No. 11 in the DownBeat Readers Poll for Album of the Year (2015) and was included in year-end best albums lists by DownBeat and JazzTimes (2015)
- Selected as one of six Australian composers for a 2019 Bundanon Trust Prelude Composer Residency in 2018.

== Discography ==
- Waltz for Debbie (Discovery, 1991)
- Time for Love (Amosaya, 1996co-produced with guitarist Peter Leitch and featured musicians including John Hicks and Gary Bartz)
- I Remember You (MopTop, 2004) re-reissued on Elefant Dreams, 2005)
- Dance Delicioso (Elefant Dreams, 2005)
- Whispers the Heart (Elefant Dreams, 2006)
- The Song That Sings You Here (Challenge, 2012)
- Eternal (Palmetto, 2015; Pearl Coast Jazz, reissued 2023)
- Soul Journey (Pearl Coast Jazz, 2026)

== Personal life ==
McNulty's son, Sam McNulty, died in 2011. He was also the son of saxophonist Kenny Garrett.
