= Areias (Portuguese food) =

Portuguese sandie cake-like pastries

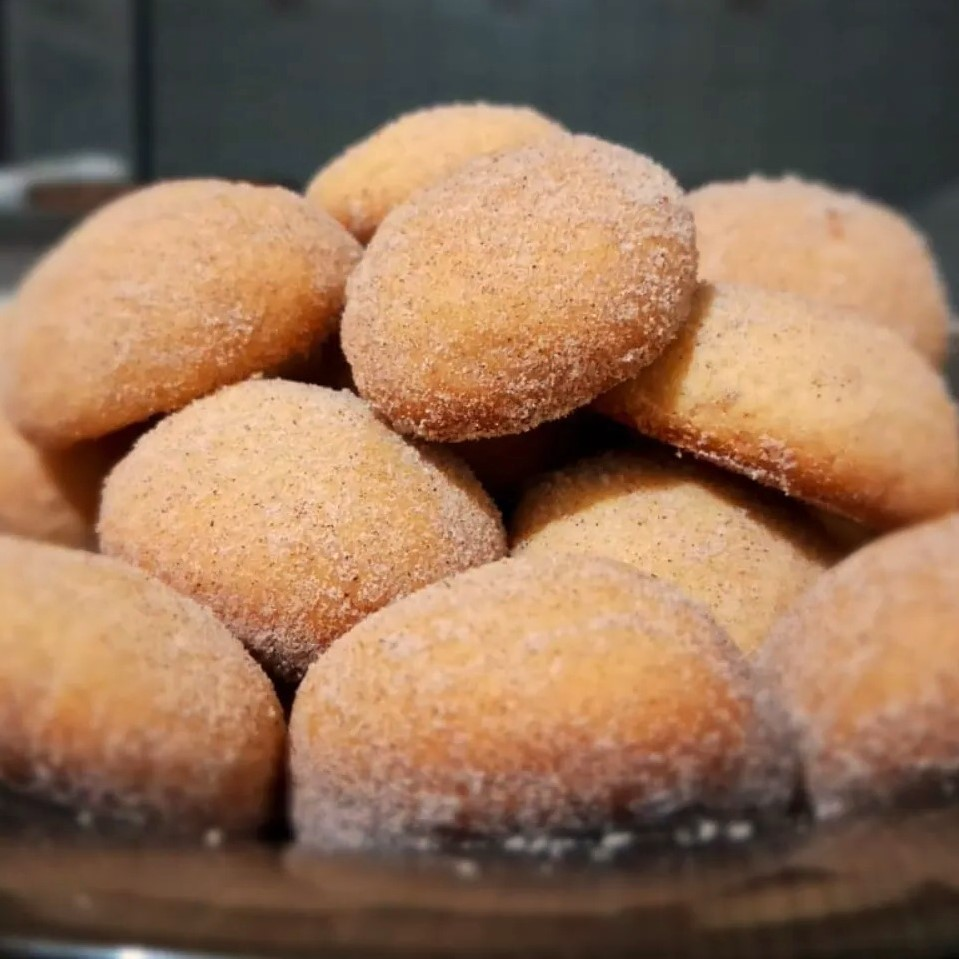
- Areias coated with sugar-cinnamon
- Alternative names: Bolacha; bolacinha
- Type: Biscuit
- Place of origin: Portugal
- Main ingredients: Wheat flour, almond (or hazelnuts), eggs, lard
- Ingredients generally used: Lemon zest, cinnamon
- Similar dishes: Sandie (cookie), shortbread, Russian tea cake, snickerdoodle

Areias (singular: areia, lit. 'sand') are small traditional Portuguese pastries similar to cakes and biscuits. They are commonly coated with coarse-grain sugar ("sanding sugar"), and sometimes cinnamon, which resemble sand for which areias are named after.

== Variants ==
Areias de Cascais (lit. 'areias from Cascais') or simply areias. The traditional recipe calls for dough made of flour mixed with lard (or butter), rolled into balls the size of walnuts, that is baked without the use of a leavening agent. The biscuits are then coated in coarse-grain sugar. Some modern recipes optionally use lemon zest or vanilla, or incorporate ground almonds and glacé cherries. Because of the simplicity of recipe, variations exists throughout Portugal.

- Areias do Sorraia (lit. 'areias from Sorraia River') are similar to areias de Cascais but made extensively with lard and dusted with cinnamon. Cinnamon brought back from Asia was a product of Portuguese Exploration in 16th century resulting its incorporation into Portuguese cuisine.
- Areias de Sintra (lit. 'areias from Sintra') are described similar to Russian tea cakes, using hazelnuts common to the area. The biscuits are also coated in powdered sugar after baking.
- Areias de gengibre (lit. 'ginger areias') a recipe by Nestlé, adds fresh ground ginger and lemon zest. It may also be topped with dulce de leche for areias de Doce de leite.
- Areias de chocolate (cacau) (lit. 'chocolate (cocoa) areias') incorporate cocoa powder into the dough.

Areias Brancas
- Type: Cake
- Place of origin: Portugal
- Region or state: Lourinhã
- Created by: Eugenia Perdigão, Maria Luísa Pereira
- Main ingredients: Almond, egg yolks, sugar
- Variations: Aguardente
- Similar dishes: Madeleine (cake)

Areias Brancas (lit. 'white sands') are moist flourless cakes containing finely ground almonds, egg yolks, and sugar. Unlike other areias which are formed like cookie dough, this cake is made with a batter that are baked into small individual molds. After baking, the cakes topped with sanding sugar.

The original unnamed cake recipe is believed to be derived from a conventual sweet created in Lisbon. When the over two-century year old cake recipe was taken out from the convent to Lourinhã, it was named after the nearby beach Praia da Areia Branca. This traditional product is now a trademarked product made solely by a single family bakery, Casa das Areias Brancas. In recent years, the bakery has also incorporated aguardente as an ingredient.

In 2016, it was featured at the Cannes Lions International Festival of Creativity in a video entitled "The Most Famous Unknown Cake".

== See also ==
- Conventual sweets
- Portuguese cuisine
