= Chinatown, Perth =

Small precinct in Northbridge, Western Australia

Chinatown
- Precinct
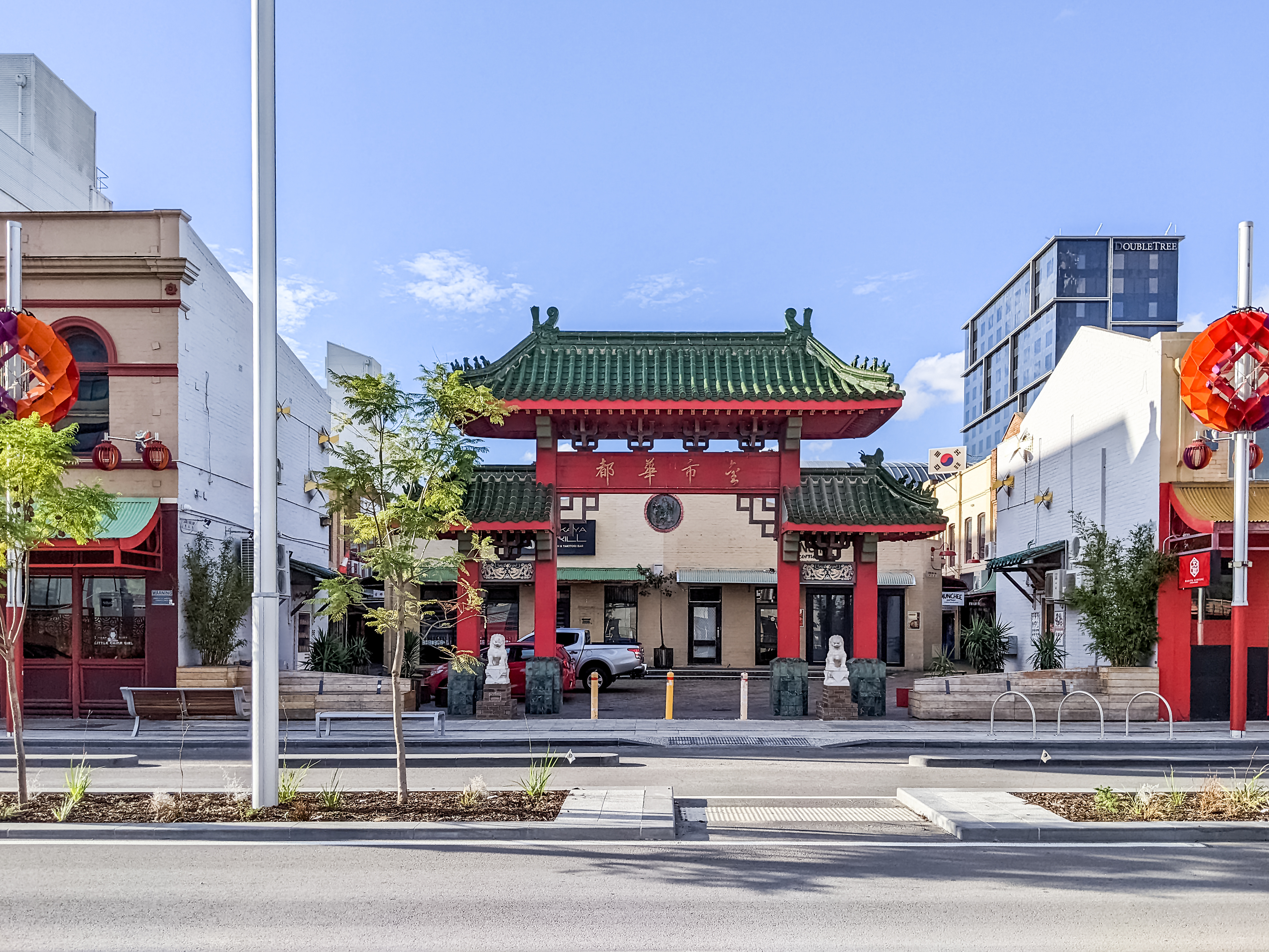
- Entrance to Chinatown
- Interactive map of Chinatown
- Coordinates: 31°56′56″S 115°51′26″E
- Country: Australia
- State: Western Australia
- City: Perth
- Suburb: Northbridge

Area
  - Total: 0.3028 ha (0.748 acres)

Dimensions
  - Length: 0.062 km (0.039 mi)
  - Width: 0.049 km (0.030 mi)

Chinatown in Northbridge, an inner city suburb of Perth, Western Australia is bounded by Roe Street, Nicks Lane, the businesses facing James Street, and the Roe Street car park. Located within Chinatown are 13 Chinese, Japanese and Korean restaurants and businesses. However, many more Asian businesses are found further north around William Street near Brisbane Street, an area known informally for this reason as the real Chinatown.

The City of Vincent, whose boundary with the City of Perth runs along Newcastle Street approximately 425 metres (1,394 ft) north of Chinatown, has installed Asiatic themed street lights and street furniture to reflect the proliferation of Asian businesses – such as at the corner of William Street and Forbes Road within their part of the suburb of Perth. Businesses include restaurants, hair salons, grocery stores, travel agencies, Daiguo shipping companies, and medicine shops. The Vietnamese Buddhist Association and Temple is also located just off William Street on Money Street.

== History ==
While the northern vicinity of the Perth central business district has always had a high proportion of non-Anglo-Celtic migrants, its make-up has changed with time. During the 1970s and 1980s, during which the Vietnam War ended and the Indochina refugee crisis began, the area housed Vietnamese migrants. Prior to this there was a Jewish quarter with Jewish businesses in the area; some still remain but are primarily landowners. Well known migrant business Kakulas Brothers still operate their wholesale operations off William Street on Wellman Street. From 2010 there has been a steady increase of mainland Chinese businesses as well as Korean businesses operating in the area.

Historically many Chinese (usually of Malaysian, Singaporean or Indonesian background) settled in Northbridge alongside other immigrant groups. However, the city's low population density and comparatively low-cost property encourages migrants to move to the expanding suburbs. Likewise, overseas students often chose to live in suburbs near the universities they attend, such as Bentley, Murdoch and Nedlands.

== Culture ==
The Northbridge Chinatown location serves as a hub for Chinese cultural events, such as the annual Chung Wah Perth Chinese New Year fair. This event has involved multiple stalls, entertainment and activities along a closed to traffic James Street, as well as the Northbridge Piazza and Yagan Square. The Chung Wah Association representing Western Australia's Chinese diaspora has been based in Chung Wah Hall on James Street since 1911.

== Transport ==
The closest train station to Chinatown is Perth railway station, to its south-east on the southern side of Roe Street. The Perth Busport is about 50 metres (160 ft) south of the precinct.

== See also ==
- Billy Lee's
- Uncle Billy's
