= Juliana Areias =

Brazilian singer-songwriter (born 1975)

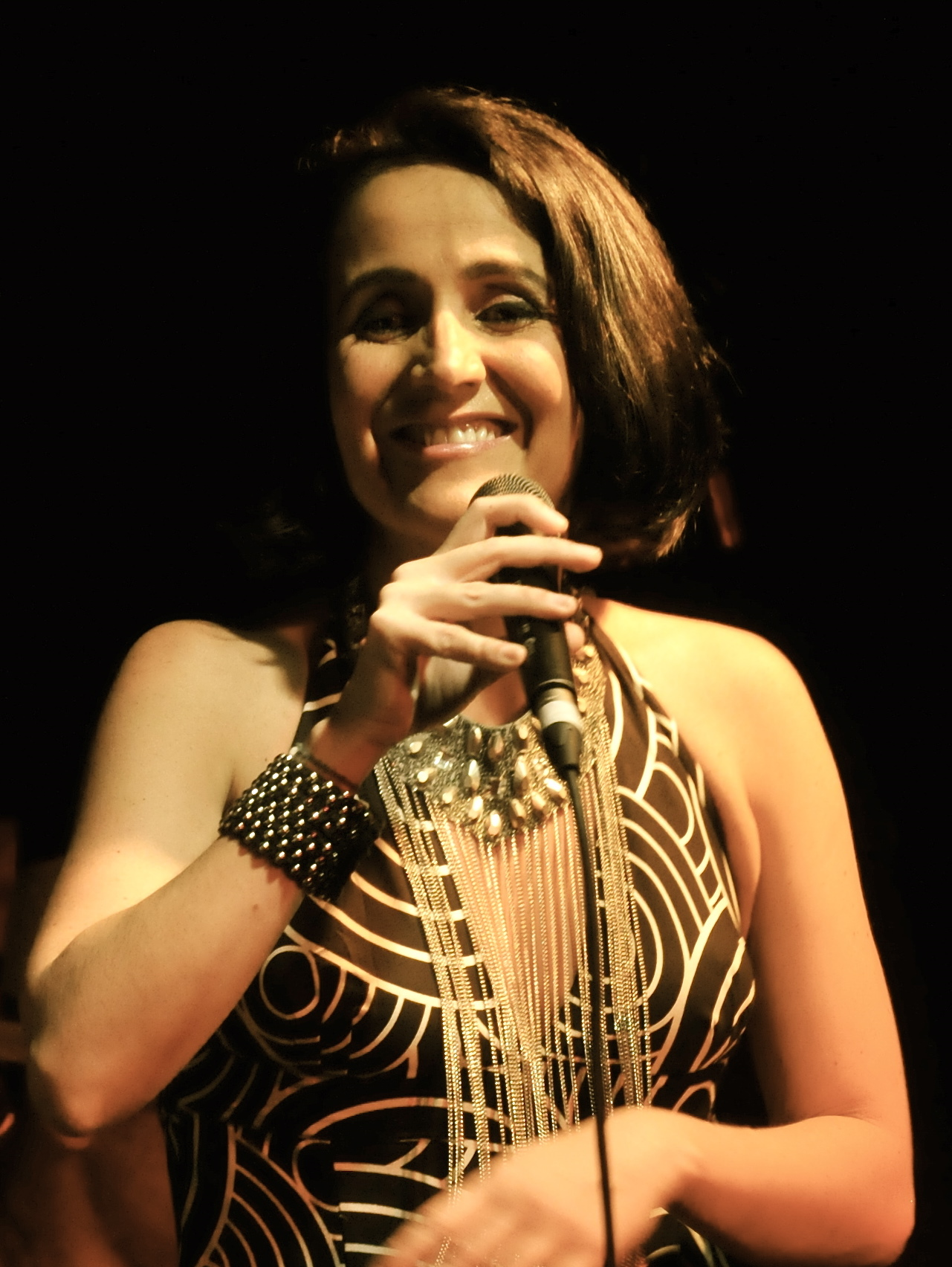
- Juliana Areias at the Ellington Jazz Club, Perth, Western Australia (2011).

Background information
- Also known as: Bossa Nova Baby
- Born: Juliana Vasconcellos Mendes; 7 February 1975 (age 51); São Paulo, Brazil
- Genre: Bossa nova
- Occupation: singer-songwriter
- Years active: 1996–present
- Website: julianaareias.com

Juliana Areias (often referred to as The Bossa Nova Baby) is a Brazilian singer-songwriter based in Australia. She is best known for her Bossa nova-style and her album Bossa Nova Baby, released in 2015. She has toured internationally and also recorded six albums with Márcio Catunda.

== Early life ==
Areias was born in São Paulo and exposed to music from a young age. As a teenager, Areias met Ruy Castro, a journalist known for documenting much of the early Bossa nova movement. She attributes Castro and her direct exposure to the movement as her inspiration to become a singer. It was also Castro who originally gave her the nickname "The Bossa Nova Baby." She was also introduced to musicians such as Ronaldo Bôscoli and Luiz Eça. She moved to Switzerland at the age of 21 to pursue her career as a singer-songwriter.

== Career ==
Areias lived in Europe and New Zealand in her early career. During that time she performed at major music festivals and toured internationally. She performed at events including Montreux Jazz Festival, Auckland Festival, and American's Cup in New Zealand. In addition to touring and performing, Areias was the Brazilian Music Expert and research assistant for the University of Auckland's "Freesamba Project" and recorded for Brazilian poet and composer Márcio Catunda between 1997 and 2010. She was featured on six of his albums including Anima Lirica (1997), Crescente (2000), Mistica Beleza (2003), Itineraria Sentimental (2008), Agua de Flores (2009) and O Jardineiro da Vida (2010).

Areias moved to Perth in 2009. In 2014, she performed consecutive sold-out shows in Australia, leading up to the release of her debut album. In 2015, Areias released Bossa Nova Baby, her first original album which she recorded with jazz musicians including Doug de Vries, Pete Jeavons, Graham Wood, Ray Walker, Marcio Mendes, Chris Tarr, and Paul Millard. The album contains 12 songs, all of which were influenced by the places she has lived and traveled. The album was funded by a successful crowdfunding campaign on the Australian crowdfund site Pozible and was also sponsored by the Department of Culture and the Arts of Western Australia.

After releasing the album, Areias performed at a sold-out launch concert for the album at the Ellington Jazz Club in Perth. She then performed nationally, giving performances at the Sydney Opera House and Perth International Jazz Festival. The album received air play on radio stations throughout Australia, Brazil, Europe, and the United States.

== Discography ==
=== Original albums ===
Original albums
Title	Album details
Bossa Nova Baby	Released: February 2015; Label: self-produced; Format: CD, digital download

=== Collaborations ===
Collaborations as featured artist
Title	Album details
Anima Lirica	Released: 1997; Artist: Márcio Catunda
Crescente	Released: 2000; Artist: Márcio Catunda
Mistica Beleza	Released: 2003; Artist: Márcio Catunda
Itinerario Sentimental	Released: 2008; Artist: Márcio Catunda
Agua de Flores	Released: 2009; Artist: Márcio Catunda
O Jardineiro da Vida	Released: 2010; Artist: Márcio Catunda

== Awards and nominations ==
Award Title	Recognition details
USA Top 100 Jazz Charts – Jazz Week	Top No. 70 – 16 September 2019; Top No. 79 – 23 September 2019; Top No. 97 – 30 September 2019; Top No. 84 – 14 October 2019; Top No. 87 – 21 October 2019
Focus Brasil Awards 2019 – South Florida	Award winner – Best Brazilian Album released in the USA; "Juliana Areias – Bossa Nova Baby " Album
WAM Awards Western Australia Music Awards 2019	Nominated – Best World Music Act Juliana Areias
WAM Awards Western Australia Music Awards 2016	Nominated – Best World Music Act Juliana Areias
WAM Awards Western Australia Music Awards 2015	Nominated – Best World Music Act Juliana Areias
WAM SOTY Awards Western Australia Music Awards 2015	Nominated – Best Song of the year – World Music Category; Song: “Mare Cheia” (Full Tide)by Juliana Areias / Jahannes Dimyadi: Nominated – Best Song of the year – World Music Category; Song: “Flecha” (Arrow) by Juliana Areias / Glenn Roggers
