= Perth Institute of Contemporary Arts =

Arts organisation and heritage-listed building in Perth, Western Australia

- Location: City of Perth, Australia
- Website: pica.org.au
- Building details
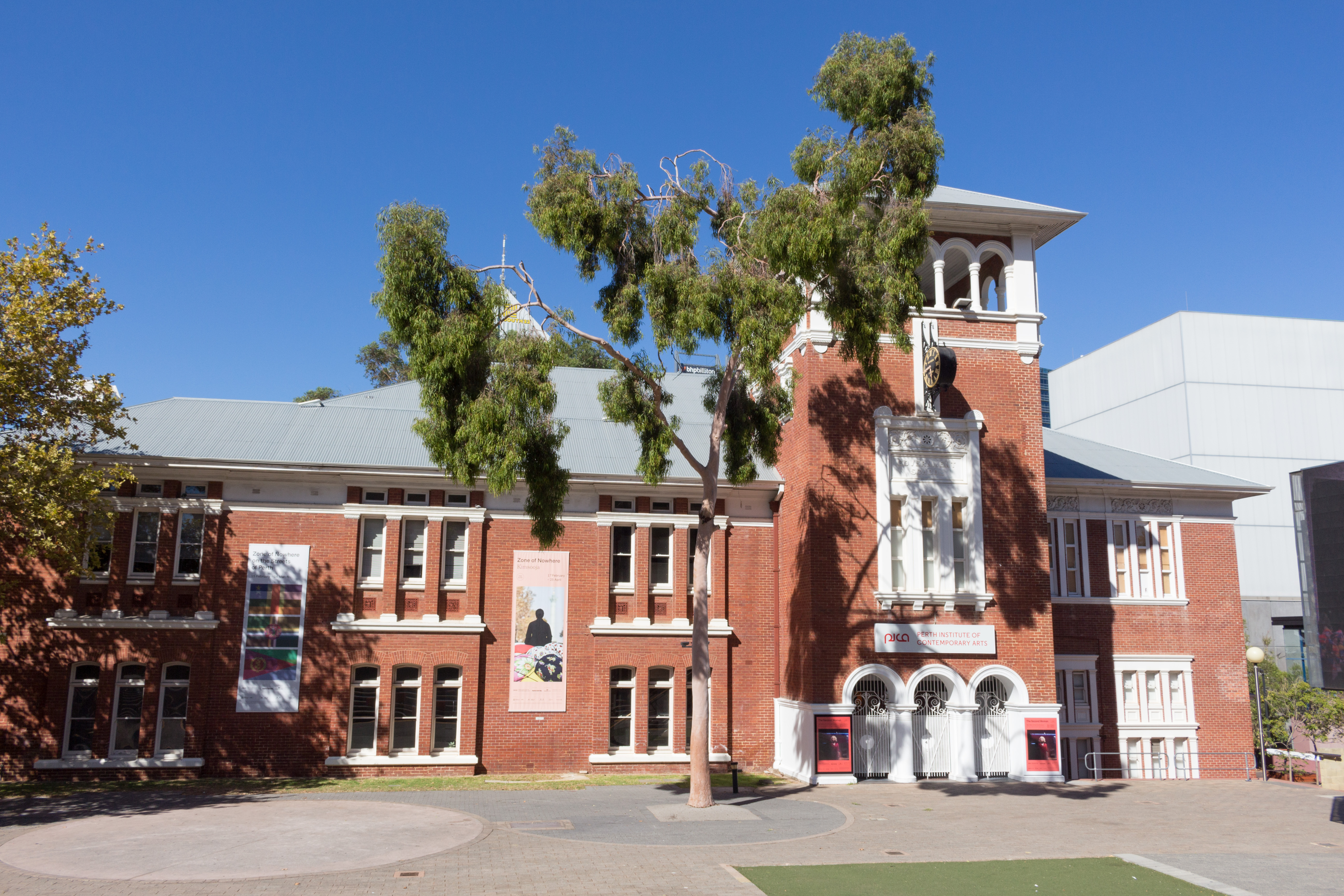
- Perth Institute of Contemporary Arts building

General information
- Type: Heritage-listed building
- Location: City of Perth, Western Australia
- Coordinates: 31°56′59″S 115°51′37″E

Western Australia Heritage Register
- Type: State Registered Place
- Designated: 24 March 2000
- Reference no.: 2028

Perth Institute of Contemporary Arts (PICA) is a contemporary visual and performance arts venue located in a heritage-listed building in Perth, Western Australia.

== History ==
=== 1896–1959: Schools ===
The building at 51 James Street, which dates from 1896, was for 40 years the Perth Boys' and Girls' School (one of several schools known collectively as Perth Central School). The Perth Central School was developed principally between 1877 and 1914. It amalgamated the Infants' School, Perth Boys' School, Perth Girls' School, Manual Training School and Normal School on the one site between Roe and James Streets.

On 22 May 1895, the contract to construct Perth Boys' and Girls' Schools building in James Street was awarded to William Atkins for the sum of £10,452, equivalent to A$1.9 million in 2022. Soon after the contract was awarded, the plans were altered to include an extra eight classrooms, however only six of these were constructed at the time. On 18 January 1897, the new Perth Boys' and Girls' School building, which had been completed a few months earlier, was officially opened by Edward Wittenoom, the Minister for Education. The first headmaster was W J Rooney. The Education Department Report for the year 1896, stated:

The new Central Boys' and Girls' Schools, which had been in the course of erection on the reserve in James Street, Perth, for some nine or ten months, were completed at the end of the year. ... The buildings provide accommodation for 500 boys on the ground floor and 500 girls on the upper floor.

The construction of the Boys' School was the largest project undertaken for the Education Department in the 1890s. In April 1900, further additions to the Perth Boys' and Girls' Schools building were completed. The additions included two classrooms: one for the boys and one for the girls, each designed to house seventy-five children.

In September 1936, the new Perth Girls' School opened in East Perth and the entire building was used by the Boys' School. In 1947, the Perth Boys' School became the Perth Boys' High School. During the 1950s, residential development in the inner city decreased as land values increased and the growth of the suburbs displaced inner city living.

=== 1959: Re-use ===
In 1959, the Perth Boys' High School closed and the Perth Technical College moved into the buildings. The building was known as the James Street Annexe. In the following years, a number of minor changes were made to the building, including electrical connections and installation of gas heating.

=== 1988: Heritage listing ===
The former Perth Boys and Girls School building was classified by the National Trust (WA) on 3 July 1978, and entered into the Register of the National Estate by the Australian Heritage Commission on 21 October 1980. It was permanently entered on to the State Register of Heritage Places on 24 March 2000.

=== 1988: Refurbishment and conversion ===
In July 1988, the successor of Perth Technical College, TAFE, vacated the building and it became the Perth Institute of Contemporary Arts (PICA). Plans to refurbish the building were drawn up by Donaldson and Warn. In 1991, the building was refurbished according to revised plans. On 8 November 1991 the building was officially opened as PICA. In 1992 Donaldson and Warn were awarded a commendation for their work on the PICA building by the Western Australian chapter of the Royal Australian Institute of Architects in the category of conservation/recycled buildings. In 1996, PICA used the building for a variety of purposes including: a cafe, performing space, gallery space and administration space.

== Built form ==
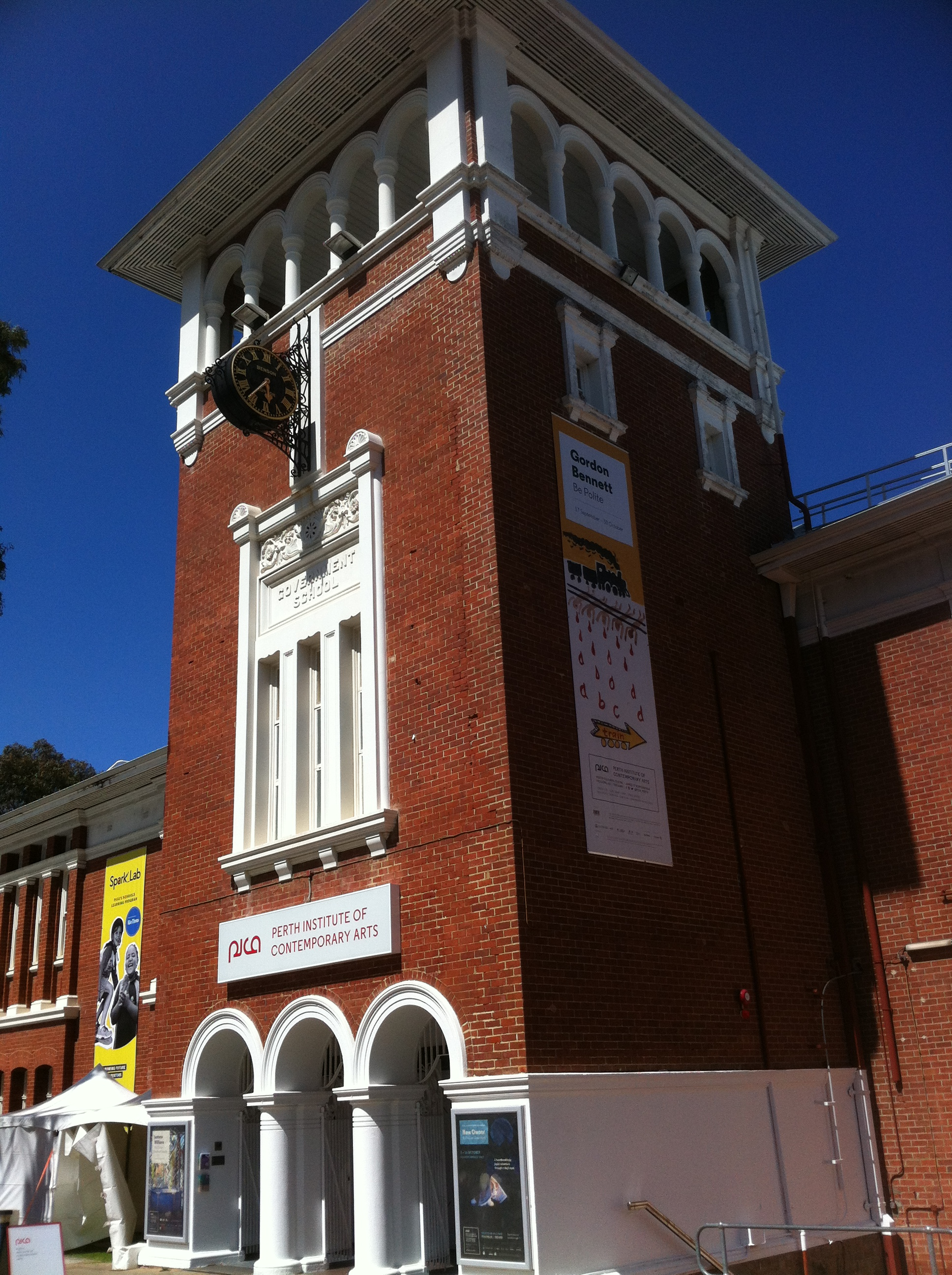
Projecting tower on the northern facade

The PICA building was designed in the Federation Free Classical style. The exterior features prominent decorative elements but, overall, displays a degree of restraint appropriate to a serious academic institution. The physical evidence confirms that main boys' and girls' entries were given particular emphasis in their level of detailing, but that the building was clearly designed to be seen in the round. The external walls are constructed of face brick in stretcher bond, with a random stone plinth below ground floor level. On the northern side of the building the stone plinth is below the present street level. The decorative detailing is focused along the eaves and around the entry porches and window openings. The building has a corrugated iron, hipped roof with a raised section over the central gallery space. There are wide eaves with timber slats to all sides. The corrugated iron roof has been reclad and no chimneys or roof vents are visible, but the majority of the downpipes and rainwater heads appear to be original. The building was originally designed with two principal entries, one for the Girls' School on the northern facade and one for the Boys' School on the western side. The Boys' School entry was designed as a projecting single-storey porch with a hipped corrugated iron roof, plain brick walls along the sides and a triple arched entry to the front. The Girls' School entry faced onto James Street and was housed at the base of the projecting tower. (This is now used as the main entry to PICA.)

The current interiors have a blend of original detailing with clearly contrasting modern adaptations and fixtures dating from the early 1990s conversion of the building to a contemporary arts centre. Some of the key features of the recent works include: the introduction of direct access to the ground floor of James Street; a large new reception area off this entry; a functional timber and steel stair within the reception area; large plain openings through former classroom walls; the creation of an open, ground floor performance space at the western end; the use of exposed steel trusses to support the gallery over the performance space; and the creation of a cafe within two former ground floor classrooms at the north-eastern corner of the building.

== PICA organisation ==
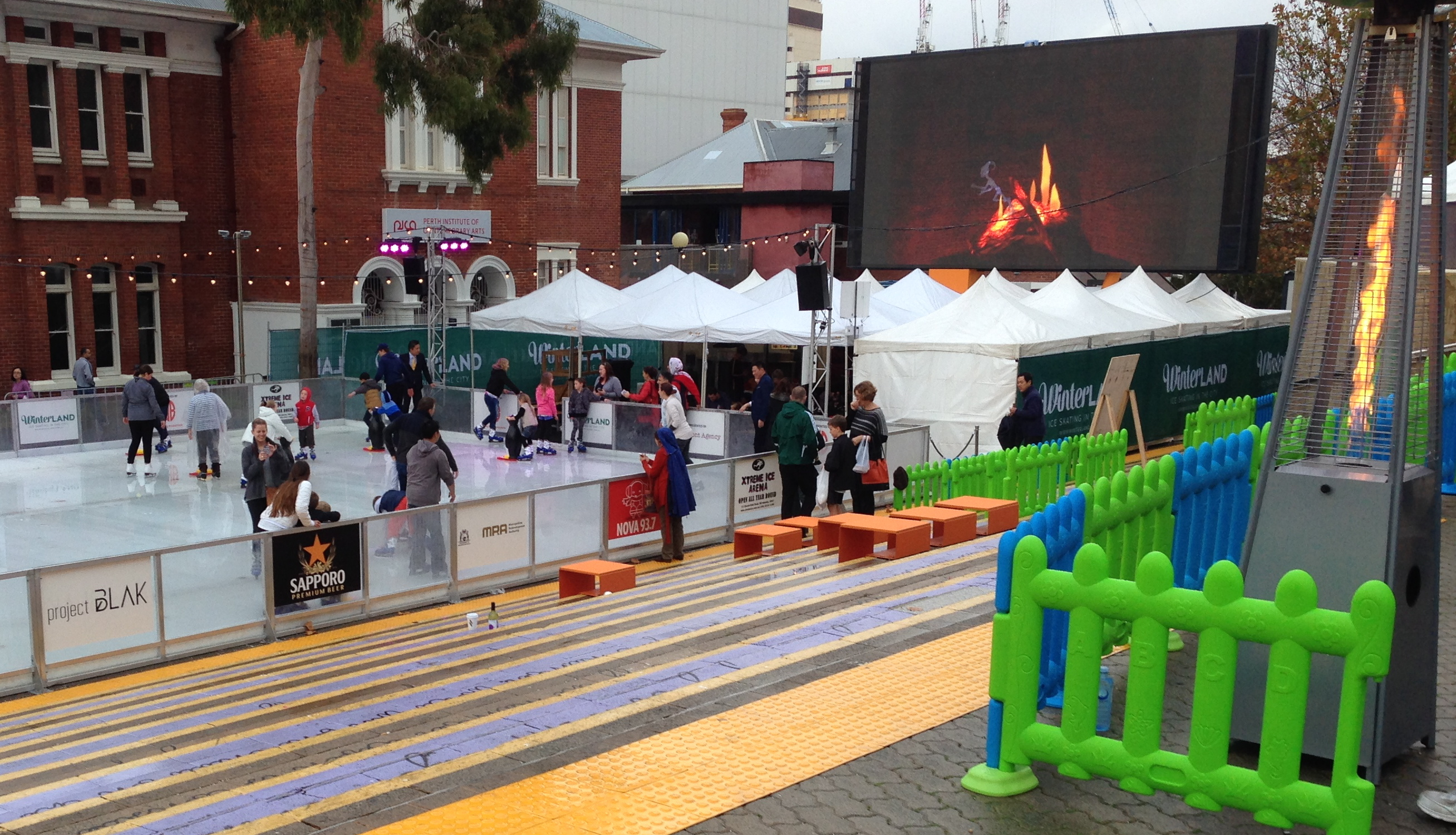
A school holiday event in front of PICA

The Perth Institute of Contemporary Arts (PICA) is housed in the building at 53 James Street. It began operating from the James Street building in 1988 with the main aim of promoting contemporary art (visual, performing or mixed) in Western Australia. PICA is a member of the advocacy organisation Contemporary Art Organisations Australia.

PICA operates a year-round program of exhibitions, performances, and screenings, and offers a public education program. Since 1992, its annual Hatched exhibition has showcased work from graduates across the country.

== See also ==
- Picabar, bar located adjacent to PICA
