= Ghost Care =

Australian indie rock band

- Origin: Perth, Western Australia, Australia
- Genres: Indie rock
- Years active: 2019-present
- Members: Beau Torrance; Luke Del Fante; Emma Joan
- Past members: Tanaya Harper

Ghost Care are an Australian indie rock band formed in Perth in 2019. The group consists of lead vocalist and guitarist Beau Torrance, drummer Luke Del Fante and bassist/vocalist Emma Joan. In 2019 they released their debut single Another. Since then, they have sold out multiple headline shows and shared the stage with the likes of The Vanns, Spacey Jane and Pacific Avenue. In 2022, they were nominated for BEST POP ACT in the WAM Awards.

== History ==
Ghost Care was founded by Beau Torrance and Luke Del Fante as a project in 2019. Their plan was to bring a new collaborator on for each new release. Their first guest was Tanaya Harper and the chemistry among the trio led to her becoming the third member of the group. Since the release of their debut single "Another" in 2019, the band has sold out multiple headline shows. In September 2022, they showcased at the annual music industry festival and conference BIGSOUND. In October 2022, they were nominated for Best Pop Act in the West Australian Music Industry Awards.

== Band members ==
Current members:

- Beau Torrance - lead vocalist and guitarist (2019–present)
- Luke Del Fante - drummer (2019–present)
- Emma Joan - bassist and vocalist (2025-present)

Past members:

- Tanaya Harper - bassist and vocalist (2019–2024)

== Discography ==
List of published singles, EPs and albums:

=== Singles ===
- "Another" (2019)
- "Home Run" (2019)
- "Outdoor Recreation Centre" (2020)
- "Midnight" (2020)
- "Oxygen" (2020)
- "IDKY" (2020)
- "Kevin Garnett" (2021)
- "Only Friend" (2021)
- "Bussell Hwy" (2022)
- "Part Time Living" (2022)
- "Partying" (2023)
- "Arcade" (2023)
- "Canadian Dream" (2024)
- "Don't I Know U" (2024)
- "Better Off" (2025)
- "LCD" (2025)
- "Waiting By The Phone" (2025)
- "So Long" (2026)

=== EPs ===
- Pedal to the Metal (2022)
- Oh Positive (2025)

=== Albums ===
- I'm So Sick of Being So Happy (2021)
