= Mojo's Bar =

Music venue and bar in North Fremantle, Western Australia

- Mojos
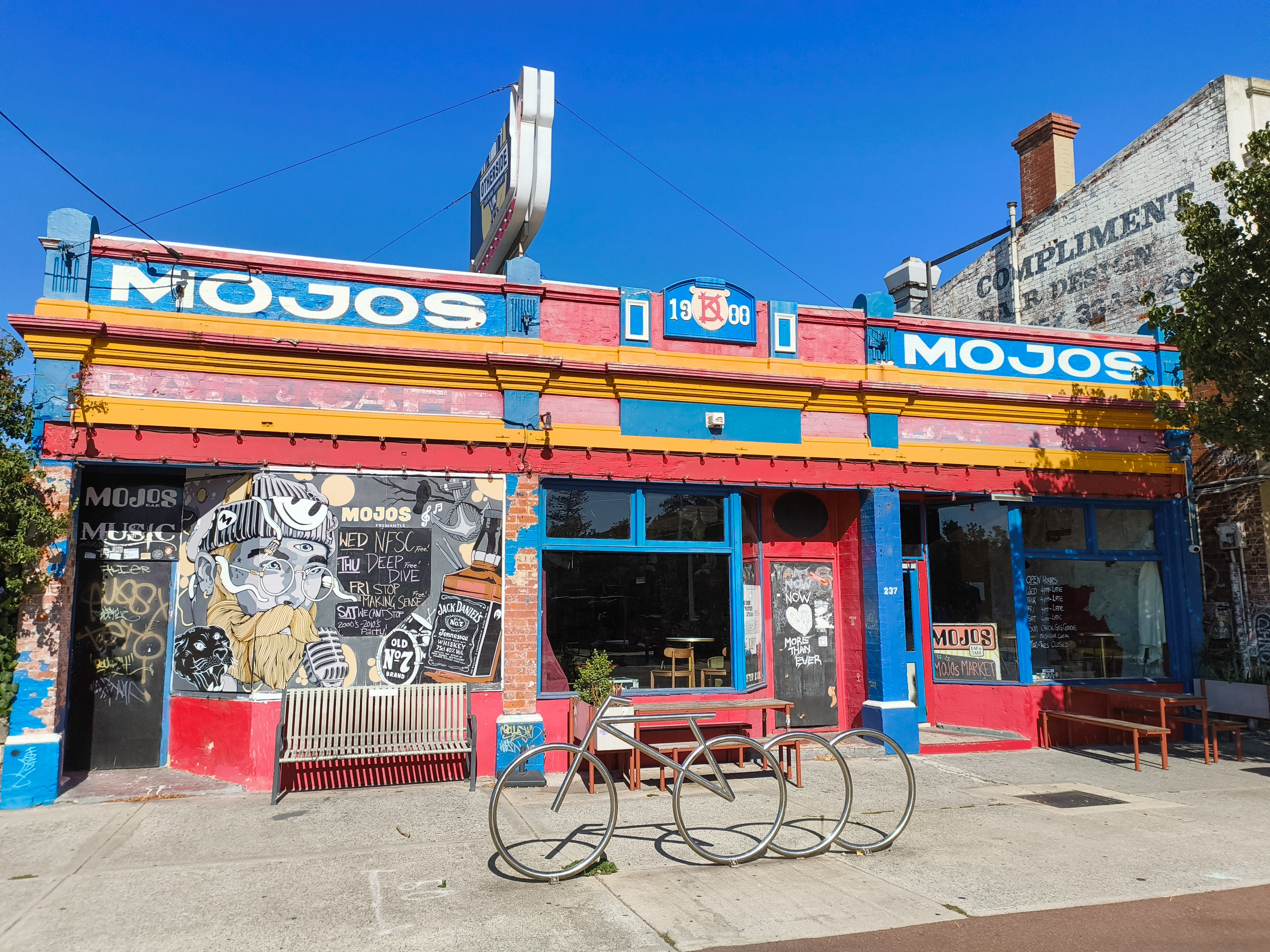
- Mojo's Bar in January 2025
- Interactive map of Mojo's Bar
- Former names: Stoned Crow
- Address: 237 Queen Victoria Street, North Fremantle; Fremantle; Australia
- Coordinates: 32°02′07″S 115°45′12″E
- Capacity: 190
- Type: Music venue, bar

Website
- www.mojosbar.com.au

Mojo's Bar, also known colloquially as Mojos, is a live music venue and bar in North Fremantle, Western Australia. It has been described as "a linchpin of Perth's live music scene", and is known as a venue where some notable musicians have performed before their careers launched.

== History ==
The venue was formerly known as the Stoned Crow and the first performances there took place in the 1970s. In 1998, the venue was purchased by Phil Stevens and his wife Anna Chiovitti. They renamed it Mojo's Bar and refurbished the interior, installing new staging and red velvet curtains.

The venue closed for three months in early 2020 due to the COVID-19 pandemic. 900 people donated over A$66,000 to help with running costs while it was closed.

In April 2021, there was public backlash against the behaviour of Mojo's Bar's co-owner and managing director Andrew Ryan. Multiple artists cancelled gigs at the venue as a result. The controversy led to Mojo's Bar's closure for a month and Ryan's departure from the company. In August 2021, Triple-1-Three acquired Ryan's majority stake in the venue.

In 2024, Michael Benson, Tony Papa-Adams and Paul Malone purchased the venue from Triple-1-Three. In October 2024, the venue was given a A$60,000 grant for acoustic upgrades from the federal government's Revive Live program. In November 2024, the venue began operating as a bar on Wednesday to Saturday afternoons. It also announced further changes and renovations to improve the long-term financial viability of the venue. These included installing a new roof over the beer garden, using the green room as a vinyl record store when it is not required by performers, and reactivating the kitchen. In June 2025, Mojo's Bar launched a crowdfunding campaign to raise A$16,000 to help fund the renovations.

== Notable acts ==
Some notable past acts to have performed at the venue include:

- Tame Impala,
- The Triffids,
- John Butler,
- Hard-Ons,
- Chris Cheney,
- Body Type,
- The Murlocs, and
- Amyl and the Sniffers.

== Awards ==
=== National Live Music Awards ===
The National Live Music Awards commenced in 2016 to recognise contributions to the live music industry in Australia.

Year	Nominee / work	Award	Result	Ref.
2023	Mojo's Bar	Best Venue in WA	Won	

== See also ==
- William Street Bird
- Ellington Jazz Club
