= William Street Bird =

Music venue in Northbridge, Western Australia

The William Street Bird
- Bird
- Interactive map of The William Street Bird
- Address: 181 William Street, Northbridge, WA, 6003; Perth; Australia
- Coordinates: 31°56′59″S 115°51′32″E
- Capacity: ~150
- Type: Music venue

Construction
- Opened: 2010; 16 years ago

Website
- www.williamstreetbird.com

The William Street Bird, known colloquially as the Bird, is a live music bar located in the Northbridge suburb of Perth, Western Australia. It opened in 2010.

== Description ==
Local band Myriad Sun in August 2021

The Bird plays host to local musicians, with some known performers having gone on to successful international careers. Notable artists to have performed at the venue include Flume, Stella Donnelly, Spacey Jane, Tame Impala, (Note: In 2013, the members of Tame Impala performed a 'secret gig' at the venue spread through word of mouth. The purpose of the gig was to fundraise for a friend that had a car stolen. The name of the band for the night was advertised publicly as 'Kevin Spacey'.) Gum, and Methyl Ethel.

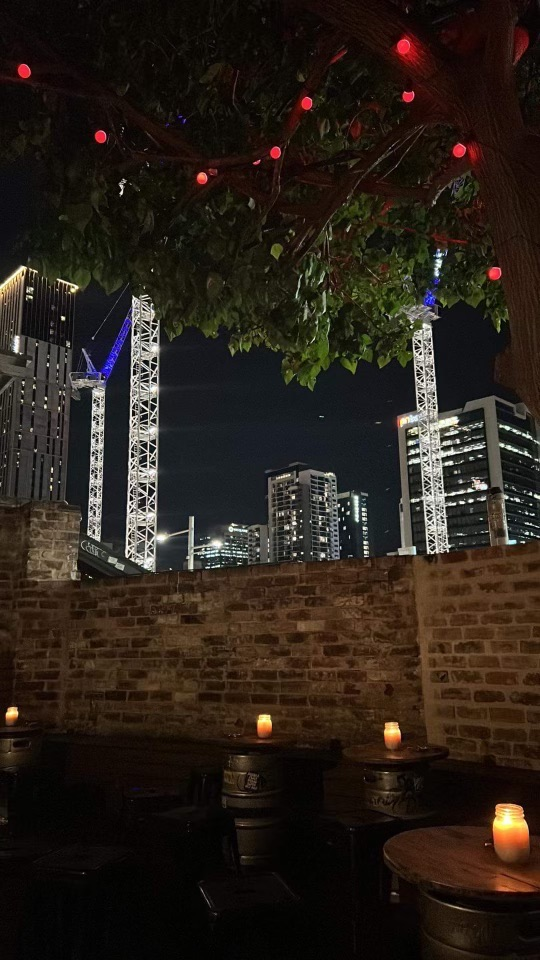
Courtyard

The inside of the venue resembles a large jam room for a resident band. The interior design is simple, with large amounts of exposed brick. The back of the venue is an open-air courtyard.

== History and operations ==
The live music bar was opened by mechanical engineer and entrepreneur Mike O'Hanlon in 2010. During the same year, the venue was involved in a campaign against a decision by the Liquor Commission to put its late-night trading application up for review. This decision was publicly opposed at the time by Perth's lord mayor Lisa Scaffidi, and the West Australian Music Association. The restriction would have imposed a 10 pm closing time upon the bar, which O'Hanlon criticised as unworkable. The decision to put the license up for review was made despite approval by the Perth city council for a midnight license earlier that month. (Note: Political reasons for imposing an earlier closing time related to a crack-down announced in 2009 in response to Northbridge-related violence.)

In 2016 the venue was purchased by O'Hanlon's friend Kabir Ramasary, a former financial planner who also owns multiple nearby venues.

The venue has periodically hosted fundraising events for RTRFM, a community radio station based in the city.

== Reception ==
In her 2016 live music review for the Perth outlet Isolated Nation, contributor and local musician Tanaya Harper praised the "Wednesday nights at the Bird" weekly local music event, saying:

this has to be one of the best live music congregations in Perth. Weekly line-ups consistently showcase the best of what Perth has to offer [...].

According to the University of Western Australia's student magazine Pelican, the venue is known locally for its "artsy, chilled out atmosphere".

The venue has been compared by PerthNow to the Ellington Jazz Club "for people who are too young to know who Quincy Jones is".

== See also ==
- Mojo's Bar
- Rosemount Hotel
