= Russian tea cake =

Pastry eaten around Christmas in the US

Russian tea cakes
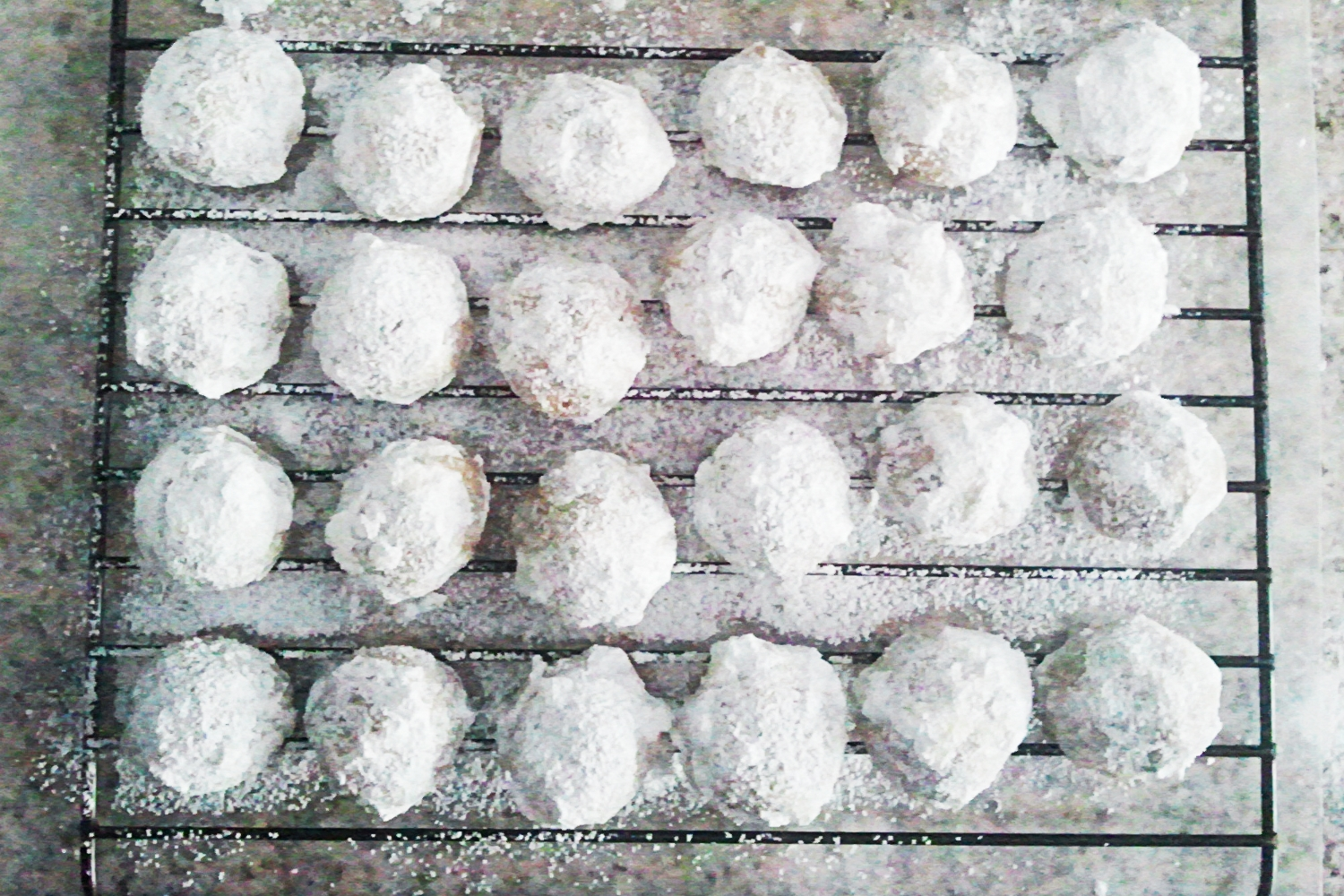
- Russian tea cakes coated in confectioner's sugar
- Type: Pastry
- Course: Dessert
- Serving temperature: Hot or cold
- Main ingredients: nuts, butter, powdered sugar

A Russian tea cake, Mexican wedding cake, Mexican wedding cookie, snowball cookie or butterball is a kind of pastry, often eaten around Christmas time in the United States.

== Ingredients ==
Russian tea cakes have a relatively simple recipe, generally consisting entirely of flour, water, butter, and ground nuts, the nut variety depending upon the cookie type. After baking, they are rolled in powdered sugar while still hot, then coated again once the cookie has cooled.

European recipes rely upon coarsely chopped hazelnuts, almonds, or walnuts. Mexican wedding cookies, also known as "Polvorones", are rich, buttery, nutty cookies with a crumbly texture that melt in your mouth. While they share similar ingredients with Russian tea cakes, they traditionally use coarsely chopped pecans or almonds. A hint of cinnamon is often added, providing a subtle warmth and enhancing their rich, nutty flavor.

== History ==
A reason for the common name Russian tea cake or any connection to Russian cuisine is unknown. However, culinary historians trace the direct ancestor of these cookies to the Middle East, specifically to the qurabiya (or ghraybeh), a shortbread originating in medieval Arab cuisine. First documented in 10th-century Arabic cookbooks, these early confectioneries established the defining ratio of fat, flour, and sugar, utilizing ground almonds—a technique that became the foundation for European nut-based cookies.

The original Middle Eastern recipes relied on clarified butter and were traditionally scented with rose water or orange blossom water. As global trade routes expanded during the Middle Ages, this foundational recipe migrated into Eastern and Southern Europe, where it was adapted into regional variations such as the Russian tea cake, the Greek kourabiedes, and the Viennese crescent.

The transmission of this recipe to the Americas is deeply rooted in the Moorish occupation of the Iberian Peninsula (711–1492), during which Middle Eastern baking techniques were introduced to Spain. These Moorish culinary traditions evolved into the Spanish polvorón, which Spanish colonizers and European nuns subsequently brought to Mexico in the 16th century, eventually substituting local pecans for the traditional Old World almonds.

By the 20th century, these cookies became a staple of wedding, Christmas, and Easter traditions in the U.S., where they are best known today as Russian tea cakes or Mexican wedding cookies.

== See also ==
- List of American desserts
- List of Russian desserts
- Bizcochito, a butter cookie originating in northern Mexico
- Polvorón, a similar shortbread originating in Spain
