= Areias, São Paulo =

Municipality in the state of São Paulo, Brazil

Areias
- Municipality
- Municipality of Areias
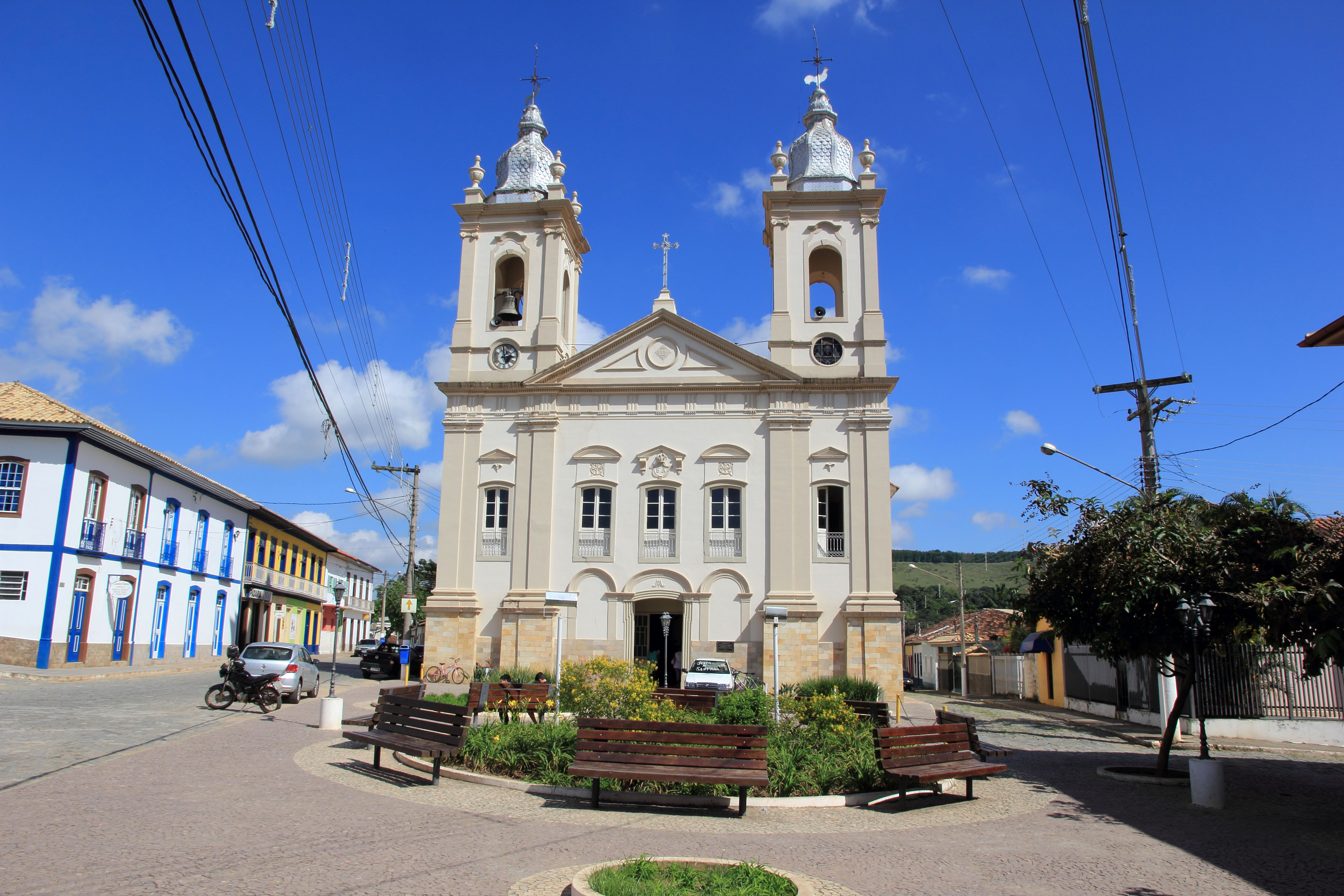
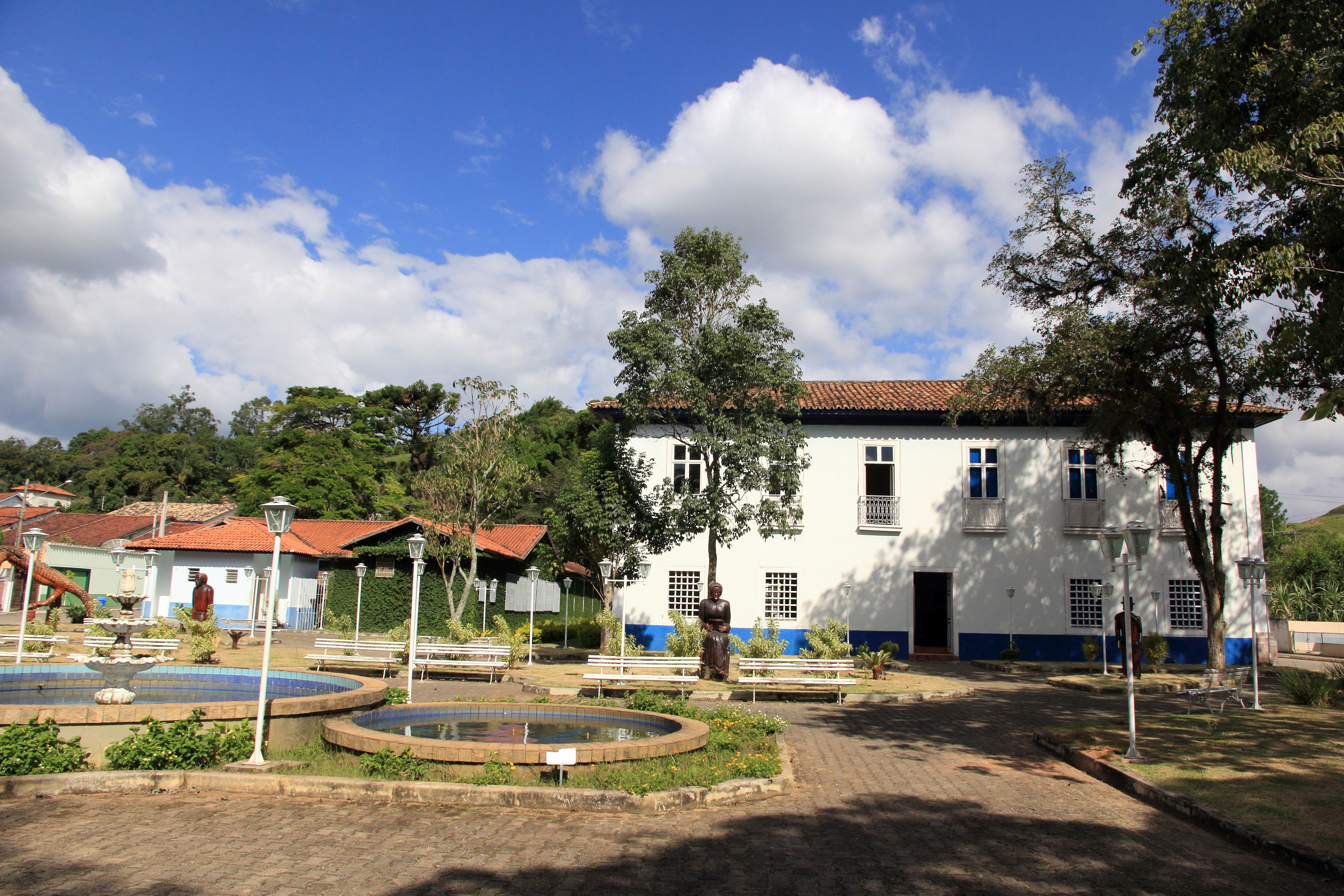
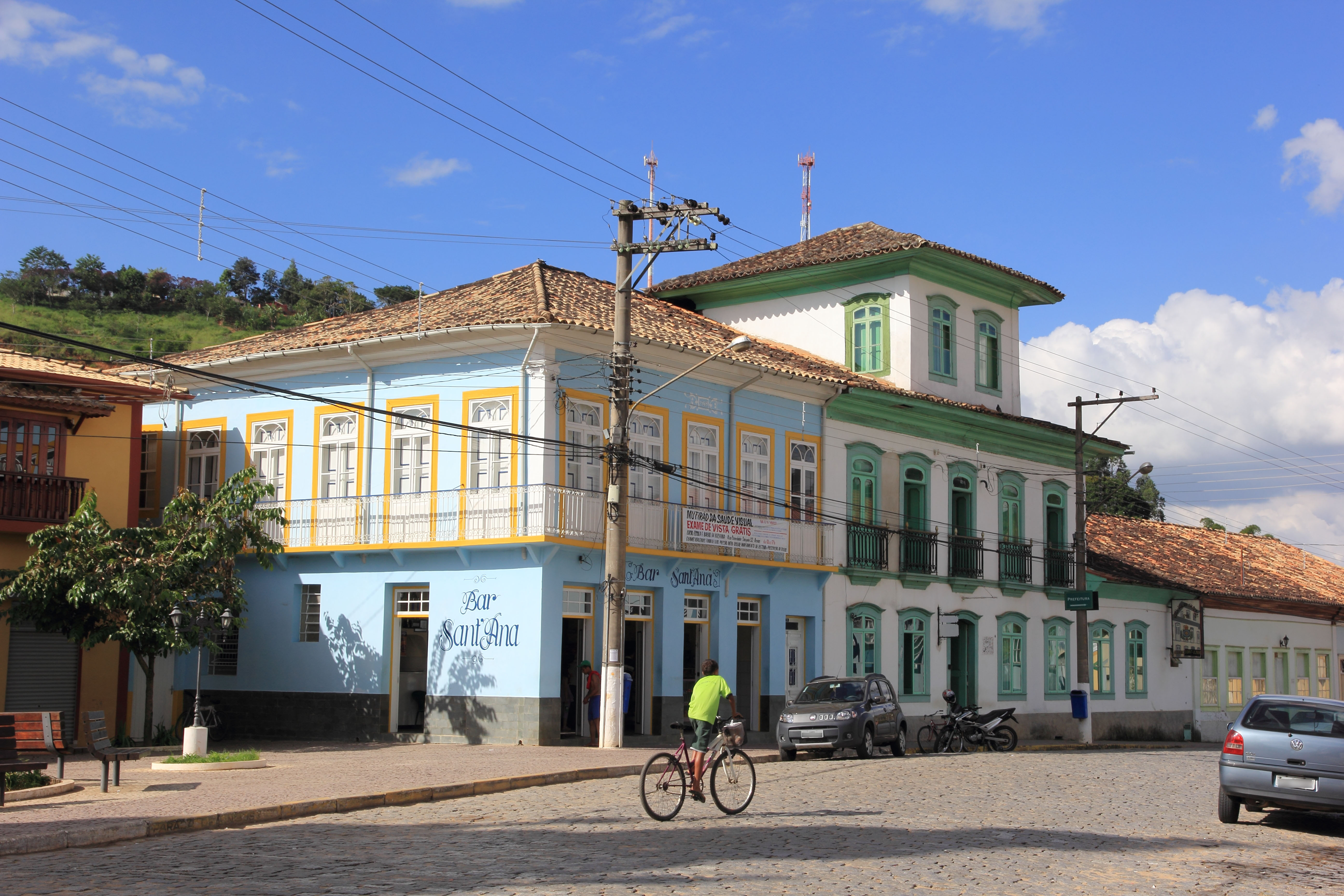
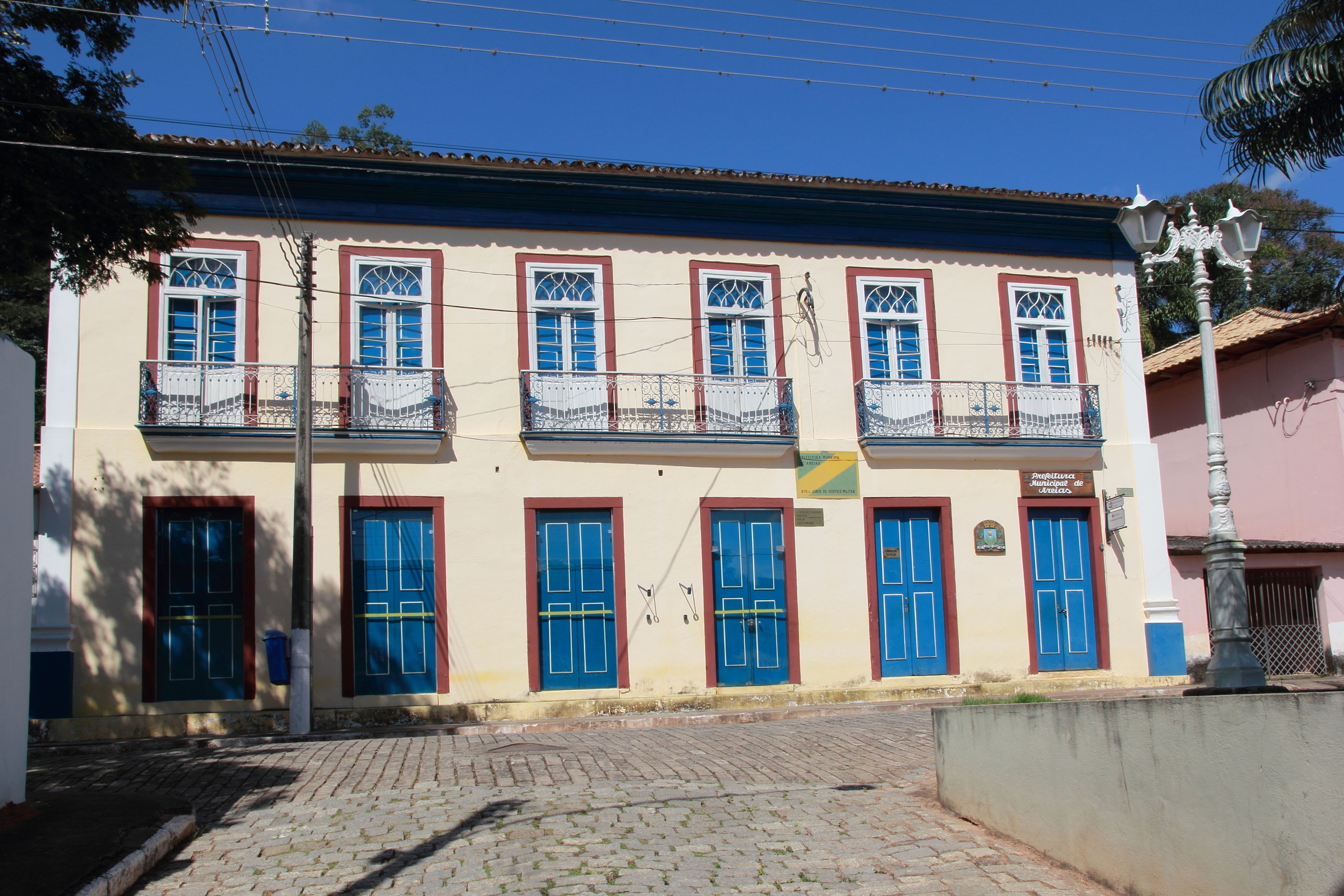
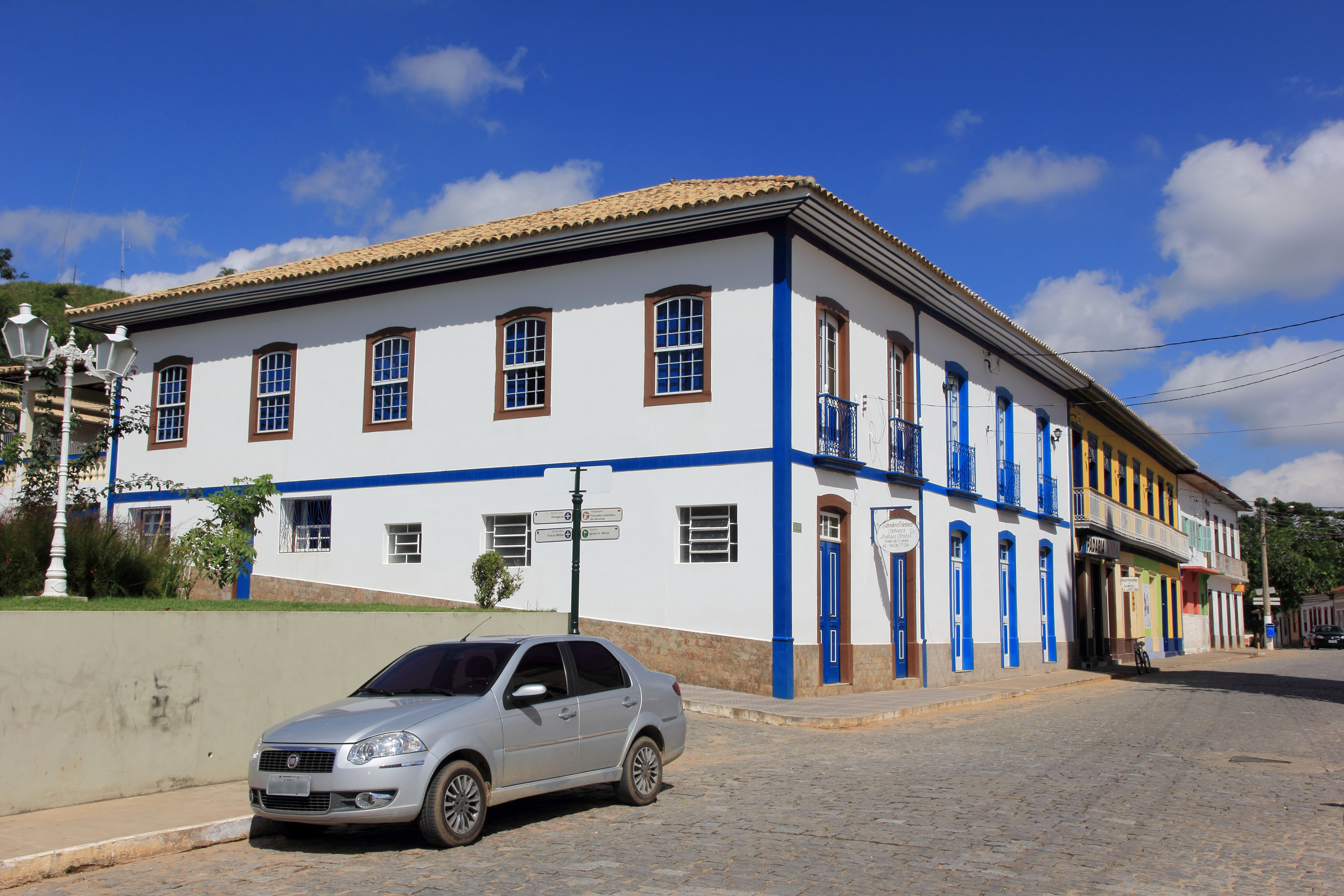
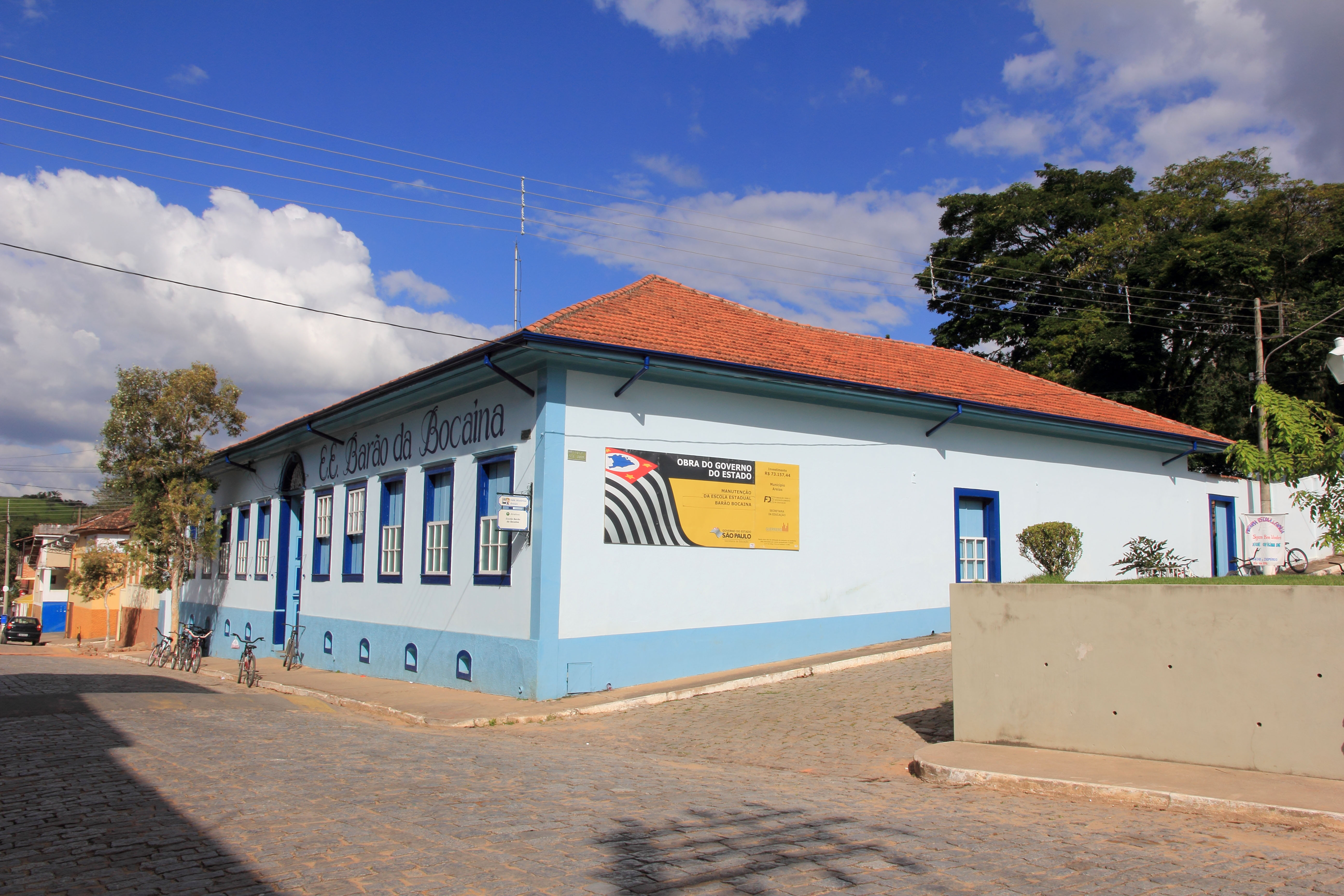

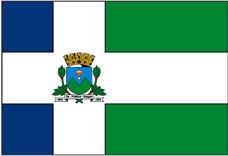
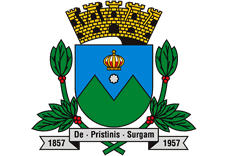
- Flag Coat of arms

- Location in São Paulo
- Coordinates: 22°34′48″S 44°41′50″W
- Country: Brazil
- Region: Southeast
- State: São Paulo

Government
  - Mayor: Paulo Henrique de Souza Coutinho (MDB)

Area
  - Total: 305.23 km^{2} (117.85 sq mi)
- Elevation: 509 m (1,670 ft)

Population (2020)
  - Total: 3,896
  - Density: 12.76/km^{2} (33.06/sq mi)
- Time zone: UTC−3:30 (BRT)
- Area code: +55 12
- HDI (2010): 0.697 – medium
- Website: areias.sp.gov.br

Areias is a municipality in the state of São Paulo in Brazil. It is part of the Metropolitan Region of Vale do Paraíba e Litoral Norte. The population is 3,896 (2020 est.) in an area of 305.23 km^{2}. The elevation is 509 m.

The municipality contains part of the 292,000-hectare (720,000-acre) Mananciais do Rio Paraíba do Sul Environmental Protection Area, created in 1982 to protect the sources of the Paraíba do Sul river.

== Demographics ==
Historical population (municipality)
Year	Population	%±
1920	6,100
1940	5,168	−15.3%
1950	3,558	−31.2%
1960	3,880	9.1%
1970	4,107	5.9%
1980	3,706	−9.8%
1991	3,284	−11.4%
2000	3,600	9.6%
2010	3,696	2.7%
2022	3,577	−3.2%

Obs: According to the 2000 IBGE Census, the population was 3,600, of which 2,452 were urban and 1,148 are rural. The average life expectancy for the municipality was 65.57 years. The literacy rate was at 84.97%.

== Media ==
In telecommunications, the city was served by Companhia Telefônica Brasileira until 1973, when it began to be served by Telecomunicações de São Paulo. In July 1998, this company was acquired by Telefónica, which adopted the Vivo brand in 2012.

The company is currently an operator of cell phones, fixed lines, internet (fiber optics/4G) and television (satellite and cable).

== See also ==
- List of municipalities in São Paulo
