= West Australian Youth Jazz Orchestra =

Youth jazz orchestra in Perth, Western Australia

- Genres: Jazz
- Years active: 1983–present
- Members: 54
- Website: wayjo.com

The West Australian Youth Jazz Orchestra (WAYJO) is an Australian youth jazz orchestra based in Perth, Western Australia. In 2026 the artistic director was Gemma Farrell, who was also musical director for their Resonance Jazz Orchestra.

== Featured Composers ==
- Ed Partyka

== See also ==
- List of youth orchestras
