= Graham Wood (musician) =

- Born: 15 September 1971; Perth, Western Australia
- Died: 19 July 2017 (aged 45)
- Genres: Jazz
- Occupations: Musician, educator
- Instrument: Piano

Graham Wood (15 September 1971 – 19 July 2017) was an Australian jazz pianist and educator.

== Career ==
Wood taught jazz piano at the Western Australian Academy of Performing Arts in Perth, Western Australia, in 2001, became head of the jazz department in 2005, and Program Director of Music in 2006.

He received a 2002 commission from the Fremantle International Jazz Festival to compose a one-hour work entitled "Joan".

In 2009, he opened the Ellington Jazz Club in Perth. In its first year, the venue put on 520 shows and featured 2,586 musicians.

Wood was a PhD candidate at the University of Western Australia School of Music and completed his thesis in 2010 entitled "Factors affecting the performance wellness of jazz pianists in practice and performance". He presented two papers at the Performing Arts Medicine Association annual conference in Aspen, Colorado.

In 2013, Wood founded the Perth International Jazz Festival.

Wood discovered he had cholangiocarcinoma, a rare form of bile duct cancer, in 2013. He underwent an operation the same year, which successfully removed the cancer from his bile ducts.

Wood died on 19 July 2017, at the age of 45.

== Awards ==
=== West Australian Music Industry Awards ===
The West Australian Music Industry Awards are annual awards celebrating achievements for Western Australian music. They commenced in 1985.

Year	Nominee / work	Award	Result
2010	The Graham Wood Trio	Best Jazz Act	Won
2017	Graham Wood	Hall of Fame	inductee

== Other sources ==
- Collins, Simon. The West Australian, Perth, 21 May 2010.
- Banks, Ron. "The West Australian", Perth, 17 March 2009.
- Peterson, Sandra. "The Sunday Times Home Magazine", Perth, 30 May 2010.
- Gordon, Bob. "X-Press Magazine", Perth, 4 March 2010
- Appleby, Rosalind. "The West Australian", Perth, 9 August 2009
- John, Richard. "The Australian", Sydney, 29 January 2002
- Spencer, Doug. "Radio National, The Weekend Planet"
- Blue, Eliza. "ABC News, Stateline Western Australian"
