= Picabar =

Bar in Perth, Western Australia

Pica Bar and Cafe
- PICA

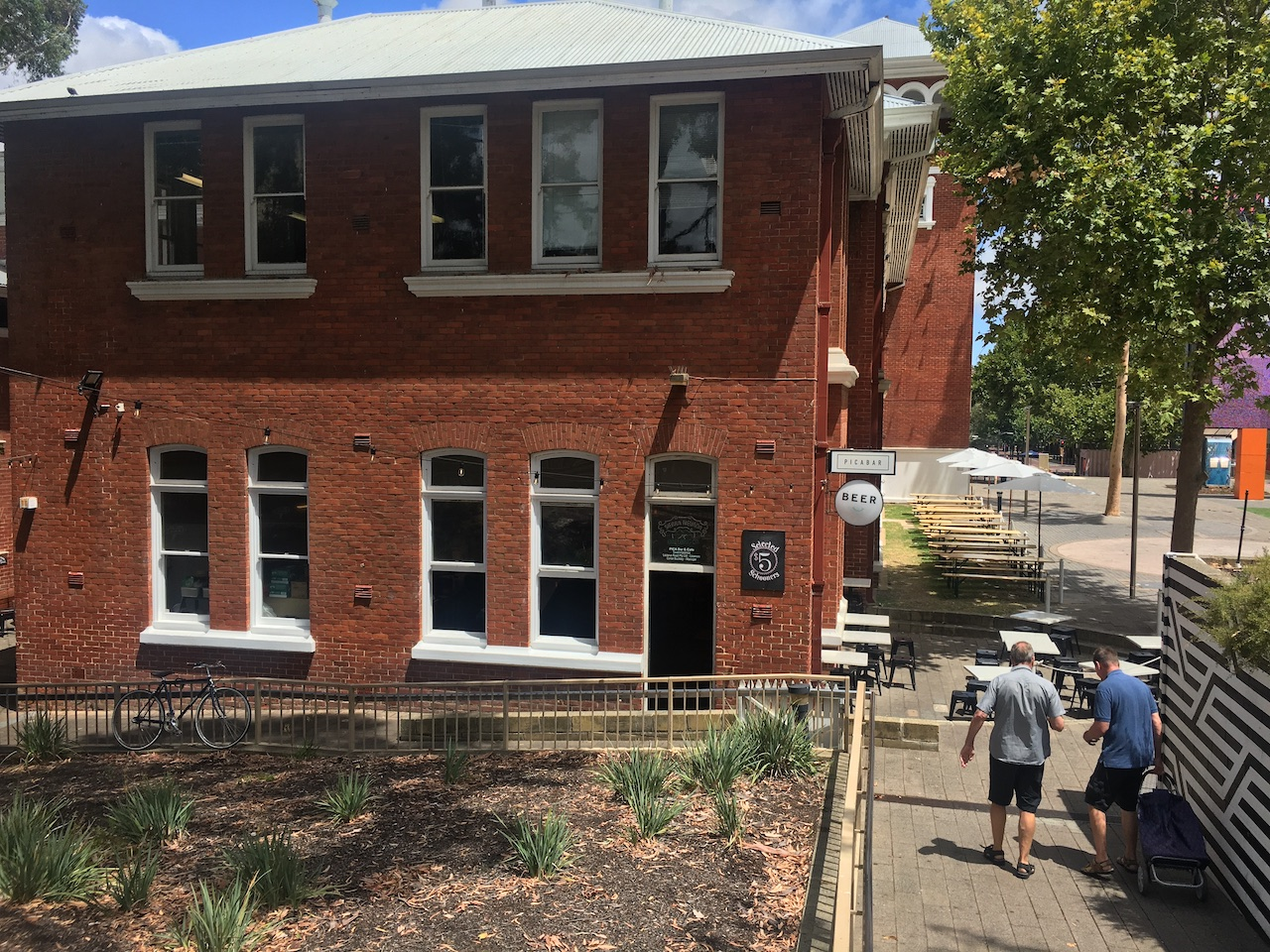
- Entry from Cultural Centre walkway
- Interactive map of Pica Bar and Cafe
- Address: 51 James Street; Perth; Australia
- Coordinates: 31°56′59″S 115°51′38″E
- Type: Bar, music venue

Construction
- Opened: 2012; 14 years ago

Website
- www.picabar.com.au

Picabar is a bar and music venue located in Perth, Western Australia, within the Perth Cultural Centre. It is situated adjacent to the Perth Institute of Contemporary Arts (PICA) for which the bar is named.

== Description ==
The venue features an outdoor courtyard with access from the Perth Cultural Centre, near the steps and plaza, as well as outdoor tables along the edge of the cultural centre.

It operates within the old Perth Boys School building, part of the Perth Central School complex in the early 1900s.

As of November 2018, it employs 15 staff.

== History and operations ==
Picabar is the family business of brothers Brian and Conor Buckley, and Brian's wife Melissa Bowen. It opened in 2012 in a space that was unused and had been boarded up for 12 years. The bar owners subleased the space from PICA with a six-month lease, and an option for a longer, ten-year term subject to PICA's lease from the state government being renewed.

PICA's lease was not renewed, and both PICA and Picabar then ended up operating on month-to-month leases. Picabar's owners later stated that they were given assurances there would eventually be a long-term arrangement, a claim denied by the Department of Local Government, Sport and Cultural Industries' director general Duncan Ord.

=== Lease renewal dispute ===
In October 2018, ownership of the precinct was transferred from the government to the Perth Theatre Trust (PTT), which terminated PICA's lease, and hence Picabar's sub-lease, with three weeks notice. PICA was to be given a new sublease from the PTT, excluding the bar area, which was to be opened up to an expression of interest process. By early November, the government gave Picabar a temporary reprieve until March 2019, and Culture and Arts minister David Templeman intervened to ensure Picabar's owners would be given the first preference in negotiations.

Public outrage led to a campaign to retain Picabar, culminating in a "Save Picabar" petition on Change.org that attracted 11,000 signatures, including direct competitors and other members of the state's hospitality industry. On 15 October 2019, a new five-year lease was signed, with an option for an extension. The lease requires renovations to be undertaken, with allowance for additional alfresco space. The incident, and the "people power" that saved Picabar, received national media coverage.

The venue was substantially renovated in 2020.

== Reception ==
The bar features prominently in Perth youth culture as a hangout and social fixture. It has a particular association with hipster culture, being described by The West Australian as "somewhere between a dive bar and a hipster hangout". The bar is a regular topic of local internet culture, with the Instagram meme page 'meet_me_at_pica' regularly posting memes about the venue and associated youth culture.

== Gallery ==
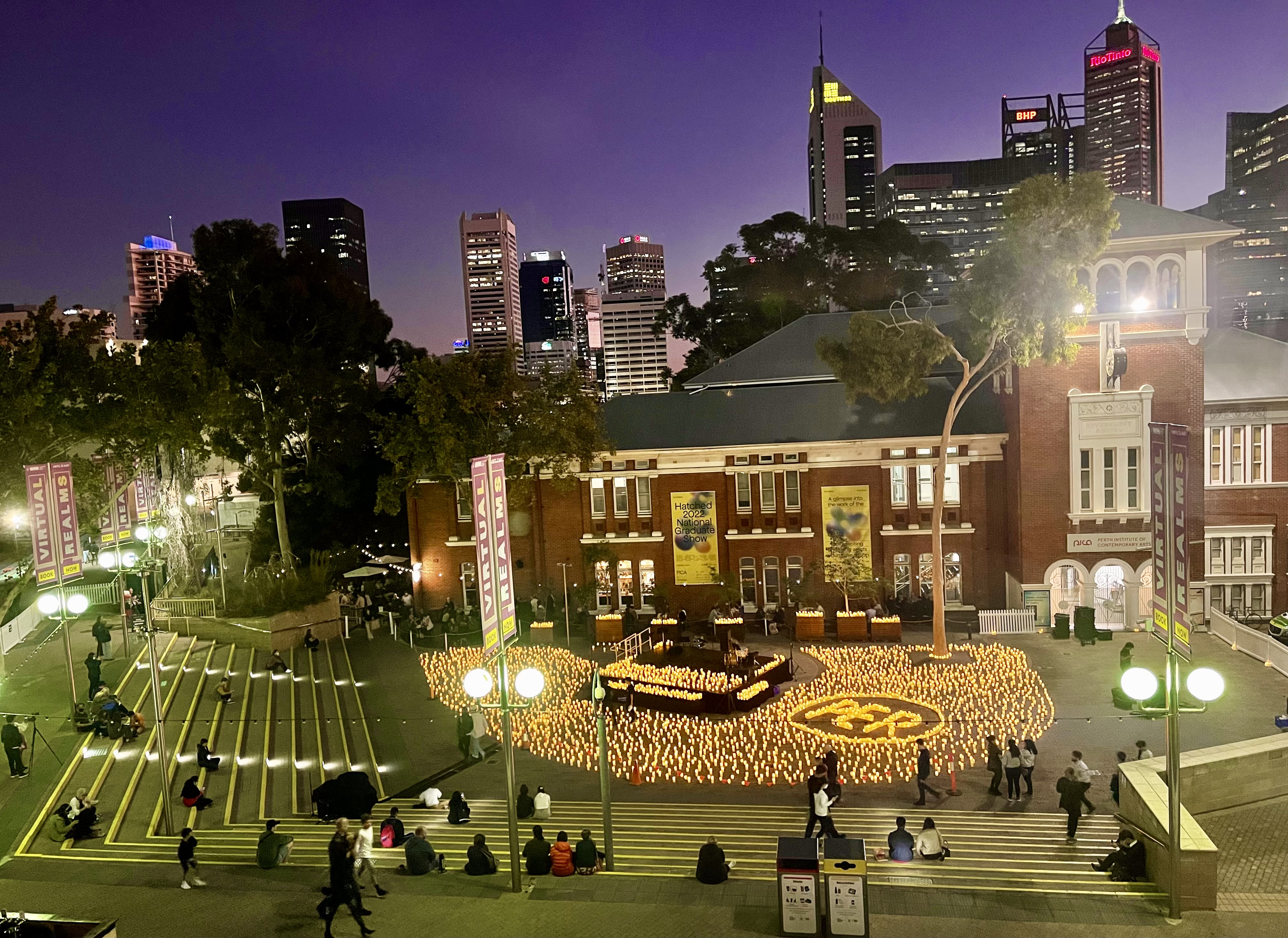

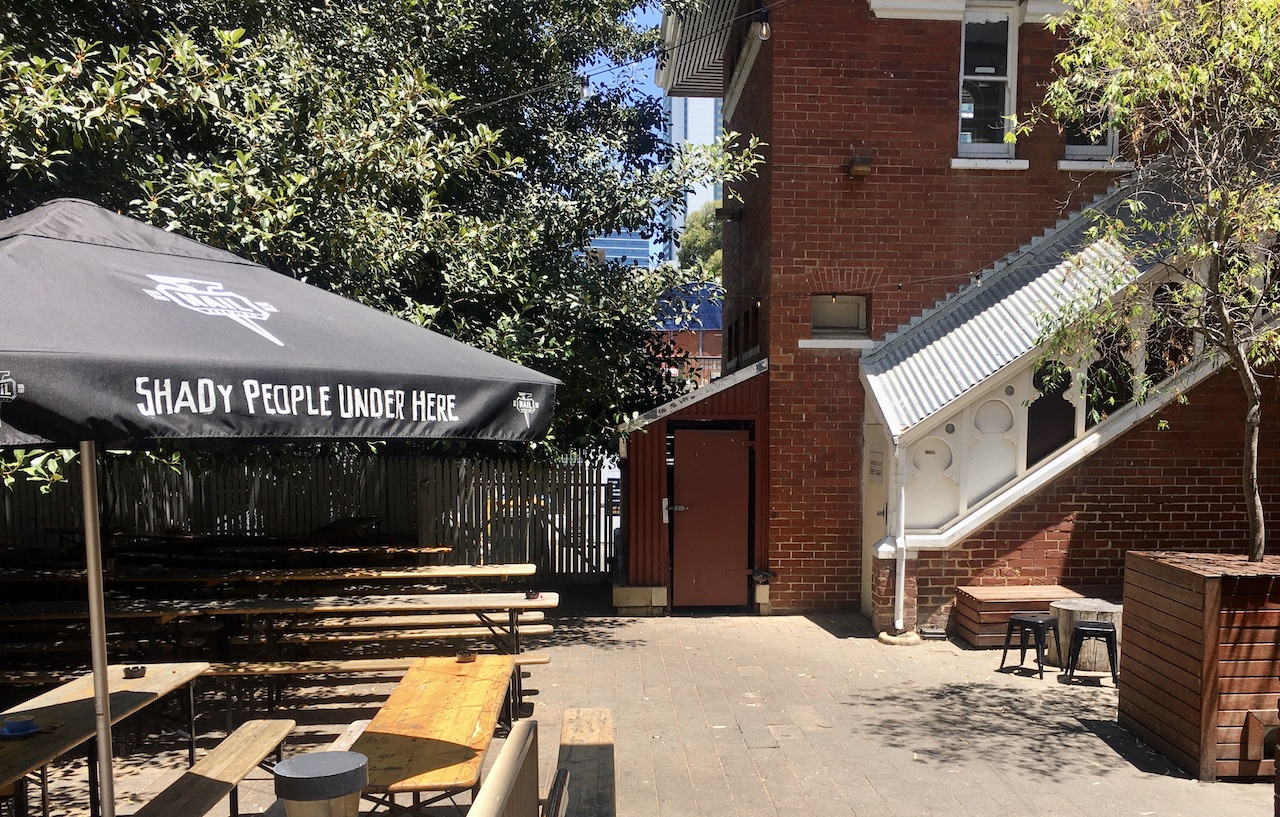

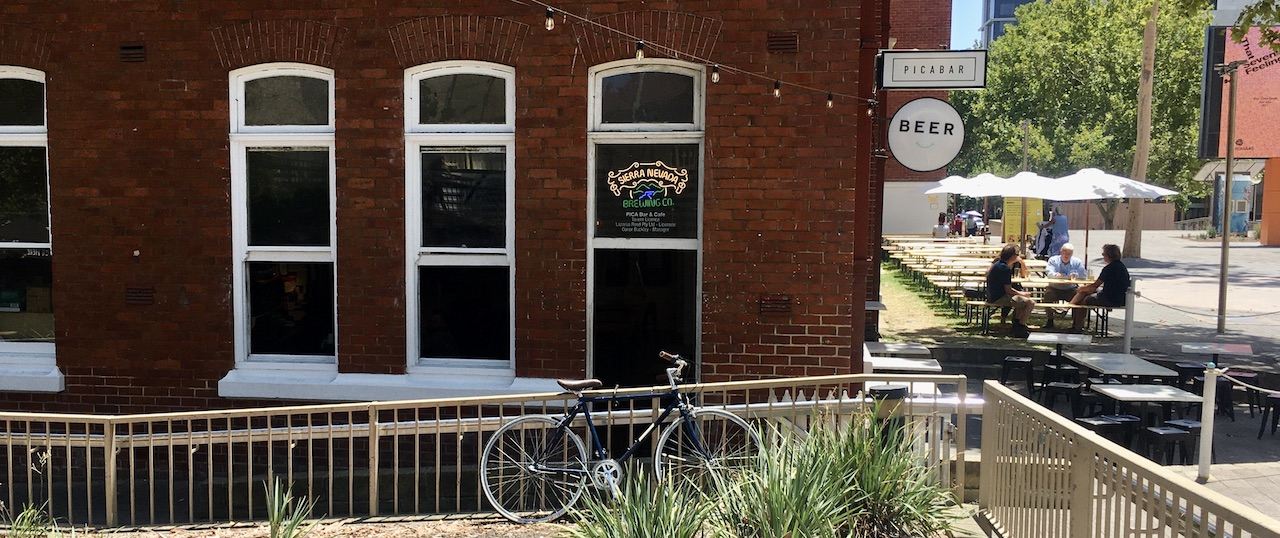
