= Nine Japanese Bistro =

Restaurant in Perth, Western Australia

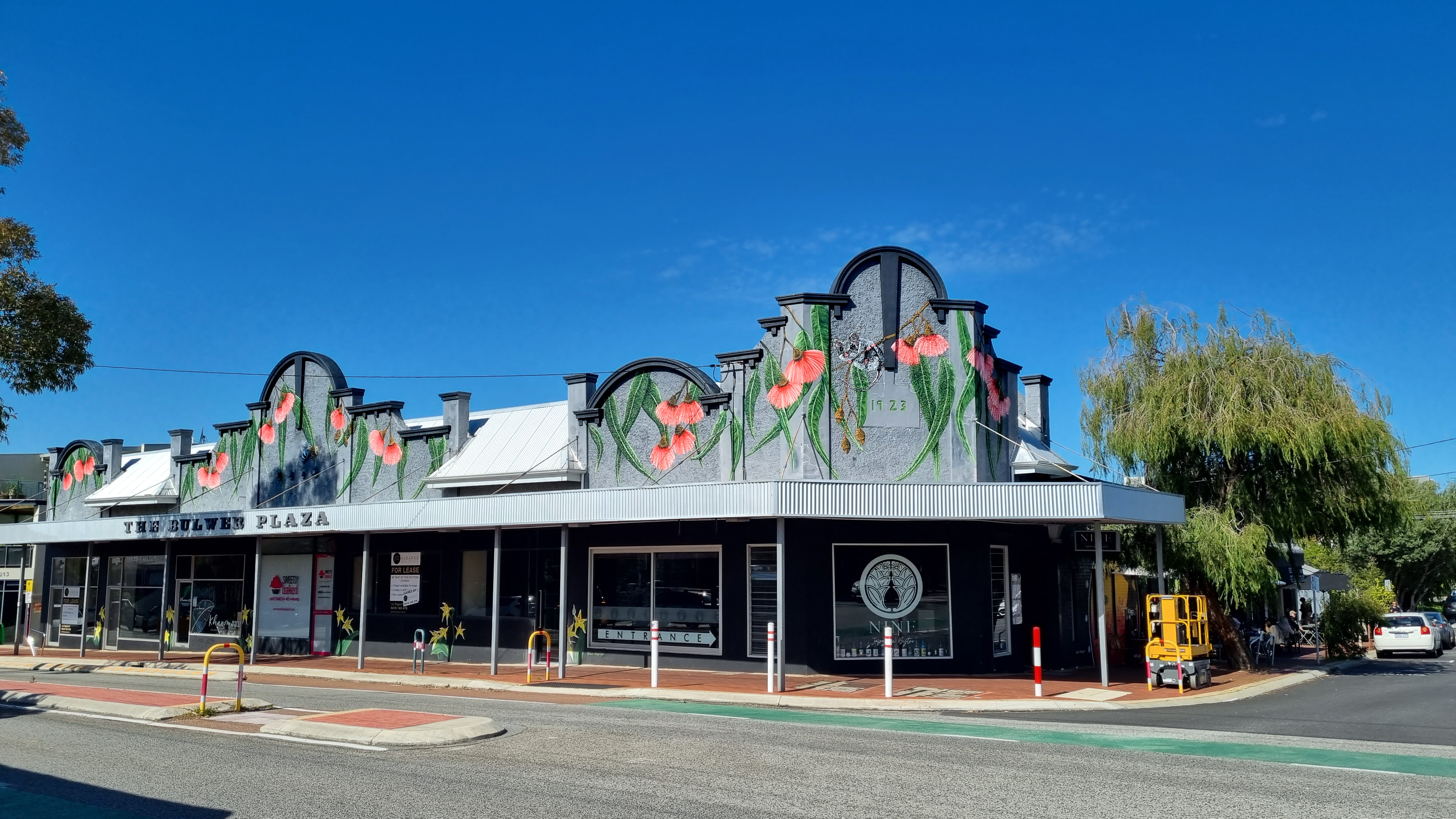
- Interactive map of Nine Japanese Bistro

Restaurant information
- Established: 2003; 23 years ago
- Owner: Muneki Song
- Chef: Muneki Song
- Food type: Japanese
- Location: 227-229 Bulwer Street, Perth, Perth, Western Australia, 6000, Australia
- Coordinates: 31°56′25″S 115°51′42″E
- Website: ninejapanesebistro.com.au

Nine Japanese Bistro (formerly Nine Fine Food) is a Japanese-fusion restaurant in the suburb of Perth, Western Australia. It is situated in Perth's inner city on the corner of Lake and Bulwer streets. The restaurant was opened in 2003 by its chef, Muneki Song.

== Description ==
The walls of the venue are adorned with stacked stone, and Japanese paper lamps are stacked along shelves. The venue has been described as 'leaning far more to the West than East'. Dishes offered include pork belly with mango chili sauce, confit of duck leg with potato mash, and lamb backstraps with soy dressing. The venue also serves chirashi plates. Reviewers have criticised the restaurant for its limited drinks menu.

== Reception ==
In her review for PerthNow, Gail Williams praised the toothfish. The kinoco caviar pasta was described by her as an 'absolute standout'. She criticised the barrimundi as 'slightly mushy', and the plum miso as 'a tad too sweet'.

In his review for The West Australian, Simon Collins praised the caviar pasta. The braised lamb shoulder, and the duck and scallop dish which 'spent a little too long on the grill' were both described as 'slight disappointments'. However, he said that the dessert partly made up for the experience, praising the cheesecake and matcha green tea gelato. Collins scored it 14/20, writing:

there is a good reason that Song's modern Japanese eatery will chalk up 20 years in November – a remarkable achievement for any restaurant, let alone one putting some odd twists and turns on a cuisine that often celebrates authenticity.
