= Ellington Jazz Club =

Jazz club in Perth, Western Australia

- Ellington

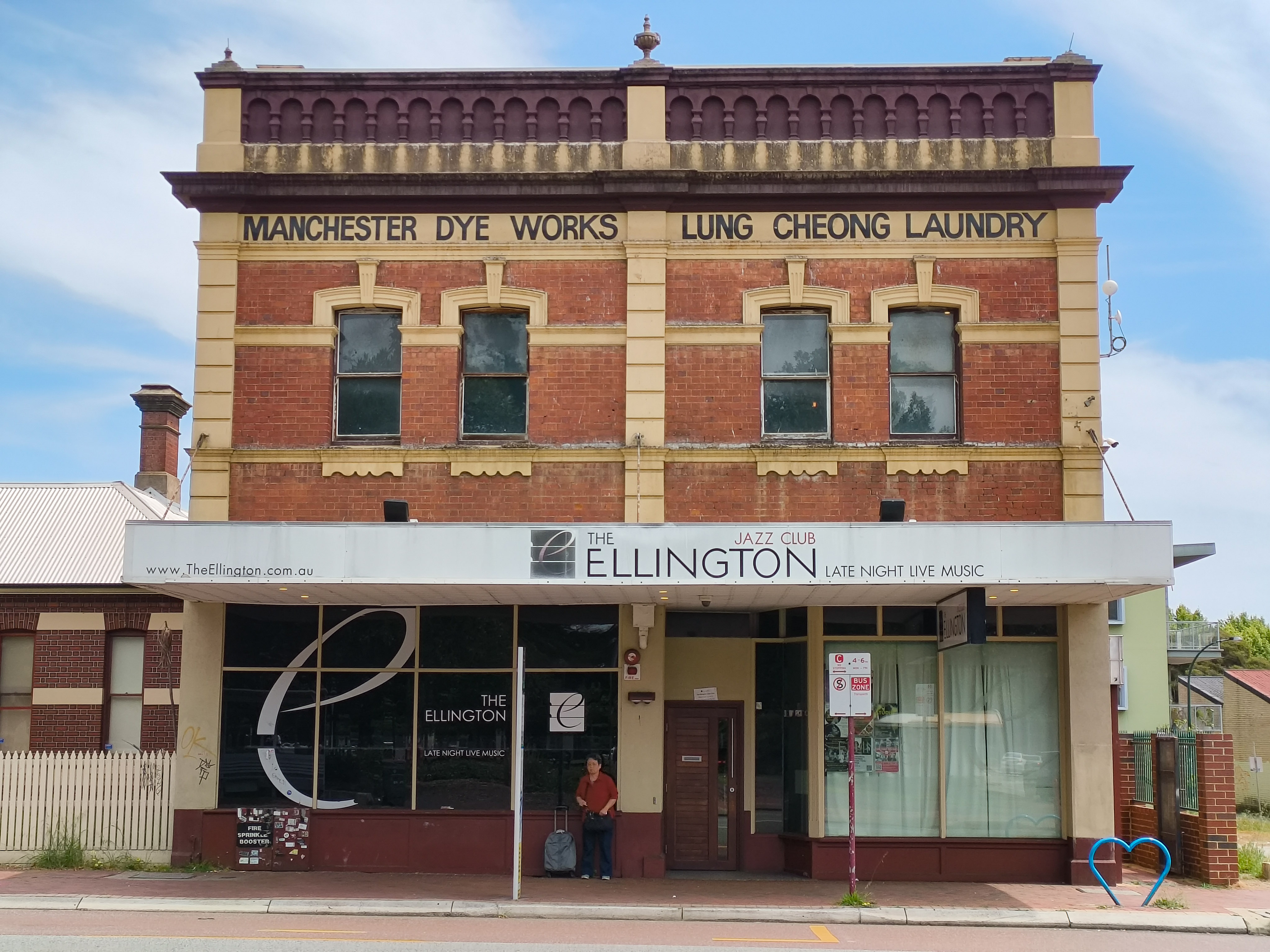
- Interactive map of Ellington Jazz Club
- Full name: The Ellington Jazz Club
- Address: 191–193 Beaufort Street; Perth; Australia
- Coordinates: 31°56′48″S 115°51′51″E
- Type: Jazz club

Construction
- Opened: 2009; 17 years ago

Website
- www.ellingtonjazz.com.au

The Ellington Jazz Club, known colloquially as the Ellington, is a music venue located in Perth, Western Australia. It has been described as one of the country's "best loved and most highly regarded jazz clubs".

The venue plays host to local jazz musicians, including students of Western Australian Academy of Performing Arts. It has also been a venue for the Perth International Jazz Festival, and Perth's Fringe World festival.

== History ==
The venue was founded by Graham Wood and Bernard Kong in 2009. Wood had been frustrated by the lack of suitable performance venues in Perth, after he had been a professional musician for 20 years. The venue was converted from a disused dye works building. The interior of the venue is described as resembling New York City jazz clubs.

In 2014 the Rolling Stones' drummer Charlie Watts played a surprise performance at the venue, after the cancellation of the band's planned concert due to the death of Mick Jagger's partner. Then-student Harry Mitchell was invited for perform alongside him. The impromptu performance made Perth headlines.

In October 2022 the venue was put up for sale. It was purchased in 2023 by the couple Travis Simmons and Zoe Jay.

== Building ==
The location of the club is the heritage listed former Chinese Laundry and Dye Works, build in 1896.

== See also ==
- Australian jazz
- William Street Bird
