= Sour Mash (album) =

Studio album by The Beasts of Bourbon
- Released: 1988
- Recorded: 1988
- Studio: Electric Avenue Studios, Sydney Australia
- Genre: Blues rock; post-punk
- Length: 43:48
- Label: Red Eye; RED LP 5
- Producer: Phil Punch and The Beasts

Beasts of Bourbon chronology
The Axeman's Jazz (1984)	Sour Mash (1988)	Black Milk (1990)

Sour Mash is the second album by Australian blues rock band Beasts of Bourbon which was recorded in 1988 and originally released on the Red Eye label.

== Reception ==
Professional ratings
Review scores
Source	Rating
Allmusic	3/5 stars

In the review on Allmusic, Skip Jansen states "With the Johnnys and Scientists both calling it a day just prior to Sour Mash, the collective creative forces were pooled to make the Beasts of Bourbon's landmark in which remains their prime document. A raw blues-rock album with post-punk afflictions ... With the enigmatic Tex Perkins, who could be one of rock & roll's last great frontmen, and the blistering slide-guitar-driven sound, the band does a fine job of re-creating the sound of a twisted night out at the pub".

== Track listing ==
All songs by Kim Salmon and Tex Perkins except where noted

1. "Hard Work Drivin' Man" (Jack Nitzsche, Ry Cooder, Paul Schrader, Tex Perkins, Beasts of Bourbon) – 3:22
2. "Hard for You" (Perkins, Beasts of Bourbon) – 3:30
3. "Watch Your Step" – 2:00
4. "Playground" (Salmon) – 3:58
5. "Door to Your Soul" – 3:37
6. "These Are the Good Old Days" (Spencer P. Jones, Salmon, Perkins) – 3:00
7. "The Hate Inside" (Jones, Perkins) – 3:27
8. "Pig" (Jones, Perkins) – 4:33
9. "Driver Man" (Traditional) – 4:03
10. "Today I Started Loving You Again" (Merle Haggard, Bonnie Owens) – 4:20
11. "Flathead (The Fugitive)" (Salmon) – 2:00
12. "This Ol' Shit" (Perkins) – 2:40
13. "Sun Gods" (Perkins) – 3:18

== Personnel ==
Beasts of Bourbon

- Tex Perkins – vocals, siren, guitar, drum
- Spencer P. Jones – guitar, clock guitar
- Kim Salmon – guitar, slide guitar, wild boar guitar, harmonica, tambourine, conductor
- Boris Sudjovic – bass, tambourine, foot stomping, handclaps
- James Baker – drums, cymbal, handclaps

with:

- Adrian Hornblower – tuba, soprano saxophone, tenor saxophone, baritone saxophone (tracks 6, 8 & 9)

=== Production ===
- Phil Punch – engineer
- Phil Punch and The Beasts – producer
