= Stu Thomas =

Australian musician

- Born: Stuart David Thomas; Canberra, Australia
- Genres: Rock, pop
- Occupations: Singer, musician, songwriter, composer, producer, arranger, multi-instrumentalist, visual artist
- Instruments: Bass guitar, baritone guitar, guitar, trumpet, vocals
- Years active: 1979–current
- Labels: Bar Hum Bug, BANG!, audrey, Beast, Off The Hip
- Website: thestuthomasparadox.bandcamp.com

Stu David Thomas is an Australian musician, born in Canberra, raised in Perth, and musically active in Melbourne since 1990.

He is a multi-instrumentalist, performer, singer, composer, arranger, producer, bass player, guitarist, trumpet player, holds a Diploma of Music, and is a visual artist. Thomas has played in many countries including: Australia, The Netherlands, Switzerland, Germany, Austria, France, Spain, Italy, Slovenia, Bosnia–Herzegovina, Croatia, Slovakia, Portugal, England, Ireland, Scotland, USA, New Zealand, Cocos (Keeling) Islands. Stu has appeared on over 80 releases.

Thomas performs solo or with his band as The Stu Thomas Paradox, mainly in Australia, with appearances in Europe and New Zealand. He has released three solo albums to date: "Devil and Daughter" (2004 Audrey Records, Australia, and 2007 Bang! Records, Spain), "Escape From Algebra" (2010 Bar Hum Bug Records, Australia), and "Counting To Infinity" (2020 Off The Hip Records). An EP "Resonance" (Audrey Records) was released in 2001.

In 2014, he self-released the "Stu plays Lee" EP, following successful shows in Melbourne playing the music of Lee Hazlewood. An abridged version, renamed "Stu Thomas plays Lee Hazlewood", was released in 2015 as a limited edition 8-inch clear vinyl EP on Stu's own Bar Hum Bug label. Stu has continued performances of Hazlewood music, solo or with band, in Darwin, Adelaide & Melbourne, into 2026. In 2014, Stu assembled a group - Stu Thomas (guitar, vocals), Phil Collings (drums), Eddie Miller (bass, vocals), Clare Moore (keyboards, vocals) - and played 2 massive Melbourne shows as The Songs of Lee Hazlewood. They also played in Adelaide with Mal Beveridge (bass) replacing Eddie Miller. In 2023, Stu assembled another group - Stu Thomas (vocals, guitar), Phil Collings (drums, guitar), Rosie Westbrook (double bass), David Lord (harmonica, keyboards) - to commemorate the 60th anniversary of "Trouble Is A Lonesome Town". He opened with a set of Nancy Sinatra songs performed by Stu on guitar with Tanya Lee Davies on vocals & percussion. Stu & Tanya have gone on to play many duo shows of Lee & Nancy songs into 2026. In 2025, Stu assembled another group - Stu (vocals, guitar), Phil collings (drums), Rosie Westbrook (bass), Clare Moore (keyboards), Jack Howard (trumpet) - to commemorate the 55th anniversary of "Cowboy in Sweden". The group also played another massive show called The Best of Nancy & Lee in 2026.

The Stu Thomas Paradox (aka STP) is: Stu Thomas on lead vocals, guitar, Billy Miller on guitar, backing vocals, Eduardo Miller on bass and backing vocals, Phil Collings on drums. Additional players include: Clare Moore (drums/keys/vocals), Mal Beveridge (bass), Stuart Perera (guitar), and John Annas (drums in STP's 2005 debut gig). In 2004, Stu played a solo mini-tour of Berlin, which included German musician Lemmi Schwarz on clarinet and Australian ex-pat Chris Hughes on drums.

During Covid lockdowns of 2020–22, Stu performed a series of live-streamed shows via StageIt, playing songs by Iggy Pop, Lee Hazlewood, Lou Reed, David Bowie's "The Man Who Sold the World", James Bond, and all 3 of Stu's own albums.

In 2020, Stu received a nomination for Best Musician in the Music Victoria Awards.

Thomas is best known for his work as a bass player.

He has played in a large variety of bands since 1979, and came to global attention in late 1995 when he joined Kim Salmon & The Surrealists. He also played with Kim Salmon in Kim Salmon and The Business, and SALMON, as well as in Kim Salmon's solo band, and also Kim Salmon Plays The Scientists. With Kim Salmon, Thomas has toured Australia many times. Together they played three tours of Europe: in 1996 with Kim Salmon and the Surrealists with drummer Greg Bainbridge (as well as USA in 1996). In 2004 Stu played with Kim Salmon Plays The Scientists as a trio with drummer Leanne Cowie and in 2006 as Kim Salmon and the Surrealists (with drummer Phil Collings) at Azkena Rock Festival. Thomas is central to several Kim Salmon & The Surrealists releases including "Ya Gotta Let Me Do My Thing" (1997), "You're Such A Freak" EP (1998), "Grand Unifying Theory" (2010), and "Rantings From The Book of Swamp" (2020), plus other Kim Salmon releases. During lockdown The Surrealists performed 2 days improvising live in Rolling Stock Studios, which was both broadcast live worldwide and recorded. The result of the recordings became the double LP "Rantings From The Book of Swamp". In April 2026, Stu played bass, some guitar and sang in the band Surreal Sound, an Australia-only 3-date audio-visual extravaganza which combined both The Surrealists and The Scientists playing live on the same stage, plus featured projections of artwork by Stu and Kim. Clare Moore played drums for The Scientists, and two Surrealists drummers - Phil Collings and Greg Bainbridge - played during these shows. Both bands played combined for the last few songs. (For more details see Discography.)

Stu found further acclaim joining The Royal Dave Graney Show on bass in 2004. They became Dave Graney & The Lurid Yellow Mist, and later Dave Graney & The mistLY. In 2011 Dave Graney & The mistLY received the Best Victorian Band award at the AGE EG Awards.Thomas is also bassist for Dave Graney 'n' the Coral Snakes, since their re-formation in 2015, touring in 2017 & 2023. Thomas has toured Europe twice with Dave Graney & The MistLY, supporting Nick Cave and the Bad Seeds in 2008 on the Dig, Lazarus, Dig!!! tour, and then a headline tour in 2016, with Scottish guitarist Malcolm Ross. Thomas appears on several Dave Graney band releases including "Hashish and Liqour" (2005), "We Wuz Curious" (2008), "Rock N Roll Is Where I Hide" (2011), "You've Been in My Mind (2012), "Play mistLY For Me" (2015), "ZIPPA DEEDOO WHAT IS/WAS THAT/THIS?" (2019), "In A Mistly" (2022), plus other Dave Graney releases. (For more details see Discography).

In 1997, Thomas founded The Brass Bed, a trash-noir band consisting of brass and rhythm sections, with a notable lack of guitar. The lineup was flexible and in its largest form included two trombones, trumpet, clarinet, bass and drums. In its smallest form: bass and drums. Other forms included harmonica, cello and violin. They released the "low key" EP in 1997, the "No Single" 7 inch white vinyl in 1998, "Resonances: Live Film Music" CD in 2000, "Save Your Breath" CD 2001, and "The Super8 Video LP" DVD in 2007. The Brass Bed played exclusively in Melbourne from 1997 - 2007, apart from one performance as a duo in Auckland, New Zealand in 2001 as a duo (Stu Thomas and Delaney Davidson). They began doing rock gigs, but ended up playing live soundtracks to films in theatres, and galleries. The initial lineup was: Stu Thomas (bass, vocals, trumpet), Delaney Davidson (drums, harmonica), Tatiana Pajo (trombone) and Brian May (trumpet). Subsequent members were Rhys Braddock (drums), Cam McAllister (trumpet), Tim Hilton (trombone), Lemmi Schwarz (clarinet), Sonke Rickertson (drums, cello), Adam Nash (drums), Mike Noga (drums), Sherab Holley (violin) and Phil Collings (drums).

Stu has been involved musically with many artists of note including: Kim Salmon, Mick Harvey, Dave Graney, Clare Moore, Billy Miller, Spencer P. Jones, Rebecca Barnard, Delaney Davidson, Martin Cilia, Dan Brodie, The Spoils, among others.

In 2019, Thomas appeared on the soundtrack to French film Qui m'aime me suive! (aka Just The Three of Us). He sang with Mick Harvey and Xanthe Waite, music by Fred Avril.

Stu is a proponent of the Fender P-Bass, the Burns London baritone guitar, and the Burns Marquee Club series electric guitar. He is in demand for bass, guitar, vocal, trumpet and flugelhorn sessions.

Thomas is also a visual artist having done much graphic art work (esp. music-related), is a painter and also works in a variety of media. His first solo exhibition of kinetic paintings was in 2017 at Brunswick Street Gallery, Fitzroy, Melbourne. His second exhibition (2019) was called "Second Painting Exhibition". It appeared in two Melbourne venues: Carringbush Hotel, and Swamplands. A 2021 group show with Kim Salmon was called "The Surrealists Exhibition" held at One Star Gallery, West Melbourne. Stu's works included kinetic painting, graphic painting, neon works, objet d'art and 3D assemblages. In 2023, his work was part of a group exhibition at One Star Gallery. Stu's 3rd solo exhibition (2024) "FutuRetro - new & early works" encompassed paintings and sculptures, and was held at Louis Joel Gallery, where Stu also performed original music on guitar and trumpet.

In 2020, during concurrent lockdowns Stu was invited by Shane O'Mara (musician) to contribute bass, online, to a new recording project which became a full-blown band called The Silversound, once the members finally met. The other members being Andrew Tanner and Leroy Cope, from Sand Pebbles. Two singles, "Shaker" and "Wolf" appeared early 2023, with the self-titled album released 28 Mar on Cheersquad Records.

== Discography ==
2026

The Brightness Will Come LP by THE SILVERSOUND (Cheersquad)

Hands single by THE SILVERSOUND (Cheersquad)

2025

The Band Who Would Be King LP by GREG BAINBRIDGE (Independent)

Rose City single by THE SILVERSOUND (Cheersquad)

2023

FuzzBoxGirl EP by THE SILVERSOUND (Cheersquad)

The Silversound album by THE SILVERSOUND (Cheersquad)

Wolf single by THE SILVERSOUND (Cheersquad)

2022

Shaker single by THE SILVERSOUND (Cheersquad)

In A Mistly album by DAVE GRANEY & CLARE MOORE (Cockaigne)

2021

I Wish Life Could Be album by SWEDISH MAGAZINES (Rubber)

Music From Yikesville 2020 album by Various Artists (Yikesville / Rhythms)

Saturday Night Bath single by DAVE GRANEY & THE MISTLY (Cockaigne)

Lyve at Byrds album by DAVE GRANEY & THE MISTLY (Cockaigne)

2020

The Entirely Unremarkable World of Jimmy C album by THE JIMMY C (Foghorn)

Rantings From The Book of Swamp album by KIM SALMON & THE SURREALISTS (Independent)

Burn Down The Plantation single by KIM SALMON & THE SURREALISTS (Independent)

Counting To Infinity album by THE STU THOMAS PARADOX (Off The Hip)

2019

The Dog Beneath the Skin album by CHRISTOPHER MARSHALL (Laneway)

One Million Years DC album by DAVE GRANEY & CLARE MOORE (Cockaigne)

Nashville Wife album by 2INCH TAPE (Independent)

Qui M'aime Me Suive! (aka Just The Three of Us) (Original film soundtrack) by FRED AVRIL

ZIPPA DEEDOO WHAT IS/WAS THAT/THIS? album by DAVE GRANEY & THE MISTLY (Cockaigne)

Harmony & Destiny album by MALCOLM HILL & LIVE FLESH (Independent)

Baby, I Wish Been A Better Pop Star single by DAVE GRANEY & THE MISTLY (Cockaigne)

Ultrakeef single by DAVE GRANEY & THE MISTLY (Cockaigne)

2018

Cosmic Love single by MALCOLM HILL & LIVE FLESH (Independent)

I Was Watching The Whole Time album by EDUARDO MILLER (Independent)

Song of Life single by DAVE GRANEY & CLARE MOORE (Cockaigne)

2017

Let's Get Tight album by DAVE GRANEY & CLARE MOORE (Cockaigne)

The Winter's Journey album by JULITHA RYAN (Independent)

2016

Matey, From on High single by DAVE GRANEY (Cockaigne)

Drifting Donna Reed single by DAVE GRANEY (Cockaigne)

2015

The Roots of Kim Salmon live album (online only) by KIM SALMON (Independent)

Stu Thomas plays Lee Hazlewood Vinyl EP by STU THOMAS (Bar Hum Bug)

Australia album by BILLY MILLER (Independent)

Play mistLY For Me live album (online only) by DAVE GRANEY & The mistLY (Cockaigne)

2014

City of Dreams album by MIKELANGELO (Independent)

Stu plays Lee CDEP by STU THOMAS (Bar Hum Bug)

The Man Is Back: A Tribute Johnny Cash by VARIOUS ARTISTS (Beast Records)

2012

You've Been in My Mind album by DAVE GRANEY & The mistLY (Cockaigne/Fuse)

Space Odyssey – Part I album by JANE DUST (Independent)

Hope Addicts album by HOPE ADDICTS (Independent)

2011

Rock N Roll Is Where I Hide album by DAVE GRANEY & THE LURID YELLOW MIST (Liberation)

2010

Put Your Hands on Me album by LITTLE JOHN (Independent)

Penelope album by PENNY IKINGER (Citadel)

Predate single by KIM SALMON & THE SURREALISTS (Low Transit Industries/BANG!)

Jane Dust album by JANE DUST (Vitamin)

Bird's Journey single by JANE DUST (Vitamin)

Grand Unifying Theory by KIM SALMON & THE SURREALISTS (Low Transit Industries/BANG!)

Escape From Algebra by THE STU THOMAS PARADOX (Bar Hum Bug)

2009

Shake Your Derrière / Lost in Space single by THE STU THOMAS PARADOX (Bar Hum Bug)

Live in Hell live album (online only) by DAVE GRANEY & THE LURID YELLOW MIST

Knock Yourself Out album by DAVE GRANEY (Cockaigne/Fuse)

2008

We Wuz Curious album by THE LURID YELLOW MIST feat. DAVE GRANEY & CLARE MOORE (Illustrious Artists/Fuse)

2007

Devil and Daughter (Extra track) album by STU THOMAS (BANG! Records re-issue on digipack & 12" vinyl)

The Super8 Video LP DVD by THE BRASS BED (2007, Bar Hum Bug)

2006

Eat More Baby album by SWEDISH MAGAZINES (Stealth Blonde)

Keepin' It Unreal album by DAVE GRANEY & CLARE MOORE feat. STU D. (Cockaigne/Reverberation)

2005

Hashish & Liquor album by DAVE GRANEY & CLARE MOORE (Cockaigne/Reverberation)

These Beautiful Ghosts album by MARK GARDENER (Sonic Cathedral Records)

Swampbuck Sessions Live (PBSFM)

2004

Free Kicks album by EVEN (El Reno)

Devil and Daughter album by STU THOMAS (Audrey)

2003

In The Valley album by WAYFARING STRANGERS (Independent)

Rosa Duet album by BARB WATERS (Laughing Outlaw)

Resonance EP by STU THOMAS (Audrey)

2002

Take A Bullet single by DAN BRODIE & THE BROKEN ARROWS (EMI)

Jesus Try and Save Me single by DAN BRODIE & THE BROKEN ARROWS (EMI)

2001

You Make Me Wanna Kill single by DAN BRODIE & THE BROKEN ARROWS (EMI)

Empty Arms, Broken Heart album by DAN BRODIE & THE BROKEN ARROWS (EMI)

Hurtsville by album THE SPOILS (Corduroy)

Save Your Breath album by THE BRASS BED (Corduroy)

Triple J: Live And Unleashed album (ABC Music)

2000

Mr Accident SOUNDTRACK album (Serious Entertainment/Festival)

Combination / Love Transfusion split single Picture Disc by THE BRASS BED & LUXEDO (Independent)

I'll Be Around singles by KIM SALMON & THE BUSINESS (Half A Cow)

Disconnected single by KIM SALMON & THE BUSINESS (Half A Cow)

Record album by KIM SALMON & THE BUSINESS (Half A Cow)

Comatosa single by LUXEDO (Corduroy)

City Lights and Road kill album by LUXEDO (Corduroy)

You Really Suck EP by LUXEDO (Corduroy)

Resonances: Live Film Music album by THE BRASS BED (Bar Hum Bug)

1999

Saving Me From Me single by KIM SALMON & THE BUSINESS (Half A Cow)

1998

To Hal & Bacharach – Various Artists album. Australian tribute to Burt Bacharach & Hal David (WEA)

Strange Waters, Small Mercies album by CHRISTOPHER MARSHALL (Mushroom)

You're Such A Freak EP by KIM SALMON & THE SURREALISTS (Half A Cow)

The NO Single single by THE BRASS BED (Bar Hum Bug)

1997

Ya Gotta Let Me Do My Thing album by KIM SALMON & THE SURREALISTS (Half A Cow)

I Won't Tell / World of Love single by KIM SALMON & THE SURREALISTS (Guilt Free)

Fix Me Up single by KIM SALMON & THE SURREALISTS (Guilt Free)

low key EP by THE BRASS BED (Blah Blah Blah)

The Gold Record EP by THE BRASS BED (Bar Hum Bug)

1991

Nu Music Sampler featuring : Seven Year Itch single by ORGANISM (Studio 52)

Organism EP cassette by ORGANISM (Independent)
