= Black Milk (Beasts of Bourbon album) =

Studio album by Beasts of Bourbon
- Released: July 1990
- Recorded: January 1990
- Studio: Electric Avenue Studios, Sydney Australia
- Genre: Blues rock
- Length: 43:48
- Label: Red Eye; RED LP 12
- Producer: Phil Punch and The Beasts

Beasts of Bourbon chronology
Sour Mash (1988)	Black Milk (1990)	The Low Road (1991)

Black Milk is the third album by Australian blues rock band Beasts of Bourbon which was recorded in 1990 and originally released on the Red Eye label.

== Details ==
Salmon said, "We recorded Black Milk with all these crazy dynamics and there's too many ideas on it really. I love it! The Beasts Of Bourbon really believed could do anything. I was willing to use that idea to get my songs on, like "Cool Fire" would never dare be presented to the Scientists – it's an old 40s sounding song. We've tried to be like Dr. John, every song on the album is different."

== Reception ==
Professional ratings
Review scores
Source	Rating
Allmusic	2/5 stars

In the review on Allmusic, Skip Jansen states "Third album from the Australian garage punk and pub rock super-group is a fine album of lurching blues-driven rock, though it pales by comparison to the two previous albums".

== Track listing ==
All songs by Spencer Jones and Tex Perkins except where noted

1. "Black Milk" – 5:55
2. "Finger Lickin'" – 2:09
3. "Cool Fire" (Kim Salmon) – 4:13
4. "Bad Revisited" – 3:58
5. "Hope You Find Your Way to Heaven" (Salmon) – 2:40
6. "Words from a Woman to Her Man" (Salmon) – 2:48
7. "I'm So Happy I Could Cry" (Salmon) – 4:18
8. "You Let Me Down" (Jones) – 4:33
9. "Let's Get Funky" (Hound Dog Taylor) – 3:35
10. "A Fate Much Worse Than Life" – 3:09
11. "El Beasto" (Salmon, Perkins) – 1:33
12. "Blue Stranger" (Salmon, Perkins) – 4:12
13. "I've Let You Down Again" (Salmon, Perkins) – 2:33
14. "Blanc Garcon" – 4:12
15. "Execution Day" (Jones) – 4:46
16. "Rest in Peace" (Perkins) – 3:12

== Personnel ==
Beasts of Bourbon

- Tex Perkins – vocals, guitar
- Spencer Jones – guitar, vocal, banjo-mandolin
- Kim Salmon – guitar, fish, vocals
- Boris Sudjovic – bass
- James Baker – drums, percussion

with:

- Louis Tillett – piano
- Peter Casanela – piano accordion
- Dr. Bronstontine Karlarka, Hellen Rose – vocals

=== Production ===
- Phil Punch – engineer
- Phil Punch and The Beasts – producer

== Charts ==
Chart performance for Black Milk
Chart (1990)	Peak position
Australian Albums (ARIA)	142
