= Still Here (The Beasts album) =

Studio album by the Beasts
- Released: 2019
- Studio: Soundpark (Melbourne)
- Genre: Rock
- Label: Bang!
- Producer: Andrew Hehir

The Beasts chronology
30 Years on Borrowed Time (as the Beasts of Bourbon) (2013)	Still Here (2019)

Still Here is the debut album by Australian band the Beasts, released by Bang! Records in 2019. The members of the band had all previously played with the Beasts of Bourbon, with the change of name due to the death of Spencer P. Jones and Brian Hooper.

== Details ==
The inspiration for the album was the death of Brian Hooper, who had been the long-term bassist of the Beasts of Bourbon, in April 2018. After his funeral, other former members arranged a recording session. The original idea was to get all former members together, but James Baker was unable to attend due to health issues. Founding member Spencer P. Jones was only able to contribute one song before his own death in August. The album continued with a change of band name to the Beasts. Kim Salmon said, "With respect, this isn't the Beasts of Bourbon. It would need to have Jonesy on every track to be that! But loudly and proudly this is: The Beasts Still Here."

Jones was the first person to contribute a song to the project, "At the Hospital". Perkins said, "He was totally into it, but he was very ill at the time. He was very sick and it took a lot out of him to do that. We were lucky to get one song out of Jonesy: he just came to the studio and we set him up a comfy chair and basically just said, 'Play whatever you like whenever you like.'

Every member of the band besides drummer Pola contributed to the song-writing. Covers were recorded of songs by former members Hooper and Jones. Jones' song, "Drunk on a Train", had previously been recorded by his band The Painkillers. Salmon's "Pearls Before Swine" had been offered to the band for their previous album (when he wasn't a member), but was declined. Salmon said, "I'm so happy about that because I always thought it was a theme song for the band and that was my intention to write one, even though I'd left. To do a song like that you can't just approach it as a boast, you have to be a bit self-deprecating."

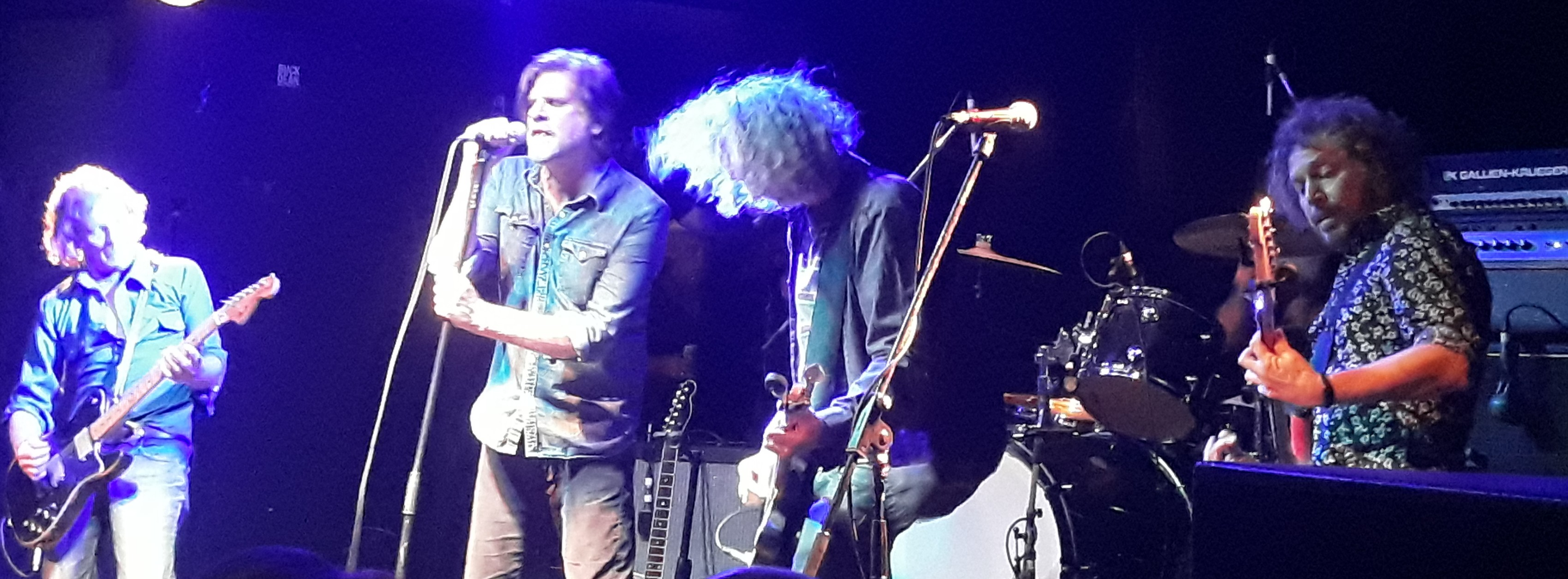
(l-r)Owen, Perkins, Sujdovic, Salmon

Sujdovic said of the recording process, "we didn't rehearse them before we went in, and we didn't do too much to them, we just learnt the songs when we were in the studio, and as we were learning them we recorded them. So we recorded them pretty much live."

Two covers were recorded from outside the band. Frank Zappa's "The Torture Never Stops" and Warren Zevon's "My Shit's Fucked Up", both suggested by Perkins. Owen said, "I worked on "My Shit's Fucked Up". I really got taken by the David Letterman performance where he's on his own on guitar. I simplified it, dumbing down the riff."

== Reception ==
Double J said, "Some of it is sublime. The two opening tracks are both completely ferocious. Dirty, scary and just cacophonous enough to knock you down without rendering you completely lifeless." They did note that the ballads didn't have the same, "warped, semi-psychotic feel as similarly paced songs from their early years".

The Music said both opening songs, "possess the right amount of grit and sleaze, worthy additions to the Beasts' canon of work". The album was called a "flawed beast" but the reviewer noted, "they always were weren't they? That was, and remains, the band's charm."

== Track listing ==
No.	Title	Writer(s)	Length
1.	"On My Back"	Tex Perkins	3:31
2.	"Pearls Before Swine"	Kim Salmon	3:20
3.	"My Shit's Fucked Up"	Warren Zevon	3:14
4.	"Just Let Go"	Perkins	4:20
5.	"At the Hospital"	Spencer P. Jones	5:30
6.	"Drunk on a Train"	James Baker; Josh Reynolds	3:05
7.	"The Torture Never Stops"	Frank Zappa	5:04
8.	"It's All Lies"	Salmon; Perkins	2:27
9.	"What the Hell Was I Thinking"	Brian Hooper	3:27
10.	"Don't Pull Me Over"	Boris Sujdovic	3:25
11.	"Your Honour"	Salmon; Perkins; Charlie Owen	2:21

== Personnel ==
- Kim Salmon – guitar, banjo, vocals
- Tony Pola – drums
- Boris Sujdovic – bass
- Charlie Owen – guitar, banjo, organ
- Tex Perkins – vocals, guitar on "Just Let Go"
