= Michael Armiger =

English-born Australian guitarist and teacher

- Born: Michael William Armiger; Hertfordshire, England
- Genre: Rock music
- Occupations: Guitarist, music teacher
- Instruments: Guitars: lead, bass, rhythm
- Years active: 1978–2012
- Formerly of: The Immigrants; Paul Kelly Band; Paul Kelly and the Coloured Girls; 10000 Guitars; John Kennedy's Love Gone Wrong; The Johnnys; The Go-Betweens; Sean Kelly and the Iron Dukes; Cleopatra Wong; Atlas Strings

Michael William Armiger is an English-born Australian guitarist and teacher. He has been a member of various groups including Paul Kelly Band (1983–84), Paul Kelly and the Coloured Girls (1985–86), John Kennedy's Love Gone Wrong (1987–88), The Johnnys (1988–89, 1991), The Go-Betweens (1989), and Sean Kelly and the Iron Dukes (1990).

== Biography ==
Michael William Armiger was born in Hertfordshire. His father, John, played double bass, piano and sang in local bands; his mother also played piano and sang. His older brothers are Martin (born 1949), Keith and Andrew, and his younger brother is Christopher (born 1965). The family migrated to Australia by 1965 and they lived in Elizabeth, South Australia. In 1978 he formed The Immigrants with his brothers Keith and Andrew, and with Rod Greig, Andy Thomas, and Kym Webster. The group broke up in 1980. Soon after Armiger and his brothers, Keith and Andrew, left Adelaide for Melbourne and formed 10000 Guitars.

By August 1983 Armiger had joined Paul Kelly Band on bass guitar alongside Kelly on lead vocals and guitar. Back in 1977 Armiger's oldest brother Martin, on lead guitar, had been a bandmate with Kelly in a pub rock group, The High Rise Bombers. Other members of Kelly's 1983 backing band were Chris Coyne on saxophone, Maurice Frawley (ex-Paul Kelly and the Dots) on guitar, Greg Martin (Mick Pealing and the Ideals, Little Murders, Goanna) on drums. Late that year Michael Barclay (Japanese Comix, Little Murders, Runners, the Zimmermen) replaced Martin on drums.

In 1984 the line up changed further with Steve Connolly (Cuban Heels, Rare Things, Zimmermen) replacing Frawley on guitar before Kelly disbanded the group and relocated to Sydney. Early in the next year Kelly recorded an album, Post (May 1985), with session musicians. Soon after its release Armiger joined Paul Kelly and the Coloured Girls with Barclay, and Connolly, they were joined by Peter Bull on keyboards. Armiger recorded with the group for their double-album, Gossip, but had left by the time it was released in September 1986.

Early in 1987 Armiger joined John Kennedy's Love Gone Wrong replacing Barry Turnbull on bass guitar. Other members were Kennedy on lead vocals; Wayne Connolly on lead guitar; Cory Messenger on vocals and rhythm guitar; and Vincent Sheehan on drums. Kennedy described their sound to Andree Coelli of The Canberra Times as "pop/rock format ... we're augmenting the sound in recordings with keyboards and a little bit of brass". The group issued a single, "The Singing City", in September, which dealt with Kennedy's birth town of Liverpool. They followed with an album, Always the Bridegroom, in December. Another single, "World Upside Down", was issued in May of the next year and by August the group broke up after Armiger accepted an invitation to join The Johnnys.

By late 1988 the line up of The Johnnys was Armiger on bass guitar with Paul Doherty on guitar; Billy Pommer Jr. on drums; and Spencer P. Jones on guitar and vocals. The group toured in support of their second album, Grown Up Wrong, which had been recorded before Armiger joined. A single, "Anything Could Happen", appeared in November but the band dissolved early in the next year. Armiger joined The Go-Betweens in 1989 to replace John Willsteed on bass guitar; alongside Amanda Brown on violin, oboe, guitar, keyboards, and backing vocals; Robert Forster on vocals and guitar; Grant McLennan on vocals and guitar; and Lindy Morrison on drums and vocals. That group disbanded later in the same year.

During 1990 Armiger was briefly a member of three successive groups: Snakey Blake's Bon Ton Experience, Sean Kelly and the Iron Dukes and Mary-Jo Starr and The Drive-in Motel (alongside former bandmate Frawley). He joined fellow ex-The Go-Betweens, Brown and Morrison, in a pop group, Cleopatra Wong, with Colin Bloxsom on percussion and guitar; David Lane on keyboards; and Mark Moffatt on guitar and pedal steel. They issued a six-track extended play, Egg, in February 1992 and followed with a five-track EP, Cleopatra's Lament in March of the next year.

However Armiger had already left to form Roadhead with Ben Mullins (The Pheromones, The Madisons, The Benedicts) on vocals and guitar. When Andrew Axton joined on drums they were renamed Atlas Strings. Their "sound mixed melodic pop with a contemporary folk outlook". They issued a self-titled six-track EP in 1994, which was followed by another EP, Carelessly later that year. Greg Throsby joined on guitar and they issued another two EPs in 1995, Miss Judas (July) and Needs (November). The group released their debut studio album, Dagger Stare, in May 1997 but both Armiger and Throsby had left before it appeared.

Armiger completed a B.A. Communications and Masters Teaching (primary), and, as of February 2013, is a music teacher.
