= Olympic Sideburns =

Australian psychobilly band

- Origin: Melbourne, Australia
- Genres: Shockabilly, rock 'n' roll
- Years active: 1982–1988
- Labels: Strine; Major; Doc/White/Mushroom
- Past members: Lindy Allen; Peter "Jex" Byron; Ian Hill; Spencer P. Jones; Tom McEwan; David "George" Spencer; Jimmy Williams; Maurice Frawley; Paul Bryant; Chuck Meo; Maurice Molletta; Philip Brophy; Calum McAlpine; Alan Brooker

Olympic Sideburns were an Australian shockabilly band formed in late 1982. The line-up of Paul Bryant on bass guitar, Peter "Jex" Byron on lead vocals, Maurice Frawley on lead guitar and vocals, Ian Hill on keyboards and Maurice Molletta on drums issued their debut album, The Olympic Sideburns (1985). Calum McAlpine on drums had joined in late 1985 and the group released their second album, Dixie Truck Stop! (1987), before disbanding in 1988. Australian musicologist Ian McFarlane compared their two albums, the latter has "more authentic Rolling Stones/Creedence Clearwater Revival sound as opposed to the previous punk/psychedelic/shockabilly hybrid" of the former. Maurice Frawley died in 2009 and founding guitarist Spencer P. Jones died in 2018.

== History ==
Olympic Sideburns were formed as a shockabilly band by Lindy Allen on bass guitar, Peter "Jex" Byron on lead vocals (ex-Glamstars), Ian Hill on keyboards (ex-Crackajacks), Spencer P. Jones on guitar and vocals (ex-Cuban Heels, Beats Working, North 2 Alaskans), Tom McEwan on drums and David "George" Spencer on lead guitar (ex-Glamstars) in Melbourne in late 1982. According to Australian musicologist Ian McFarlane "shockabilly or psychobilly" was the combination of "Americanised garage-punk, swamp blues, 1950s rockabilly, 1960s psychedelia and voodoo imagery".

By the start of 1983 Jones had left for Sydney to join pub rockers, the Johnnys. He was initially replaced by Jimmy Williams and then by Maurice Frawley on lead guitar and vocals (ex-Paul Kelly and the Dots). Allen was replaced on bass guitar by Paul Bryant (ex-Corporate Body) and Chuck Meo (ex-Dorian Gray) took over drums from McEwan. The line-up of Bryant, Byron, Frawley, Hill, Meo and Spencer recorded a four-track extended play, Drunkyard at the end of that year, which was issued in May 1984 via Strine Records. Maurice Molletta replaced Meo on drums and they recorded a single, "13th Floor", which was produced by Tony Cohen. Hill left and the group recorded their self-titled studio album, which was issued in May 1985 via Major Records. It was produced by the band with John Archer. Philip Brophy (ex-→ ↑ →) took over from Molletta on drums. By the end of the year Brophy was replaced by Calum McAlpine (ex-Chosen Few, Rah Rah the Flag).

Olympic Sideburns signed to Mushroom's label Doc/White in August 1987. The Doc label had been set up by fellow Melbourne group, Painters and Dockers, with label manager Lobby Loyde's aim "to keep the record press in Melbourne for the sake of small bands" such as X and Olympic Sideburns. The band released their second studio album, Dixie Truck Stop!, in the following month, which was produced by Francois Taviaux. The Canberra Times' Lisa Wallace observed, "Brash, rough and not terribly uplifting, these young lads may go far, but not as rock and rollers." McFarlane felt they had developed "a more authentic Rolling Stones/Creedence Clearwater Revival sound as opposed to the previous punk/psychedelic/shockabilly hybrid." Matt Bartley of Tharunka noticed the difference from their debut album, "distortion and feedback [are] still there but not so apparent", while the production is "quite slick and this adds to the [band's] sound". Bryant was replaced by Alan Brooker (ex-Paul Kelly and the Dots, Little Murders, the Zimmermen) on bass guitar. The group disbanded at the end of 1988.

=== Afterwards ===
Brophy expanded his career into screen music, academia and radio broadcasting. Hill formed a garage rock band the Bo-Weevils in 1985. Byron and McAlpine formed briefly existing band, Dirt with Lobby Loyde on guitar in 1990 alongside Tim Brosnan, Mick Holmes, Geordie Leach and Trevor Young. In 2006 Brooker, Frawley and Williams formed the Yard Hands, which issued an album, Good Things in June of that year. Maurice Frawley died of liver cancer on 16 May 2009. Spencer P. Jones also died of liver cancer on 21 August 2018.

== Members ==
- Lindy Allen – bass guitar
- Peter "Jex" Byron – lead vocals
- Ian Hill – keyboards
- Spencer P. Jones – guitar, backing vocals (died 2018)
- Tom McEwan – drums
- David "George" Spencer – lead guitar
- Jimmy Williams – guitar
- Maurice Frawley – lead guitar, backing vocals
- Paul Bryant – bass guitar
- Chuck Meo – drums
- Maurice Molletta – drums
- Philip Brophy – drums
- Calum McAlpine – drums, backing vocals
- Alan Brooker – bass guitar

== Discography ==
=== Albums ===
- The Olympic Sideburns (May 1985) – Major Records (MRLP001)
- Dixie Truck Stop! (September 1987) – Doc/White/Mushroom (L-38755)

=== Extended plays ===
- Drunkyard (May 1984) – Strine (SR 001)
- I've Been Away (1985) – New Rose (NEW 54)

=== Singles ===
- "13th Floor" (1984) – Strine
- "Here Comes the Rain" (1987) – White/Mushroom
