= Gone (Beasts of Bourbon album) =

Studio album by Beasts of Bourbon
- Released: 1996
- Recorded: 1996
- Studio: Seed Studio, Melbourne
- Genre: Rock
- Language: English
- Label: Red Eye
- Producer: Beasts of Bourbon

Beasts of Bourbon chronology
| Europe 1992 (1994) | Gone (1996) | Low Life (2005) |

Gone is the fifth studio album by the Australian rock band Beasts of Bourbon, released in 1996.

== Track listing ==
1. "Saturated" (Words: Charlie Owen, Ian Rilen, Music: Owen) - 3:53
2. "Fake" (Words: Tex Perkins, Music: Beasts of Bourbon) - 4:07
3. "Makem Cry" (Words: Perkins, Music: Spencer P. Jones) - 1:48
4. "Mullett" (Beasts of Bourbon) - 1:36
5. "Get On" (Words: Perkins, Music: Beasts of Bourbon) - 2:54
6. "I S'pose" (Words: Perkins, Music: Jones) - 4:08
7. "What a Way to Live" (Words: Brian Hooper, Music: Owen) - 4:16
8. "That Sinking Feeling Again" (Words: Owen, Perkins, Music: Owen) - 3:01
9. "So Long" (Words: Perkins, Music: Hooper) - 3:22
10. "Is That Love" (Words: Perkins, Music: Owen) - 3:45
11. "This Day is Over" (Words: Perkins, Music: Owen) - 3:51
12. "Unfolded" (Music: Jones) - 1:31

== Personnel ==
- Tex Perkins - vocals
- Spencer P. Jones - guitar
- Charlie Owen - guitar, harmonica, tambourine
- Brian Hooper - bass
- Tony Pola - drums

Technical

- Tim Johnston - engineer
- Tony Cohen, Tim Johnston - recording
- Kristyna Higgins - cover photography
