= Weird Love =

Studio album by Scientists
- Released: 1986
- Genre: Grunge; swamp rock; post-punk; alternative rock
- Length: 39:12
- Label: Karbon

Weird Love is the sixth full-length album by Australian rock band The Scientists, released in 1986 by record label Karbon. It consists of new recordings from their earlier singles and EPs during 3 days in London with Richard Mazda for the US market.

== Reception ==
Professional ratings
Review scores
Source	Rating
AllMusic	4.5/5 stars
Trouser Press	favourable

AllMusic called the album "a bash fest from the start that is relentlessly powerful and intense". Trouser Press called it "poundingly intense".

== Track listing ==
All tracks are written by Kim Salmon, except where noted.

No.	Title	Writer(s)	Length
1.	"Swampland"	Salmon, Kim Williams	4:27
2.	"Hell Beach"		2:35
3.	"Demolition Derby"	Salmon, Boris Sujdovic	4:42
4.	"Murderess in a Purple Dress"		2:21
5.	"We Had Love"		4:16
6.	"Nitro"	Salmon, Tony Thewlis	2:32
7.	"If It's the Last Thing I Do"		3:56
8.	"Lead Foot"		3:13
9.	"When Fate Deals Its Mortal Blow"		2:42
10.	"Atom Bomb Baby"		3:13
11.	"Set It on Fire"		2:37
12.	"You Only Live Twice"	Leslie Bricusse, John Barry	2:38
Total length:			39:12
