= The Axeman's Jazz =

Studio album by The Beasts of Bourbon
- Released: July 1984
- Recorded: October 1983
- Studio: Paradise Studios, Sydney Australia
- Genre: Swamp rock; country blues
- Length: 41:15
- Label: Green/Big Time; BT-7032
- Producer: Roger Greirson

Beasts of Bourbon chronology
The Axeman's Jazz (1984)	Sour Mash (1988)

The Axeman's Jazz is the debut album by Australian blues rock band Beasts of Bourbon which was recorded in October 1983 and originally released in 1984 on the Green/Big Time label.

== Recording ==
The album was recorded in one day, live to 2-track, with the final mix being done as the band played. Engineer Tony Cohen said the band, "were not going to play something three times. They'd get sick of it." "Psycho" was the only song given longer attention, with the band listening to the Jack Kittel version to learn the chords prior to recording.

Biographer Patrick Emery said the band was fuelled by "VB and speed. By later afternoon, James Baker's drumkit was flanked by two mountains of beer cans." Kim Salmon said, "It was a whole day of boozing on. I was pretty wasted by the end of it." Jones, who was photographed drunk under the mixing desk, said, "There wasn't enough room for everyone on the couch, so I climbed under the desk to listen down there, and the I just fell asleep because I was really tired." When leaving the studio, Cohen said, "Spencer was so drunk, they had to pick him up by the arms and the legs and dump him in the carpark."

== Reception ==
Professional ratings
Review scores
Source	Rating
Allmusic	3/5 stars

In the review on Allmusic, Kathleen C. Fennessy said "Considering how little time was actually spent on recording it, The Axeman's Jazz is a surprisingly accomplished debut. If not quite as successful as 1988's follow-up, Sour Mash, it remains an energetic collection of grungy swamp rock with a side of countrified blues". Ian McFarlane of Juke Magazine said, "The frequent references to murder, graveyards, coffins and disease in the lyrics is morbid and unnerving."

In 1991, Perkins said, "We stretched doing "Pycho" out for as long as possible because we knew people liked hearing it, but we won't be doing it anymore. Every show we hear the familiar cry of 'Ten Wheels for fucking Jesus.... ya cunt!' We haven't done it in fuckin' five years but someone will always ask for it. It's a really dumb fuckin' thrashed out piece of hillbilly idiocy."

== Track listing ==
All songs by Spencer P. Jones and Tex Perkins except where noted

1. "Evil Ruby" – 3:33
2. "Love and Death" – 4:04
3. "Graveyard Train" (John Fogerty) – 7:15
4. "Psycho" (Leon Payne) – 3:57
5. "Drop Out" (James Baker, Kim Salmon) – 3:04
6. "Save Me a Place" (Salmon, Perkins) – 5:38
7. "Lonesome Bones" (Perkins) – 4:33
8. "The Day Marty Robbins Died" – 3:20
9. "Ten Wheels for Jesus" (Perkins) – 5:24

== Personnel ==
Beasts of Bourbon

- Tex Perkins – vocals
- Spencer P. Jones – guitar
- Kim Salmon – guitar
- Boris Sudjovic – bass
- James Baker – drums

=== Production ===
- Tony Cohen – engineer
- Tim Greig – engineer
- Roger Greirson – executive producer
