= Maurice Frawley =

- Born: Maurice Gerard Frawley; 5 May 1954
- Origin: Elmore, Victoria, Australia
- Died: 16 May 2009 (aged 55) Rochester, Victoria, Australia
- Genres: Australian rock, country blues
- Occupations: Singer-songwriter, guitarist
- Instruments: vocals, guitar
- Years active: 1979–2009
- Labels: Strine; White; Id/Mercury; Campaspe; Red Finn

Maurice Gerard Frawley (5 May 1954 – 16 May 2009) was an Australian rock and country blues singer-songwriter and guitarist.

== Early life and education ==
Maurice Gerard Frawley was born on 5 May 1954, the son of Gerard Patrick and Eileen Marie Frawley, he grew up with three siblings, Brendan, Mary and Leo, on the family farm near Elmore, Victoria. He attended Our Lady of the Sacred Heart School (a Catholic primary school) in Elmore, Rochester Lourdes High School in nearby Rochester and then Salesian College in Sunbury (an outer suburb of Melbourne), where he completed an agricultural studies course.

== Career ==
After working in wool sheds in rural Victoria, he moved to Melbourne in the late 1970s to pursue a musical career.

Frawley formed power pop band Japanese Comix in 1979, with vocalist Shane Day (ex-Cruisers, High Rise Bombers), bass guitarist Chris Jobson, drummer Greg Simpkins and James Williams (High Rise Bombers). They played the Melbourne pub circuit and released a four-track extended play, Japanese Comix on the Mambo Records label in 1980. Simpkins was replaced by Michael Barclay but the group soon disbanded. As a melodic guitarist, Frawley developed a reputation as a down-to-earth, "musician's musician". Late in 1980 he had a brief stint in A Howling Life with Day, Williams and Bill Tulloch.

In late 1981, Frawley replaced Mick Holmes on guitar in Paul Kelly and the Dots (Kelly was ex-High Rise Bombers) after that band had recorded their second album Manila. The album's release was delayed until August 1982 due to line-up changes and Kelly being side-lined with a broken jaw. While working with Kelly, Frawley co-wrote "Look So Fine, Feel So Low". The band recorded "Rocking Institution" for the soundtrack of pop musical film, Starstruck. It was released as a shared single with Jo Kennedy's "Body and Soul", which peaked at No. 5 in May 1982 on the Australian Kent Music Report Singles Chart. The Dots disbanded by August 1983 and Frawley briefly joined the Paul Kelly Band but left before year's end. Kelly relocated to Sydney in late 1984 and "Look So Fine, Feel So Low" appeared on his solo album Post (1985), it was re-recorded by Paul Kelly & the Messengers for Gossip (1986) and released as a single in July 1987, which did not reach the Top 50.

Frawley joined Olympic Sideburns late in 1983, an ever-evolving shockabilly outfit that had featured Spencer P. Jones (later in The Johnnys, The Beasts of Bourbon) which formed in 1982. Rooted in classic 1960s garage rock, their 'Oz-indie' racket made them distinct from most groups in the suburban beer barns. The Olympic Sideburns was a collection of 1980s alternative artists. The band released two albums, The Olympic Sideburns in May 1985 and Dixie Truck Stop! in 1987. They disbanded by end of 1988. In 1989 he produced an EP for The Romeos.

In 1990, Frawley formed Big City Burnout with Jack Abeyratne on guitar, Nigel Hartford on bass guitar (ex-White Cross), David Sandford on saxophone, piano and vocals, and Paul Wall on drums. By 1993 he formed Maurice Frawley and Working Class Ringos, a rootsy country-blues band. The line-up was drummer Des Hefner (The Birthday Party, The Slaughtermen), guitarist Charlie Owen (The New Christs, The Divinyls), and bass player Shane Walsh. Cold Chisel's Don Walker described the group as "the best after-midnight band in the world". Owen called them "the bad boys of folk" who played "the most passionate, beautiful, rollicking, cheeky, heartfelt music you could ever hear".

Working Class Ringos released an extended play, Whoop Whoop, a raw, acoustic recording of soul and blues, in 1994. It was followed by their debut album Livin' Lazy (May 1995), a more electric album which featured Jones and was produced by Tony Cohen. In 1998 Conway Savage (Nick Cave and the Bad Seeds) joined on piano. Their second album Triple-Skin Marquee was released in 2000, again produced by Cohen. It features a duet, "Would You Be My Friend", between Frawley and Kelly. For thirteen years the band played the Melbourne pub circuit, establishing a base at The Esplanade Hotel in St Kilda. In 2000 the band's track "Harness Down" was included on the Australian Broadcasting Corporation's Airplay Vol. 3 compilation, which was featured on local radio. "Harness Down" became a favourite of its audience. The band made several tours through the east coast up to Far North Queensland. Frawley and his band performed live sessions in 2000 on the ABC TV's national music program Studio 22 and in 2001 on the cable channel Country Music Television. Frawley became a regular at the Tamworth Country Music Festival.

In 2003, Frawley embarked on a family musical project, Frawleys and Friends, that culminated in the release Queen of Runnymede featuring the songs of a relative, Sarah Frawley, who had died (aged 19) from a brain aneurysm.

In 2006, Frawley reunited with former band mates Michael Barclay on drums and Alan Brooker on bass guitar, together with Garrett Costigan on pedal steel and Jimmy Williams on guitar to form Maurice Frawley and the Yard Hands. Their debut album Good Things was released on Frawley's own Red Finn Records.

Frawley returned to rural Rochester to care for his ill mother, Eileen. His brother Leo recalled, "Maurice was a great support to mum during her last few years and mum's passing last year left a hole in Maurice's life". Frawley became a part-time music teacher at Rochester Secondary College. He provided inspiration to younger musicians, teaching and mentoring acts including Dan Brodie, Tom Carlyon, and Clinkerfield.

== Illness and death ==
In January 2009, Frawley performed at 'Life's What You Make It', a tribute to late Melbourne band manager Linda Gebar, alongside Not Drowning, Waving, The Killjoys and others. It was his last live performance. He died on 16 May, shortly after diagnosis with liver cancer, at Rochester Hospital. He was survived by his former wife, Penny, and their son Martin.

== Legacy ==
Owen, Kelly, Walker, Tex Perkins, Chrissy Amphlett, The Drones, The Kill Devil Hills, Megan Washington, Adalita, and Dan Sultan, combined to create a 3×CD tribute album, Long Gone Whistle – The Songs of Maurice Frawley, which was released in August 2010. On 19 August 2010, artists who contributed to the CD, performed a fund raising show at the Esplanade Hotel to raise funds to continue the music program established by Frawley at Rochester Secondary College. His son Martin, the former frontman of Twerps (band), continues in the Melbourne music scene.

== Discography ==
=== Japanese Comix ===
- Japanese Comix (EP) (1979)

=== The Olympic Sideburns ===
- Drunkyard (EP) – Strine (May 1984)
- "13th Floor" – Strine (1984)
- The Olympic Sideburns – Major (May 1985)
- Dixie Truck Stop! – White Label (L38755) (September 1987)

=== Maurice Frawley and Working Class Ringos ===
- Whoop Whoop – Blue Dog Music (WOOF4) (1993)
- Livin' Lazy – Id/Mercury (ID00362) (1994)
- Triple-Skin Marquee – Empire (2000)

=== Frawleys and Friends ===
- Queen of Runnymede – Campaspe (CR/001) (1 April 2003)

=== Maurice Frawley and the Yard Hands ===
- Good Things – Red Finn (REDFIN001) (April 2006)
