= John Kennedy (Australian musician) =

Australian musician and singer-songwriter

- Also known as: John Francis Kennedy
- Born: 1 July 1958 (age 68); Liverpool, England, United Kingdom
- Origin: Brisbane, Queensland, Australia
- Genres: Country, R&B
- Occupation: Musician
- Instruments: Vocals, guitar
- Years active: 1980–present
- Labels: Waterfront; Red Eye; Mighty Boy; Twang!; PolyGram

John Francis Kennedy (born John Kennedy 1 July 1958) is an English-born Australian musician and singer-songwriter–guitarist. He has been the leader of a number of groups including JFK & the Cuban Crisis (1980–84), and John Kennedy's Love Gone Wrong (1984–88). In 1984 he described his music as "urban and western".

== Early life ==
John Kennedy was born in Liverpool, England on 1 July 1958. His father's name is also John Kennedy. In October 1965 the Kennedy family migrated to Australia and settled in Brisbane. Kennedy took the confirmation name, Francis, when he was ten and – as his middle name – it completes the famous JFK initials. According to his website, "It seemed like a good idea at the time. The joke has long since worn off for him, but it still takes some explaining." Kennedy grew up in Acacia Ridge, where he developed a preference for country-influenced music, especially Elvis Costello's debut album, My Aim Is True (July 1977). He later recalled that "My parents listened to a lot of popular country – people like Burl Ives, Tom Jones, who was doing country then, and Johnny Cash... It was quite sophisticated country music – big vocals and a big production sound."

== JFK & the Cuban Crisis ==
John Kennedy, on lead vocals and guitar, formed his first band, JFK & the Cuban Crisis, with former school friend James Paterson on vocals and guitar in Brisbane in October 1980. The rest of the initial line-up were John Downie on bass guitar and Stephen Pritchard on drums. They established themselves on the local scene, taking up a residency at 279 Club, with their smart Squeeze influenced pop. According to Australian musicologist Ian McFarlane, they "played a brand of jangly guitar pop with country overtones." They released two cassette albums, Over the Underpass and Under the Overpass (1981) and Down and Out in Brisbane and Sydney (1982). The line up changed in 1981 with Oscar Beath taking over bass duties and Paul Hardman adding keyboards. They played support spots for The Pretenders and Ian Dury and the Blockheads. The band issued their debut single, "Am I a Pagan", in March 1982 and then moved to Sydney in May.

For the Sydney line up of the band Kennedy and Paterson recruited a new rhythm section: Greg Hall on bass guitar and Paul Rochelli on drums. They started a residency at the Southern Cross Hotel in Surry Hills. A four-track extended play, Careless Talk Costs Lives (December 1982), had been recorded in Brisbane earlier and was the first release on the new Waterfront Records label. It featured the song, "The Texan Thing", which received alternative radio airplay. Kennedy had started writing it as "Take Something", which was a "jaunty keyboard-driven song". When Paterson recommended "The Texan Thing" as their next single, Kennedy thought "that's a bit rude, he'd already had the A-side of the first single, and now he was mentioning this song I'd never heard of". However Paterson had "misheard ['Take Something'] as 'Texan Thing'. So I had to go back and rewrite the lyrics."

JFK & the Cuban Crisis were established on the inner city live scene alongside contemporaries, The Triffids. In April 1984 they issued a three-track EP, The Ballad of Jackie O, and followed in May with their studio album, The End of the Affair. In June that year, Kennedy disbanded the group due to "musical differences". In September 1986 Stuart Coupe of The Canberra Times observed that he "suffered, as he still does, from accusations that he was imitating the nasal tones of Elvis Costello – something that's still very noticeable – but Kennedy insists that it's just coincidence."

== John Kennedy's Love Gone Wrong ==
Kennedy embarked on his solo career by releasing a single, "Forget", in September 1984 on Waterfront Records. To promote it he formed John Kennedy's Love Gone Wrong (from early 1987, it was trimmed to Love Gone Wrong). Alongside Kennedy were Graham Lee on guitar., pedal steel and vocals; Adrian Bingham on saxophone; Jonathan "Ike" Liklitter on double bass; Peter Kennard (ex-Rockmelons) on percussion; Peter Timmerman (ex-Cheatin' Hearts) on drums and Martin Tucker on piano. Kennedy described his music as "urban and western". The band released a single, "Miracle (in Marrickville)" in March 1985. Also in that month Colin Bloxsom joined on lead guitar (ex-Pop Rivets).

John Kennedy's Love Gone Wrong appeared on the TV talent quest series, Starsearch, winning four heats and making the final in April 1985. Kennedy and Bloxsom were joined by Mark Dawson on drums, Margaret Labi on harmony vocals and Barry Turnbull (ex-Chad's Tree) on bass guitar. This line-up toured the Australian eastern states and recorded another single, "King Street" (November 1985). Coupe described their work "Most notable among the records are 'King Street', an ode to the main street in the inner Sydney suburb of Newtown, and 'Miracle in Marrickville', a song about the suburb Kennedy was living in at the time."

Early in 1986, for two months, Kennedy travelled through the United States and Mexico, while putting the band in hiatus. Upon his return to Australia, Kennedy, Dawson and Turnbull were joined in the studio by Amanda Brown on violin, Sandy Chick on harmony vocals, Cory Messenger on acoustic guitar and Ian Simpson (of Flying Emus) on banjo and pedal steel. They recorded a new single, "Big Country" (July 1986), McFarlane described how "the song captured an authentic country truckin' feel." Also early in 1986, while auditioning for new members of Love Gone Wrong, Kennedy had a casual band with Messenger and Turnbull: John Kennedy's Sweet Dreams. They played country-inspired John Kennedy's Love Gone Wrong originals and covers of popular country songs.

For the Big Country Tour of Australia Kennedy, Messenger and Turnbull were joined by Wayne Connolly on electric guitar and Vincent Sheehan on drums for a new line-up, which visited rural venues outside the major cities. Kennedy acknowledged that "It's very hard to actually get people from the established country music industry in Australia to accept [outsiders], and what they see as alternative bands." Coupe described their typical set list as "mostly Kennedy's songs although they frequently do cover versions of songs by Bob Dylan and The Byrds, from the periods where these artists moved into country-influenced music." Red Eye Records released an eight-track compilation album, From Woe to Go, it covered Kennedy's material since 1984.

In January 1987 Michael Armiger replaced Turnbull on bass guitar and Kennedy shortened the band's name to Love Gone Wrong. He explained "People know who we are now, so I've severed that connection... Love Gone Wrong has a stable line up, and the members are contributing to the writing and the music. We perform mostly my stuff, but it's no longer John Kennedy and backing members." They issued a single, "The Singing City" (September), which was about his birthplace, Liverpool. It was followed by a studio album, Always the Bridegroom, in December on Mighty Boy Records. The Canberra Times' Michael Wellham found it "is country music that avoids the cliches of being done wrong by women and depending on mates with hearts of gold. Intelligent lyrics and music that, while not easily accessible, is still immediate. Neither cattle fodder nor radio fodder." In August 1988 Love Gone Wrong disbanded after Armiger left to join The Johnnys and Kennedy resumed his solo career.

== Solo and other projects ==
In August 1988 John Kennedy flew to Germany and performed at the Berlin Independence Day celebrations. He returned to Australia where he recorded a solo album under the working title One Day (February 1989). The album sessions were abandoned but an associated single, "Out of Town" (January) was released. He undertook the Out of Town Farewell Tour of the nation before moving to the US, then United Kingdom before settling in Berlin. In 1990 Red Eye released a compilation album, Have Songs Will Travel, and in November he toured Australia to promote it.

He returned to Germany, where he formed John Kennedy and the Honeymooners. The line-up included Sven Kuester on drums, Christopher Blenkinsop on bass guitar and accordion, Michael "Moe" Jaksch on double bass and guitar, and Hans Rohe on guitar. The “One Day” album recorded before he left Australia, finally came out on Berlin-based label Twang!/PolyGram under the title Fiction Facing Facts in May 1993. In early 1994 Kennedy moved to Hong Kong, and then in early 1997 he moved to London. Before moving to London 1997 he recorded Kennedy Town, in Berlin using former Honeymooners to record. He moved back to Australia in late 1999.

In the following year he released a retrospective album, Inner West: Greatest Bits and Pieces, rescued from ageing master tapes. Back in Australia Kennedy formed John Kennedy and the Lone Gunmen. Then he formed John Kennedy's '68 Comeback Special in 2003, a band which included former members of Love Gone Wrong.

== Band members ==
JFK & the Cuban Crisis

- John Kennedy – lead vocals, guitar (1980–84)
- James Paterson – guitar, vocals (1980–83)
- Paul Hardman – keyboards
- John Downie – bass guitar
- Stephen Pritchard – drums
- Greg Hall – bass guitar
- Paul Rochelli – drums
- Oscar Beath – bass guitar

John Kennedy's Love Gone Wrong

- John Kennedy – vocals (1984–88)
- Graham Lee – guitar
- Peter Kennard – bass guitar, keyboards
- Peter Timmerman – drums
- Colin Bloxsom – guitar
- Barry Turnbull – bass guitar
- Mark Dawson – drums
- Margaret Labi – harmony vocals
- Cory Messenger – guitar, harmony vocals
- Wayne Connolly – guitar
- Vincent Sheehan – drums
- Michael Armiger – bass guitar

John Kennedy and the Honeymooners

- John Kennedy – lead vocals
- Sven Kuester - drums
- Christopher Blenkinsop – bass guitar, accordion
- Michael "Moe" Jaksch – double bass, guitar
- Hans Rohe – guitar

John Kennedy and the Lone Gunmen

- John Kennedy – lead vocals, guitar
- Steve Broughton – bass guitar
- Jason Walker – guitar
- Osama Mustafa – drums

John Kennedy's '68 Comeback Special

- John Kennedy – lead vocals, guitar
- Peter Timmerman – drums
- Jeff Pope – guitar, dobro, pedal steel
- Glen Pye – harmony vocals, harmonica
- Smithy – bass guitar
- Steve Broughton – bass
- Colin Bloxsom – guitar
- JD Love – guitar
- Murray Cook – guitar
- Megan Heyward – harmony vocals
- Paul Scott - bass
- Phil Hall - bass
- Matt Galvin - guitar
- John Kennedy And The New Originals
- John Kennedy – lead vocals, guitar
- Peter Timmerman – drums
- Murray Cook – guitar
- Phil Hall - bass
- Matt Galvin - guitar

== Discography ==
=== Albums ===
JFK & the Cuban Crisis

- Over the Underpass and Under the Overpass - Cassette album (1981)
- Down and Out in Brisbane and Sydney - Cassette album (1982)
- The End of the Affair (1984) – Waterfront Records (DAMP 6)

John Kennedy's Love Gone Wrong

- From Woe to Go (compilation, October 1986) – Red Eye (RED 11)
- Always the Bridegroom (1987) – Mighty Boy (MBLP 7001)

Solo

- Have Songs Will Travel (compilation, 1990) – Red Eye (RED CD 20, RED MC 20), Furnace
- Fiction Facing Facts (1993) – Twang!/PolyGram (TCD 5900)
- Kennedy Town (2000) – Urban and Western (U&W CD 001), re-released in 2003 on Laughing Outlaw (LORCD 058)
- Inner West: Greatest Bits and Pieces (2001) – Laughing Outlaw (LORCD 023)
- Someone's Dad (2007) – Regal Records
- Is This Not Paris? (2009) – Foghorn Records
- Sons Of Sun (Vol.1) (2011) – Foghorn Records
- Sons Of Sun (Vol.2) (2012) – Foghorn Records
- JFK and the Midlife Crisis (2017) – Popboomerang Records
- Second Best – Greatest Bits Vol.2 (2018) – Foghorn Records
- Raining Treasure – Australian Indie Gold Covers Vol.1 (2019) – Foghorn Records
- Raining Treasure – Australian Indie Gold Covers Vol.2 (2022) – Foghorn Records

John Kennedy and the Honeymooners

- The Honeymooners (1994) - Exile Records

John Kennedy's '68 Comeback Special

- Someone's Dad (2007) – Regal Records
- Is This Not Paris? (2009) – Foghorn Records
- Sons of Sun-Vol.1 (2011) – Foghorn Records
- Sons of Sun-Vol.2 (2012) – Foghorn Records

John Kennedy And The New Originals

- John Kennedy And The New Originals (2023) – Foghorn Records

=== Extended plays ===
JFK & the Cuban Crisis

- Careless Talk Costs Lives (1982) – Waterfront Records (DAMP 1)
- The Ballad of Jackie O (1984) – Waterfront Records (DAMP 4)

John Kennedy and the Honeymooners

- The Honeymooners (1991) Exile (EX 10 EP 7)

=== Singles ===
JFK & the Cuban Crisis

- "Am I a Pagan" (1982) – Two Possibilities

Solo

- "Forget"/"The End of the Affair" (1984) – Waterfront (DAMP 11)
- "Miracle (In Marrickville)"/"Two People" (1985) – Waterfront (DAMP 15)
- "To Love Somebody"/"Tourists in Heaven" (by John Kennedy and Billy Baxter) (1988) – Mighty Boy
- "Out of Town"/"Miracle" (1989) – Mighty Boy

John Kennedy's Love Gone Wrong

- "King Street"/"To Forget" (November 1985) – Red Eye (RED 7)
- "A Time for Giving" (December 1985)
- "Big Country"/"You Brought It All Back To Me" (1986) – Red Eye (RED 10)
- "Run Rudolph Run"/"Rudolph's Talking Christmas Blues" (1986)
- "Singing City"/"Love Gone Wrong" (1987) – Mighty Boy
- "World Upside Down"/"Better Days" (1988) – Mighty Boy
