= Sour Mash =

Sour Mash may refer to:

- Sour mash, a process used in the distilling industry that uses material from an older batch of mash to adjust the acidity of a new mash
- Sour Mash (album), a 1988 album by Beasts of Bourbon
- Sour Mash Records, a record label formed by Noel Gallagher
