= The Bo-Weevils =

Psychedelic rock band

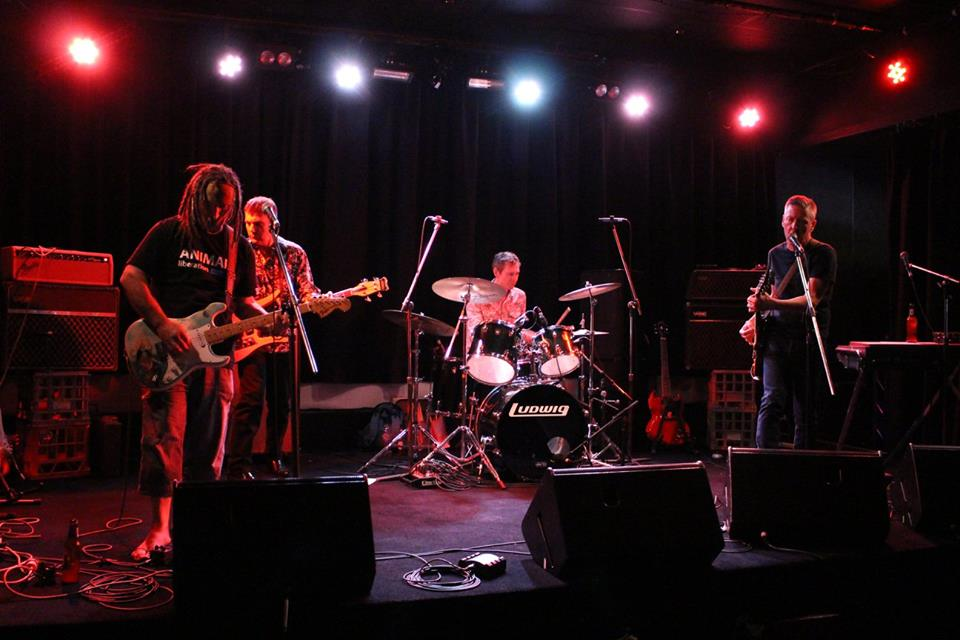
- Reunion gig, 2015

Background information
- Origin: Melbourne, Victoria, Australia
- Genres: Psychedelic rock, pop, garage rock, rock
- Years active: 1985–1999
- Labels: Kavern 7, Mr Spaceman, Rubber, Corduroy, BMG
- Past members: Steve Anderson; Ian Hill; Mark Jenkinson; Neil Rogers; Nino Spadaro; Davern White

The Bo-Weevils are a psychedelic rock band blending psychedelic music, pop music, garage rock and rock music which formed in early 1985. Their early garage incarnation was a lot easier to classify and won fans easily, but the band evolved away from these roots from the late 1980s into more cerebral and accomplished directions. They released four studio albums, Where Particular People Congregate (1988), Destroyer of Worlds (1990), Reap (1992), and Burn (1994) before they semi-retired in 1999. Australian musicologist, Ian McFarlane described the group as "one of the first Australian bands of the 1980s to play wild, 1960s-inspired garage-punk".

== History ==
The Bo-Weevils formed early in 1985 in Melbourne with the line up of Steve Anderson on guitar; Ian Hill on vocals, keyboards, and guitar (ex-Fizzpops, Crackajacks, Olympic Sideburns, Big Fans of Jesus); Mark Jenkinson on drums and Neil Rogers on bass guitar. Australian musicologist, Ian McFarlane described the group as "one of the first Australian bands of the 1980s to play wild, 1960s-inspired garage-punk".

They had a cult following in Australia and Europe during the late 1980s to late 1990s and performed many local shows as well as tours to Sydney, Adelaide and Wellington. The group's work including "Lies", which appeared in August 1986 on Kavern 7 record label's extended play, The Bo-Weevils, and "That Girl" from their single in November, represent their "garage-punk roots". In September that year they recorded a performance at The Tote Hotel, which was issued as Garage Twangin' Retard Rabble Sounds, on cassette later that year.

In April 1987 Anderson was replaced by Nino Spadaro on guitar and vocals; and Hill was replaced by Davern White on keyboards, guitar, and vocals (ex-Undecided). The band issued their next EP, The Vortex Took Them, in March 1988. Their debut studio album, Where Particular People Congregate, appeared in March 1989 on Mr. Spaceman Records. It was co-produced by the band with Kaj Dahlstrom and recorded the previous year in August and September. It was followed by Destroyer of Worlds on Rubber Records in May 1990. McFarlane noted the group were now "stretching out under the influence of Green on Red, the Rain Parade and other roots-rock influenced contemporary American outfits". As noted by Rolling Stone, "The Bo-Weevils remain an integral part of the Aussie scene, with their acclaimed second album helping to cement their legacy"

Elements of the second lineups sound are similar to other contemporary Australian bands, Died Pretty, Hoodoo Gurus, The Stems and The Church although The Bo-Weevils next albums, Reap (October 1992) and Burn (November 1995), were more "straight-ahead, guitar rock releases".

After the release of a compilation album, Trapped in the Garage (December 1996), Hill rejoined the group for a tour early the next year to promote it. In March 1999 The Bo-Weevils undertook their farewell tour and issued another compilation, Get on Down.

In 2007 Off the Hip Records issued a 2× CD compilation album, The Bo-Weevils Anthology.

The Bo-Weevils reformed for a gig at the Northcote Social Club in November 2015 commemorating the 1994 'Burn' album with a remastered CD edition and addition of vinyl tracks from 'Where Particular People Congregate'.

== Other Activities ==
Rogers, Spadaro and White were members of the A.1 Mining Company playing pure 60's garage rock in between other projects.

Hill, Jenkinson and Spadaro formed The Fizzleheads with songwriter James McDonaugh and bassist Theresa Hambrook. They released two albums of alt-pop-rock on Mushroom and Corduroy Records respectively. The second album of 1994 Shoot the Sun was a notably refined and polished effort.

White continued as a founding member of the hard working R'n'B band The Breadmakers.

Rogers has worked as a DJ on Melbourne radio station, 3RRR since 1983. He was later the manager for Cosmic Psychos. In 2008 he was described as a 'doyen' of Australian radio by music journalist, Patrick Donovan of The Age, for his 25 years of hosting The Australian Mood. He plays exclusively Australian acts, and the program's opening theme is "a wild, one-chord exploration that goes on forever" according to Chris Hollow of Sand Pebbles, and was originally recorded by The Bo-Weevils.

== Members ==
- Steve Anderson – guitar, backing vocals (1985–1987)
- Ian Hill – vocals, guitar, organ (1985–1987, 1997)
- Mark Jenkinson – drums, percussion, (1985–1999)
- Neil Rogers – bass guitar (1985–1999)
- Nino Spadaro – guitar, vocals, piano (1987–1999)
- Davern White – vocals, guitar, organ, keyboards, harmonica (1987–1999)

== Discography ==
=== Studio albums ===
- Where Particular People Congregate – (Mr. Spaceman, March 1989) (MRSM 14)
- Destroyer of Worlds – (Rubber, May 1990)
- Reap – (Rubber, October 1992)
- Burn – (Rubber, November 1995)

=== Compilation albums ===
- Trapped in the Garage – (Corduroy, December 1996)
- Get on Down – (Rubber/Zuma, March 1999)
- Anthology – (Off the Hip, August 2007) (OTH 7045)

=== Live albums ===
- Garage Twangin' Retard Rabble Sounds – cassette (1986). Not on Label (DEX 3265)
- If God Was an Astronaut – (Rubber, August 1992). Recorded live at Sing Sing Studios (Melbourne, Australia)

=== Extended plays ===
- The Bo-Weevils – (Kavern 7, August 1986)
- The Vortex Took Them – (Kavern 7, 1987)
- Jay's Song – (Rubber, 1990)
- Into Sunshine – (Rubber, 1994)

=== Singles ===
- "Why in the World" – (1985)
- "That Girl" – (1986)
- "Middle of Nowhere" – (1990)

=== Reviews ===
- "If this band shows influences, it also trandsends 'em and turns them into passing commentary en route to sonic nirvana", Fred Mills, Option Magazine, USA
- "A curious mixture of pop, rock n' roll and some psychedelia sees a complex and accomplished sound from the Bo-Weevils", Ned McDonald, Inpress Magazine, Australia
- "Seems like the only good guitar bands reside half a world away in Australia or New Zealand.... vocalist Davern White can tense his tonsils like Alice Cooper or ease up like Paul Westerberg at his most wistful, and drummer Mark Jenkinson sprinkles cymbal fills and rimshots like they were delicate seasonings...", Gordon Anderson, Option Magazine, USA
- "...when the knife edged guitars come crunching up against a wall of drums the sparks really start to fly..." Phil, Ptolemaic Telescope, UK

=== References ===
General

- McFarlane, Ian (1999). "Whammo Homepage". Encyclopedia of Australian Rock and Pop. St Leonards, NSW: Allen & Unwin. ISBN 1-86508-072-1. Archived from the original on 5 April 2004. Note: Archived [on-line] copy has limited functionality.
- Deeper Water Media, The Bo-Weevils Discography Retrospective (1985-1994)

Specific
