= Beasts of Bourbon =

Australian blues rock band

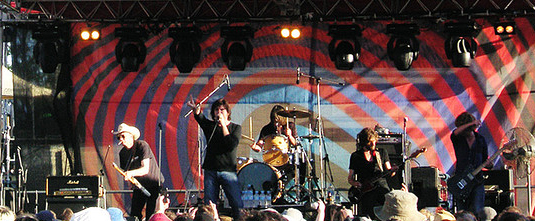
- Beasts of Bourbon at the Big Day Out, Perth, in February 2006

Background information
- Origin: Sydney, New South Wales, Australia
- Genres: Blues rock; swamp rock (early)
- Years active: 1983–1985, 1987–1993, 1996–1997, 2003–2008, 2013–2018, 2019–2025
- Labels: Green/Big Time, Red Eye, Polydor, Universal, Spooky, Alberts, Bang!
- Spinoffs: The Cruel Sea, Kim Salmon and the Surrealists, The Beasts
- Spinoff of: The Scientists, Salamander Jim, Hoodoo Gurus, The Johnnys, The James Baker Experience
- Past members: See "Members"
- Website: myspace.com/beastsofbourbon

Beasts of Bourbon were an Australian blues rock band formed in August 1983, with James Baker on drums (ex-Hoodoo Gurus, The Scientists), Spencer P. Jones on guitar (The Johnnys), Tex Perkins on vocals (Dum Dums), Kim Salmon on guitar and Boris Sujdovic on bass guitar (both ex-The Scientists). Except for mainstays Jones and Perkins, the line-up changed over time as the group splintered and reformed several times. Their debut album, The Axeman's Jazz was released in July 1984. Their debut single, "Psycho", was a cover version of the Leon Payne original. The group disbanded by mid-1985 and each member pursued other musical projects.

They reformed in 1987 and issued a second album, Sour Mash, in December 1988 on Red Eye Records. According to rock music historian, Ian McFarlane, it "virtually redefined the parameters of guitar-based rock'n'roll. The Cramps-influenced swamp-rock of old had been discarded for a more adventurous slab of gutbucket blues and avant-garde weirdness. Perkins' voice had matured into an authentic blues growl". Their fifth studio album, Gone (January 1997), reached the Top 50 ARIA Albums Chart. They released their seventh and final studio album, Little Animals (21 April 2007) on Albert Productions, which also peaked in the Top 50.

== History ==
=== 1983–1985: Beginnings ===
Beasts of Bourbon were formed in August 1983 by vocalist Tex Perkins to fulfil bookings for his previous band, Tex Deadly and the Dum-Dums, and began playing in small Sydney venues. The initial version of the group was James Baker of Hoodoo Gurus on drums, Spencer P. Jones of The Johnnys on guitar, Kim Salmon on guitar and Boris Sudjovic on bass guitar: both of The Scientists. This line-up was featured on the band's first album, The Axeman's Jazz, which was recorded during October 1983 in a single eight-hour session for $100 by Tony Cohen. Also in 1983 Richard Ploog (former member of The Church) joined the band for a short time on drums as a side project. In January 1984 the line-up of Jones, Perkins, Sujdovic, Brett Rixon on drums and Tony Thewlis on guitar (both from The Scientists) played gigs in Perth. In July that year the album was issued on Green Records and according to Australian rock music historian, Ian McFarlane, "it remains a classic of Australian garage/swamp rock. It was the best-selling Australian alternative album for 1984. It also went on to sell over 30000 copies in Europe". A cover of Leon Payne's "Psycho" was issued as a single in July, which was a hit on alternative radio and became the best selling Australia alternative single for 1984. The previous line-up fell apart in March when The Scientists left Australia to tour overseas; fill-ins included Stu Spasm of Lubricated Goat, Zulu Rattle and Salamander Jim on bass guitar; and Brad Shepherd of Hoodoo Gurus on guitar. By early 1985 the line-up of Baker, Perkins, Spasm (now on lead guitar) and Spencer, were joined by Graham Hood (The Johnnys) on bass guitar. Although the album became an underground success, the band was largely a side project for its various members and Beasts of Bourbon disbanded by June that year. Perkins worked with Salamander Jim and various other projects, Jones had The Johnnys, and Salmon and Sujdovic had The Scientists. Baker tried a self-named group, The James Baker Experience, backed by Perkins and Spasm and joined by Roddy Radalj (The Scientists, Hoodoo Gurus) on guitar and vocals. The ensemble released a one-off single in June 1985 and promptly separated.

=== 1988–1993: Sour Mash to The Belly of the Beasts ===
In March 1988 Beasts of Bourbon reconvened after both The Johnnys and The Scientists had disbanded. The line-up of Baker, Jones, Perkins, Salmon and Sujdovic recorded Sour Mash with audio engineer and producer, Phil Punch (The Mexican Spitfires). The album appeared in December on Red Eye Records, with McFarlane declaring that it "virtually redefined the parameters of guitar-based rock'n'roll. The Cramps-influenced swamp-rock of old had been discarded for a more adventurous slab of gutbucket blues and avant-garde weirdness. Perkins' voice had matured into an authentic blues growl". Allmusic's Skip Jansen found "[a] raw blues-rock album with post-punk afflictions ... dream come true for fans of the Australian rock and garage punk ... [with] the blistering slide-guitar-driven sound, the band does a fine job of re-creating the sound of a twisted night out at the pub". Their cover of "Hard Work Drivin' Man" (original by Ry Cooder and Jack Nitzsche) was issued as a single in November, which became a number-one independent hit single. In August 1989 they followed up with another independent number-one single, "Hate Inside", which was written by Jones and Perkins. By that time, Perkins was also performing irregularly as a member of The Cruel Sea.

Beasts of Bourbon toured Europe and then released a third album, Black Milk, in July 1990. Jansen was disappointed "it pales by comparison to the two previous albums" although it was "a fine album of lurching blues-driven rock". In Germany they issued a non-album single, "You Let Me Down" / "Blanc Garçon", the tracks appeared on the German version of the album, Jansen felt these "two cuts surpass anything on [Black Milk]". By February 1991, Baker and Sujdovic were replaced by Brian Henry Hooper on bass guitar and Tony Pola on drums – both from Salmon's new band, The Surrealists. Beasts of Bourbon undertook their Kick Arse Australian tour. The line-up of Hooper, Jones, Perkins, Pola and Salmon recorded the group's fourth album, The Low Road, with Tony Cohen producing. McFarlane saw it was "brimming with urgency, surrealism, atmosphere, myth, illusion and honesty, but above all, hard-nosed rock riffs". While Jansen described their "straighter, less garage punk sound" although "it proved a little tough to get the live energy of a performance to tape". The Low Road featured "Chase the Dragon" – which relates to heroin smuggling – a "blistering ... nefarious delight".

Beasts of Bourbon performed at the inaugural Big Day Out Sydney concert in January 1992 and followed with another tour of Europe. In January 1993 a double album of live tracks and rarities, The Belly of the Beasts - Live '91 & '92 and Shit We Didn't Put Out the First Time, was issued to celebrate the group's tenth anniversary. Also in '93 came the sheet music songbook Ten Years Behind Bars, which boasted an introduction by Clinton Walker. The band played the second Big Day Out in 1994, which had expanded into a series of concerts to four Australian capital cities, and then toured Europe again. Following the tour, Salmon – with Hooper and Pola – left the group to concentrate on The Surrealists while Perkins focused on The Cruel Sea, which was achieving success with their album The Honeymoon Is Over (May 1993). Jones joined various projects and released his debut solo album, Rumour of Death (November 1994).

=== 1996–2012: Later years ===
In September 1996, Beasts of Bourbon reformed with Hooper, Jones, Perkins and Pola joined by former Divinyls' member Charlie Owen – also in Tex, Don and Charlie with Perkins – on guitar. In January 1997 they released Gone prior to another appearance on the Big Day Out series. The album reached the ARIA Albums Chart Top 50. Gone received lukewarm reviews, but produced a single, "Saturated". The group's 1997 live performance at the Esplanade Hotel was recorded – five tracks appeared as a bonus disc on their 1999 compilation, Beyond Good and Evil. However, by the end of 1997 the group had dissolved again.

In late 2003, they reformed and recorded a live album, Low Life, which was released on Spooky Records in August 2005. In 2006, they reformed to play in the Big Day Out around Australia and New Zealand. In late December 2006, Albert Productions signed an exclusive worldwide recording deal with the band, and they released a new album, Little Animals, on 21 April 2007. Perkins declared "Alberts label releases have been a huge influence on the Beasts of Bourbon, so to be signed to this legendary label is not only a great honour and the start of an exciting new chapter in the bands history, it feels like... destiny". The album peaked in the Top 50. The group played with Australian bands and artists at the Rockin' for Rights concert, which protested the Workchoices legislation. In April 2008 after a show in Berlin the group cancelled their remaining tour dates and ended the band.

In 2012 the group announced plans to reunite the original line-up for a one-off gig at the 2013 Australian All Tomorrow's Parties music festival in mid-February. In January 2013 Jones worked in his band, Nothing Butts, with Baker and The Drones' members Gareth Liddiard and Fiona Kitschin; while Perkins fronts Tex Perkins & the Apes with Gus Agars (Dark Horses with Perkins) on drums and Raúl Sánchez (Magic Dirt) on guitar.

=== 2013–present: 30th anniversary and The Beasts ===
In August 2013, Beasts of Bourbon played a series of shows in Sydney and Melbourne to celebrate their first 30 years. The three shows in each city featured alternate lineups for each night with James Baker and Tony Pola sharing drumming, Boris Sujdovic and Brian Hooper swapping as bass player and Kim Salmon and Charlie Owen rotating on guitar. As it has been for the history of the band, Jones and Perkins are the only persistent members. A triple live album 30 Years On Borrowed Time was released to coincide with the live shows.

The group returned in 2019 with the name of The Beasts. The name change was made out of respect for Spencer P. Jones and Brian Hooper, who both died in 2018. The band released a new album Still Here which included contributions from Jones before his death. The band completed an Australian tour in November and December 2019 with Adalita in support. The line up for the tour was Tex Perkins, Charlie Owen, Tony Pola, Kim Salmon and Boris Sujdovic. In December 2020, The Beasts Of Bourbon were listed at number 42 in Rolling Stone Australia's "50 Greatest Australian Artists of All Time" issue.

In May 2023, The Beasts announced two shows under the banner of "The Beasts Be Suburban" to celebrate the 40th anniversary of Beasts of Bourbon's formation.

== Members ==
- Spencer P. Jones – guitar, backing vocals (1983–1985, 1988–1993, 1996–1997, 2003–2008, 2013; died 2018)
- Tex Perkins – lead vocals (1983–1985, 1988–1993, 1996–1997, 2003–2008, 2013, 2019-2025)
- Boris Sujdovic – bass guitar (1983–1985, 1988–1990, 2013, 2019-2025)
- James Baker – drums (1983–1984, 1984–1985, 1988–1990, 2013, 2023-2025; died 2025)
- Kim Salmon – guitar, harmonica, backing vocals, slide guitar (1983–1984, 1988–1993, 2013, 2019-2025)
- Brett Rixon – drums (1984; died 1993)
- Tony Thewlis – guitar (1984)
- Graham Hood – bass guitar (1984–1985)
- Stu Spasm – guitar (1984–1985)
- Brian Henry Hooper – bass guitar (1990–1993, 1996–1997, 2003–2008, 2013; died 2018)
- Tony Pola – drums (1990–1993, 1996–1997, 2003–2008, 2013, 2019-2021; died 2021)
- Charlie Owen – guitar (1996–1997, 2003–2008, 2013, 2019-2025)

== Discography ==
=== Studio albums ===
List of studio albums, with selected chart positions
Title	Album details	Peak chart positions
Title	Album details	AUS
The Axeman's Jazz	Released: July 1984; Label: Green/Big Time (BT 7032); Format: LP, cassette	—
Sour Mash	Released: December 1988; Label: Red Eye Records (REDLP 5); Format: LP, CD, cassette	—
Black Milk	Released: July 1990; Label: Red Eye Records, Polydor (REDLP 12); Format: LP, CD, cassette	142
The Low Road	Released: December 1991; Label: Red Eye Records, Polydor (REDLP 26); Format: LP, CD, cassette	85
Gone	Released: December 1996; Label: Red Eye Records, Polydor (REDCD 58); Format: CD, cassette	49
Little Animals	Released: 21 April 2007; Label: Albert Productions (88697092052); Format: CD, download	44
Still Here (as The Beasts)	Released: 2019; Label: Bang! Records (BANG!-CD128); Format: CD, download	—
Ultimo (as The Beasts)	Released: 2024; Label: The Beasts; Format: LP, download	—

=== Live albums ===
List of live albums, with selected chart positions
Title	Album details	Peak chart positions
Title	Album details	AUS
From the Belly of the Beasts	Released: January 1993; Label: Red Eye Records, Polydor (RED LP 30); Format: LP, cassette	85
Low Life	Released: August 2005; Label: Red Eye Records, Polydor (SPOOKY017); Format: CD, download	—
30 Years on Borrowed Time	Released: 2013; Label: Bang! Records (BANG!-LP78); Format: LP, download	—

=== Compilation album ===
List of compilations
Title	Album details
Beyond Good & Evil – The Best of The Beasts of Bourbon	Released: 1999; Label: Red Eye Records (547947-2); Format: CD

=== Extended plays ===
List of EPs, with selected chart positions
Title	EP details	Peak chart positions
Title	EP details	AUS
Just Right	Released: January 1992; Label: Red Eye Records, Polydor (865 191-2); Format: LP, cassette	121
