= The Spoils (band) =

Australian band

The Spoils are an Australian band from Melbourne, consisting of Sean Simmons and Bronwyn Henderson, who are known for their dark urban balladry and side-show themed vignettes.

== History ==
The Spoils (previously called The Losing End) was formed towards the end of the 20th century in St Kilda, Victoria. In 2001, they released their first album, Hurtsville, which reached number four in the Australian independent charts. In 2003, The Spoils traveled to Brisbane and settled on a northern postcode, later returning in 2005 to release their second album, Goodnight Victoria.

After touring Goodnight Victoria, including performances at the 2006 and 2007 Queenscliff Music Festival, The Famous Spiegeltent and The Age Writers Festival as well as a tour of New Zealand, The Spoils released "The Spell" single and toured Europe for the first time, going to Germany, France, Czech Republic and Spain.

In 2008, The Spoils returned to New Zealand and Europe.

They released a third album in 2009 followed by a tour of Europe, New Zealand and Australia.

== Discography ==
- Hurtsville (2001)
- Goodnight Victoria (2005)
- The Crook, The Cloak & The Maiden (2009) - Stomp
