= Kim Salmon =

Australian rock musician

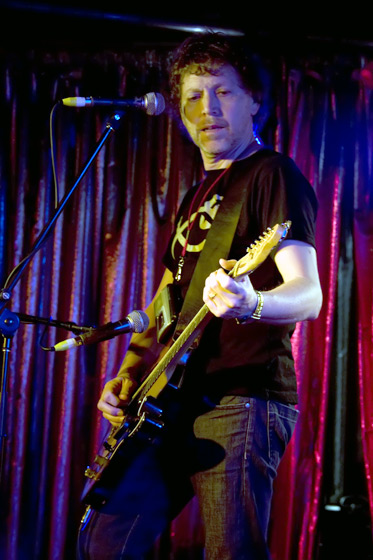
- Salmon performing with the Surrealists, Ding Dong Lounge, Melbourne, 2008

Background information
- Born: Kim Leith Salmon; 24 January 1957 (age 69); Bunbury, Western Australia, Australia
- Origin: Perth, Western Australia, Australia
- Genres: Indie rock, swamp rock, punk blues, grunge
- Occupation: Singer-songwriter
- Instruments: Vocals, guitar, banjo
- Years active: 1976–present
- Labels: Citadel, Shock, Half a Cow, Carrot Top, Mushroom, Polydor, MGM
- Website: kimsalmon.com.au

Kim Leith Salmon (born 24 January 1957) is an Australian rock musician and songwriter from Perth. He has worked in various groups including the Scientists, Beasts of Bourbon, Kim Salmon and the Surrealists, Kim Salmon and the Business, and Darling Downs. Australian rock musicologist, Ian McFarlane, described Salmon as one of the first Australians to "embrace wholeheartedly the emergent punk phenomenon of the mid-to-late 1970s" with The Scientists. He declared that Beasts of Bourbon were "masters of uncompromising gutbucket blues and hard-edged rock'n'roll". In 2004 Salmon was inducted into the West Australian Music Industry Association Hall of Fame and in 2007, into the Music Victoria Awards Hall of Fame.

== Early work ==
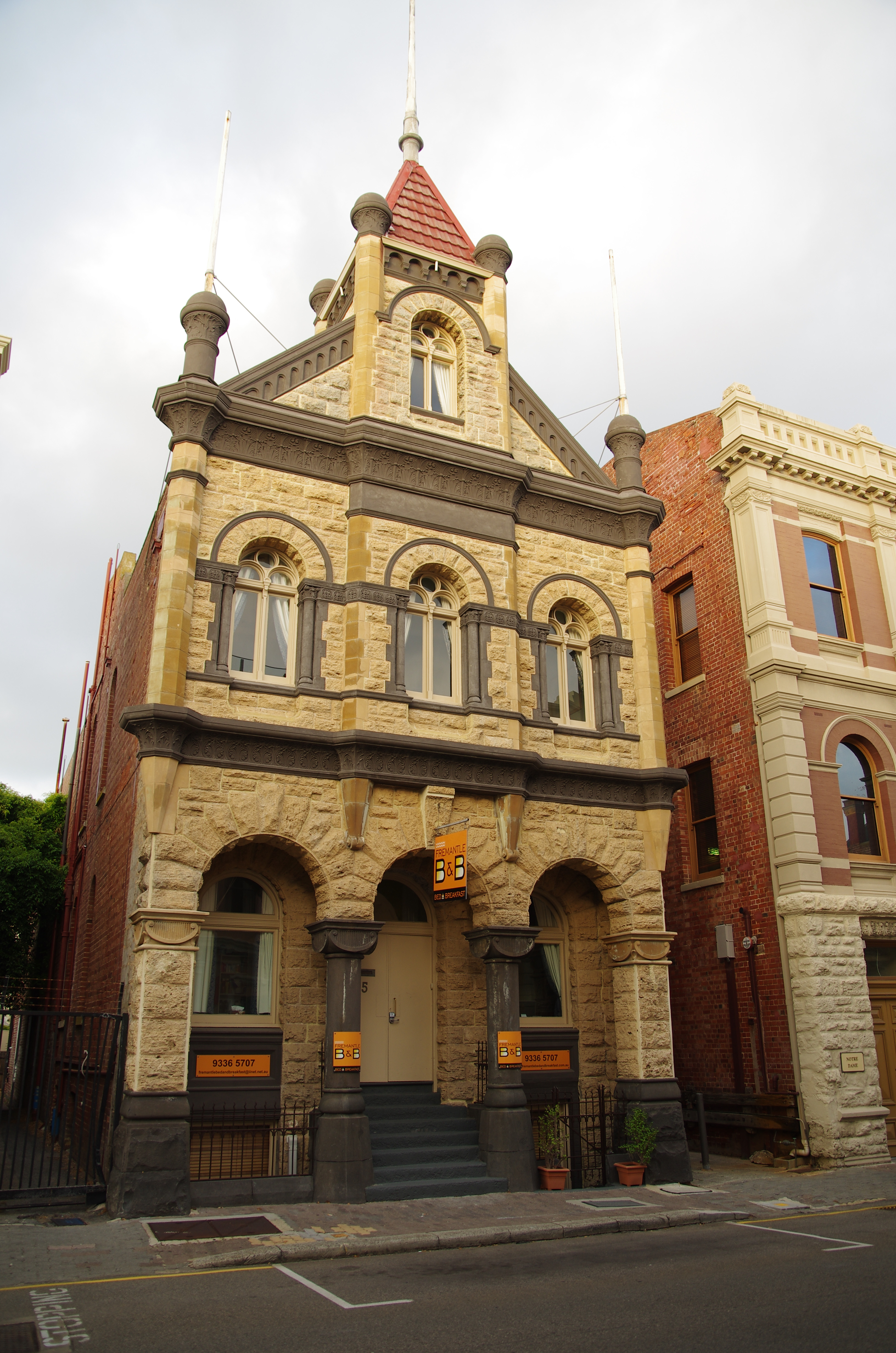
Tarantella Night Club in Fremantle, where Salmon resided and made his first live performances

Kim Leith Salmon was born in 1957 in the Western Australian port city of Bunbury. He later recalled wanting to be a nuclear physicist until, at the age of 13, he heard "heavy rock stuff" on the radio. He bought his first guitar, "an acoustic steel string thing", for A$14 and taught himself to play "Black Night" and "Tobacco Road". By the age of 18 Salmon had started a fine arts course at a university but deferred after a year, "I didn't really fit in with it". At the age of 19 he was a member of Troubled Waters, a cabaret covers band playing in a Fremantle strip club.

In August 1976 with Salmon on lead vocals and lead guitar, he formed Perth's first punk band, The Cheap Nasties. His early influences include The Modern Lovers' self-titled album (1976), New York Dolls, and The Stooges. Salmon recruited his high school mates: Mark Betts on drums; Dan Dare on bass guitar; Neil Fernandez on guitar; and Robert Porritt on vocals. After Salmon left in December 1977 they were renamed The Manikins.

By early 1978 Salmon had joined The Exterminators replacing Mark Demetrius on lead vocals. Fellow members were John Dowlings on drums; Roddy Radalj on guitar and vocals; and Boris Sujdovic on bass guitar. The group were renamed The Invaders, and in May 1978 James Baker replaced Dowlings on drums (ex-Geeks, Beheaded, The Victims). They changed their name to The Scientists and in August Sujdovic left. He was eventually replaced by Dennis Byrne on bass guitar in January 1979.

The line up of Salmon, Baker, Byrne and Radalj recorded their debut single, "Frantic Romantic", which appeared in June that year. It was co-written by Salmon and Baker. However Byrne and Radalj had already left in April and were replaced by Ian Sharples on bass guitar and Ben Juniper on guitar. In December 1979 and in February and March 1980, as a member of The Scientists, Salmon toured the eastern states of Australia and they appeared on TV pop music series, Countdown.

They had issued their debut extended play, The Scientists, in February: Australian musicologist, Ian McFarlane, described the single and EP as "one of the most collectable artefacts of the Australian punk rock era". Further line up changes occurred with Salmon, Baker and Sharples recording a studio album of the same name in January 1981. The group broke up and Salmon formed a briefly existing group, Louie Louie, with Brett Rixon on drums (ex-Screaming Fits), and Kim Williams on bass guitar. By August that year Louie Louie had disbanded and The Scientists album was released by EMI. McFarlane felt that Salmon was one of the first Australians to "embrace wholeheartedly the emergent punk phenomenon of the mid-to-late 1970s".

== The Scientists in Sydney and United Kingdom ==
In September 1981 Salmon and Sujdovic, with Rixon on drums and Tony Thewlis (ex-Helicopters) on guitar, reformed The Scientists and moved to Sydney. McFarlane noted that the Sydney line up had "dropped the melodic, punky power pop of old for a more malevolent, psychedelic-tinged neo-rock'n'roll". By December 1982 they had issued another single, "This Is My Happy Hour". In September the following year they released another EP, Blood Red River, which was an influential record of the post-punk era. In March 1984 the group toured the United Kingdom and Europe playing an amalgamation of blues, punk and noise. The Scientists remained in the UK and went through several further incarnations, with Salmon remaining as the sole constant member, before the band returned to Australia in early 1987 and broke up again late that year.

Salmon's work with The Scientists in the 1980s influenced grunge music, which rose to prominence around Seattle, United States, before impacting on popular music in the early 1990s. The Scientists relied on unorthodox bass-heavy rhythms and distorted guitars, the latter being a direct precursor to grunge. The term grunge was used by Salmon in the mid-1980s to describe The Scientists' sound, which he recalled for the audience in an Australian Broadcasting Corporation documentary series on Australian music, Long Way to the Top, Episode 6: "Gathering of the Tribes 1984-2000" on 12 September 2001. Everett True writing for The Guardian in 2011 disputed that Seattle was the origin of the genre, "[t]here's more of an argument to be had for grunge beginning in Australia with the Scientists and their scrawny punk ilk".

== The Surrealists and Beasts of Bourbon ==
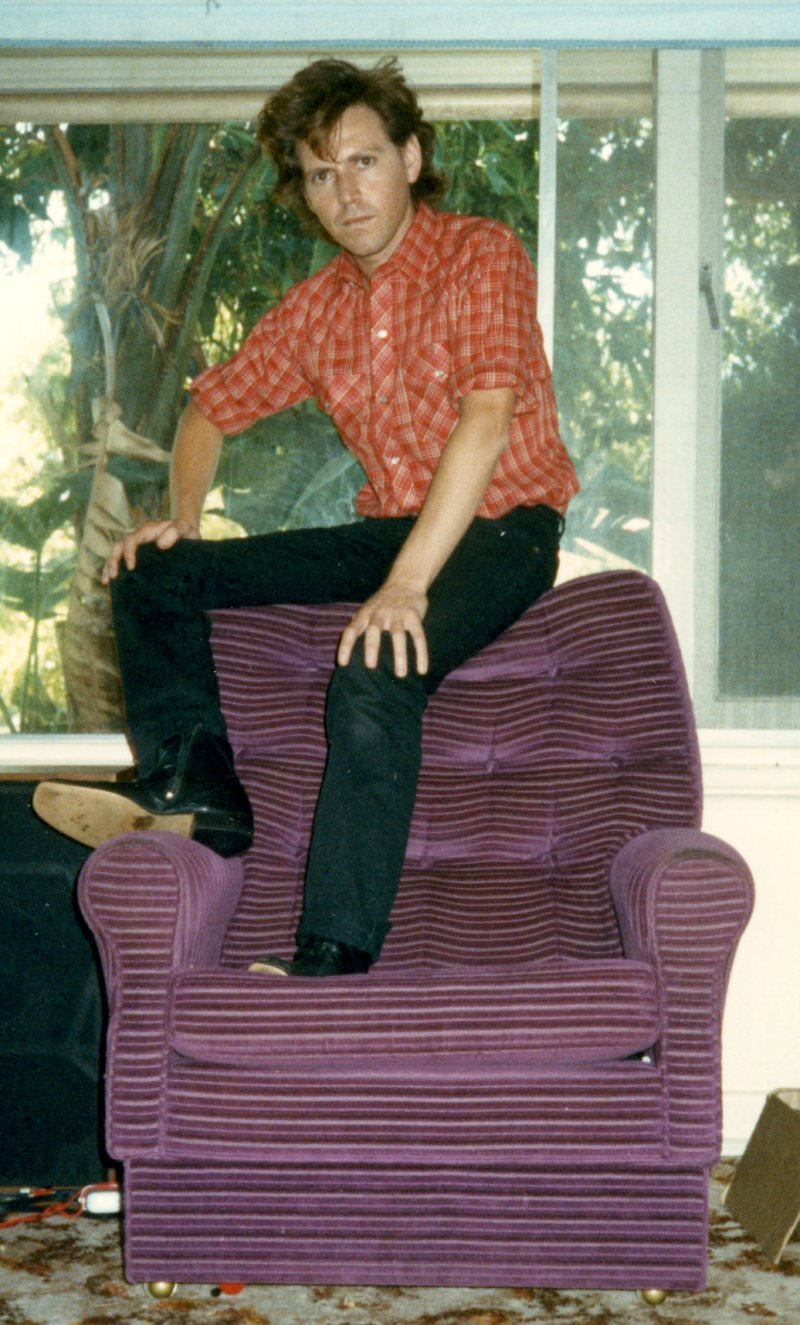
Kim Salmon at home in Perth, January 1989

In August 1983 while still a member of The Scientists, Salmon on guitar joined Beasts of Bourbon as a side project alongside old bandmates Baker and Sudjovic; with Spencer P. Jones on guitar (of The Johnnys); and Tex Perkins on vocals (ex-Tex Deadly and the Dum-Dums). In October that year they recorded the group's debut album, The Axeman's Jazz (July 1984). In February 1984 Salmon and Perkins formed Salamander Jim with Richard Ploog on drums (also in The Church), however by the following month Salmon had returned to his commitments with The Scientists.

During The Scientists 1987 tour of Australia Salmon formed Kim Salmon and the Surrealists in Perth as an indie pop group. Fellow founders were Brian Henry Hooper on bass guitar and Tony Pola on drums. Their first two albums, Hit Me with the Surreal Feel (October 1988) and Just Because You Can't See It ... Doesn't Mean It Isn't There (February 1990), were described by McFarlane as having a "dark, confrontational sound powered by Salmon's scratchy, neurotic guitar and snarling vocals". Also in 1990 Salmon issued his debut solo single, "Lightning Scary", which appeared on the Surrealists third album, Essence, in September of the following year.

From March 1988 Beasts of Bourbon reconvened and Salmon spent time with both groups over the subsequent five years. By February 1991 Hooper and Pola had replaced Sudjovic and Baker respectively as members of Beasts of Bourbon. In 1993 after touring Australia and Europe with Beasts of Bourbon Salmon, Hooper and Pola left the group to concentrate on the Surrealists. McFarlane declared Beasts of Bourborn were "masters of uncompromising gutbucket blues and hard-edged rock'n'roll".

In July 1994 Salmon issued an album, Hey Believer, with backing band STM (Sexually Transmitted Music) featuring Warren Ellis on violin and Jim White on drums (both future Dirty Three members), and Andrew Entsch on double bass. Also that year Salmon released a solo live cassette album, Hookline and Singer, available at his gigs.

The Surrealists line up changed as members left - Greg Bainbridge joined on drums in 1994 and Stu Thomas joined on bass in 1995. Micheal Redman and Leon De Bruin were the brass section for The Surrealists in 1998–9. Later, Phil Collings took on The Surrealists drum duties, and is the current drummer as at 2020.

== Antenna, and then The Business ==
Early in 1998 Salmon on lead vocals and guitar formed Antenna in Sydney as a collaboration with Dave Faulkner on lead vocals and guitar (ex-The Victims, The Manikins, Hoodoo Gurus); Justin Frew on guitar and Stuart McCarthy on guitar (both from Southend). In November that year Antenna issued their debut album, Installation, and single, "Come on Spring". According to McFarlane, the single had an "electronic undertow balanced by an irresistible melody"; while the album was an "eclectic, diverse and challenging mix of electronica, breezy pop, throbbing bass, washes of guitar and keyboards, and dance floor grooves". Antenna performed on the Big Day Out tour early in 1999 and then disbanded.

Salmon's next band, Kim Salmon and the Business, formed in mid-1999 with Stu Thomas on bass guitar, Greg Bainbridge on drums, Leon de Bruin on trumpet, and Michael Redman on saxophone and flute – all were latter day members of the Surrealists. Other subsequent members were Ben Grant on sax, Damian Maughan on trumpet, Tarek Smallman on drums and sampler, Paul Williamson on trumpet, Rob Jackson on sax, and Phil Collings on drums. The group's first album, Record, was released on 25 October 1999. McFarlane felt it is "one of Salmon's strongest to date, full of diverse and soulful pop". It was Feature Album of the Week on Triple J.

The lead single, "Saving Me from Me", appeared ahead of the album on 20 September 1999. Other tracks on the single are "Caesar's Lament", and a cover of Dudley Moore's "Love Me", from the feature film, Bedazzled (1967). Late in 1999 the Business toured Australia promoting the album and debut single. A second single, "Disconnected", released on 13 March 2000 included two remixes by Mr Chill, Gary B and Justin Frew. The group toured to promote that single.

== Darling Downs and SALMON ==
Some of Kim Salmon's later work has reflected a quieter style. In 2002 he released an acoustic solo album, E(a)rnest, where he used a Yamaha G55 and spent 18 months recording it in his own studio. He then commenced a country music group, Darling Downs, with former Died Pretty singer, Ron Peno. Their debut album, How Can I Forget This Heart of Mine?, was released in 2005. It appeared in the US market in May 2006 and Dan Raper of PopMatters noted "these are subtle, slow-hitting songs. They're not insignificant, but they are certainly quirky" although the album "could reward you, but not right away, and it's riddled with tics and mannerisms that are almost purposefully thrown in to turn you away".

In June 2004 Salmon was inducted into the West Australian Music Industry Association's newly established Hall of Fame. Salmon had been enrolled onto the WAM Rock 'n' Roll of Renown in 1994. Darling Downs' second album, From one to Another, appeared on 15 October 2007, which Michael Berick of Allmusic found was "mining a spare, simple acoustic Americana sound that basically consists of Peno's rural twang and Salmon's picking on a banjo or guitar".

In September 2004 Kim Salmon formed an instrumental group consisting of two drummers and six guitarists, SALMON. The band included Clare Moore and Michael Stranges on drums; and Dave Graney, Ash Naylor, Penny Ikinger, Matt Walker and Anton Ruddick on guitar. Kim Salmon played guitar and a sampler. Stu Thomas later replaced Naylor for live shows and a for TV performance on ABCTV's "Spicks and Specks" show. The band released an album, Rock Formations, in May 2007 on both CD and as a limited double LP – only 500 copies were pressed. The first half of the album is made up of tracks recorded at rehearsal and the second half recorded live at the Metro in Sydney. I-94 Bar's reviewer T J Honeysuckle was impressed by "a crack team of Melbourne based musicians kicking it out, letting it out of their systems, with an air of abandonment and glee permeating each and every track". Fellow reviewer at the website Patrick Emery felt it was "a grab bag of neo-70s riffs, screeching vocals (albeit computer generated) and iconic rock theatrics".

== Reformations and other works ==
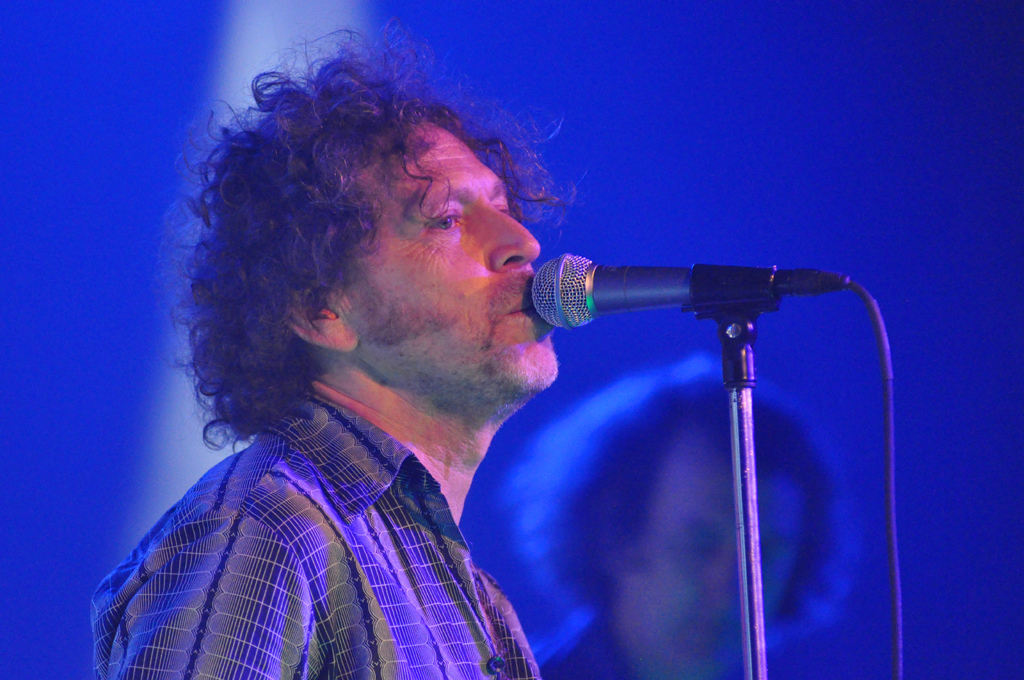
Salmon with The Scientists at All Tomorrow's Parties in Monticello in September 2010.

In August 2011 Kim Salmon wrote an article, "Spare a Dollar for the Maker, Music Doesn't Play Itself", for The Age, to raise awareness of the financial problems of local musicians with live venues closing and being underpaid. In July 2013 Dan Cass of The Guardian described Salmon providing guitar tuition, "[h]e shows me licks, and explains the basics of musical theory".

In September 2013 Salmon recalled "a whole lot of what I do is tied up in my past. The Scientists, The Beasts of Bourbon, The Surrealists. This is great, but I still like to make new stuff. I've kept my sanity over the years by doing new stuff and waiting for it to become old enough to be revived". He described how The Surrealists reformed in 2006, for a one-off concert at Azkena Festival, Spain. The Scientists also reunited in 2006 and recorded their performance at Shepherd's Bush, which was issued as a live album, Sedition in the following year.

In 2010 The Surrealists line up of Salmon, Stu Thomas and Phil Collings on drums, released a studio album, Grand Unifying Theory. Ned Raggett of Allmusic found "it's more focused on the sharply brawling side of his work than some of the quieter recent efforts, this is still an album that showcases tense moments and arrangements throughout".

In 2012 he teamed with Spencer P Jones (both ex-Beasts of Bourbon) which resulted in The Runaways (February 2013). Darling Downs' third album, In the Days When the World Was Wide, appeared in July 2013. Aaron Curran for Mess+Noise noted that it "harkens back to the lost opportunities of youth, but in a fond and measured way filled with peaceful resignation rather than caustic regret". It was followed by a reformation of Beasts of Bourbon which recorded a live album, 30 Years on Borrowed Time (August 2013).

== Personal life ==
Kim Salmon co-wrote "Tiger Tiger" (1982), "Blood Red River" (1983) and "Murderess In A Purple Dress" with his then-girlfriend, Linda Fearon. Salmon and Fearon later married. By 1991 the couple had two sons, Alex and Jack (born 1 November 1990, Sydney). Salmon wrote "Desensitised" on The Surrealists album, Sin Factory (May 1993), about his younger son, Jack. Salmon, Fearon and Brett Woodward formed Bloody Stupid Productions which provided a music video for "Lightning Scary". The couple were separated by 1994. Fearon had provided the cover photography for Hey Believer (July 1994) by Kim Salmon with STM.

By August 2005 Salmon was married again and had two more children, another son and a daughter.

A biography of his life was released in 2019, called Nine Parts Water, One Part Sand: Kim Salmon and the Formula For Grunge.

== Television Performances ==
On 16 July 1997 Kim performed on the RMITV show Under Melbourne Tonight.

== Discography ==
Kim Salmon is credited with: guitars (lead, slide, acoustic, bass), vocals, banjo, zither, jaw-harp, percussion, producer, audio mastering.

=== Albums ===
Kim Salmon and the Surrealists

- Hit Me With The Surreal Feel
- Just Because You Can't See It Doesn't Mean It Isn't There
- Essence
- Sin Factory
- Kim Salmon and The Surrealists
- Ya Gotta Let Me Do My Thing – Half a Cow Records (HAC 63) (1996)
- Grand Unifying Theory – Low Transit Industries (2010)

Kim Salmon with STM (Sexually Transmitted Music)

- Hey Believer – Red Eye/Polydor (RED CD 40/523 052–2) (1994)

Kim Salmon (solo)

- Hookline and Singer – (live album, 1994)
- E(a)rnest – Independent/MGM Distribution (ERNST01) (2002)
- Wall/Paper Ecstatic Peace! – (2004)
- My Script – (2015)

Antenna

- Installation – Mushroom Records (MUSH33155.2) (1998)

Kim Salmon and the Business

- Record – Half a Cow Records (HAC 86) (1999)

Darling Downs

- How Can I Forget This Heart of Mine – (2005)
- From one to Another – (2007)
- In the Days When the World Was Wide – (July 2013)

Salmon

- Rock Formations – (2007)

Kim Salmon and the Guys from Mudhoney

- Until... – (2010)

Kim Salmon and Spencer P. Jones

- Runaways – (February 2013)

=== Extended plays ===
Kim Salmon and the Surrealists

- You're Such A Freak – Half a Cow Records (HAC 68) (1997)

Kim Salmon and the Business

- I'll Be Around: Escobar Remix – Half a Cow Records (HAC 95) (2000)

=== Singles ===
Kim Salmon (solo)

- "Lightning Scary" – (1986)

Kim Salmon and the Surrealists

- "I Fell" – (1993)
- "Fix Me Up" – (1996)
- "I Won't Tell / The World Of Love" – (1996)
- "The Zipper" – (1997)

Antenna

- "Come on Spring" – (1998)

Kim Salmon and the Business

- "Saving Me from Me" – (1999)
- "Disconnected" – (2000)

== Awards and nominations ==
=== The Age EG Awards ===
The Age EG Awards are an annual awards night celebrating Victorian music. They commenced in 2005.

Year	Nominee / work	Award	Result
2007	Kim Salmon	Hall Of Fame	inductee

=== West Australian Music Industry Awards ===
The West Australian Music Industry Awards are annual awards celebrating achievements for Western Australian music. They commenced in 1985.

Year	Nominee / work	Award	Result
1994	Kim Salmon	Rock 'n' Roll of Renown	inductee
