= The Scientists =

Rock band from Perth, Western Australia

Background information
- Also known as: Exterminators, Invaders
- Origin: Perth, Western Australia, Australia
- Genres: Alternative rock, post-punk, noise rock, swamp rock, punk blues, garage punk, power pop (early)
- Years active: 1978–1987, 1995, 2007–present
- Labels: D.N.A. Records, White Rider Records, EMI Custom Records, Au Go Go Records, Big Time Records
- Members: Kim Salmon; Boris Sujdovic; Tony Thewlis
- Past members: Leanne Cowie (deceased); James Baker (deceased); Roddy Radalj; Denis Byrne; Ben Juniper; Ian Sharples; Brett Rixon (deceased); Richard Hertz; Joe Presedo; Nick Combe

The Scientists are a rock band from Perth, Western Australia, led by Kim Salmon, initially known as the Exterminators and then the Invaders. The band had two primary incarnations: the Perth-based punk band of the late 1970s and the Sydney/London-based swamp rock band of the 1980s.

In October 2010, Blood Red River (1983) was included in the list in the book 100 Best Australian Albums.

== History ==
=== 1976–1977: formation ===
Kim Salmon had formed a punk band, the Cheap Nasties, in August 1976. He left in December 1977 and the remainder, with Robbie Porritt joining as lead vocalist, continued as the Manikins. Salmon replaced Mark Demetrius in the Exterminators, who then became known as the Invaders. The lineup included Roddy Radalj (guitar, vocals), Boris Sujdovic (bass) and John Rowlings (drums).

=== 1978–1981: Perth ===
The Invaders became the Scientists in May 1978, when James Baker from the Victims replaced Rowlings. Sujdovic left the band in August 1978 (later recording with the Rockets). The songwriting partnership that ensued, with Baker writing lyrics which Salmon would put to music, naturally favoured a melodic, pop-infused style of punk.

The Scientists

The band started playing again in January 1979 with Dennis Byrne on bass. This lineup recorded the band's first single, "Frantic Romantic"/"Shake (Together Tonight)", released in June 1979 on the D.N.A. Records label.

Radalj and Byrne left in April 1979, replaced by Ben Juniper (guitar) and Ian Sharples (bass). This lineup recorded the band's second release, The Scientists EP (released February 1980 by White Rider Records) and did two tours of Melbourne and Sydney, in December 1979 and February/March 1980. In Melbourne, the band appeared on pop TV show Countdown, performing "Last Night" from the EP.

Juniper left the band in May 1980, and Salmon, Baker and Sharples continued as a trio. The band broke up in January 1981 after recording their debut album, The Scientists (commonly referred to as The Pink Album), released in August 1981 by EMI Custom Records. In Sydney, Baker had joined Radalj to form Le Hoodoo Gurus with Dave Faulkner (ex-the Victims) and Kimble Rendall in January 1981.

Salmon then formed Louie Louie with Kim Williams (bass) and Brett Rixon (drums), though this band broke up in August 1981.

=== 1982–1987: Sydney and London ===
In September 1981, Salmon and Sujdovic reformed the band, with Rixon on drums and Tony Thewlis (ex-Helicopters) on guitar, and prepared to move to Sydney. For this version of the band, the musical direction of the band turned more towards swampy, psychedelic-tinged rock and roll, incorporating the influence of bands such as The Gun Club, the Cramps, Suicide, the Stooges and Captain Beefheart.

The band was signed by Au Go Go Records, who released "This Is My Happy Hour"/"Swampland" (December 1982), the influential Blood Red River mini-LP (September 1983) and "We Had Love"/"Clear Spot" (December 1983).

By the end of 1983, the Scientists were one of the most popular Australian independent bands. Deciding to move on to new horizons, they left Australia and relocated to London in March 1984. In October 1984, the band supported the Gun Club on their European tour. Meanwhile, Au Go Go had issued the darker, harsher mini-album This Heart Doesn't Run on Blood, This Heart Doesn't Run on Love (September 1984).

The band released a 12" EP, Demolition Derby, in Belgium in February 1985, and their first full overseas album Produced by The Fall and Birthday Party producer, Richard Mazda, You Get What You Deserve, in the UK in July 1985 on their manager's Karbon label, followed by the "You Only Live Twice"/"If It's The Last Thing I Do" 7" in September. Owing to contractual disputes with Au Go Go, different mixes of some tracks appeared in Australia as the mini-album Atom Bomb Baby, with the "Atom Bomb Baby/Backwards Man" 7" and a compilation LP Heading For a Trauma (comprising Demolition Derby with rare, radio and live tracks) being released with it in July 1985.

Rixon left the band in February 1985 to be replaced by Phillip Hertz, who was replaced in December 1985 by Leanne Chock. The band signed a new deal with Big Time Records, who asked them to prepare a best-of compilation to introduce them to the market. The band rerecorded 11 of their songs with producer Richard Mazda as Weird Love, released in April 1986.

Sujdovic had to leave the UK after the recording due to visa problems and was replaced by Joe Presedo of Silver Chapter. Presedo and Chock left in December 1986, Salmon shifted to bass and Nick Combe joined on drums. The Salmon/Thewlis/Combe lineup recorded the album Human Jukebox in December 1986.

This lineup returned to Australia in April 1987 for the Human Jukebox tour. Salmon moved back to Perth with his wife Linda Fearon (co-writer of "Blood Red River") and son. Human Jukebox was released on Karbon in October 1987. The band toured Australia in November 1987, with a lineup of Salmon, Thewlis, Combe on drums and Rixon rejoining on bass. Their last show was at the Shenton Park Hotel in Perth on 27 November 1987.

=== 1987–2006: after the Scientists ===
In Perth between the 1987 tours, Salmon formed Kim Salmon and the Surrealists with Brian Hooper on bass and Tony Pola on drums. He lived in Perth until the early 1990s, playing live solo, with the Surrealists or with "Kim Salmon's Human Jukebox", formed with Kim Williams and Pola to promote the 1991 Scientists compilation Absolute. He also played with the second incarnation of the Beasts of Bourbon from 1988 until 1993. Salmon's music continued in a similar direction to his work with the Scientists.

After the Scientists, Thewlis formed the Interstellar Villains, exploring a musical direction much more rooted in '60s rock, psychedelia and surf music. He then joined Diggory Kenrick and Robert Coyne in Venus Ray, and later played with the Scoundrelles.

=== 2006–present: reformation ===
In May 2006, the Scientists (with a line-up of Thewlis, Salmon, Sujdovic and Chock) were invited by Mudhoney to play at the All Tomorrow's Parties festival in the UK. They also supported Mudhoney at a performance at Shepherd's Bush Empire in London on 11 May 2006. In 2007, a live recording of that performance, Sedition, was released on the ATP Recordings label. The same lineup played in London in April 2007 and at the ATP festival the same month. In February 2008, they supported Sonic Youth for their Australian Daydream Nation shows, performing the mini album Blood Red River in its entirety as part of the ATP-curated Don't Look Back series.

In September 2010, the group played their first ever U.S. show at the ATP New York music festival in Monticello, where they performed Blood Red River in its entirety.

In 2018 and 2019 the Scientists (with a line-up of Salmon, Cowie (née Chock), Sujdovic and Thewlis) toured in Europe and North America, and said that they would soon release a new recording.

In April 2021, the band confirmed the release of a new studio album titled Negativity scheduled for June 2021 and released single "Outsiders". "I Wasn't Good at Picking Friends" was released in May 2021.

The current line-up featured singer-guitarist Kim Salmon, lead guitarist Tony Thewlis, drummer Leanne Cowie and bassist Boris Sujdovic. They toured Australia in 2022 promoting "Negativity", and in 2023 in UK, Spain and Italy.

Leanne Cowie died on 20 March 2025.

== Use in film ==
The song "Last Night" was used in Corey Duffel's part in the Foundation Skateboards' movie That's Life, and the song "We Had Love" was used in the movie RocknRolla.

== Discography ==
=== Studio albums ===
Title	Details	Peak chart positions
Title	Details	UK Indie Chart
The Scientists (aka The Pink Album)	Released: 1981; Label: EMI Custom Records; Format: LP, Cassette	—
Blood Red River	Released: 1983; Label: Au Go Go; Format: LP, Cassette	—
This Heart Doesn't Run On Blood, This Heart Doesn't Run On Love.	Released: 1984; Label: Au Go Go; Format: LP, Cassette	10
Atom Bomb Baby	Released: 1985; Label: Karbon; Format: LP, Cassette	24
You Get What You Deserve!	Released: 1985; Label: Karbon; Format: LP, Cassette	9
Weird Love	Released: 1986; Label: Karbon; Format: LP, Cassette	24
The Human Jukebox	Released: 1987; Label: Karbon; Format: LP, Cassette	—
Negativity	Released: 11 June 2021; Label: In the Red; Format: CD, Digital, streaming	?

=== Live albums ===
Title	Details
1982	Released: 1982; Label: The Scientist; Format: Cassette; Recorded live in May 1982
Rubber Never Sleeps	Released: 1985; Label: Au Go Go; Format: 2xLP, Cassette
Live At ATP-NY 2010	Released: October 2010; Label: Free Music Archive; Format: Digital download
Not for Sale: Live 1978/79	Released: 2019; Label: Grown Up Wrong!; Format: 2xLP, CD, Digital download; Recorded live in 1978 & 1979

=== Compilation albums ===
Title	Details
Heading for a Trauma	Released: 1985; Label: Au Go Go; Format: LP, Cassette
Absolute	Released: 1991; Label: Red Eye Records; Format: LP, Cassette, CD
Blood Red River: 1982-1984	Released: 2000; Label: Citadel; Format: CD, LP
Human Jukebox: 1984-1986	Released: 2002; Label: Citadel; Format: CD, LP
Pissed on Another Planet	Released: 2004; Label: Citadel; Format: 2xCD
Swampland	Released: 2008; Label: Bang!); Format: CD, 2xLP, Download
This Is My Happy Hour (Birth of the Scientists)	Released: 2010 (UK); Label: Cherry Red Phonograph; Format: LP
A Place Called Bad	Released: 2016; Label: The Numero Group; Format: 4xCD

=== Extended plays ===
Title	Details
The Scientists	Released: 1980; Label: White Rider Records; Format: 7" LP
Demolition Derby	Released: 1985; Label: Soundwork; Format: 12" LP, cassette
Pissed On Another Planet (aka The Sweet Corn Sessions)	Released: 1989; Label: Timberyard Records; Format: 12" LP, cassette; Recorded in 1979
9H₂O.SiO₂	Released: 2018; Label: In the Red Recordings; Format: 12" LP, download

=== Singles ===
Title	Year	Album
"Frantic Romantic" / "Shake (Together Tonight)"	1979	Pissed On Another Planet
"This Is My Happy Hour" / "Swampland"	1982	
"We Had Love" / "Clear Spot"	1983	
"When Worlds Collide" / "Ghost Train"	1983	
"You Only Live Twice" / "If It's the Last Thing I Do"	1985	
"Atom Bomb Baby" / "Backwards Man"	1985	Atom Bomb Baby / Demolition Derby
"The Other Place" / "She Cracked"	1985	
"Mini Mini Mini" / "Perpetual Motion"	2017	
"Braindead (Resuscitated)" / "SurvivalsKills"	2018	
"Dissonance"	2019	
"Outsiders"	2021	Negativity
"I Wasn't Good at Picking Friends"	2021	Negativity

== Awards ==
=== West Australian Music Industry Awards ===
The West Australian Music Industry Awards are annual awards celebrating achievements for Western Australian music. They commenced in 1985.

Year	Nominee / work	Award	Result
2019	The Scientists	Hall of Fame	inductee
