= The Johnnys =

Australian pub rock band

- Origin: Sydney, New South Wales, Australia
- Genres: Pub rock, country, punk
- Years active: 1982–1989, 2004
- Labels: Regular, Mushroom, Festival, Urbane
- Past members: Roddy Ray'da; Graham Hood; Billy Pommer; Spencer P. Jones; Michael Armiger; Paul "Slim" Doherty

The Johnnys were an Australian pub rock band from Sydney. The band was formed in 1982 and is still active today. The band combines country and punk musical styles. Members are Graham Hood, Billy Pommer Jr and Slim Doherty and have included founder, Roddy Ray'da (aka Roddy Radalj) and Spencer P. Jones.

== History ==
The Johnnys formed in 1982 in Sydney when bass guitarist Graham Hood tried out for the Hoodoo Gurus after quitting the Allniters. He met Hoodoo Gurus' guitarist Roddy Ray'da (aka Roddy Radalj) and they discussed an idea for a side project: playing pub rock in a country music style at a punk pace—which was labelled as cow punk. Ray'da left Hoodoo Gurus and, as a lead vocalist and guitarist with Hood and drummer Billy Pommer Jr, founded The Johnnys. The Johnnys performed its first concert at Palms disco on Oxford St, Taylors Square, Darlinghurst Sydney Australia in November 1982. New Zealand-born Spencer P. Jones joined on guitar and backing vocals. The four-piece released "I Think You're Cute" in October on Regular Records, Ray'da left the group in early 1984 and formed Love Rodeo. Jones took on lead vocals and the band signed with the Green Label to release "My Buzzsaw Baby (Really Cut Me Up)" and an extended play, The Johnnys in November 1984.

"(There's Gonna be a) Showdown"

In 1985, the band had signed with Mushroom Records which released their single, "Injun Joe" in November. "(There's Gonna Be a) Showdown" followed in March 1986 and then "Bleeding Heart " in June. Their debut album Highlights of Dangerous Life appeared in August and was produced by Ross Wilson of Daddy Cool and contained the three singles. Two non-album singles followed in 1987. Wilson produced their second album, Grown Up Wrong, released in August 1988 which included two further singles, "Motorbikin" (July) and "Anything Could Happen" (November). Michael Armiger (ex-Paul Kelly Band) replaced Hood on bass guitar. The band broke up in 1989 with Jones continuing in his side-project Beasts of Bourbon.

According to rock music historian, Ian McFarlane, "Despite being one of the most popular bands on the pub-rock circuit, The Johnnys never crossed over into the premier league". They gigged sporadically before performing as a three-piece with guests for a Sydney benefit show for Spencer P Jones in June, 2016. They remain a trio and have toured New Zealand in 2018. They played most of the support spots on the 2019 Australian "Still Here" Tour by The Beasts (ex-Beasts of Bourbon).

== Members ==
- Graham Hood – bass guitar
- Billy Pommer Jr. – drums
- Roddy Ray'da – guitar, vocals
- Spencer P. Jones – guitar, vocals (d. 2018)
- Michael Armiger – bass guitar
- Paul "Slim" Doherty – guitar

== Discography ==
=== Studio albums ===
List of studio albums, with selected details and chart positions
Title	Album details	Peak chart positions
Title	Album details	AUS
Highlights of a Dangerous Life	Released: August 1986; Format: LP, CD, cassette; Label: Mushroom	19
Grown Up Wrong	Released: September 1988; Format: LP, CD, cassette; Label: Mushroom	71

=== Live albums ===
Title	Album details
Live at La Dolce Vita	Released: 1991; Format: CD, cassette; Label: Houlala

=== Compilation albums ===
List of compilation albums, with selected details and chart positions
Title	Album details	Peak chart positions
Title	Album details	AUS
Rarehide – Outtakes, B-Sides and Rarities	Released: 13 November 2026; Format: LP, digital; Label: Cheersquad	40

=== Singles ===
List of singles, with selected chart positions
Year	Title	Peak chart positions	Album
Year	Title	AUS	Album
1983	"I Think You're Cute"/"Mountain Man"	—	Non-album singles
1984	"There's Time"/"Way of the West"	—	Non-album singles
1984	"My Buzzsaw Baby (Really Cut Me Up)"	—	Non-album singles
1985	"Injun Joe"	32	Highlights of a Dangerous Life
1986	"(There's Gonna Be a) Showdown"	46	Highlights of a Dangerous Life
1986	"Bleeding Heart"	71	Highlights of a Dangerous Life
1987	"Elvisly Yours/Black Bart"	—	Non-album single
1988	"Motorbikin'"/"Shameless Girl"	—	Grown Up Wrong
1988	"Anything Could Happen"/"Bounty Hunter"	—	Grown Up Wrong
1988	"Don't Put the Blame on Me"	—	Grown Up Wrong
