= Spencer P. Jones =

New Zealand guitarist and singer-songwriter (1956–2018)

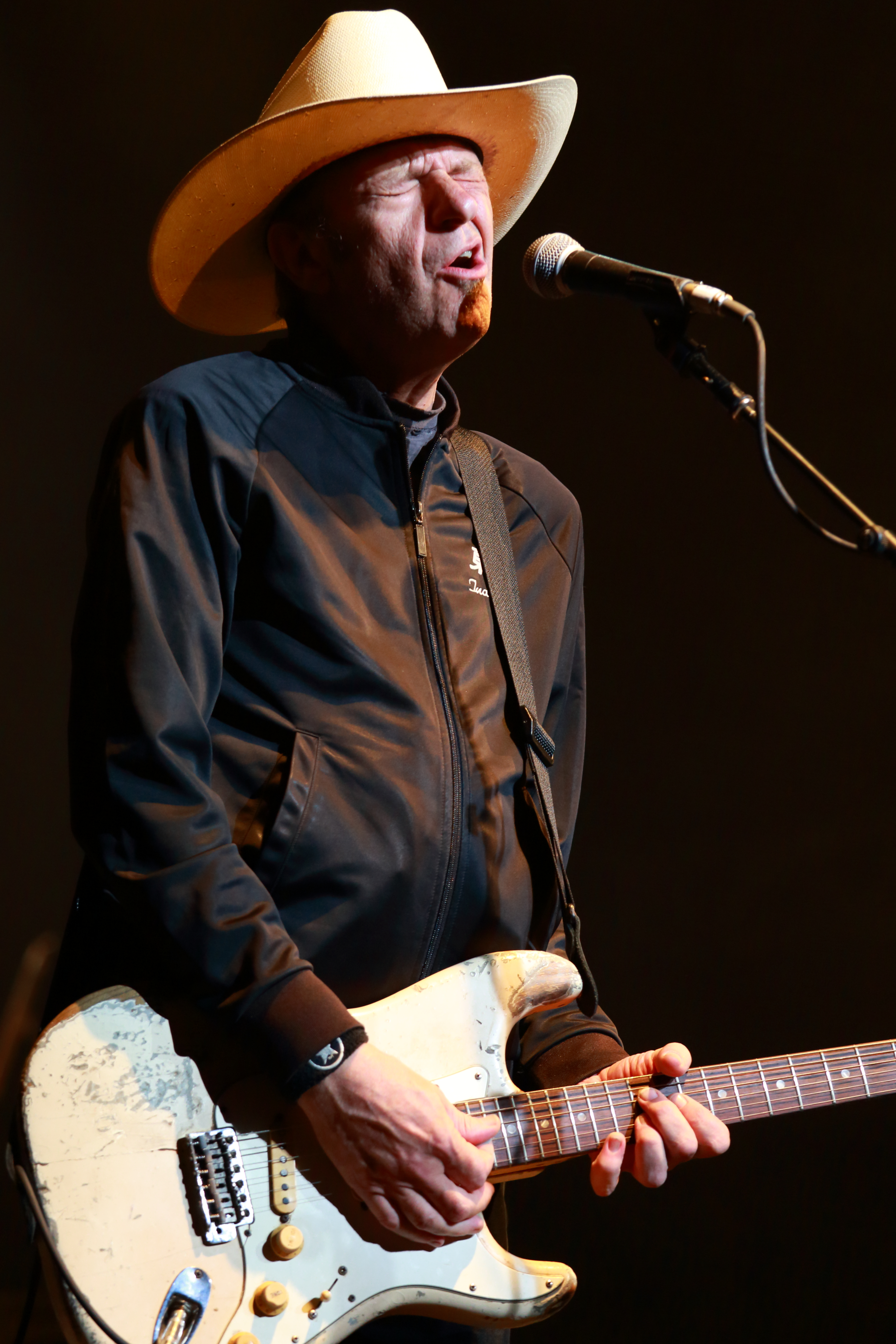
- Jones performing with the Beasts of Bourbon at Byron Bay Bluesfest in 2013

Background information
- Born: Spencer Patrick Jones; 28 October 1956; Te Awamutu, New Zealand
- Origin: Sydney, New South Wales, Australia
- Died: 21 August 2018 (aged 61) Melbourne, Victoria, Australia
- Genres: Pub rock, country punk
- Occupations: Musician, singer-songwriter
- Instruments: Lead guitar, lead vocals, piano
- Years active: 1976–2018
- Labels: Red Eye/Polydor, Spooky, MGM, Bang!, Beast
- Formerly of: The Emotional Retreads, Country Killed, Cuban Heels, Beats Working, North 2 Alaskans, The Johnnys, Beasts of Bourbon, Olympic Sideburns, Paul Kelly and The Coloured Girls, Legendary Stardust Cowboys, The Rock Party, The Butcher Shop, Minced Meat, Hell To Pay, Chris Bailey and The General Dog, Maurice Frawley and The Working Class Ringos, Sacred Cowboys, Paul Kelly Band, Singers for the Red Black and Gold, The Cow Penalty, Escape Committee, Kim Salmon

Spencer Patrick Jones (28 October 1956 – 21 August 2018) was a New Zealand guitarist and singer-songwriter from Te Awamutu. From 1976 he worked in Australia and was a member of various groups including The Johnnys, Beasts of Bourbon, Paul Kelly and The Coloured Girls, Chris Bailey and The General Dog, Maurice Frawley and The Working Class Ringos, and Sacred Cowboys. He also issued ten albums as a solo artist. In May 2012 Australian Guitar magazine rated Jones as one of Australia's Top 40 best guitarists.

== Biography ==
Spencer Patrick Jones was born 28 October 1956 and grew up on a farm in Te Awamutu, New Zealand. His father was a funeral director, farmer and then news agent. When his family moved to Auckland, Jones and his siblings studied piano. On his 14th birthday he was given a guitar and became a self-taught musician. From 1976 he worked in Australia and his early groups were The Emotional Retards, Country Killed, Cuban Heels (1979–81), Beats Working (1981–82) and North 2 Alaskans (1982–83).

In 1983 Jones joined The Johnnys, a pub rock band, on lead guitar and backing vocals. Jones co-wrote their debut single, "I Think You're Cute", with their bass guitarist and lead vocalist, Roddy Rayda, which was issued in October. When Rayda left early in the next year, Spencer took over lead vocals. In April 1986 The Canberra Times described the group as a "combination of country punk, mayhem and cowboy image". In August that year Mushroom Records issued their debut album, Highlights of a Dangerous Life, with Ross Wilson producing (Skyhooks, Company Caine, Mondo Rock). The group broke up in 1989 and Jones continued with various other bands.

In August 1983 while a member of The Johnnys, Jones formed a side-project, Beasts of Bourbon (1983–85, 1988–93, 1996–97, 2003–08, 2013) with James Baker on drums (ex-Hoodoo Gurus), Tex Perkins on vocals (Dum Dums), Kim Salmon on guitar and Boris Sujdovic on bass guitar (both ex-The Scientists). Except for mainstays, Jones and Perkins, the line-up has changed as the group splintered and reformed several times. Steven Corby of The Canberra Times described Beasts of Bourbon in August 1990 as "a mutation of rock 'n roll, some blues, jazz, country, and a cornucopia of 20th century music as well as fartin' and thumpin', sexy girls, and ladies of the night".

Other groups Jones worked with include Olympic Sideburns (1983), Paul Kelly and The Coloured Girls (1985), Legendary Stardust Cowboys (1986), The Rock Party (1986), The Butcher Shop (1988–93), Minced Meat (1989), Hell to Pay (1990–92), Chris Bailey and The General Dog (1992), Maurice Frawley and The Working Class Ringos (1993–2000), Sacred Cowboys (1994–95), Paul Kelly Band (1996, 1998, 2001–02) and Singers for the Red Black and Gold (1997).

In November 1994 Jones released his debut solo album, Rumour of Death, which he co-produced with Dave McCluney for Red Eye Records and Polydor Records. Jones had started planning for his album in 1989 or 1990 but other projects intervened including Hell to Pay. Working with Jones on the album were Warren Ellis on violin (Dirty Three, Nick Cave and the Bad Seeds), Brian Henry Hooper on bass guitar (Beasts of Bourbon, Kim Salmon and the Surrealists), Peter Jones on drums (ex-Harem Scarem), Graham Lee on pedal steel guitar (ex-The Triffids), Nick Rischbieth on guitar (Sacred Cowboys), and Conway Savage on piano (Nick Cave and the Bad Seeds).

Australian musicologist, Ian McFarlane, described the album as having "a timeless rock'n'roll feel with country elements". Fellow rock music journalist, Ed Nimmervoll, felt it was "a growling, introspective country rock album" with Spencer "a little unsure about the sound of his own voice but backing his vocals with strong songwriting, sparse arrangements, and a great performance". In March the following year he issued a single, "The World's Got Everything in It", from the album. The track had been written and first recorded by Minced Meat, a duo of Jones and Perkins, back in 1989; it was later re-recorded by Beasts of Bourbon.

In late 1999 Jones formed a band, The Last Gasp, working with Hooper again on bass guitar, joined by Kieran Box on keyboards and Dan Luscombe on guitar (both from The Blackeyed Susans), and Timmy Jack Ray on drums (Powder Monkeys). By mid-November the following year Jones issued his second solo album, The Last Gasp. It was produced by Tony Cohen, Jones was backed by a nine-piece session band. Nimmervoll declared it was Album of the Week: "he's comfortable with the sound of his voice ... You can feel the smoky bar rooms this music was born in. The atmosphere is thick with music and attitude". I-94 Bar's The Barman noted the sound is "big, brassy and sprawling. Keyboard colourings abound, though there are sightings of Spencer's understated guitar".

By November 2001 Jones released his next album, The Lost Anxiety Tapes, on MGM Distribution, featuring Cow Penalty with Amie Daniels on guitar, Steve Hadley on bass guitar, Des Heffner on drums and Matt Heydon on keyboards, piano, organ, synthesiser, and percussion. The Barman found the tracks had "simple, but effective, rock tuneage that push the edges in all sorts of little ways and exhibit not an ounce of fat". Cosmik Debris Magazine's John Sekerka described Jones as one who "knows how to confuse, confound, amuse and delight" with his "various catchy melodies with provocative words, culminating in stupefying songs you'll be hard pressed not to hum".

For his next album, Fait Accompli (2003), Jones worked with three different bands, Cow Penalty (with Heydon joined by Helen Cattanach on bass guitar, ex-Moler, and Harry Fischer on drums) on three of twelve tracks, Escape Committee (with Cattanach, Phil Gionfriddo on steel guitar, and Andy Moore on drums) on seven tracks, and New York-based group, The Beeks (Steve Boyle on guitar and keyboards, Billy Ficca on drums, and Brian Ritchie on vocals and bass guitar) on two tracks.

Nimmervoll described Fait Accompli being "filled with the growling impatient restless menace real rock and roll is made of" and with Jones fronting three groups "[he's] in the spotlight, hat on head, cigarette dangling from the corner of his mouth, guitar in hand, telling you how life is or how he wants to imagine it. It don't matter. It ain't pretty". The Barman noted that it has a "greasy appropriation of the blues" and his "distinctive drawl and scuzzy lead guitar". Sleazegrinder's reviewer declared that Jones "writes and plays every lick, every lyric from the bottom of his soul, you can always feel it when someone spills their guts, means every bit of it, when they've not only written some tunes, but lived 'em, too. [The album is] a full experience, not a random assortment of half written leftovers, like most releases we endure nowadays".

On 7 August 2006 Jones issued an album, Immolation & Amelioration 1995–2005, which updated previously unfinished material from his back catalogue. It was commissioned by Spanish label, Bang! Records, where Spencer had developed a loyal following. The Age's Patrick Donovan opined that it showed his "many moods and styles, from snarling, swampy guitar slinger to tender balladeer, and features his many incarnations". The Barman described the various line ups as "a star-studded list of drop-ins, drop-outs and dropkicks to be sure, but the real star is Spencer hisself".

For his April 2007 album, Fugitive Songs, Jones worked with the Escape Committee (Cattanach, Gionfriddo, and Moore) again. The album was dedicated to veteran hard rocker, Ian Rilen (1947–2006), who had been a band mate in Hell to Pay. The Age's Andrew Stafford cited Jones remembering Rilen "I was playing in Hell to Pay and things started getting messy. I remember Ian saying, 'This is enough of this, we've got to stop doing it' – and he screwed up the syringe in his hand, you know, the needle sticking into his hand – 'F--- this shit, we've got to stop doing this!'" The album itself showed "[t]here's no one making better rock'n'roll records in the country". The Barman finds Fugitive Songs is "bluesy rock with the smell of cordite not far away. It doesn't bust down any barriers ... as fine an effort as anything else in his backpages".

During 2008 Jones performed with a revised line up of the Escape Committee – Cattanach was joined by John Nolan on guitar (ex-Bored!, Hoss, Powder Monkeys); Hamish Marr on keyboards and backing vocals; and Cal McAlpine on drums (ex-The Chosen Few). Together they recorded a performance at the Elsternwick Hotel which was issued as Jones' first live album, Hang On... Hang On... Live from Melbourne, later that year. I-Bar's Simon Li noted that it "enhances his reputation ... as a true National Living Treasure ... [it] features nine classic songs for the world weary and downtrodden, drawn mostly from his Spooky Records catalogue". While fellow reviewer at the website, The Barman felt it is "[r]aucously rude and liver than your great grandfather will ever be, this bang-up bag of some of Spencer's best-loved tunes dangerously hits the spot – like petrol poured on a barbecue. The ragged two-part vocals just add to the ambience". That year Jones also produced and played guitar on the self titled debut album by young Melbourne singer/songwriter Jules Sheldon.

Sobering Thoughts, his next solo studio album, was issued on 10 September 2010 on In the Dog House Records. In February 2013 Jones recalled "[it] is my favourite I think. I really like that record. It was easy to do, the songs came together quickly, I really like everybody's playing on it ... [it] was made at a real difficult time in my life. I kind of got through that time by making that record. By purging a whole lot of venom. A record has to have a bit of pain and a lot of action".

In May 2012 Australian Guitar magazine rated Jones as one of Australia's Top 40 best guitarists. Jones also worked with the Nothing Butts, which had The Drones's Gareth Liddiard on guitar and Fiona Kitschin on bass guitar; and former Beasts of Bourbon band mate, James Baker on drums. They issued an album, Spencer P. Jones And The Nothing Butts on Shock Records on 9 November 2012. Late that year he had teamed with Salmon (both ex-Beasts of Bourbon) which resulted in another album, The Runaways (February 2013).

Jones was diagnosed with inoperable liver cancer in March 2018, nevertheless he performed in a benefit concert for his terminally ill band mate Hooper in their band Beasts of Bourbon. In June he publicly announced his diagnosis and entered palliative care. He died on 21 August 2018 and was survived by his wife Angie Jones.

== Discography ==
=== Albums ===
- Rumour of Death (November 1994) – Red Eye/Polydor
- The Last Gasp (November 2000) – Spooky Records (Spook001)
- The Lost Anxiety Tapes (by Spencer P. Jones featuring Cow Penalty) (November 2001) – Spooky Records/MGM Distribution (Spooky004)
- Fait Accompli (2003) – Spooky Records (Spooky010)
- Immolation & Amelioration 1995–2005 (7 August 2006) – Bang! Records (BANG! – LP14), Spooky Records (Spooky022)
- Fugitive Songs (April 2007) – Spooky Records (Spooky024)
- Hang On... Hang On... Live from Melbourne (2008) – Beast Records (BR 088)
- Sobering Thoughts (by Spencer P. Jones & The Escape Committee) (10 September 2010) – In the Dog House/Aztec (INTDHR 003)
- Spencer P. Jones and the Nothing Butts (9 November 2012) – Shock Records (MAX001)
- Runaways (by Spencer P. Jones and Kim Salmon) (February 2013)

== Awards and nominations ==
=== EG Awards / Music Victoria Awards ===
The EG Awards (known as Music Victoria Awards since 2013) are an annual awards night celebrating Victorian music. They commenced in 2006.

Year	Nominee / work	Award	Result
2012	Spencer P. Jones	Best Male	Nominated
