= Mars Needs Guitars! =

Studio album by Hoodoo Gurus
- Released: 8 March 1985
- Recorded: 1984
- Genre: Rock
- Length: 33:35
- Label: Big Time, Chrysalis, Elektra
- Producer: Charles Fisher, Hoodoo Gurus

Hoodoo Gurus chronology
Stoneage Romeos (1984)	Mars Needs Guitars! (1985)	Blow Your Cool! (1987)

Singles from Mars Needs Guitars!
- 1. "Bittersweet" Released: June 1985; 2. "Like Wow – Wipeout" Released: October 1985; 3. "Death Defying" Released: February 1986; 4. "Poison Pen" Released: September 1986

Professional ratings
Review scores
Source	Rating
AllMusic	4.5/5 stars
Robert Christgau	B−
The Rolling Stone Album Guide	4/5 stars

Mars Needs Guitars! is the second studio album by Australian rock band Hoodoo Gurus, released on 8 March 1985. The title is a reference to the 1967 science fiction film, Mars Needs Women. Singles from the album were "Bittersweet", "Like Wow – Wipeout", "Death Defying" and "Poison Pen". Mars Needs Guitars! reached No. 140 on the American Billboard 200 albums chart in 1986.

The title track, "Mars Needs Guitars" (also the B-side of "Bittersweet" single), was written by all five Gurus and lead vocals were by Brad Shepherd. All other tracks were written and featured lead vocals by Dave Faulkner. Hayride to Hell (1995) is a short film written and directed by former Gurus member Kimble Rendall.

In 2000, Dave Faulkner said "When we commenced the sessions for Mars Needs Guitars! we had a brand new drummer, Mark Kingsmill who altered our lives forever with his distinctive explosive style."

In October 2010, it was listed in the book, 100 Best Australian Albums, with their previous album, Stoneage Romeos at No. 28.

== Reception ==
Cash Box magazine said "Excellent dynamics and songwriting shine through on nearly every cut."

== Track listing ==
All tracks are written by Dave Faulkner, except where noted

No.	Title	Writer(s)	Length
1.	"Bittersweet"		3:44
2.	"Poison Pen"		4:09
3.	"In the Wild"		3:07
4.	"Death Defying"		3:21
5.	"Like Wow – Wipeout"		3:09
6.	"Hayride to Hell"		3:15
7.	"Show Some Emotion"		2:56
8.	"Other Side of Paradise"		3:31
9.	"Mars Needs Guitars"	James Baker, Clyde Bramley, Faulkner, Mark Kingsmill, Brad Shepherd	2:52
10.	"She"		3:28

2005 re-release
No.	Title	Writer(s)	Length
11.	"Bring the Hoodoo Down"		2:54
12.	"Turkey Dinner"		4:14
13.	"Death Ship" (live)	Faulkner, Roddy Radalj, Alan Sharples	2:42
14.	"In the Wild" (live)		3:29
15.	"Teenage Head" (live)	Cyril Jordan, Roy Loney	3:02

== Personnel ==
Credited to:

=== Hoodoo Gurus ===
- Clyde Bramley – bass, backing vocals
- Dave Faulkner – lead vocals (except track 9), guitar, keyboards
- Mark Kingsmill – drums, cymbals
- Brad Shepherd – lead guitar, backing vocals, lead vocals (track 9), harmonica (mouth harp)

=== Technical ===
- John Bee – engineer
- Greg Henderson – assistant engineer
- Richard Allan – illustrations
- Charles Fisher – producer (except track 11)
- Don Bartley – mastering (remastering)
- Hoodoo Gurus – producer (track 11)

== Charts ==
Chart (1985/86)	Peak position
Australian (Kent Music Report)	5
New Zealand Albums (RMNZ)	18
Swedish Albums (Sverigetopplistan)	47
United States (Billboard 200)	140

== Certifications ==
Region	Certification	Certified units/sales
Australia (ARIA)	3× Platinum	210,000^{^}
^{^} Shipments figures based on certification alone.
