= Stoneage Cameos =

Compilation album by Various artists
- Released: August 2005
- Recorded: November 2004, March and June 2005
- Studios: Sing Sing Studios, Melbourne
- Label: Shock Records
- Producer: Andy Baldwin

Stoneage Cameos is a Hoodoo Gurus tribute album by various artists, released by Shock Records in August 2005

The Age described the album as containing "a who's who of Australian bands" each playing a song from the Hoodoo Gurus' 1984 debut Stoneage Romeos, arranged in the album's original playlist order.

The project was masterminded by Wally Kempton (bassist of the band Even), and Jason "Evo" Evans. Performances on this tribute album were cited at their 2007 ARIA Hall of Fame induction.

The CD was launched at the Meadows Greyhound Race Track in Broadmeadows, Victoria.

== Track listing ==
The track list is as follows:

No.	Title	Artist	Length
1.	"(Let's All) Turn On"	The Wrights	3:16
2.	"I Want You Back"	The Spazzys	3:17
3.	"Arthur"	Even	3:18
4.	"Death Ship"	Dan Kelly	4:40
5.	"Dig It Up"	Dallas Crane	3:06
6.	"My Girl"	Spiderbait	2:28
7.	"Zanzibar"	The Blackeyed Susans	4:02
8.	"Leilani"	The Living End	4:21
9.	"Tojo"	You Am I	3:44
10.	"In The Echo Chamber"	Rocket Science	3:32
11.	"I Was a Kamikaze Pilot"	Grinspoon	3:16
12.	"Leilani Part 2"	The Sailors	3:23
13.	"Be My Guru"	Persian Rugs	2:52
14.	"Hoodoo You Love"	The Drones	2:47
15.	"My Girl (Part 2)"	Spiderbait	3:07
