= My Girl (Hoodoo Gurus song) =

Single by Hoodoo Gurus

from the album Stoneage Romeos
- B-side: "Be My Guru"
- Released: October 1983 (Australia)
- Recorded: Trafalgar Studios
- Genre: Jangle pop
- Length: 2:36
- Label: Big Time (Australia); Demon (UK)
- Songwriter: Dave Faulkner
- Producer: Alan Thorne

Hoodoo Gurus singles chronology
"Tojo" (1983)	"My Girl" (1983)	"I Want You Back" (1984)

"My Girl" Alternative Cover
- 1985 UK release

"My Girl" is a song by Australian rock group Hoodoo Gurus. It was released in October 1983 as the third single from the group's debut studio album, Stoneage Romeos and peaked at No. 35 in Australia. It was written by Dave Faulkner

The song was also subsequently released in the United Kingdom in 1985 by Demon Records with a different cover sleeve and a different B-side, "Leilani".

== Composition ==
Faulkner wrote the song while having a walk when he was 21. He said, "the bassline, which is a classic chord progression, the 1–4–5, just popped into my head. And I started singing the melody that became the verse, and then the chorus, and it was all there in my head. Then the lyrics. And I actually came back home and sang it into my tape recorder – my little cassette player – and the whole song was kind of there."

Faulkner explained, "It was a love song about love songs, a tribute to all the ‘60s boy-girl love songs, and I felt bad that some people would get quite sad about it —‘That poor guy!’—because it was just a joke!"

== Video ==
The quirky video for the song was shown on Australian Broadcasting Corporation's popular TV series Countdown and is based around a dog trainer and his former champion greyhound: as suggested by former member Kimble Rendall, who had left Gurus to return to film-making.

"To this day people insist the song was 'written about a dog'. Oh, well. The truth is, it was meant to be part of a never-made home movie, a tribute to 60's beach movies entitled 'Gidget Goes Ape'." – Dave Faulkner.

The music video locations include: Bellevue St, Glebe; Wentworth Park; the pub was the Central Markets in Darling Harbour, was next to what is now the Pumphouse. The UTS Tower is also briefly visible as Faulkner grooms the greyhound early in the video. The greyhound that wins the race in the video is Winifred Bale and the race is the 1983 National Sprint at Harold Park in Australia.

"The dog was called Defiant Lee. That dog was very beautiful: I could have kissed that dog myself, I must admit. The dog was a champion. All those trophies you see in the video were, in fact, real, from that one dog. It was incredible. I forget the trainer's name, I've got to be honest."- Dave Faulkner.

== B-side ==
According to Faulkner the B-side, "Be My Guru", "has always been our unofficial anthem and we loved to play it whenever we felt an audience was too comfortable during a show. This was the first of what we called our 'Punishment Songs'. It was put on the flip-side of 'My Girl' to add a bit of acid to the sugar, so to speak."- Dave Faulkner.

== Other versions ==
"My Girl" was performed by Spiderbait on the 2005 tribute album Stoneage Cameos (see Stoneage Romeos), Spiderbait also performed "My Girl Part 2"; where "Be My Guru" was performed by Persian Rugs (containing Hoodoo Gurus' Faulkner, Brad Shepherd and Mark Kingsmill together with bassist Kendall James). The album was launched at the Meadows Greyhound Racing Track in Broadmeadows, Victoria in reference to the video for "My Girl".

== Track listing ==
7" single (BTS1072)

1. "My Girl" (Dave Faulkner) – 2:36
2. "Be My Guru" (Dave Faulkner, James Baker) – 2:35

== Personnel ==
Credited to:

- James Baker — Drums
- Clyde Bramley – Bass, vocals
- Dave Faulkner — Lead vocals, guitar
- Brad Shepherd — Guitar, vocals
- Producer, Engineer – Alan Thorne

== Charts ==
Chart (1983–85)	Peak position
Australian (Kent Music Report)	35
UK Indie	38
