= Hoodoo Voodoo =

EP by Hoodoo Gurus
- Released: February 1997
- Genre: Alternative rock, college rock
- Length: 33:06
- Label: Mushroom
- Producer: Charles Fisher, Hoodoo Gurus

Hoodoo Gurus chronology
Blue Cave (1996)	Hoodoo Voodoo (1997)	Electric Chair (1997)

Hoodoo Voodoo is an EP by Australian rock group Hoodoo Gurus and was released by Mushroom Records in February 1997. This EP includes several tracks from the band's seventh studio album Blue Cave including "Down on Me", "Son of a Gun", and "Mind the Spider". Also includes extended remixes of "Son of a Gun" and "Down on Me" as well as an additional track "Whoopee Cushion".

== Track listing ==
All tracks written by Dave Faulkner.

1. "Down on Me" — 2:56
2. "Son of a Gun" — 3:57
3. "Mind the Spider" — 6:30
4. "Whoopee Cushion" — 4:54
5. "Son of a Gun" (Attractive Head Inc remix) — 7:59
6. "Down on Me" (Attractive Head Inc remix) — 6:45

== Personnel ==
- Dave Faulkner
- Mark Kingsmill
- Brad Shepherd
- Richard Grossman
- Producers — Charles Fisher, Hoodoo Gurus, Attractive Head Inc (additional production)
- Engineers — Ben Suthers (tracks 1, 2, 5, 6), Scott Rashleigh (tracks 3, 4)
- Remixers — Attractive Head Inc (tracks 1, 2, 3, 5, 6), Mr & Mrs Chill (aka Stuart McCarthy and Melinda McCarthy of Southend) (track 4)
