= Poison Pen (song) =

Single by Hoodoo Gurus

from the album Mars Needs Guitars!
- B-side: "In the Wild"; "Teenage Head"
- Released: September 1986
- Genre: Rock
- Length: 4:06
- Label: Big Time
- Songwriter: Dave Faulkner
- Producer: Charles Fisher

Hoodoo Gurus singles chronology
"Death Defying" (1986)	"Poison Pen" (1986)	"What's My Scene?" (1987)

"Poison Pen" is a song by Australian rock group Hoodoo Gurus. It was written by Dave Faulkner. and released in September 1986 as the fourth and final single from the group's second studio album, Mars Needs Guitars! The song peaked at number 76 on the Australian charts.

In June 2000, Dave Faulkner said "The Gurus' first manager, Stuart Coupe, wrongly thought that 'Poison Pen' was written about him, probably because of his notoriety as a Rock Journalist (often an oxymoron) and he had also been recently replaced... The song was about the fallout from a relationship that had turned bitter (with no 'sweet') attached)".

== Track listing ==
7" version (BTS 1793)

1. "Poison Pen" (Dave Faulkner) — 4:06
2. "In the Wild" (Faulkner) — 3:29 (Recorded live at Selina's Sydney 17 and 18 February 1986)
3. "Teenage Head" (Cyril Jordan, Roy Loney) — 3:02 (recorded live at Selina's Sydney 17 and 18 February 1986)

== Personnel ==
- Clyde Bramley — bass, backing vocals
- Dave Faulkner — lead vocals, guitar
- Mark Kingsmill — drums, cymbals
- Brad Shepherd — guitar, backing vocals
- Producer — Charles Fisher
- Engineer — John Bee
- Mastering — Don Bartley

== Charts ==
Chart (1986)	Peak position
Australian (Kent Music Report)	76
