= Tojo (song) =

Single by Hoodoo Gurus

from the album Stoneage Romeos
- B-side: "(Lets All) Turn On"
- Released: June 1983
- Recorded: Trafalgar Studios
- Genre: Rock
- Length: 3:11
- Label: Big Time (Australia)
- Songwriter(s): Dave Faulkner
- Producer(s): Alan Thorne

Hoodoo Gurus singles chronology
"Leilani" (1982)	"Tojo" (1983)	"My Girl" (1983)

"Tojo" a.k.a. "Tojo Never Made It to Darwin" is a song by Australian rock group Hoodoo Gurus. It was released in June 1983 as the second single from their debut studio album, Stoneage Romeos (1984). It was written by their lead singer-guitarist, Dave Faulkner, and produced by Alan Thorne. The title refers to the World War II Japanese General and Prime Minister Hideki Tōjō.

"Tojo" saw the introduction of new band members Clyde Bramley and Brad Shepherd, with Bramley providing bass, which had previously been noticeably absent from the band.

'"Tojo" was an answer song to an Australian hit of a few years earlier, "Santa Never Made it Into Darwin" which had been released to raise money for the victims of Cyclone Tracy which had almost destroyed Darwin on Christmas Eve, 1975 (sic). During World War II the Japanese army invaded New Guinea but failed to reach Australia thanks to the heroic resistance however Darwin was bombed heavily and often.' – Dave Faulkner.

"Santa Never Made It into Darwin" had been recorded by New Zealanders Bill (Cate) & Boyd (Robinson) which reached No. 2 in Australia during February 1975, Cyclone Tracy actually devastated Darwin on Christmas Eve / Christmas Day 1974.

"Tojo" was performed by You Am I on the 2005 tribute album Stoneage Cameos (see Stoneage Romeos); while "(Let's All) Turn On" was performed by The Wrights.

== Track listing ==
7" single (BTS984)

1. "Tojo" (Faulkner) — 3:11
2. "(Let's All) Turn On" (Faulkner) — 3:00

== Personnel ==
Credited to:

- James Baker — drums
- Clyde Bramley — bass, vocals
- Dave Faulkner — lead vocals, guitar
- Brad Shepherd — guitar, vocals
- Producer — Alan Thorne
- Design (cover) — Yanni Stumbles, Faulkner
- Photo (rear cover) — Annie Sidlo

== Charts ==
Chart (1983)	Peak position
Australian (Kent Music Report)	80
