= Bittersweet (Hoodoo Gurus song) =

1985 song by Hoodoo Gurus

Single by Hoodoo Gurus

from the album Mars Needs Guitars!
- B-side: "Mars Needs Guitars"
- Released: June 1985
- Genre: Rock
- Length: 3:46
- Label: Big Time
- Songwriter: Dave Faulkner
- Producer: Charles Fisher

Hoodoo Gurus singles chronology
"I Want You Back" (1984)	"Bittersweet" (1985)	"Like Wow - Wipeout!" (1985)

"Bittersweet" is a song by Australian rock group Hoodoo Gurus. It was written by Dave Faulkner, released in June 1985 as the lead single from the group's second studio album, Mars Needs Guitars! It peaked at number 16 in Australia.

== Composition ==
In 2000, Dave Faulkner said: "I vowed to myself that I would write less comic narratives and try to express my sentiments in a more forthright way. I feel I succeeded with 'Bittersweet' though at the time I didn't think that a) the band would want to play it and b) our audience would want to hear it. I was happily wrong on both counts." He later added, "So when I got them to rehearse it, it sounded perfect, of course. But, in my imagination, I thought, 'This sounds so different to anything we've been doing and no one's gonna like this' – it’s not the bright, jolly, cartoon stuff that we’d sort of been known for."

== Track listings ==
7" single (BTS1503)

1. "Bittersweet" (Dave Faulkner) — 3:46
2. "Mars Needs Guitars" (James Baker, Clyde Bramley, Faulkner, Mark Kingsmill and Brad Shepherd) — 2:51

== Personnel ==
Credited to:

- James Baker — drums
- Clyde Bramley — bass, backing vocals
- Dave Faulkner — lead vocals (track A), guitar
- Mark Kingsmill — drums, cymbals
- Brad Shepherd — guitar, lead vocals (track B), harmonica
- Producer — Charles Fisher
- Engineer — John Bee
- Mastering — Don Bartley

== Charts ==
Chart (1985)	Peak position
Australian (Kent Music Report)	16

== Cover versions & others ==
Courtney Love provided lead vocals for her band Hole's version of "Bittersweet" with Brad Shepard playing guitar and contributing backing vocals at Hole's 1999 Big Day Out performance.
