= Like Wow – Wipeout =

Single by Hoodoo Gurus

from the album Mars Needs Guitars!
- B-side: "Bring the Hoodoo Down"
- Released: October 1985
- Recorded: 1984
- Genre: Garage punk
- Length: 3:09
- Label: Big Time
- Songwriter(s): Dave Faulkner
- Producer(s): Charles Fisher

Hoodoo Gurus singles chronology
"Bittersweet" (1985)	"Like Wow – Wipeout" (1985)	"Death Defying" (1986)

"Like Wow – Wipeout" is a song written by Dave Faulkner and recorded by Australian rock group Hoodoo Gurus. It was released in October 1985 as the second single from the group's second studio album, Mars Needs Guitars! and peaked at number 16 on the Australian charts.

In June 2000, Dave Faulkner said: "[It] was only recorded as a B-side but producer Charles Fisher thought it 'had something' and should be included on the album. No-one was more surprised than us when it became the second single and our biggest hit at the time. We just liked it because it was noisy."

== Track listing ==
7" single (BTS1588)

1. "Like Wow – Wipeout!" — 3:09
2. "Bring the Hoodoo Down" — 3:01

== Personnel ==
Credits:

- James Baker — drums
- Clyde Bramley — bass, backing vocals
- Dave Faulkner — lead vocals (track A), guitar
- Mark Kingsmill — drums, cymbals
- Brad Shepherd — guitar, lead vocals (track B), harmonica
- Producer — Charles Fisher
- Engineer — John Bee
- Mastering — Don Bartley

== Charts ==
Chart (1985/86)	Peak position
Australian (Kent Music Report)	15
