= I Want You Back (Hoodoo Gurus song) =

Single by Hoodoo Gurus

from the album Stoneage Romeos
- B-side: "Who Do You Love?"
- Released: March 1984
- Recorded: Trafalgar Studios
- Genre: Power pop; pop rock
- Length: 2:45
- Label: Big Time (Australia); Demon (UK)
- Songwriter(s): Dave Faulkner
- Producer(s): Alan Thorne

Hoodoo Gurus singles chronology
"My Girl" (1983)	"I Want You Back" (1984)	"Bittersweet" (1985)

"I Want You Back" is a song by Australian rock group Hoodoo Gurus, released in March 1984 as the fourth and final single from their debut album Stoneage Romeos. "I Want You Back" was written by Dave Faulkner. Its B-side, "Who Do You Love?" (a.k.a. "Hoodoo You Love?") was recorded live at 2JJJ.

The 7" single and video clip version of the song is an edit that removes the second half of the double verse usually heard before the first chorus. To date the regular album version has been used on all subsequent Hoodoo Gurus compilations.

In an interview with Fred Mills of Harp magazine in January 2007, Faulkner revealed that the song was written not about a former lover but about the split with Radalj: "Basically, when Rod Radalj left the Gurus he was very dismissive of us, trying to move on and kind of burn everything behind him: 'Oh, it's not worth staying in that band. They're terrible!' So I basically turned that emotion around: 'Here's this guy who ditched us and he's acting like the spurned lover!' It was me saying, 'You'll regret it.'...Well, yeah, I just turned all that stuff into a relationship song. I don't know why people don't realise that it's an anger song. You're right, they think it's a longing song. But it's not a song about 'I wish you'd come back' but 'You'll wish you were back!'"

In 2007 Faulkner said: "'I Want You Back' was one of the few songs of mine to ever be covered by another artist, a fellow mysteriously named Simon F, produced by Billy Idol's then-guitarist Steve Stevens. Some writers refer to their creations as their 'children', well this felt more akin to having your child grow up to be a serial killer. Their (per)version was not a hit, but then neither was ours."

== Track listing ==
7" single (BTS1077)

1. "I Want You Back" (Dave Faulkner) — 2:45
2. "Who Do You Love?" (Ellas McDaniel a.k.a. Bo Diddley) — 2:05

== Personnel ==
Credits

- James Baker — drums
- Clyde Bramley — bass, vocals
- Dave Faulkner — vocals, guitar
- Brad Shepherd — guitar, vocals
- Producer, Engineer — Alan Thorne
- Mixed — Alan Thorne (track 2)
- Recorded — Peter Watts (track 2)

== Charts ==
Chart (1984)	Peak position
Australian (Kent Music Report)	68
UK Indie	11
