= Blue Cave (album) =

In Blue Cave

Studio album by Hoodoo Gurus
- Released: May 1996
- Genre: Rock
- Length: 44:56
- Label: Mushroom
- Producers: Charles Fisher, Hoodoo Gurus

Hoodoo Gurus chronology
Crank (1994)	In Blue Cave (1996)	Hoodoo Voodoo (1997)

Singles from Blue Cave
- 1. "Big Deal" Released: February 1996; 2. "Waking up Tired" Released: April 1996; 3. "If Only..." Released: August 1996; 4. "Down on Me" Released: January 1997

Professional ratings
Review scores
Source	Rating
Allmusic	2.5/5 stars

US (Zoo Entertainment) Cover of Blue Cave

Cover of Blue Cave 2005 re-release

Blue Cave or In Blue Cave is the seventh studio album by Australian rock group Hoodoo Gurus. The album was released in May 1996 and peaked at number 18 on the ARIA charts.

At the ARIA Music Awards of 1996, the album was nominated for Best Pop Release.

EMI re-released the album on 6 February 2005 with six additional tracks, a fold out poster and liner notes by Charles Fisher, the record producer.

The album title Blue Cave originates from a brothel named "Gruta Azul" that they visited when touring in Porto Alegre, Brazil. The brothel which inspired the title is still open until the present date.

== Track listing ==
All tracks are written by Dave Faulkner, except where noted

No.	Title	Writer(s)	Length
1.	"Big Deal"	Faulkner, Brad Shepherd	3:39
2.	"Down on Me"		3:25
3.	"Mine"		3:30
4.	"Waking Up Tired"	Faulkner, Shepherd	2:54
5.	"Please Yourself"		3:40
6.	"If Only..."		3:44
7.	"Mind the Spider"		2:29
8.	"Why?"		1:47
9.	"All I Know"	Shepherd	4:05
10.	"Get High!"		3:54
11.	"Always Something"		3:01
12.	"Son-Of-A-Gun"		4:07
13.	"Night Must Fall"		4:41

2005 re-release
No.	Title	Writer(s)	Length
14.	"Monterey Sunset"	Shepherd	4:28
15.	"Concerto for Choppers Parts 1, 2 & 3”: "I. Chickie Run"; "II. Phreaks Go West"; "III. Spahn Ranch"	Shepherd	6:30
16.	"Quicksand"		3:33
17.	"Breakfast at Stephanie's"		3:24
18.	"It's Too Slow"		4:35
19.	"Exorcist"		4:16
20.	"The Ramones Medley (live)"		5:36

== Personnel ==
Credits:

- Dave Faulkner – lead vocals (except track 9), guitar, keyboards
- Richard Grossman – bass guitar, backing vocals
- Mark Kingsmill – drums
- Brad Shepherd – guitar, harmonica, backing vocals, lead vocals (track 9)
- Engineer – Paul McKercher
- Assistant engineer – Robin Gist
- Mastering – Bob Ludwig
- Mixer – Kevin Shirley
- Assistant mixer – Louis Mitchell
- Producers – Charles Fisher, Hoodoo Gurus

== Charts ==
Chart (1996)	Peak position
Australian Albums (ARIA)	18

== Certifications ==
Region	Certification	Certified units/sales
Australia (ARIA)	Gold	35,000^{^}
^{^} Shipments figures based on certification alone.

=== More Electric Soup video ===
"More Electric Soup" was a VHS video that accompanied a limited release of "Blue Cave" in a unique gatefold picture box. It included the eight music videos that had been made by the band since the 1992 video compilation, Electric Soup, excluding "Turn Up Your Radio" with Masters Apprentices. "Spahn Ranch" was the only inclusion not to be released as a single. "Down on Me" was the only Blue Cave single not to appear on the compilation, as it was released the following year.

1. "Waking Up Tired" (music video directed by John Whitteron)
2. "If Only" (music video directed by John Whitteron)
3. "Big Deal" (music video directed by John Whitteron)
4. "The Right Time" (music video directed by Jonathan Ogilvie)
5. "You Open My Eyes" (music video directed by Kimble Rendall)
6. "Less Than A Feeling" (music video directed by John Whitteron)
7. "Nobody" (music video directed by Jonathan Ogilvie)
8. "Spahn Ranch" (music video directed by John Whitteron)
