= Leilani (song) =

Single by Hoodoo Gurus

Single by Hoodoo Gurus
- B-side: "Leilani Pt. 2 (My Love Is a Red Red Rock)"
- Released: October 1982
- Studio: EMI 301 Studio, Sydney
- Genre: Garage punk
- Length: 5:36 (album version); 4:52 (single version)
- Label: Phantom
- Songwriters: James Baker; Dave Faulkner; Roddy Radalj; Kimble Rendall
- Producers: Le Hoodoo Gurus; Martin Fabinyi

Hoodoo Gurus singles chronology
"Leilani" (1982)	"Tojo" (1983)

"Leilani" is the debut single by Australian rock group Hoodoo Gurus when they were called Le Hoodoo Gurus, released on Phantom Records in October 1982. It had been written by all four members: James Baker, Dave Faulkner, Roddy Radalj and Kimble Rendall. Rendall left shortly before its release and, not long after, the band dropped the 'Le' to become Hoodoo Gurus. Le Hoodoo Gurus were noted for having three guitars and no bass player, creating a distinctive, layered sound. This was captured on "Leilani", which told the story of a maiden sacrificed to the gods and an erupting volcano while her true love looked on helplessly. A re-recorded version of the song was later released on Hoodoo Gurus' first album Stoneage Romeos (1984).

"Astute listeners will note the absence of bass guitar in the band... "Leilani" was based on an old 50s movie, Bird of Paradise starring Jeff Chandler..." - Dave Faulkner.

== Details ==
Backing vocals are ascribed to Orphan Rock and to The Three Sisters. Both The Three Sisters and Orphan Rock are geological features of The Blue Mountains near Katoomba, New South Wales.

The single was re-released by Big Time Records in 1985, as part of a limited edition collection of the band's first six singles, together with "Tojo", "My Girl", "I Want You Back, "Bittersweet", and "Like Wow - Wipeout"

"Leilani" was performed by The Living End on the 2005 tribute album Stoneage Cameos (see Stoneage Romeos); while "Leilani Part 2" was performed by The Sailors.

== Plot ==
Leilani is a beautiful maiden and daughter of an island chief. She leads an idyllic life with her boyfriend until she is compelled to be cast into the volcano as a tribal sacrifice to placate the mountain god. Despite her boyfriend's pleas, she chooses the path of duty.

Her boyfriend, alone and bereft, observes that at least her death served a purpose while his life is a waste.

== Track listing ==
7-inch single (PH15)

1. "Leilani" (Faulkner, Baker, Radalj, Rendall) — 4:52
2. "Leilani Part Two" aka "My Love is a Red Red Rock" (Faulkner) — 4:00

== Personnel ==
Credited to:

- James Baker — Drums
- Dave Faulkner — Vocals, guitar
- Roddy Radalj — Vocals, guitar
- Kimble Rendall — Vocals, guitar
- Orphan Rock — Backing vocals
- The Three Sisters — Backing vocals (Lynn, Sue and Joy Howard)
- Mixer — Graham "Buzz" Bidstrup (later a member of GANGgajang)
- Engineers — Gerry, Michael, Jonathan & Buzz
- Producers — Le Hoodoo Gurus, Martin Fabinyi
