= Chariot of the Gods (album) =

Studio album by Hoodoo Gurus
- Released: 11 March 2022
- Recorded: 2019–2021
- Genre: Power pop
- Length: 49:49
- Label: Big Time
- Producer: Dave Faulkner; Wayne Connolly

Hoodoo Gurus chronology
Gravy Train (2014)	Chariot of the Gods (2022)

Singles from Chariot of the Gods
- 1. "Answered Prayers" Released: 12 December 2019; 2. "Get Out of Dodge" Released: 4 October 2020; 3. "World of Pain" Released: 21 May 2021; 4. "Carry On" Released: 5 December 2021

Chariot of the Gods ratings
Review scores
Source	Rating
AllMusic	4/5 stars
American Songwriter	4/5 stars
The Sydney Morning Herald	3.5/5 stars

Chariot of the Gods is the tenth studio album by Australian rock group Hoodoo Gurus, released on 11 March 2022. It is the first studio album by the band since Purity of Essence in 2010.

Upon announcement Dave Faulkner said:

The last two years have been frustrating and nerve-racking for everyone, but for the Hoodoo Gurus, this dark cloud has had a silver lining. Forced to rely on ourselves instead of the outside world for validation, there has been a creative rebirth within the band that has resulted in a new album. Most important of all, the musical bonds between the four of us have never been stronger. When the discussions are all about which songs we're sad about having to leave off the record, that's a damn good sign. I'm tellin' ya, folks, we've got a real spring in our step right now.

The album was performed in its entirety for the first time via an exclusive live special event recording from Damien Gerard Studios on the NSW Central Coast on 10 March 2022.

The album's vinyl release was pushed back to 31 April due to COVID-19-related supply chain issues.

== Track listing ==
The vinyl version features three bonus tracks: "Hung Out to Dry", the B-side of the "Get Out of Dodge" single (and a single in its own right) and covers of Bob Dylan's "Obviously Five Believers" and Lennon/McCartney's "I Wanna Be Your Man".

All tracks are written by David Faulkner.

Chariot of the Gods track listing
No.	Title	Length
1.	"Early Opener"	0:57
2.	"World of Pain"	3:44
3.	"Get Out of Dodge"	3:36
4.	"Answered Prayers"	3:36
5.	"Was I Supposed to Care?"	4:33
6.	"Hang with the Girls"	2:56
7.	"My Imaginary Friend"	4:08
8.	"Equinox"	3:04
9.	"Chariots of the Gods"	5:10
10.	"Carry On"	2:44
11.	"I Come from Your Future"	3:01
12.	"Don't Try to Save My Soul"	4:07
13.	"Settle Down"	3:23
14.	"Got to Get You Out of My Life"	4:50
Total length:		49:49

All tracks are written by David Faulkner, except where noted.

Chariot of the Gods track listing – Vinyl edition
No.	Title	Writer(s)	Length
1.	"Early Opener"		0:57
2.	"World of Pain"		3:44
3.	"Get Out of Dodge"		3:36
4.	"Answered Prayers"		3:36
5.	"Was I Supposed to Care?"		4:33
6.	"Hang with the Girls"		2:56
7.	"My Imaginary Friend"		4:08
8.	"Equinox"		3:04
9.	"Chariots of the Gods"		5:10
10.	"Carry On"		2:44
11.	"Hung Out to Dry"		3:34
12.	"Obviously Five Believers"	Bob Dylan
13.	"I Wanna Be Your Man"	Lennon–McCartney
14.	"I Come from Your Future"		3:01
15.	"Don't Try to Save My Soul"		4:07
16.	"Settle Down"		3:23
17.	"Got to Get You Out of My Life"		4:50

== Personnel ==
Hoodoo Gurus

- Dave Faulkner – vocals, guitar, production
- Brad Shepherd – guitar
- Rick Grossman – bass guitar
- Nik Rieth – drums

Additional personnel

- Wayne Connolly – production (1–3, 5–14), engineering (all tracks)
- Leon Zervos – mastering
- Ed Stasium – mixing

== Charts ==
Chart performance for Chariot of the Gods
Chart (2022)	Peak position
Australian Albums (ARIA)	7
