= Southend (band) =

Australian house-techno band

- Origin: Sydney, New South Wales, Australia
- Genres: Techno; house; electronica
- Years active: 1992–1997; 2003–present
- Labels: Volition; Nettwerk; Yep!
- Members: Stuart McCarthy; Steve Younan; Melinda Page
- Past members: Sameer Sengupta; Justin Frew

Southend (also styled as South End) is an Australian house-techno band formed in 1992. The group consisted of synthesiser-keyboardists Stuart McCarthy, Steve Younan, Sameer Sengupta, and vocalist Melinda Page. Their single, "The Winner Is..." (June 1994), reached the ARIA Singles Chart Top 10. Sengupta was replaced by Justin Frew on guitar in 1995. The group disbanded in 1997 and reunited in 2003 as a trio, McCarthy, Page, and Younan.

== History ==
Southend was formed in Sydney in 1992 by Stuart McCarthy on synthesiser and keyboards, Melinda Page on vocals, Sameer Sengupta and Steve Younan (both on synthesiser and keyboards). Their debut release was a four-track, 12-inch single, "600 Miles from Nowhere" (1992) via Volition Records. The group issued a six-track extended play, Fanatical, in 1993 on Volition Records/Second Nature, which provided another 12-inch single, "Get Down", later that year. The EP was recorded at Sony Music Studios (Sydney) and D.T.U., with the group producing. McCarthy provided guitar and programming, Sengupta on machine effects and programming, Page and Younan were both on vocals and keyboards.

"The Winner Is...", a single by Southend with Nik Fish (a.k.a. Nik Vatoff), an Australian trance DJ, appeared in June 1994. It was co-written by McCarthy, Sengupta and Vatoff. The lyrics are based around a sample of the speech by International Olympic Committee chairman, Juan Antonio Samaranch, when announcing the winner of the 2000 Summer Olympics bid, as "Syd-er-ney". The single reached No. 9 on the ARIA Charts.

Southend issued a re-mix album, Fanatically Remixed, in 1994 with eleven tracks. The group have performed at the annual Big Day Out, from 1993 to 1996. Sengupta left in 1995 to start his solo career, he was replaced by a guitarist, Justin Frew.

Southend has produced local and international releases for Hoodoo Gurus, Paul Holden, Acid Babies, the Whitlams, Kim Salmon, and Michal Nicholas. They undertook a remix collaboration with Sasha Vatoff on Vagen's track, "Buggin", and a cover of Bronski Beat's "Smalltown Boy", which appeared on Groovescooter Records' compilation album by various artists, Re:fashioned 2.

After disbanding in 1997, Frew and McCarthy formed Antenna with Dave Faulkner (of Hoodoo Gurus) on lead vocals and guitar, and Salmon (ex-the Cheap Nasties, the Manikins, the Scientists, Beasts of Bourbon) on vocals and guitar in 1998. Antenna's sole album, Installation (1998), was the first release on Mushroom International. That group broke up early in the following year.

Southend reformed in 2004 to perform at Utopia on Near Years Eve in Sydney. They were the first band to appear live on Channel V's "Room 208". After three tracks licensed by Ministry of Sound (Australia) in 2009, Undercover Music's Yep! Records has released Southend's entire back catalogue (including previously unreleased material) through MGM Distribution and iTunes.

== Discography ==
=== Albums ===
List of albums, with selected chart positions
Title	Album details	Peak chart positions
Title	Album details	AUS
Fanatical	Released: 1993; Label: Volition Records/Sony (VOLTCD74); Note: mini-album	138
Fanatically Remixed	Released: October 1994; Label: Volition Records/Sony (VOLTCD114); Note: remix albums	124
Compilation	Released: 2000; Label: Volition Records/Sony Dance (5010202000); Note: compilation albums	—

=== Singles ===
List of singles, with selected chart positions
Title	Year	Peak chart positions
Title	Year	AUS
"600 Miles from Nowhere"	1992	—
"Get Down" (12-inch)	1993	—
"Take Me Up"	1993	175
"The Winner Is..." (with Nik Fish)	1994	9
"If You Believe"	1994	108
"Confession" / "The Dream"	1995	199
"Skylark" (12-inch)	1996	—
"The Winner Is..." (2000 remix; with Nik Fish)	2000	69
"Buggin'" (vs Vagen)	2003	—
"To Deserve You" (featuring Michal Nicolas)	2004	—
"Der Grun Apfel" (with Eddie Bech)	2009	—
