= Ghostwriters (band) =

Australian rock band

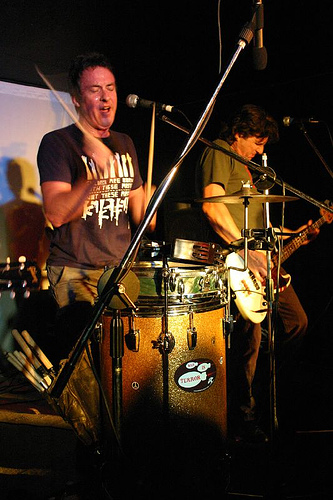

Background information
- Also known as: Rob Hirst and The Ghostwriters
- Origin: Sydney, New South Wales, Australia
- Genre: Rock
- Years active: 1990–2026
- Labels: Virgin, Mercury, Ghostwriters, Sony BMG
- Members: Rob Hirst; Richard Grossman
- Website: Official website

Ghostwriters (aka Rob Hirst & the Ghostwriters and sometimes referred to as Ghosties by fans) are an Australian rock band formed in Sydney in 1990, principally involving Midnight Oil drummer Rob Hirst and Hoodoo Gurus bassist Richard Grossman. Their highest-charting single was "Someone's Singing New York New York" (1991) written by Hirst. It reached No. 29 on the ARIA Australian Singles Chart.

== History ==
=== Formation ===
In Sydney in 1990, while Midnight Oil were taking a break, Hirst joined up with guitarist Andrew Dickson (The Narcs, NZ), drummer Dorland Bray (Do-Ré-Mi), guitarist Leszek Karski (Midnight Oil producer) and Hoodoo Gurus' Grossman to form a side project called Ghostwriters. The name refers to ghostwriters where famous writers wish to be anonymous. Ghostwriters' line-ups – both live and in the studio – changed considerably through the years, with only founders Hirst and Grossman being mainstays (and their driving force) at all times. Between successive album releases Hirst and Grossman returned to active involvement with Midnight Oil and Hoodoo Gurus respectively.

=== 1991: Debut album ===
The first album, Ghostwriters (1991), was released by Virgin Records and its credits illustrated the Ghostwriters concept as it did not list any band member's name. Session musicians were acknowledged by their first name and a single initial for the surname. (Later re-release of the album included band member names.) The album reached No. 96 on the Australian album charts. "Someone's Singing New York New York" was released as a single with the statement "written, played and produced by ghostwriters", the single reaching No. 29 on the Australian singles charts.

=== 1996: Second Skin ===
Second Skin followed on Mercury Records in 1996. By that time, Ghostwriters consisted primarily of Hirst and Grossman whose names were – along with those of the numerous guest musicians – now also listed in the album's liner notes. Videos were produced for the two tracks "Impossible Shame" and "Second Skin", but – as with the debut record – sales of the album as well as the singles fell short of the record company's expectations and the contract was not renewed. Consequently, the first two Ghostwriters albums went out of print quickly and were not available for the most part of the 1990s.

=== 1999: Fibromoon ===
In 1999, Ghostwriters (now called Rob Hirst & The Ghostwriters) released Fibromoon. The band released it independently, on Ghostwriters Records, which meant that it was only available at a select number of stores, including some online outlets. Along with Fibromoon, the group re-released their two previous albums (with slightly altered artwork) through the same outlets. By 2006, all Ghostwriters albums were once again out of print and no longer available.

=== 2006: Political Animal ===
After a longer recording hiatus (during which the band did play a number of live sessions in various Sydney pubs), Ghostwriters started recording again in late 2006. The resulting album, Political Animal (2007), dropped the "Rob Hirst &" prefix and was released in Australia on 14 April 2007. It was released by Sony BMG Australia (also Midnight Oil's record company), marking the first time in over ten years that a Ghostwriters album became available through a major record company. Political Animal saw Hirst's former Midnight Oil musician Martin Rotsey formally join the band, and the title track features former Midnight Oil keyboard/guitarist Jim Moginie. Political Animal collects four new songs along with eight previously released tracks, with some partly re-recorded.

While Midnight Oil were rumoured to be reuniting again for the Australian leg of the Live Earth concerts in July 2007, this was not to be the case. However, Ghostwriters did perform, playing their own songs "World is Almost at Peace" and "Second Skin" followed by the Midnight Oil classic "When The Generals Talk".

=== Further Contributors ===
Over the years, several other musicians contributed to Ghostwriters, both live and in studio. These include Warne Livesey (former Midnight Oil producer), Peter West, Hirst's brother Stephen Hirst, Brad Shepherd (Hoodoo Gurus), Charlie McMahon, as well as Jeremy Smith, Jack Howard and Michael Waters (all three from Hunters and Collectors). Hirst's fellow Midnight Oil members Jim Moginie and Bones Hillman made guest appearances at live gigs; both also contributed to Ghostwriters songs Moginie plays keyboards on the track "Political Animal" (2007), while Hillman sang backup vocals on the song "Neon Garden" from the Fibromoon. Oils guitarist Martin Rotsey had been a guest musician at a number of Ghostwriters concerts before officially joining in 2006. Hirst's bandmate from Backsliders, guitarist Dom Turner contributed to the "Second Skin" (1996) album.

== Members ==
=== Core members ===
- Rob Hirst – vocals, guitar, keyboard, drums, percussion
- Rick Grossman – bass, guitar, vocals

In addition to mainstays Hirst and Grossman, Ghostwriters consisted of:

=== Additional personnel ===
credited to:

- Andrew Dickson – guitar
- Dorland Bray (former Do-Ré-Mi drummer) – acoustic guitar, drums, vocals
- Leszek Karski (former Midnight Oil producer) – guitar
- Brad Shepherd (Hoodoo Gurus) – harmonica
- Glad Reed – (red ochre) -trombone
- David "DB" Claringbold (red ochre) – acoustic guitar
- Stephen Hirst – piano, Hammond organ
- Dom Turner (Backsliders) — slide guitar

== Discography ==
=== Studio albums ===
List of studio albums, with selected chart positions and certifications
Title	Album details	Peak chart positions
Title	Album details	AUS
Ghostwriters	Released: November 1991; Label: Virgin (VOZCD2055); Format: CD, cassette	96
Second Skin	Released: August 1996; Label: Ghostwriters (GH002) / Mercury (5321992); Format: CD	156
Fibromoon (as Rob Hirst and The Ghostwriters )	Released: 1999; Label: Ghostwriters (GH003); Format: CD	—
Political Animal	Released: April 2007; Label: Sony BMG (88697 07936 2); Format: CD	—

=== Singles ===
List of singles, with selected chart positions and certifications
Title	Year	Peak chart positions	Album
Title	Year	AUS	Album
"Someone's Singing New York New York"	1991	29	Ghostwriters
"Runaway Bay"	1992	117	Ghostwriters
"World Is Almost at Peace"	1992	135	Ghostwriters
"Second Skin"	1996	167	Second Skin
"Impossible Shame"	1996	146	Second Skin
"Start The Day" (promo)	2007	-	Political Animal
