= Stoneage Romeos =

Studio album by Hoodoo Gurus
- Released: March 1984
- Studio: Trafalgar
- Genre: Cowpunk; garage rock
- Length: 37:23
- Label: Big Time
- Producer: Alan Thorne

Hoodoo Gurus chronology
Stoneage Romeos (1984)	Mars Needs Guitars! (1985)

Alternative cover
- US cover

Singles from Stoneage Romeos
- 1. "Leilani" Released: October 1982; 2. "Tojo" Released: June 1983; 3. "My Girl" Released: October 1983; 4. "I Want You Back" Released: March 1984

Professional ratings
Review scores
Source	Rating
AllMusic	4.5/5 stars
PopMatters	8/10
Uncut	4/5 stars
The Village Voice	B+

Stoneage Romeos is the debut album by Australian rock group Hoodoo Gurus. Released in March 1984 by Big Time Records in Australia, the album's release saw them receive record sales to complement their already strong reputation for live performances. With radio and television support for their third single "My Girl" (1983), complete with a film clip about a greyhound of the same name, the band's following grew. The album's other singles were "Leilani", "Tojo" and "I Want You Back". The album peaked at number 29 on the Australian charts.

The band won "Best Debut Album" at the 1984 Countdown Awards.

A&M Records released the album in the United States on 7 September 1984.

Stoneage Romeos was re-released by Arcadia Records on 1 October 2002, with two additional tracks, "Hoodoo You Love" and "Be My Guru". EMI also re-released the album on 24 October 2005 with three bonus tracks, "Leilani Pt. 2", "Be My Guru" and "Hoodoo You Love", a fold-out poster and liner notes by Lindsay "The Doctor" McDougall of Frenzal Rhomb.

In October 2010, the album was listed in the top 30 in the book, 100 Best Australian Albums.

== Release ==
The title Stoneage Romeos is taken from a Three Stooges short film. The Australian LP, designed by Yanni Stumbles, sported a cartoonish nod to the 1966 caveman flick One Million Years B.C., all menacing dinosaurs and Day-Glo colors, whilst in America, consumers got a stylized sleeve featuring arty renditions of the giant reptiles. On the change of covers, the band's frontman Dave Faulkner would later recall:

Bad coffeetable art, very anonymous and boring. On the U.S. tour fans are bringing up the Australian copies for us to sign—they were all getting them on import! Yet at the end of the tour, A&M says to us, ‘Oh well, we don't really think the cover will affect sales at all.’ Like, when they’re right, they’re right, and when they’re wrong, they’re still right.

== Track listing ==
=== Australian release ===
All tracks are written by Dave Faulkner, except where noted

Stoneage Romeos track listing
No.	Title	Writer(s)	Length
1.	"(Let's All) Turn On"	James Baker, Darcy Condon, Faulkner, Roddy Radalj	3:04
2.	"I Want You Back"		3:12
3.	"Arthur"	Faulkner, Radalj	3:10
4.	"Death Ship"	Faulkner, Radalj, Alan Sharples	2:37
5.	"Dig It Up"		3:36
6.	"My Girl"		2:40
7.	"Zanzibar"		3:25
8.	"Leilani"	Faulkner, Baker, Radalj, Kimble Rendall	5:36
9.	"Tojo"		3:23
10.	"In the Echo Chamber"		3:44
11.	"I Was a Kamikaze Pilot"		3:12

2002 re-release
No.	Title	Writer(s)	Length
12.	"Hoodoo You Love" aka "Who Do You Love"	Ellas McDaniel	2:09
13.	"Be My Guru"	Baker, Faulkner	2:40

2005 re-release
No.	Title	Writer(s)	Length
12.	"Leilani, Pt. 2"		3:58
13.	"Be My Guru"	Baker, Faulkner	2:40
14.	"Hoodoo You Love" (recorded live by Triple J at the Trade Union Club in Sydney in 1983)	Bo Diddley	2:07

=== US release ===
Side A
No.	Title	Length
1.	"I Want You Back"	3:12
2.	"Tojo"	3:23
3.	"Leilani"	5:36
4.	"Arthur"	3:10
5.	"Dig It Up"	3:36

Side B
No.	Title	Length
1.	"(Let's All) Turn On"	3:04
2.	"Death Ship"	2:37
3.	"In The Echo Chamber"	3:44
4.	"Zanzibar"	3:25
5.	"I Was a Kamikaze Pilot"	3:12
6.	"My Girl"	2:40

== Personnel ==
Credited to:

- James Baker – drums
- Clyde Bramley – bass, vocals
- Dave Faulkner – guitar, lead vocals, keyboards
- Brad Shepherd – lead guitar, vocals, harmonica, percussion
- Michael Farmer – additional percussion
- Alan Thorne – producer and engineer
- Bob Carbone – mastering
- Frank DeLuna – mastering
- Yanni Stumbles – artwork (cover concept and design)
- Tom Takacs – photography
- Stuart Thorne – other ("the boss")

== Charts ==
Chart performance for Stoneage Romeos
Chart (1984)	Peak position
Australian Albums (Kent Music Report)	29
New Zealand Albums (RMNZ)	32
Swedish Albums (Sverigetopplistan)	38

2024 chart performance for Stoneage Romeos (40th anniversary edition)
Chart (1984)	Peak position
Australian Albums (ARIA)	8

== Certifications ==
Certifications for Stoneage Romeos
Region	Certification	Certified units/sales
Australia (ARIA)	Gold	35,000^{^}
^{^} Shipments figures based on certification alone.

== See also ==
- Stoneage Cameos – a 2005 tribute album, featuring cover versions of all of Stoneage Romeos' songs by 14 other Australian bands
