= The Manikins =

Australian punk rock and new wave band

- Also known as: Cheap Nasties
- Origin: Perth, Western Australia, Australia
- Genres: Punk, new wave
- Years active: 1976–1981
- Past members: Kim Salmon; Neil Fernandes; Ken Seymour; Mark Betts; Robbie Porritt; Dave Faulkner; Dan Dare; Bradley Clark

The Manikins were an Australian punk rock and new wave band from Perth, Western Australia. Founding mainstay Mark Betts (drums) was joined by various lead vocalists, Robert Porritt, Christine Bodey and Christine Anne Trent. They issued a self-titled album in 1988 before disbanding in the early 1990s.

== History ==
The Manikins were formed in August 1976 in Perth as a punk rock band Cheap Nasties by Mark Betts on drums, Dan Dare on bass guitar and vocals, Neil Fernandes on guitar and vocals, Robert Porritt on vocals and Kim Salmon on guitar and vocals. Their debut gig was at The Rivervale Hotel in mid-1977. The Cheap Nasties claimed to be Perth's first punk band. Salmon left Cheap Nasties in December 1977 to join the Invaders and then formed the Scientists.

The rest of the band with Ken Seymour replacing Dare on bass guitar continued as Manikins. The raw sound of Cheap Nasties gave way to a poppier, new wave-oriented musical direction with tougher post-punk power pop. They issued two singles, "I Never Thought I'd Find Someone Who Would Be So Kind" (November 1978) and "Premonition" (August 1979). The group toured Australia's eastern states, "but was met with virtual indifference". Dave Faulkner p.k.a. Dave Flick (ex-the Victims) joined on keyboards late in 1979. They issued another single, "Love at Second Sight" (October 1980) before Flick left. As Dave Faulkner, he is a mainstay member of Sydney-based Hoodoo Gurus since 1981. Seymour also left and was replaced by Dan Dare.

Manikins had several residencies in Perth, including at the Broadway Tavern in Nedlands and the nightclub Hernando's Hideaway. They relocated to Melbourne in early 1980 but broke up in late 1981. In 1986 Mark Betts registered the Manikins name. Betts and Porritt formed another version of the group with Paul Blackbee on guitar and keyboards (ex-Screaming Fits) and Bradley Clark on guitar and bass guitar (ex-Billy Orphan's Tears). Porritt was replaced on lead vocals by Christine Bodey, Blackbee was replaced by Felipe Muraca on keyboards and bass guitar while Alexander Nettelbeck replaced Muraca on keyboards. Manikins released new romantic synth style recordings including a self-titled album in February 1988. Christine Anne Trent replaced Bodey on lead vocals. They disbanded in early 1990s.

In 2004 Kim Salmon was inducted into the West Australian Music Industry Association Hall of Fame. In 2007 Salmon was inducted into the Music Victoria Awards Hall of Fame. A retrospective compilation album, From Broadway to Blazes, was issued in February 2017. Tim Sendra of AllMusic rated it as four-out-of-five stars, writing:

singles that come at the beginning are the most immediate songs, jumping out of the speakers with live-wire energy. [... Those] recorded later show a little more sophistication and take a minute to reveal their charms [...].

== Members ==
- Mark Betts – drums, percussion
- Dan Dare – bass guitar, vocals
- Neil Fernandes – guitar, vocals
- Robert Porritt – lead vocals
- Kim Salmon – guitar, vocals
- Ken Seymour – bass guitar
- Dave Faulkner p.k.a. Dave Flick – keyboards
- Paul Blackbee – guitar, keyboards
- Bradley Clark – guitar, bass guitar
- Felipe (Phil) Muraca – bass guitar, keyboards
- Christine Bodey – lead vocals
- Alexander Nettelbeck – keyboards
- Christine Anne Trent – lead vocals

== Discography ==
=== Albums ===
- Live Locally - Inner City Sound (live album, cassette) (1979)
- Last Gasp - Inner City Sound (cassette) (1981)
- Manikins (February 1988)
- The Manikins - Two Tribes Records (compilation CD) (2004)
- From Broadway to Blazes (compilation, February 2017)

=== Singles ===
- "I Never Thought I'd Find Someone Who Would Be So Kind"/"Radio World" - Independent (7") (SMX-46904) (November 1978)
- "Premonition"/"Laugh Too Loud" - Independent (7") (SMX-46969) (August 1979)
- "Love at Second Sight"/"Nuisance"/"All I Care About" - Independent (7") (SMX-55051) (October 1980)
- "What Are You On?"/"Dictator's Dream" (July 1986)
- "Cruel World"/"Dracula's Slut" (November 1987) #52
- "Scent"/"Life Underground" (May 1988)
