= Even (band) =

Australian band

- Origin: Melbourne, Victoria, Australia
- Genres: Indie rock, rock
- Years active: 1994–present
- Labels: Rubber/Shock, BMG, El Reno
- Members: Matthew Cotter; Wally Kempton; Ashley Naylor
- Website: even.com.au

Even are an Australian indie rock three-piece band fronted by singer-songwriter-guitarist, Ashley Naylor with Matthew Cotter on drums and Wally Kempton (also known as Wally Meanie) on bass guitar and backing vocals. They formed in March 1994 and played regularly around the live music scene and toured both nationally and internationally. They have released eight studio albums, Less Is More (1996), Come Again (1998), A Different High (2001), Free Kicks (2004), Even (2007), In Another Time (2011), Satin Returns (2018), and Reverse Light Years (2021).

== History ==
=== 1994–1995: Formation and early EPs ===
Future members of Even, Matthew Cotter on drums and Ashley Naylor on lead vocals and lead guitar, played music together at a high school in Melbourne. They formed an indie band, The Swarm, with Francis Leach on vocals and David Rowland on bass guitar. The Swarm issued three independent singles between November 1988 and April 1991 before disbanding. In March 1994 Cotter and Naylor were joined by Roderick "Wally" Kempton (also a member of The Meanies, as Wally Meanie) on bass guitar to form an indie guitar pop group, Even. Even played their first gig in March 1994 at the Empress of India Hotel in Fitzroy. Ten years later Naylor told Michael Dwyer of The Age that "It was very exciting, because we did a soundcheck and people were applauding us... We were bristling to play, absolutely bursting with energy. Flaming youth, Kiss would have called it."

Even signed to an independent label, Rubber Records. In May 1995 Even issued a six-track extended play, In Stereo, distributed by Shock Records. It was produced by Andy Baldwin, Andy O'Beirne, Lindsay Gravina and Bruce Mowson. National youth radio station, Triple J, added the track, "24 Hour Cynic", to high rotation. In late 1996 they provided a live-in-the-studio version of "24 Hour Cynic" for a various artists' compilation, Triple J – Live. Even followed in November 1995 with a five-track EP, Ten to Forty-Six, which included the lead track, "Stupid Dream".

=== 1996–2003: Less Is More, Come Again and A Different High ===
Even released their debut studio album, Less Is More on 10 June 1996 via Rubber Records/Shock Records. It was co-produced by Even with Greg Wales (Drop City) and mixed by Wales with Nick Launay. Australian musicologist, Ian McFarlane, felt it was "brimming with exceptional tunes ('Karmic Flop', 'Stop and Go Man', 'Dear Morris', 'She Told Me So' and 'Eternal Teen' to name but a handful), a timeless feel and pop hooks by the truckload." He declared that the group had released "one of the best Australian debut albums of 1996." Less Is More provided three singles, "Don't Wait" (June), "Stop and Go Man" (September) and "Peaches and Cream" (February 1997). After supporting international acts, The Presidents of the United States, The Posies, Ash and Everclear, in Australia; Even toured the United States and then Europe from March 1997. At the ARIA Music Awards of 1997 in September Less Is More was nominated for Best Independent Release.

In November 1997 they issued a third EP, One Side Not, with four tracks. It was recorded at Seed Studios by Wales with Tim Johnston. The group issued their second studio album, Come Again, on 28 September 1998, which was produced by Tony Lash (The Dandy Warhols, Eric Matthews). McFarlane felt it "fulfilled the promise of the debut with its full quota of bright guitar melodies and top-flight songs." AllMusic's James Damas described it as "one of the most overlooked and consistent rock & roll albums of the late '90s." Tim Rogers of fellow Australian group, You Am I, quipped that it was his "favourite Beatles album". It provided three singles, "No Surprises" (August 1998), "Black Umbrella" (November) and "Sunshine Comes" (September 1999).

From early 1999 Naylor collaborated with alternative country artist, Sherry Rich, to form a folk pop duo, The Grapes. They issued a self-titled album in October which McFarlane observed was "full of rich sixties melodies, catchy guitar hooks, perfect harmonies, jangling guitars and country influences." Even's third studio album, A Different High, was issued on 14 May 2001, which peaked at No. 48 on the ARIA Albums Chart, and reached No. 10 on the ARIA Alternative Albums Chart. Guesting on the album were Renée Geyer on vocals, Graham Lee (ex-The Triffids) on pedal steel guitar and Bruce Haymes (of Paul Kelly Band) on organ, piano and Wurlitzer.

Damas opined that for A Different High, "the scales begin to tip more heavily toward the more bloated side of '70s classic rock and away from modern pop." David Simons of OnStage Magazine noticed that it "finds Naylor sharpening the hooks, tightening the grooves, and multiplying the guitar sounds like never before. The result is an album's worth of the most tuneful pop you're likely to find on any continent." The album's lead single, "Shining Star" (April 2001), peaked at No. 21 on the ARIA Alternative Singles Chart.

=== 2004–2017: Free Kicks, Even & In Another Time ===
Their fourth studio album, Free Kicks, was released on 6 June 2004 on their own label, El Reno Records. They had recorded some of the tracks in the United Kingdom in 2002. Dwyer declared that it "spearheads a new lease of life for Even... it features a couple of guest appearances by former Small Faces/Faces keyboard player Ian McLagan and follows a watershed London adventure." For the Hoodoo Gurus tribute album, Stoneage Cameos (August 2005), Even covered "Arthur", with Kempton as co-executive producer with Jason Evans.

Ned Raggett of AllMusic reviewed their self-titled, fifth studio album which showed they "love their Beatles, their ELO, their power pop, their hints of roots music appreciation. It's all in there and they're not only not hiding it; they revel in it." Even was issued in 2007, which the group co-produced with Wayne Connolly (You Am I).

In June 2008 Even's debut album Less Is More was voted number 30 of the greatest Australian albums ever in a poll by The Age readers.

Even released their sixth studio album, In Another Time, on 9 December 2011. Mess+Noise's Patrick Emery felt it displayed how "a celebration of the glorious riffs, melodies and elegant style of the '60s and '70s doesn’t need to be an exercise in turgid nostalgia." Edouard Morton of theDwarf.com.au caught their live gig in May 2012 at The Tote, where they "made an all out attempt to burst every eardrum with their endlessly popular, and recognisably Melbourne power rock."

In December 2014 the group celebrated their 14th annual Xmas Even at the Gasometer Hotel (in Collingwood) with Jasmin Kaset as their support act.

=== 2018-present: Satin Returns & Reverse Light Years ===
In May 2018, Even released their seventh studio album, Satin Returns. Even's eighth studio album, Reverse Light Years was released in October 2021 and peaked at number 18 on the ARIA charts; the band's highest-charting album.

== Discography ==
=== Studio albums ===
| Title | Details | Peak chart positions |
| Title | Details | AUS |
|---|---|---|
| Less Is More | Released: 10 June 1996; Label: Rubber Records/Shock Records (RUB052); Format: CD, LP | 85 |
| Come Again | Released: 28 September 1998; Label: Rubber Records/Shock Records (74321617022); Format: CD | 57 |
| A Different High | Released: 14 May 2001; Label: Rubber Records (RUB125); Format: CD | 48 |
| Free Kicks | Released: June 2004; Label: El Reno Records/Shock Records (ER002); Format: CD | - |
| Even | Released: March 2007; Label: Rubber Records/EMI Music (RUB234); Format: CD | - |
| In Another Time | Released: December 2011; Label: El Reno Records (ER008); Format: CD, DD | - |
| Satin Returns | Released: May 2018; Label: El Reno Records (ER016); Format: CD, DD, LP, Streaming | - |
| Reverse Light Years | Released: 29 October 2021; Label: El Reno Records (655729640602); Format: CD, DD, LP, Streaming | 18 |

=== Compilation albums ===
| Title | Details |
|---|---|
| Salthill | Released: 1996 (Germany); Label: Subway Records (Germany) (7192238 WM 329/35114-42 ); Format: CD; Note: Combination of In Stereo & Ten to Forty-Six EPs |
| The Street Press Years | Released: August 2003; Label: Rubber Records (RUB157 ); Format: CD |
| First XVIII | Released: April 2013; Label: El Reno/ Rubber Records (ER008/RUB279); Format: CD, DD |
| Down the Shops | Released: 2020; Label: Cheersquad Records & Tapes (CRT031); Format: CD, LP |

=== Extended plays ===
| Title | Details |
|---|---|
| In Stereo | Released: May 1995; Label: Rubber Records/Shock Records (RUB043); Format: CD |
| Ten to Forty-Six | Released: November 1995; Label: Rubber Records/Shock Records (RUB049); Format: CD |
| One Side Not | Released: November 1997; Label: Rubber Records/Shock Records (743215259527); Format: CD |
| Return to Stardust | Released: June 2020; Label: Even; Format: DD, streaming |

=== Charting singles ===
| Title | Year | Peak positions | Album |
| Title | Year | AUS | Album |
|---|---|---|---|
| "Black Umbrella" | 1999 | 85 | Come Again |

== Awards and nominations ==
=== ARIA Music Awards ===
The ARIA Music Awards is an annual awards ceremony that recognises excellence, innovation, and achievement across all genres of Australian music. They commenced in 1987.

| Year | Nominee / work | Award | Result | Ref. |
|---|---|---|---|---|
| ARIA Music Awards of 1997 | Less Is More | Best Independent Release | Nominated | |
