= Shutterspeed =

- Origin: Brisbane, Queensland, Australia
- Genres: Independent rock
- Years active: 1998–2004
- Labels: Laughing Outlaw; Anvil
- Past members: Andrew Petersen; Anthony Dettori; Bruce Anthon; Morgan Wilson; Dan Alder; Scott Lapthorne; Matt Kofoa; Craig King

Shutterspeed were an Australian independent rock band which formed in Brisbane in 1998. They were fronted by Andrew Petersen on lead vocals and guitar, and released two albums, Hill Street Views (September 2001) and Custom Made Hit Parade (June 2003) before disbanding in 2004. They had high rotation radio airplay for their singles, "Good Little Monkey" (July 2001), "Come Out Swingin'" (December 2002) and "Under Control" (April 2003). Their live performances established a reputation for passionate, energetic and unpredictable shows, with the band creating exciting soul-infused rock; they often played long sets, throwing impromptu snippets of cover versions into their own songs. The line-up from their second album, Custom Made Hit Parade (June 2003), toured New Zealand in late 2003.

By mid-2004 the band had split, with guitarist Anthony Dettori and keyboardist Morgan Wilson forming The Newtown Jets and bass guitarist Dan Alder joining Shifter. Petersen, with drummer Scott Lapthorne and new bass player Matt Kafoa, continued as a three-piece Shutterspeed, recording the Turn to Black (2004) EP. Petersen and Kafoa relocated to the United Kingdom in mid-2005, playing as My Scarlet Darling with drummer Darren Lee and, following Kafoa's departure, bassist Wayne Myers. In late 2006 Petersen returned to Australia and in 2009 released a solo album, The Universe and Its Sense of Humour.

== Discography ==
=== Albums ===
- Hill Street Views (September 2001, Anvil Records)
- Custom Made Hit Parade (June 2003, Anvil Records)

=== EPs and singles ===
- Up Go the Shutters - Atmosphere In Here (March 1999)
- Well Ain't that Something a Good Thing's Comin' (November 1999, Laughing Outlaw Records)
- Fourteen Flights Up (September 2000)
- Good Little Monkey (July 2001, Anvil Records)
- So Far so Good (For Nothing) (March 2002, Anvil Records)
- Come Out Swingin' (December 2002, Anvil Records)
- Under Control (April 2003, Anvil Records)
- Feed the Fire (2003, Anvil Records)
- Turn to Black (2004, Anvil Records)
