= Roddy Radalj =

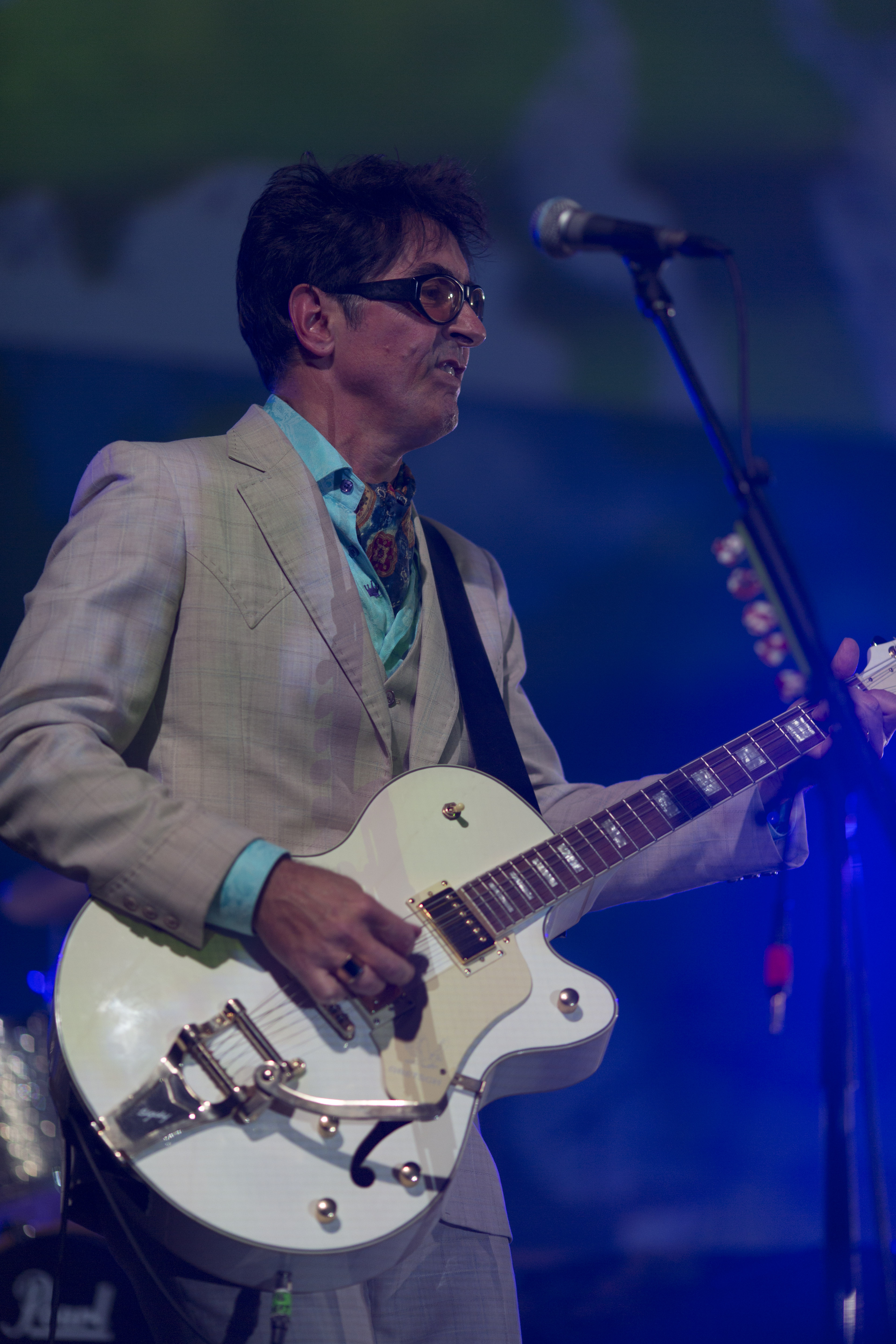
- May 2015

Background information
- Also known as: Roddy Ray'da
- Born: Rodney John Radalj; 1961 (age 64–65); Dubrovnik, PR Croatia, Yugoslavia
- Genre: Rock
- Occupations: Musician, guitarist, bassist, songwriter
- Years active: 1976–present

Rodney John Radalj (born c.1961) is a Croatian-born Australian musician and singer-songwriter. He has provided guitar, bass guitar and vocals in several influential Australian bands starting with Perth punk bands in the late 1970s before relocating to Sydney to become a founder of the Hoodoo Gurus in 1981 and of Dubrovniks in 1988. Since 1989, as Roddy Ray'da he has released a number of solo albums, including Guns Girls & Guitars in 2005.

== Biography ==
=== Perth punk bands ===
Born in Dubrovnik, Croatia, former Yugoslavia, Radalj got his start with Perth punk band The Exterminators who, via The Invaders, eventually became The Scientists in May 1978. Their earliest line-up were Kim Salmon (later a crucial member of the Beasts of Bourbon and The Surrealists) and ex-Victims drummer James Baker. Radalj stayed long enough in The Scientists to appear on their debut single, "Frantic Romantic", long regarded as one of the most collectable artefacts of the Australian punk rock era.

=== Sydney bands ===
His next band, The Rockets issued one single, "Mean Mistress" before Roddy relocated to Sydney where, in January 1981, he joined Baker, Dave Faulkner (another Perth expatriate and ex-leader of the Victims) and Kimble Rendall (ex-XL Capris) as founders of Le Hoodoo Gurus. Their debut single, "Leilani" on the Phantom label (October 1982) was an instant classic: it had three lead guitars and no bass. Just as the single appeared Radalj left the band (which became Hoodoo Gurus) to form irreverent cow-punk trio The Johnnys, nevertheless he had been a Guru long enough to have co-written with Faulkner several outstanding songs – "Leilani", "(Let's All) Turn On", "Arthur" and "Death Ship" – which appeared on the band's 1984 debut album, Stoneage Romeos. Hoodoo Gurus' iconic status on the Australian rock scene was acknowledged when they were inducted into the 2007 ARIA Hall of Fame.

Once again, Radalj only remained long enough with The Johnnys to appear on one single, "I Think You're Cute". In 1985, Radalj together with James Baker (ex Hoodoo Gurus) released a single, a cover of The Troggs' "I Can't Control Myself" with an original, "Born to Be Punched" on the B-side. The single was credited to The James Baker Experience. In 1986 Radalj teamed up again with Baker (by then ex-Beasts of Bourbon), plus Boris Sujdovic (ex-Rockets, The Scientists, Beasts of Bourbon) and Peter Simpson (ex-Spectre's Revenge) as the Adorable Ones. Within a year the Adorable Ones had renamed themselves the Dubrovniks in honour of the fact that both Radalj and Sujdovic had been born in the historical Croatian city of Dubrovnik. The band's clattering yet accessible rock'n'roll appealed on record in the shape on two 1988 singles for the Citadel label, "Fireball of Love" and "My Coo Ca Choo" and contributed to their album Dubrovnik Blues before Radalj was involved in fisticuffs onstage at the Greek Theatre in Melbourne and he moved on again. His next sideline project, the Punjabbers, issued one single, "Rock'n'Roll Loveletters", on the original Timberyard label in 1988.

=== Roddy Ray'Da ===
With backing from his own band, Roddy Ray'Da & the Surfin' Caesars (including Bill Gibson (ex-Eastern Dark), Gye Bennetts (ex-Tablewaiters) and Jim Leone and Paul Larsen from the Celibate Rifles), Radalj released his debut solo album in 1989. Produced by ex-Radio Birdman and Hitmen member Chris Masuak, Lost Lonely and Vicious [11?] was an immediate success on the Australian independent charts producing the single "Dynamite Party" Chris Masuak enlisted Bob Dutch Sattler for the lead solo guitar for that track, All the single, and album rhythm guitar is from Bill Gibson care of Chris Masuak. As well as producing the single "Dynamite Party" the album included a rip-roarin' cover of the Dictators' "Master Race Rock". The second album, Orgazmatazz, was brimming with dexterous trash rock and a healthy sense of the absurd, as epitomised by tracks such as "Hammer the Motor", "Hellcat's Howl", "Galaxy Girl" and "Evil Woman in a Mini Skirt". Guitarist John Freckleton however replaced Bill Gibson for the "Orgazmatazz" live line up only, and the loyal for 5 years Guitarist Bob Dutch Sattler that Played basically 99% of the Lead, and 50% of all Rhythm guitar on The second album!, Orgazmatazz, with Phil Hall rhythm ace 50%, and slide guitar. As for the "Orgazmatazz" line up, John Freckleton played one frenzied wah wah solo (on the vinyl only version only), and not on any subsequent releases. .

His third album, Mouthful of Chicken, released in 1993, was an conceived extended 1st takes of rhythm, and occasionally inclusive lead solo tracks all in the same take, Bob Dutch Sattler was pressed for intensity that sometimes worked, with Roddy's passionate vocals on the track "Love Lies on the Wings of a Butterfly", an almost stairstep to AOR, "Mouthful of Chicken", Radalj returned to Perth to attend to family matters.

=== Perth return ===
In 2005 he released Guns Girls & Guitars on the Timberyard Records label, the album was put together over a lengthy period, in four different studios, with the aid of fellow musicians Murry Cook, Matt Reddell, Mick Radalj, Simon Goodridge, Reg Zar, Lucy DeSoto, Rose Tattoo's Pete Wells, Chris Welsh, Bob Spencer and others. In late 2006 Radalj formed his latest band, The Smokin' Eldorados, sharing guitar and vocal duties with Matthew de la Hunty (Tall Tales and True), and initially with drummer Reg Zar (The Elks, Bhundu Boys and with Jeff Martin from The Tea Party) and bassist James Rogers (The Fault, Harlequin League). Rogers being replaced with Laurie Sinagra (sound engineer, who has worked with Jebediah, Downsyde, Dom Mariani, Sodastream, Gyroscope and Turnstyle) and Zar with Tim Bates.

Radalj (with de la Hunty and Jeff Strong) supplied new music for Greenhead (2007) a 55-min movie directed/produced by Mark Howett with Sinagra as Sound Producer/Engineer and starring Kelton Pell, de la Hunty and Derek Kreckler.

== Discography ==
Radalj has been a member of the following bands:

- The Exterminators (1977)
- The Invaders (1977–1978)
- The Scientists (1978–1979)
  - "Frantic Romantic"
- The Rockets (1979–1980)
  - "Mean Mistress" / "Little Donna" (April 1980)
- Hoodoo Gurus (1981–1982)
  - "Leilani" (1982)
  - Stoneage Romeos (1984)
- The Johnnys (1982–1984)
  - "I Think You're Cute" / "Mountain Man" (October 1983)
  - "The Way of the West" / "There's Time"(1984)
- Big Choir (1984)
- Love Rodeo (1984–1985)
- The James Baker Experience (1985–1986)
  - "I Can't Control Myself" / "Born To Be Punched" (1985)
- The Adorable Ones (1987)
- The Dubrovniks (1988–1989)
  - "Fireball of Love" / "If I Had a Gun" (April 1988)
  - "My Coo Ca Choo" / "Girls Go Maniac" (November 1988)
  - "Speedway Girls" / "Freezing Rain" (June 1989)
  - Dubrovnik Blues
- The Punjabbers (1988)
  - "Rock'n'Roll Loveletters"
- Roddy Ray'da (1989)
  - Lost, Lonely and Vicious (1989)
  - "Dynamite Party"
- Roddy Ray'da and the Surfin' Caesars (1989–1994)
  - Orgazmatazz (1991)
  - A Mouthful of Chickens (1993)
- Roddy Ray'da (2005)
  - Guns Girls & Guitars (April 2005)
- The Smokin' Eldorados (2006–present)
  - "Songs in the Car Keys of Life"

== See also ==
- Punk rock in Australia
