= James Baker (musician) =

Australian musician (1954–2025)

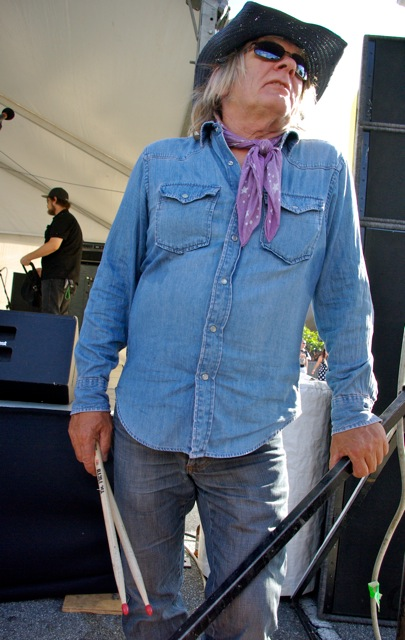
- Baker in 2011

Background information
- Born: James Lawrence Baker; 7 March 1954; Perth, Western Australia, Australia
- Died: 5 May 2025 (aged 71)
- Genres: Rock
- Occupation: Musician; songwriter
- Instrument: Drums
- Years active: 1973–2025
- Label: Red Eye
- Formerly of: The Scientists; Hoodoo Gurus; The Victims; The Dubrovniks; Beasts of Bourbon

James Lawrence Baker (7 March 1954 – 5 May 2025) was an Australian musician, best known as the drummer of various rock and punk rock groups, including the Victims, the Scientists, Hoodoo Gurus, Beasts of Bourbon, and the Dubrovniks. In 2006, Baker was inducted into the West Australian Music Industry Hall of Fame. The following year, Hoodoo Gurus were inducted into the ARIA Hall of Fame.

== Biography ==
=== Early days ===
Baker grew up in Fremantle, Western Australia, with family roots stretching back in the port city for generations. His father played reserves for the East Fremantle Football Club.

In May 2003, Baker told Sylvester Fox of Groove Magazine about his first drumming gig, "I was in a Beatles covers band. I saw Ringo Starr and I said I want to do that." Baker named Ronnie Bond of the Troggs as his main drumming influence. He then drummed for Black Sun (1973–74), which played original material. He followed with the Slick City Boys (1974–75). In 1976, he travelled to the United States and then England, where he saw early live performances by the Ramones, Flamin' Groovies, the Dictators and Johnny Thunders. Baker described a chance encounter:

"I met Sid Vicious on a bus in London in September 76. My first day in London. I had a New York Dolls t-shirt on and he came up and sat next to me and said how much he liked the New York Dolls. I told him I'd just seen Johnny Thunders in New York and he told me Johnny Thunders was apparently thinking of coming to England. Which he did. So he got that one right. He introduced himself as John Richie, which was his name not Sid Vicious." – James Baker

Baker considered auditioning for the Clash:

"I met Joe Strummer and Mick Jones at a pub after a Damned gig. I had a Ramones t-shirt on and they came up to me and talked to me about that. They said they needed a drummer. But I hadn't played for a year so." – James Baker

In 1977, Baker was a member of protopunk band, Beheaded/the Geeks, alongside Ross Buncle on guitar, Rudolph V (aka Dave Cardwell) on bass guitar and Lloyd on vocals. They were one of the first punk rock groups in Perth, although they played no gigs and did not release any recorded material at that time. Baker's "powerful, furious drumming was legendary around Perth." After Dave Faulkner (aka Dave Flick) joined on lead vocals and guitar, the band became known as the Victims. Baker and Faulkner co-wrote their first single, "Television Addict" (1977). It has appeared on several punk compilations; and according to Australian musicologist, Ian McFarlane, it "consolidated their fierce live reputation" and is "one of the first Australian punk singles."

=== The Scientists ===
In May 1978, Baker joined another Perth-based punk rock band, the Invaders, with Kim Salmon on guitar and vocals; Roddy Radalj on guitar and vocals; and Boris Sujdovic on bass guitar. He replaced their original drummer, John Rowlings and they were renamed the Scientists. Sujdovic left in August 1978 and they did not resume performing until January 1979 with Dennis Byrne on bass guitar. The band released its first single in April 1979, "Frantic Romantic", on the DNA label. Radalj and Byrne had left in that month, and were replaced by Ben Juniper on guitar and Ian Sharples on bass guitar. This line-up recorded the band's four-track extended play, The Scientists (released February 1980). McFarlane declared that "Frantic Romantic" and The Scientists EP are some of "the most collectable artefacts of the Australian punk rock era."

The group toured the Australian east coast during December 1979 and again in February–March 1980; they also appeared on ABC-TV's pop music show, Countdown, performing "Last Night" from their EP. Juniper left in May 1980 and Baker, Salmon and Sharples continued as a three-piece. The band broke up in January 1981 after recording their debut self-titled album, The Scientists (commonly referred to as The Pink Album), which was released in August of that year via White Rider/EMI. The Scientists reformed in September, without Baker.

=== Hoodoo Gurus ===
In January 1981, Baker, Faulkner and Radalj joined Kimble Rendall (ex-XL Capris), on guitar and vocals, as founders of Sydney–based band, Le Hoodoo Gurus (later renamed Hoodoo Gurus). This resulted from:

A chance meeting [by Dave Faulkner] with guitarists Kimble Rendall and Roddy Radalj at an end-of-1980 New Year's Eve party led to the formation of Le Hoodoo Gurus, with former Victims drummer James Baker rounding out the roster.

— Fred Mills, Harp Magazine correspondent,

Rendall left in 1982 just prior to the release of their debut single, "Leilani" (October), and was replaced by Clyde Bramley on bass guitar and backing vocals from Sydney bands, The Hitmen and Super K. Radalj was next to leave the band as he was unhappy with Rendall's leaving and Faulkner's greater influence on the band's direction. He was replaced by ex-Fun Things guitarist, Brad Shepherd, who had been Bramley's flatmate and in The Hitmen and Super K.

Gurus new line-up of Baker, Bramley, Faulkner and Shepherd recorded the band's first album, Stoneage Romeos (March 1984), Baker co-wrote two tracks. Baker and Shepherd were also in a side project, Beasts of Bourbon. In August as Hoodoo Gurus were "riding its first wave of success, Baker was sacked amid a blaze of ill-feeling." Shepherd, in turn, was sacked from Beasts of Bourbon. Hoodoo Gurus iconic status on the Australian rock scene was acknowledged when they were inducted into the 2007 ARIA Hall of Fame.

=== Beasts of Bourbon ===
Baker joined the Beasts of Bourbon in September 1983, together with Tex Perkins (ex-the Dum-Dums), Spencer P. Jones (the Johnnys), and former bandmates Salmon and Sujdovic of the Scientists. That group were formed by vocalist Perkins to fulfil bookings, which his previous band could not meet. This line-up was featured on the band's first album, The Axeman's Jazz(July 1984), recorded in a single afternoon in the previous October for $100, by producer, Tony Cohen. McFarlane opined that the album, "remains a classic of Australian garage/swamp rock. It was the best-selling Australian alternative album for 1984. It also went on to sell over 30 000 copies in Europe."

In mid-1984, when the Scientists (with Salmon and Sujdovic aboard) left Australia to tour overseas the Beasts of Bourbon line-up of Baker, Jones and Perkins were joined by Shepherd and Stu Spasm on bass guitar (ex-Zulu Rattle, Salamander Jim) for their national Sultans of Swig tour. After Baker was fired from Hoodoo Gurus and Shepherd was fired from Beasts of Bourbon, Spasm moved to rhythm guitar and Graham Hood (from the Johnnys) joined on bass guitar. Although the album became an underground success (a cover of "Psycho" being a hit on alternative radio), the band went into hiatus after the tour.

Baker provided lead vocals and drums for a single: a cover of the Troggs' track, "I Can't Control Myself" (June 1985), with an original, "Born to Be Punched" as its B-side. It was credited to the James Baker Experience, which comprised Baker, Perkins, Radalj and Spasm, and appeared via Red Eye Records with Mark Callaghan producing.

When both the Johnnys and the Scientists disbanded Beasts of Bourbon reunited in 1987 as Baker, Jones, Perkins, Salmon and Sujdovic. They recorded another album, Sour Mash (December 1988), with Phil Punch as producer and audio engineer. The swamp-rock of The Axeman's Jazz had given way to a fusion of blues-based pub rock and punk with great effect. McFarlane declared that it "virtually redefined the parameters of guitar-based rock'n'roll. The Cramps-influenced swamp-rock of old had been discarded for a more adventurous slab of gutbucket blues and avant-garde weirdness. Perkins' voice had matured into an authentic blues growl that showed the influence of Howlin' Wolf, Captain Beefheart and Tom Waits."

Black Milk (July 1990), their next album expanded on this idea. The band grew confident and powerful while touring Europe on the back of Sour Mash and grew in popularity. Early in 1991 Baker and Sujdovic left to be replaced by Brian Hooper on bass guitar and Tony Pola on drums – both from Salmon's new band, the Surrealists.

=== The Dubrovniks and beyond ===
In 1988, Baker joined another group, the Dubrovniks, alongside Radalj and Sujdovic together with Peter Simpson on guitar and vocals (ex-Teeny Weenies, Super K, Spectre's Revenge, Hoi Polloi). The band's name was used as Radalj and Sujdovic were both born in the Croatian town of Dubrovnik. They released several albums: Dubrovnik Blues (August 1989), Audio Sonic Love Affair (September 1990), Chrome (June 1992) and Medicine Wheel (1994). After they broke up in 1995 Baker returned to Perth.

On 10 February 1995, the 1980s line-up of the Scientists: Baker, Juniper, Salmon and Sharples, reformed for a one-off show in Perth. Baker's later projects included Rockin' Hendy (with Rik van der Velde on guitar, and Lou Boy on bass guitar and vocals) and the Painkillers. Baker formed the Painkillers in May 2005 together with Joe Bludge on guitar and vocals. They played support slots in Perth for the Fuzz, Little Birdy, The Panda Band, Brian Hooper, Pharaohs, and Beasts of Bourbon. On 25 August 2005 the Painkillers released their debut album, Drunk on a Train, on Blazing Strumpet Records, through Reverberation. In 2006 Baker was inducted into the West Australian Music Industry Hall of Fame.

=== Death ===
Baker died from liver cancer on 5 May 2025, at the age of 71.

== Discography ==
=== Singles ===
List of single with selected details
Title	Year
"I Can't Control Myself" / "Born to Be Punched" (as James Baker Experience)	Released: 1985
"Friday Night Friend" / "She Said" (as The James Baker Beat with Dom Mariani)	Released: 2025

== Awards ==
=== West Australian Music Industry Awards ===
The West Australian Music Industry Awards are annual awards celebrating achievements for Western Australian music. They commenced in 1985.

Year	Nominee / work	Award	Result
2006	James Baker	Hall of Fame	inductee

== See also ==
- Punk rock in Australia
