= Brad Shepherd =

Australian musician (born 1961)

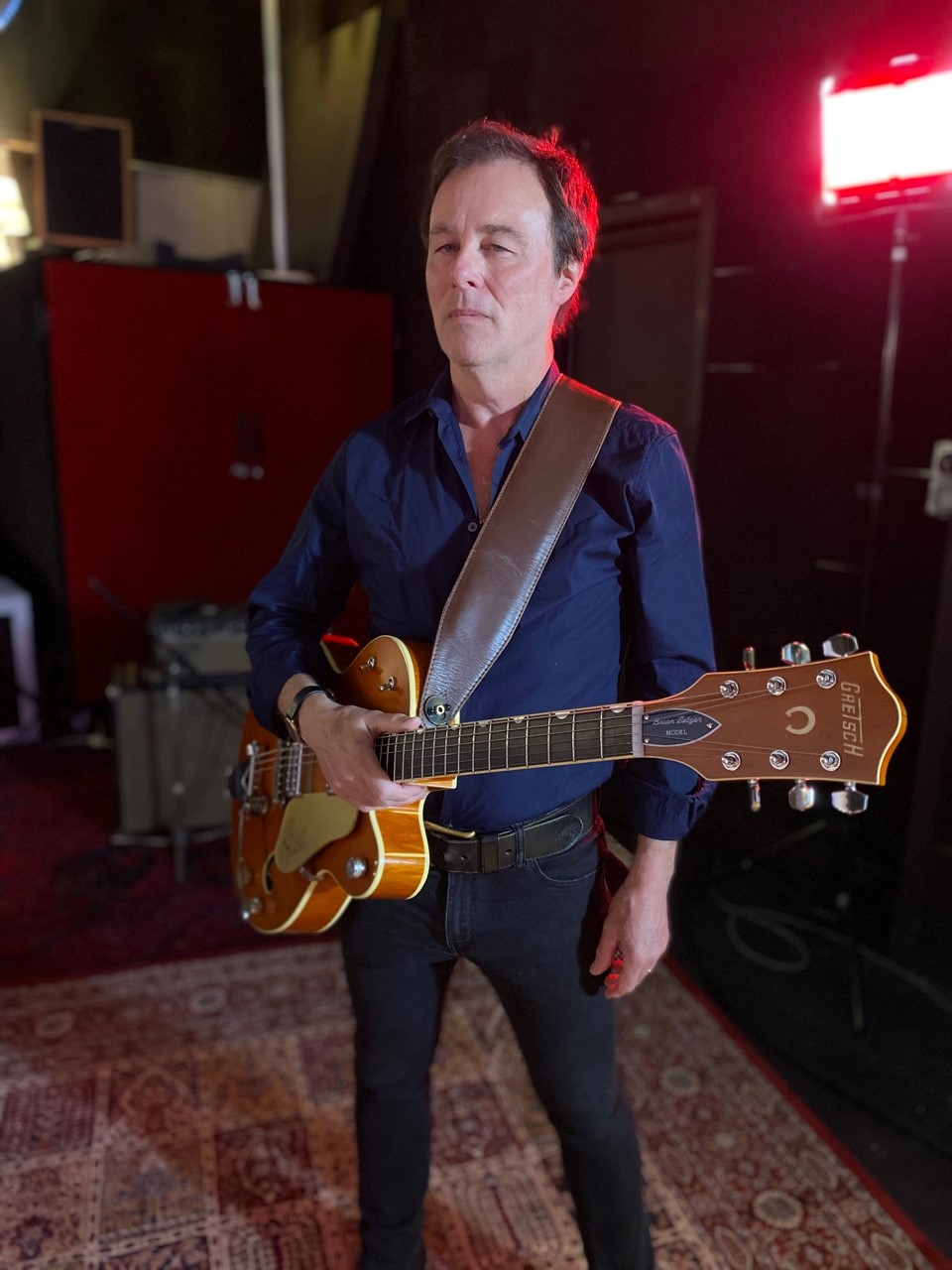

Background information
- Born: Bradley Mark Shepherd; 1 February 1961 (age 65); Sydney, Australia
- Genre: Rock
- Occupations: Musician, singer, songwriter
- Years active: 1978–present
- Labels: A&M, Elektra, RCA, Zoo/Volcano (Mushroom), Evangeline, EMI

Bradley Mark Shepherd (born 1 February 1961) is an Australian rock musician. Shepherd is a guitarist, singer-songwriter and harmonica player; he has performed with several bands, especially Hoodoo Gurus.

== Biography ==
=== Early life ===
Shepherd was born in Sydney but his parents relocated to Brisbane when he was six years old and describes himself as "a frustrated drummer": his parents had bought a drum kit but after moving on to guitar he left the kit for his younger brother Murray Shepherd. Shepherd attended Kedron High School and Brisbane Grammar School in the mid-1970s. His first band was Brisbane punk rock act, The Aliens, which formed in 1978 with Shepherd as their lead guitarist/singer, John Hartley on bass and Murray Shepherd on drums. With the addition of second guitarist, Graeme Beavis, The Aliens eventually became The Fun Things by 1979 and released a self-titled EP, The Fun Things (1980).

In mid 1980 Shepherd joined The 31st, which at that stage consisted of Mick Medew, Tony Robertson, Chris Welsh and Ron Peno (Died Pretty). In September 1980 Peno and Shepherd travelled to Sydney, where Shepherd was invited to join The Hitmen, replacing Tony Vidale. At that time they included Johnny Kannis (lead vocals), Mark Kingsmill (drums, backing vocals), Warwick Gilbert (bass, backing vocals) and Chris Masuak (guitar, backing vocals). Upon joining, Shepherd re-recorded his guitar parts for their debut self-titled album, The Hitmen (1981) in one day, and then toured the east coast of Australia to promote it. The band changed record labels (switching from WEA to RCA Records), with fellow 31st member Tony Robertson replacing Gilbert, and entered studios to record their second album, It is What it is! (1982), with Shepherd also writing the band's 1982 single, "Bwana Devil".

As a side project, Shepherd had joined former Hitmen member and fellow flatmate, Clyde Bramley (bass guitar), in bubble gum pop group Super K to record a single "Go Go" / "Recurring Nightmare" (1982) (co-written by Shepherd). Hassles with The Hitmen producers and Masuak led Shepherd to quit, he followed Bramley into Hoodoo Gurus.

=== Hoodoo Gurus ===
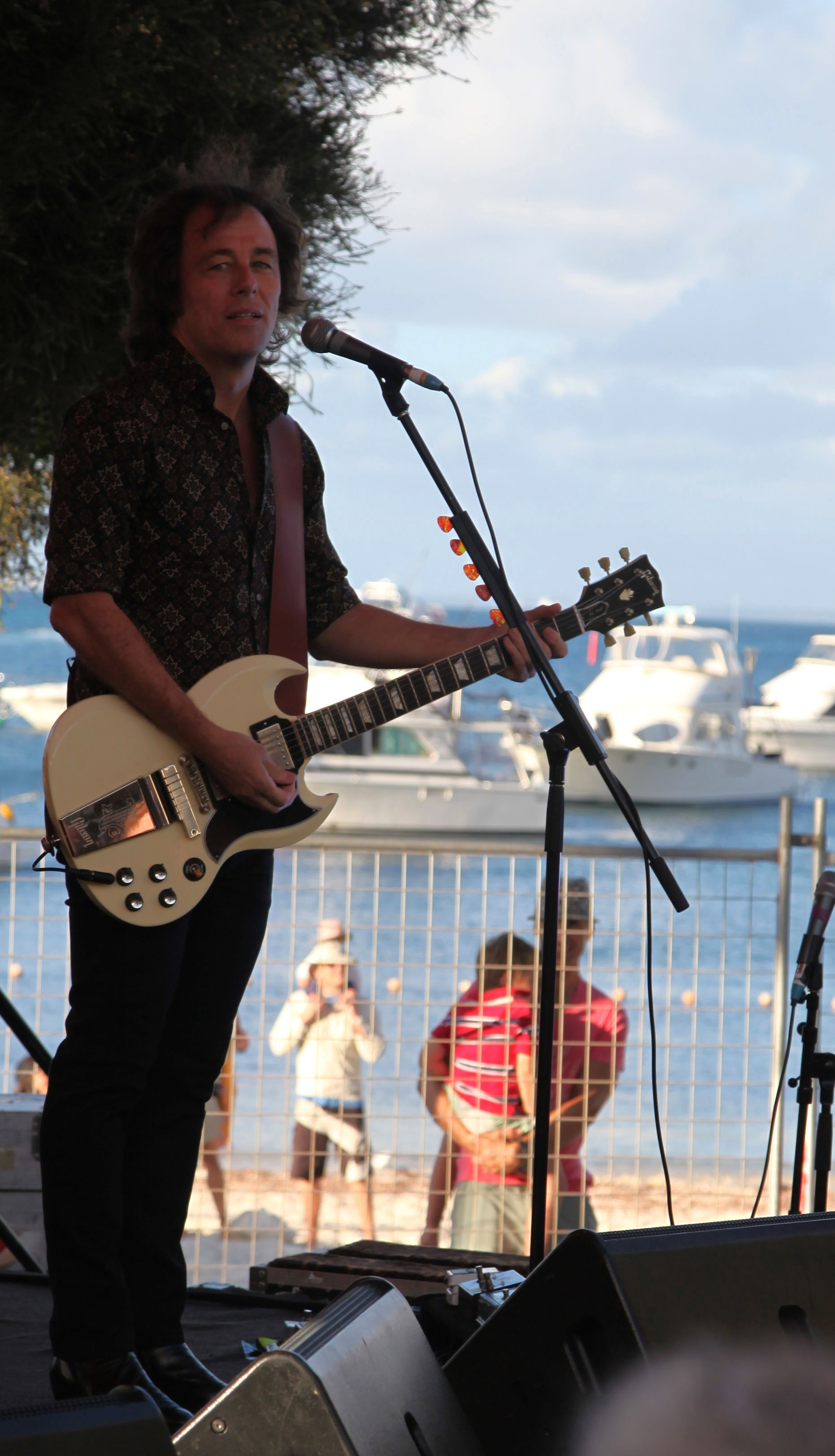
Brad Shepherd April 2012 on stage with the Hoodoo Gurus

In 1981, Faulkner had founded Le Hoodoo Gurus in Sydney with James Baker, Roddy Radalj and Kimble Rendall but after their first single, "Leilani" (1982), Rendall and Radalj both left being replaced by Bramley and Shepherd. As Hoodoo Gurus, with Shepherd on lead guitar, backing vocals (sometimes lead vocals) and harmonica the band released eight studio albums starting with Stoneage Romeos (1984).

Shepherd was briefly involved with James Baker's side project Beasts of Bourbon, and recorded their four-track CD, From the Belly of the Beasts (1984) live at the Trade Union Club, Sydney. Shepherd's tenure with Beasts ended after Baker was sacked from the Gurus in 1984. Baker's replacement was fellow The Hitmen drummer Mark Kingsmill who joined in time for Hoodoo Gurus first US tour starting in late 1984. Bramley left in 1988 to be replaced by Richard Grossman (ex-Divinyls, Matt Finish).

Hoodoo Gurus' best performed single written by Shepherd was "You Open My Eyes" (1994) which reached No. 43 on the ARIA Singles Charts. Hoodoo Gurus line-up was unchanged from 1988 until they disbanded in 1998, they reformed in 2003 with same members: Faulkner, Shepherd, Kingsmill and Grossman.

In 1999, following Gurus break-up, Shepherd recorded "Alex Chilton" for The Replacements tribute album, I'm in Love... With That Song (Antfarm Records). He also produced Shutterspeed's debut EP, Up Go The Shutters (1999) and co-produced their second EP, Well Ain't That Something A Good Thing's Comin' (November 1999) on Laughing Outlaw Records.

=== The Monarchs ===
Shepherd then went on to form a new band, The Monarchs (initially known as The Honkies), together with Andy Kelly on bass (Glide), Greg Hitchcock on guitar (The Neptunes, The Kryptonics, New Christs, The Verys, Challenger 7, You Am I, The Dearhunters) and his brother Murray Shepherd (Harpoon, The Fun Things, Screaming Tribesmen) on drums. The Monarchs played with The Meanies, Even, You Am I, Joe Strummer and The Hellacopters. In August 2000 they released their first single, "2001" b/w "This Is All I Can Do" (Ivy League Records) which was followed by their debut album, Make Yer Own Fun, in October 2001 (Shock Records).

From 1990 onwards, fellow Hoodoo Gurus member Grossman has been involved in a side project, Ghostwriters, with Rob Hirst from Midnight Oil. Shepherd played with Ghostwriters on their albums Ghostwriters (1991) and Fibromoon (1999). The Kelly Gang was a 2004 project Grossman formed with Jack Nolan to record Looking for the Sun (July 2004); Shepherd performed as a session musician.

=== Persian Rugs ===
In September 2001, the four ex-Gurus (Faulkner, Grossman, Kingsmill & Shepherd) performed as The Moops (later called Persian Rugs). At Homebake 2001, both Hoodoo Gurus and Persian Rugs performed separate sets. Just after Persian Rugs recorded a five-track EP Mr. Tripper (June 2002) Grossman left the band, with Shepherd then recommending bassist Kendall James as his replacement (ex Thurston Howlers, Crusaders). With the addition of James the Persian Rugs recorded their debut album Turkish Delight, which was released in August 2003.

=== Hoodoo Gurus reformed ===
Persian Rugs provided the track "Be My Guru" for the Hoodoo Gurus' tribute album Stoneage Cameos (2005) (see Stoneage Romeos) but by that time Hoodoo Gurus had already reformed. They had released their come-back album, Mach Schau (2004), then undertook a national tour followed by an international tour. Hoodoo Gurus iconic status on the Australian rock scene was acknowledged when they were inducted into the 2007 ARIA Hall of Fame.

In August 2009 it was revealed that Shepherd had been battling cancer and was recovering from recent surgery. It was his second brush with the disease, having had a melanoma removed five years ago.

== Discography ==
- The Fun Things (1978–1980)
  - The Fun Things (EP) – Independent (1980) re-release (2000)
- The 31st (1980–1981)

no recorded output known

- The Hitmen (1981–1982)
  - The Hitmen – WEA (1981)
  - "Everybody Knows (I Didn't Like Love)" b/w "Dancin' Time" – RCA (7" single) (1982)
  - "Bwana Devil" b/w "Didn't Wanna Love You" – WEA (7" single) (1982)
  - It Is What It Is! – RCA (1982)
- Super K (1982)
  - "Go Go" b/w "Recurring Nightmare" – Green (7" single) (1982) Citadel Records re-release (1985)
- Hoodoo Gurus (1981–1998) (2003–present)
- Beasts of Bourbon
  - From the Belly of the Beasts – WEA (1984)
- The Monarchs (1998–1999)
  - "2001" b/w "This Is All I Can Do" – Ivy League Records (2000)
  - Make Yer Own Fun – Shock Records (2001)
- Persian Rugs (2001–2004)
  - Mr Tripper – SOS/Shock (EP) (2002)
  - Turkish Delight – Shock (2003)
  - "Be My Guru" (recorded 2004) on Stoneage Cameos (2005) see Stoneage Romeos
