= Big Time Records =

Australian independent record label

- Distributor(s): Wizard Records
- Country of origin: Australia
- Location: Sydney

Big Time Records was an independent record label based in Sydney, Australia. The label was owned by Lance Reynolds and Fred Bestall, who managed Air Supply in their early days, among others. From 1979 until 1981, Big Time was distributed by Wizard Records, who were purchased by EMI (Australia) Ltd. In 1987–88, distribution moved to BMG and releases were branded more often with RCA, BMG and Big Time simultaneously. There were regional branches with offices in London and Los Angeles, publishing as Big Time Records UK Ltd and Big Time Records (America) Inc.

At its peak during the mid-1980s, Big Time had artists such as Love & Rockets, The Dream Syndicate, Love Tractor, The Lucy Show, Redd Kross, Jazz Butcher Conspiracy, Dumptruck, Hoodoo Gurus, Detective Red, The Trilobites, The Turbines and Alex Chilton. They also released the single "Saturday at 3PM" by Darius and the Magnets in 1984.

In 2018, the Hoodoo Gurus resurrected the Big Time label for their vinyl reissue campaign and their comeback album Chariot of the Gods.

== Subsidiaries and labels ==
This list is probably incomplete, and some of the dates are uncertain.

- Big Time Records (America) Inc.
- Big Time Records (UK) LTD
