= Dave Faulkner (musician) =

Australian rock musician

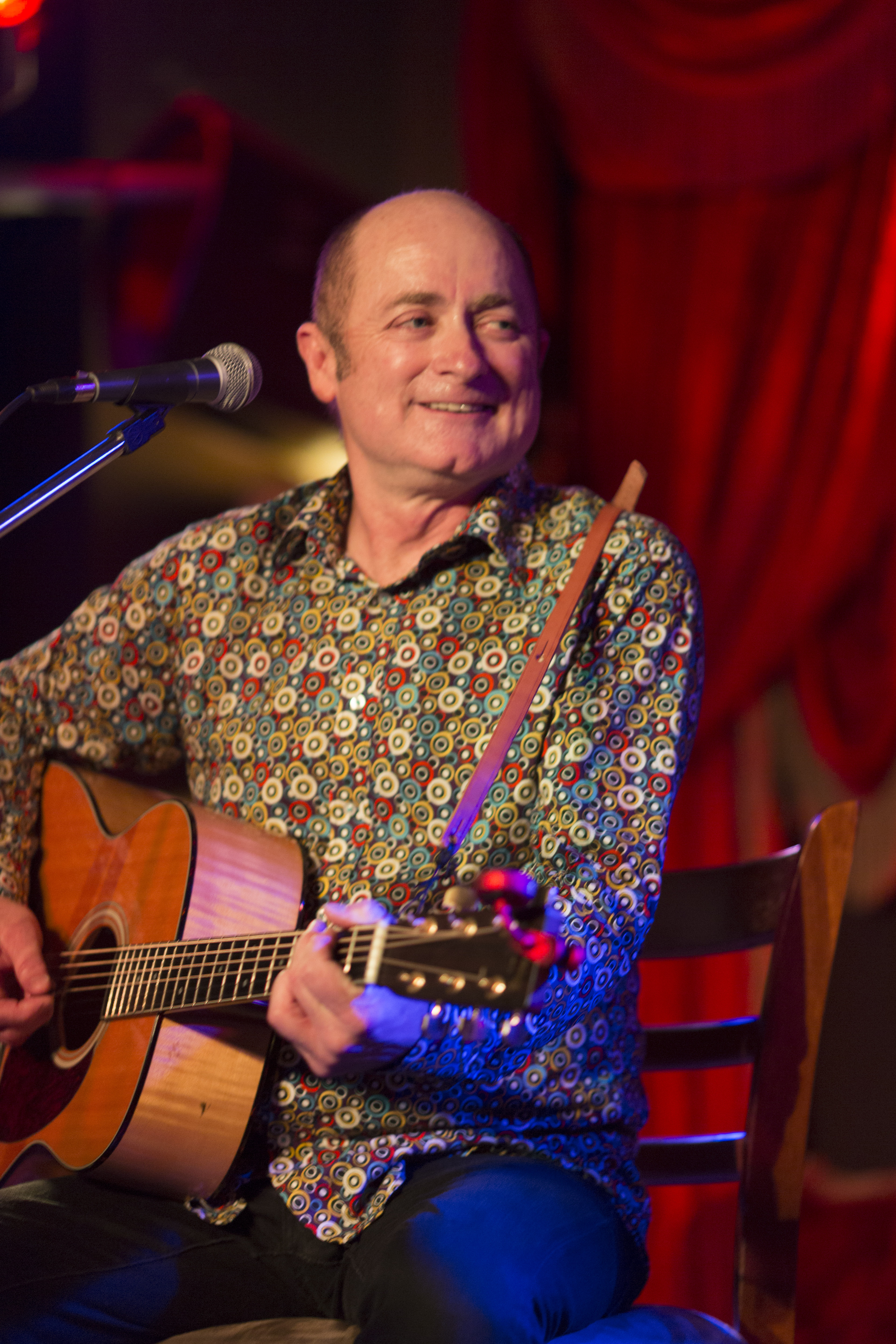
- Faulkner performing in February 2015

Background information
- Also known as: Dave Flick
- Born: David Jonathan Faulkner; 2 October 1957 (age 69); Perth, Western Australia, Australia
- Genre: Rock
- Occupations: Musician, singer, songwriter
- Years active: 1977–present
- Labels: A&M, Elektra, RCA, Zoo/Volcano (Mushroom), Evageline, EMI

David Jonathan Faulkner (born 2 October 1957) is an Australian rock musician who also performed as Dave Flick. Faulkner is a singer-songwriter, guitarist and keyboardist; he has performed with several bands, but is best known as a member of Hoodoo Gurus. He wrote the band's best known single, 1987 hit "What's My Scene?", which reached No. 3 on the National charts.

As the mainstay member of Hoodoo Gurus, Faulkner gave the acceptance speech when they were inducted into the Australian Recording Industry Association Hall of Fame on 18 July 2007 at the Plaza Ballroom, Melbourne. Faulkner was one of the new entries in the 2007 edition of Who's Who in Australia.

== Early life and career ==
Faulkner's father, Martin Faulkner was a World War II veteran who served in the Royal Australian Navy (RAN) and survived the sinking of HMAS Canberra I during the Battle of Savo Island. Faulkner's mother Ruth was a tireless community worker and local politician, serving as a councillor for the City of Belmont, a local government district of Perth in which the Faulkner family lived. In 1968, she was the first woman elected to the Shire of Belmont and served as Deputy Shire President. She was instrumental in creation of the City of Belmont's public library, which is named for her, as is the park in which the council offices are located. Faulkner was educated at Perth's Trinity College.

Faulkner, aka Dave Flick, along with James Baker and Dave Cardwell (aka Rudolph V) were founding members of punk band The Victims in 1977. Baker and Faulkner co-wrote the band's first single "Television Addict", which is regarded as one of Australia's great punk rock songs and has featured on several punk compilations.

After The Victims split in 1979, Faulkner played keyboards with another Perth band The Manikins, who also performed some of his songs.

== Hoodoo Gurus ==
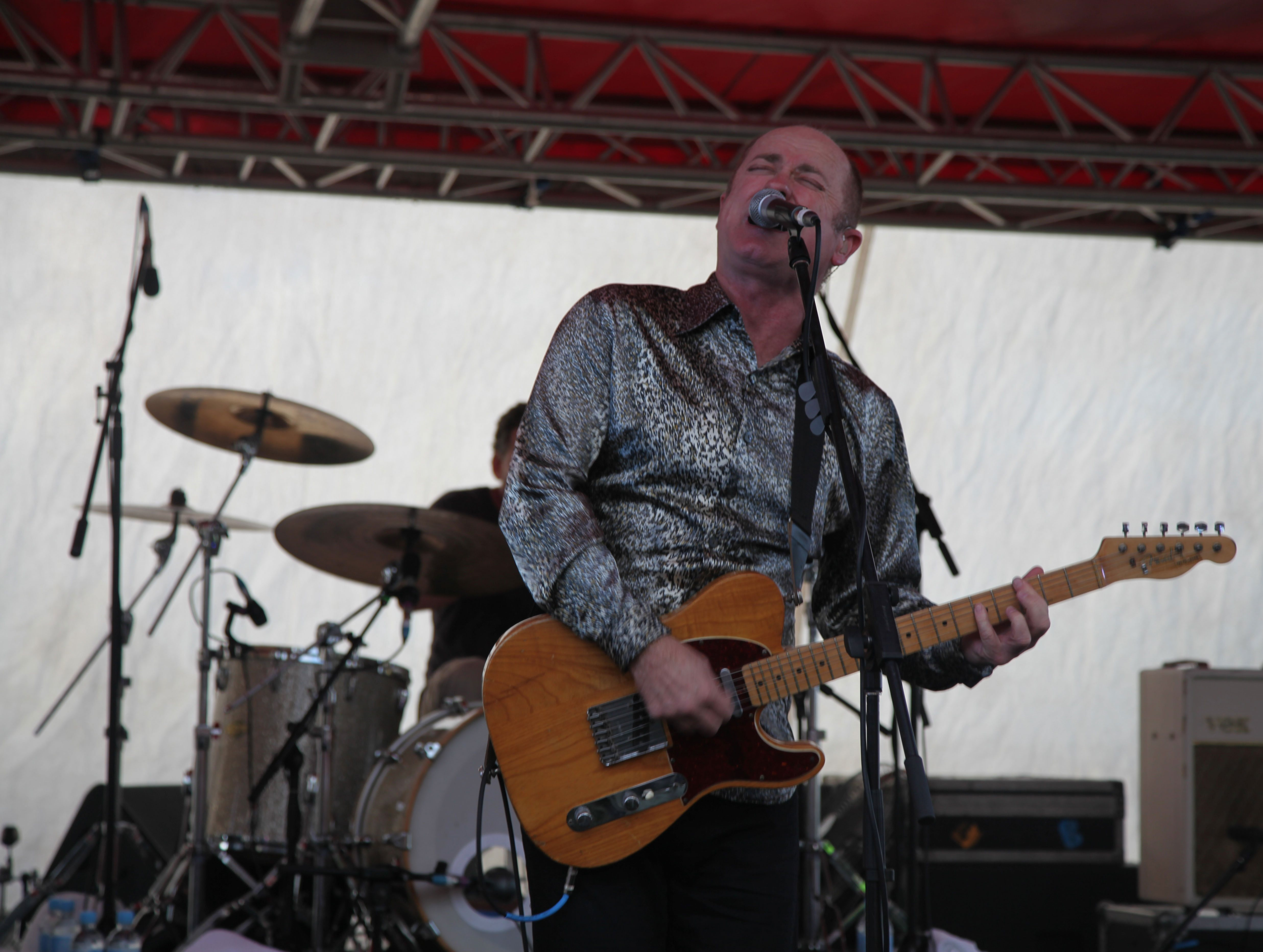
Dave Faulkner Apr 2012 at Rottnest in front of the Hoodoo Gurus

In 1981, Baker and Faulkner founded Le Hoodoo Gurus in Sydney with Roddy Radalj and Kimble Rendall: their first single was "Leilani" (1982). As Hoodoo Gurus, the band enjoyed success in many countries without having a major international hit. They released eight original albums and several compilations, and officially split in 1998, but reformed in 2003.

Faulkner also wrote original music for films Broken Highway (1993) and The Sum of Us (1994). His song for Hoodoo Gurus "Come Anytime" (June 1989) is the theme song to the Australian television show Thank God You're Here (2006). The Gurus reworked their hit, "What's My Scene?" as "That's My Team" also by Faulkner, the 2003–2007 promotional theme for the National Rugby League (NRL). Faulkner is a well-known, long-time supporter of NRL team the Cronulla Sharks and appeared in one of their jerseys for the "That's My Team" promotional video. Faulkner had also written "1000 Miles Away" (1991) which was adopted as the 'anthem' for RAN frigate HMAS Canberra II, Hoodoo Gurus played a concert including "1000 Miles Away" on-board (in front of both Canberra I and II veterans including Faulkner's father) during their last voyage out of Fremantle to Fleet Base West, prior to its decommissioning in 2005.

In September 2001, Faulkner, together with fellow Hoodoo Gurus members Rick Grossman, Mark Kingsmill and Brad Shepherd, performed as The Moops (later called Persian Rugs). At Homebake 2001, (8 December) both Hoodoo Gurus and Persian Rugs performed separate sets. Just after Persian Rugs recorded a five-track EP Mr. Tripper (June 2002) Grossman left the band, with Shepherd then recommending bassist Kendall James as his replacement (ex Thurston Howlers, Crusaders). With the addition of James, Persian Rugs recorded their debut album Turkish Delight, which was released in August 2003.

Persian Rugs provided the track "Be My Guru" for the Hoodoo Gurus' tribute album Stoneage Cameos (2005) (see Stoneage Romeos) but by that time Hoodoo Gurus, with Grossman on bass, had already reformed and released Mach Schau (2004).

As the mainstay member of Hoodoo Gurus, Faulkner gave the acceptance speech when they were inducted into the Australian Recording Industry Association Hall of Fame on 18 July 2007 at the Plaza Ballroom, Melbourne. Faulkner was one of the new entries in the 2007 edition of Who's Who in Australia.

On 6 May 2009, Faulkner was inducted into the Western Australian Music Industry (WAM) Hall of Fame.

== Antenna ==
In 1998, following Hoodoo Gurus' split, Faulkner formed a new band Antenna, collaborating with long-time friend Kim Salmon (The Cheap Nasties, The Manikins, The Scientists, Beasts of Bourbon); Justin Frew and Stuart McCarthy (both of Southend) were the band's other members. Antenna recorded an album (between April and August 1998), and then made their live debut at the Telstra Concert of the Century/Mushroom 25th anniversary in November 1998. The concert coincided with the release of the band's debut single "Come on Spring" and album Installation. Guest performers on the album included Matt Thomas (The Mavis's) on "All Rise", and Christina Amphlett (Divinyls), on "Divine". "Come on Spring" reached No. 64 on the 1998 Triple J Hottest 100 list. Antenna appeared on the 1999 Big Day Out tour but disbanded soon after.

== Other activities ==
A National Office for Live Music was launched by Australian Prime Minister Kevin Rudd in July 2013 and, as of August 2013, Faulkner is the state co-ambassador for New South Wales, alongside Stavros Yiannoukas from Bluejuice.

Faulkner is the music critic for the national newspaper The Saturday Paper.

Faulkner is a fan of the Cronulla-Sutherland Sharks in the National Rugby League, and the Fremantle Dockers in the Australian Football League.

== Discography ==
Dave Faulkner was part of the following bands;

- The Victims (1977–1978)
- Midget and the Farrellys
- The Manikins
- Hoodoo Gurus (1981–1998; 2003–present)
- The Fleshtones
- Antenna (1998–1999)
- Persian Rugs (formerly known as The Moops) (2001–2003)

== Awards ==
=== Australian Songwriters Hall of Fame ===
The Australian Songwriters Hall of Fame was established in 2004 to honour the lifetime achievements of some of Australia's greatest songwriters.

Year	Nominee / work	Award	Result
2023	Himself	Australian Songwriters Hall of Fame	inducted

=== West Australian Music Industry Awards ===
The West Australian Music Industry Awards are annual awards celebrating achievements for Western Australian music. They commenced in 1985.

Year	Nominee / work	Award	Result
2009	Dave Faulkner	Hall of Fame	inductee
