= Boom Crash Opera discography =

Australian rock band discography

- Boom Crash Opera performing in Rockhampton, Queensland, in August 2026
- Studio albums: 6
- EPs: 2
- Live albums: 1
- Compilation albums: 6
- Singles: 21
- Box sets: 1

Boom Crash Opera are an Australian rock band formed in 1985. The band have released six studio albums, six compilation albums, two EP, one box set and twenty-one singles.

In March 2025, the band released their first new single in 28 Years "Latest Hustle".

== Albums ==
=== Studio albums ===
Title	Details	Peak chart positions	Certifications (sales thresholds)
Title	Details	AUS	Certifications (sales thresholds)
Boom Crash Opera	Released: September 1987; Label: WEA (254927.1); Producer:	19	ARIA: Gold
These Here Are Crazy Times!	Released: October 1989; Label: WEA (256895.1)	10	ARIA: 2× Platinum
Fabulous Beast	Released: March 1993; Label: EastWest (450992015-2)	15	
Born	Released: February 1995; Label: BMG (76896401962)	37	
Gizmo Mantra	Released: November 1997; Label: BMG (74321512592)	—	
Dancing in the Storm	Released: 1 May 2009; CD+DVD; Label: Liberation (BLUE1642)	—	
"—" denotes releases that did not chart or were not released in that country.

=== Live albums ===
Title	Details
Live at The Tivoli Sydney 1986	Released: 4 October 2024; digital; Label: ACRA

=== Compilation albums ===
Title	Details	Peak chart positions
Title	Details	AUS
Look! Listen!!	Released: 1990; Label: WEA (903173031-2)	47
The Best Things – Greatest Hits	Released: August 1998; Label: Gotham/Sony BMG (74321607922)	—
The Essential Boom Crash Opera	Released: April 2007; Label: Sony BMG (88697069602)	—
The Best Things – Greatest Hits	Released: 18 October 2013; Label: Liberation	—
The Lost Things	Released: 18 October 2013; Label: Liberation	—
Whole Shebang: Anthology	Released: 31 January 2017; Label: Liberation	—

=== Box set ===
Title	Details
Rattle It Out	4-CD set (featuring their first four studio albums); Released: 18 October 2013; Label: Liberation (LM4CD002)

== Extended plays ==
Title	Details	Peak chart positions
Title	Details	AUS
Dreams on Fire	Released: 10 November 1991; Label: East West, Warner (903175894-2)	44
Kick it Out... Live	Released: 18 February 2022; Label: Boom Crash Opera	—

== Singles ==
List of singles, with selected chart positions
Year	Title	Peak chart positions		Album
Year	Title	AUS	US Mod	Album
1986	"Great Wall"	5	—	Boom Crash Opera
1986	"Hands Up in the Air"	16	—	Boom Crash Opera
1987	"City Flat"	42	—	Boom Crash Opera
1987	"Her Charity"	32	—	Boom Crash Opera
1988	"Love Me to Death"	72	—	Boom Crash Opera
1989	"Onion Skin"	11	8	These Here Are Crazy Times
1989	"Get Out of the House!"	24	—	These Here Are Crazy Times
1989	"The Best Thing"	67	—	These Here Are Crazy Times
1990	"Dancing in the Storm"	21	—	These Here Are Crazy Times
1990	"Talk About It"	35	—	These Here Are Crazy Times
1991	"The Best Thing (Listen! mix)"	112	—	Look! Listen!!
1992	"Bettadaze"	43	—	Fabulous Beast
1993	"In the Morning"	36	—	Fabulous Beast
1993	"This Isn't Love"	78	—	Fabulous Beast
1994	"Gimme"	14	—	Born
1995	"Tongue Tied"	25	—	Born
1995	"Dissemble"	113	—	Born
1995	"Soundtrack (So Lonely)"	148	—	—N/a
1997	"Dreaming up a Fire"	178	—	Gizmo Mantra
1997	"All"	—	—	Gizmo Mantra
2025	"Latest Hustle"	—	—	
— denotes releases that failed to chart.
