= The Essential Boom Crash Opera =

Compilation album by Boom Crash Opera
- Released: April 2007
- Recorded: Platinum Studios, RAK Studios, Metropolis Audio, Track Record, Hot Tin Roof, Kiva West, Hothouse Audio, Gotham Audio, The Bunghole
- Genre: Rock
- Length: 74:46
- Label: Sony BMG
- Producer: Keith Forsey, Pete Smith, Peter Farnan, Richard Pleasance, Rick Will, Don Gehman, Steve Brown, Alex Sadkin

Boom Crash Opera chronology
The Best Things – Greatest Hits (1998)	The Essential Boom Crash Opera (2007)	Dancing in the Storm (2009)

The Essential Boom Crash Opera is the third compilation album by Australian rock band Boom Crash Opera, released in April 2007.

== Reception ==
Professional ratings
Review scores
Source	Rating
AllMusic	3/5 stars

Marisa Brown from AllMusic gave the album 3 out of 5, saying; "Most of the material on The Essential is culled from their 1987 self-titled debut and 1989s These Here Are Crazy Times, and includes nearly all the singles from both of these records. Tracked chronologically, the compilation shows the progression of the band's sound well, as it was shaped both by the passage of time and the departure of main songwriter and guitarist Richard Pleasance. Said sound, unfortunately, becomes a lot more derivative and less interesting as the years pass, the college rock energy and grit that initially attracted fans not as well represented in songs like "All," "Bettadaze," and "Gimme." As The Essential is slightly more in-depth than the 1998 'best-of' The Best Things, though some of the later tracks are different, it doesn't add much interest for a fan of the band, but it does—and is intended to—act as a primer on a group that was often overlooked outside of Australia, and in that it succeeds."

== Track listing ==
1. "Great Wall" (Dale Ryder, Richard Pleasance) - 3:46
2. "Hands Up in the Air" (Peter Farnan, Richard Pleasance) - 3:55
3. "City Flat" (Peter Farnan, Richard Pleasance) - 4:09
4. "Her Charity" (Peter Farnan, Richard Pleasance) - 5:00
5. "Love Me to Death" (Richard Pleasance, Peter Farnan) - 4:28
6. "Onion Skin" (Peter Farnan) - 3:28
7. "Get Out of the House!" (Greg O'Connor, Dale Ryder, Peter Farnan; Peter Maslen, Richard Pleasance) - 3:19
8. "The Best Thing" (Richard Pleasance) - 4:14
9. "Dancing in the Storm" (Richard Pleasance, Peter Farnan) - 4:12
10. "Mountain of Strength" (Dale Ryder, Peter Maslen, Richard Pleasance; Greg O'Connor; Peter Farnan) - 4:09
11. "Talk About It" (Richard Pleasance) - 4:03
12. "End Up Where I Started" (Peter Farnan; Richard Pleasance) - 3:13
13. "Holy Water" (Greg O'Connor, Peter Maslen, Richard Pleasance, Dale Ryder, Peter Farnan) - 3:56
14. "Bettadaze" (Peter Farnan, Greg O'Connor, Dale Ryder) - 3:59
15. "In the Morning" (Peter Farnan, Greg O'Connor) - 3:57
16. "This Isn't Love" (Dale Ryder) - 3:30
17. "Gimme" (Ian Tilley, Peter Farnan) - 3:36
18. "Dreaming Up a Fire" (Richard Pleasance, Peter Farnan) - 3:44
19. "All" (Peter Maslen, Peter Farnan, Ian Tilley) - 4:12
