= The Best Things (2013 album) =

The Best Things – Greatest Hits

Greatest hits album by Boom Crash Opera
- Released: 18 October 2013
- Recorded: 1986–2012
- Genre: Rock; pop rock; pop; alternative rock
- Label: Liberation Records

Boom Crash Opera chronology
Dancing in the Storm (2009)	The Best Things – Greatest Hits (2013)	The Lost Things (2013)

The Best Things – The Greatest Hits is the fourth compilation album and third greatest hits released by Australian rock band Boom Crash Opera. The album was released in Australian on 18 October 2013. The album was launched on 25 October 2013 at the Flyer Saucer Club in Melbourne. The album includes tracks from the group's first four studio albums as well as two new tracks recorded in 2012, "I am" and "You Can't Stop the Sun".

In an interview with between Weekend Notes and band member Peter Maslen, he described the album as "... a basic CD. It's got the hits and two new songs we recorded last year, which surprised us, but we did do two songs last year. It wasn't planned."

The group toured the album from February to May 2014.

== Track listing ==
1. "Onion Skin" (Peter Farnan) – 3:29
2. "The Best Thing" (Richard Pleasance) – 4:14
3. "Great Wall" (Dale Ryder, Richard Pleasance) – 3:46
4. "Hands Up in the Air" (Peter Farnan, Richard Pleasance) – 3:56
5. "Dancing in the Storm" (Richard Pleasance, Peter Farnan) – 4:11
6. "City Flat" (Peter Farnan, Richard Pleasance) – 4:10
7. "Bettadaze" (Peter Farnan, Greg O'Connor, Dale Ryder) – 3:57
8. "In the Morning" (Peter Farnan, Greg O'Connor) – 3:54
9. "Talk About It" (Richard Pleasance) – 4:41
10. "Gimme" (Ian Tilley, Peter Farnan) – 3:36
11. "This Isn't Love" (Dale Ryder) – 3:29
12. "Get Out of the House!" (Greg O'Connor, Dale Ryder, Peter Farnan, Peter Maslen, Richard Pleasance) – 3:20
13. "Her Charity" (Peter Farnan, Richard Pleasance) – 4:59
14. "I Am" (Peter Farnan) – 4:05
15. "You Can't Stop the Sun" (Peter Farnan, Greg O'Connor) – 3:41

== Release history ==
Region	Date	Format	Label	Catalogue
Australia	18 October 2013	CD, Digital download	Liberation Records	LMCD0229
