= The Best Things (1998 album) =

The Best Things – Greatest Hits

Greatest hits album by Boom Crash Opera
- Released: August 1998
- Recorded: 1986–1997
- Genre: Rock; pop rock; pop; alternative rock
- Length: 69:16
- Label: BMG

Boom Crash Opera chronology
Gizmo Mantra (1997)	The Best Things – Greatest Hits (1998)	The Essential Boom Crash Opera (2007)

Professional ratings
Review scores
Source	Rating
AllMusic	3/5 stars

The Best Things – The Greatest Hits is the first greatest hits released by Australian rock band Boom Crash Opera. The album was released in August 1998 and includes tracks from all of Boom Crash Opera's five studio albums as well as non-album single "Soundtrack" and unreleased track "Radio".

== Track listing ==
1. "Great Wall" (Dale Ryder, Richard Pleasance) – 3:47
2. "Hands Up in the Air" (Peter Farnan, Richard Pleasance) – 3:57
3. "City Flat" (Peter Farnan, Richard Pleasance) – 4:1
4. "Her Charity" (Peter Farnan, Richard Pleasance) – 5:02
5. "Onion Skin" (Peter Farnan) – 3:30
6. "Get Out of the House!" (Greg O'Connor, Dale Ryder, Peter Farnan; Peter Maslen, Richard Pleasance) – 3:21
7. "The Best Thing" (Richard Pleasance) – 4:15
8. "Dancing in the Storm" (Richard Pleasance, Peter Farnan) – 4:15
9. "Bettadaze" (Peter Farnan, Greg O'Connor, Dale Ryder) – 3:59
10. "In the Morning" (Peter Farnan, Greg O'Connor) – 3:59
11. "This Isn't Love" (Dale Ryder) – 3:33
12. "Gimme" (Ian Tilley, Peter Farnan) – 3:37
13. "Soundtrack" (Peter Farnan) – 4:48
14. "Radio" (Dale Ryder) – 3:45
15. "All" (Peter Farnan, Peter Maslen, Ian Tilley) – 4:15
16. "Welcome to Tomorrow" (Peter Farnan) – 8:58
