= Dancing in the Storm (album) =

Studio album by Boom Crash Opera
- Released: 1 May 2009 (Australia); 5 May 2009 (United Kingdom)
- Recorded: February 2009, Victoria
- Genre: Rock, pop rock, pop, acoustic
- Length: 48:16
- Label: Liberation Records
- Producer: Richard Pleasance

Boom Crash Opera chronology
The Essential Boom Crash Opera (2007)	Dancing in the Storm (2009)	The Best Things (2013)

Dancing in the Storm is the sixth studio album by Australian rock band Boom Crash Opera. The album was released in Australia on 1 May 2009 as part of the Liberation Music "Blue Acoustic" series. The physical version came with a bonus live DVD, recorded in June 1993.

The group said they recorded "the songs that came easy, without too much thinking or mucking around" and toured the album nationally throughout May and June 2009.

The album was released in the United Kingdom on 5 May 2009 and was the group first UK release since 1987s self-titled debut.

The album was re-released in 2012 under the title Greatest Hits Acoustic.

== Reception ==
Paul Cashmere from Undercover FM gave the album 2 out of 5 saying; "The thing about Boom Crash Opera is that they had a hellova lotta hits. When you play Dancing on the Storm, you will be amazed how many songs you know." adding "The Boom Crash Opera of the 80s and 90s were loud. Trimming back the sound for Dancing in the Storm brings a whole new dimension to the songs. The mandolin in "Hands Up in the Air" is a complete contrast to the original electric studio version. That is very much the appeal of this album. Boom Crash Opera have not chosen to create carbon copies of the old songs, instead, choosing to reinvent them. However, it is the lesser known Boom Crash Opera tracks that really bring the brilliance of this band to the surface. The haunting piano driven "Talk About You" is mesmerising. "Caught Between Two Towns" highlights Dale Ryder’s vocals and the bands harmonies. It's tasty stuff."

Kelvin Hayes from Daily Info said; ""Hands Up in the Air" has an almost saloon bar of the wild west appeal, "Love Me to Death" smoulders with slow burning bass pulse and a striking re-interpretation of "Talk About It" is imbued by a sombre piano and eerie electronic shimmer that slouches towards Nancy or Frank Sinatra terrain and is perfectly executed by a band that is wonderfully rejoined by co-founder Richard Pleasance; whose mandolin playing really is the sonic equivalent of an old friend giving you a hug at the station. Welcome back!"

Gigs n Interviews said; "Dancing in the Storm is a greatest hits album that the band recorded at original band member (now producer) Richard Pleasance's country property on Victoria's Black Saturday. The album has thirteen tracks and it captured the fun and the carefree feel the band's songs always had." adding "What a great acoustic album this is!"

== Track listing ==
CD

1. "The Best Thing" – 4:10
2. "Onion Skin" – 3:39
3. "Great Wall" – 3:49
4. "Dancing in the Storm" – 4:02
5. "Hands Up in the Air" – 4:22
6. "Love Me to Death" – 3:19
7. "Get Out of the House!" – 3:22
8. "In the Morning" – 3:15
9. "You Wouldn't Want to Know" – 3:49
10. "Bettadaze" – 3:32
11. "Ordinary Heaven" – 3:05
12. "Talk About It" – 4:20
13. "Caught Between Two Towns" – 3:38

DVD (Recorded June 1993 in Network Nine studios, Melbourne)

1. "Get Out of the House" – 3:31
2. "Talk About It" – 3:34
3. "This Isn't Love" – 3:55
4. "The Last Place on Earth" – 4:56
5. "What a Goodnight" – 4:19
6. "Don't Let On" – 5:06
7. "In the Morning" – 3:51
8. "Bettadaze" – 3:18
9. "Dancing in the Storm" – 5:30
10. "Onion Skin" – 3:37

== Credits ==
- Ian Tilley – bass
- Dale Ryder – vocals
- Pete Farnan – guitar
- Peter Maslen – drums
- Greg O’Connor – piano and mandolin
- Richard Pleasance – bass, guitar, mandolin, sitar and Oud.

== Release history ==
Region	Date	Format	Label	Catalogue
Australia	1 May 2009	CD + DVD, Digital download	Liberation Records	BLUE1642
United Kingdom	5 May 2009	Digital download	101 DISTRIBUTION	B01KASTTAI
