= Look! Listen!! =

Look Listen!

Remix album by Boom Crash Opera
- Released: 1990
- Studio: Ariola Records
- Genre: Rock
- Length: 50:02
- Label: WEA
- Producer: Boom Crash Opera

Boom Crash Opera chronology
| These Here Are Crazy Times (1989) | Look Listen! (1990) | Dreams on Fire (1991) |

Look Listen! is the first remix album by Australian rock group Boom Crash Opera, released in 1990. Look Listen! peaked at number 47 on the ARIA Charts.

== Track listing ==
Look! Listen!
| No. | Title | Writer(s) | Length |
|---|---|---|---|
| 1. | "Onion Skin" (Extended Mix) | Peter Farnan | 5:06 |
| 2. | "Great Wall" (Extended Mix) | Dale Ryder, Greg O'Connor, Richard Pleasance | 4:59 |
| 3. | "Off To Sea" | Peter Farnan, Greg O'Connor | 4:19 |
| 4. | "The Best Thing" (Listen! Mix) | Richard Pleasance | 7:28 |
| 5. | "Hands Up in the Air" (Extended Mix) | Peter Farnan, Richard Pleasance | 4:47 |
| 6. | "Get Out of the House!" (Extended Mix) | Dale Ryder, Greg O'Connor, Peter Farnan, Peter Maslen, Richard Pleasance | 5:41 |
| 7. | "Bombshell" (Extended Mix) | Peter Farnan, Richard Pleasance | 6:04 |
| 8. | "Rocks Are In My Head" | Dale Ryder, Peter Maslen | 3:55 |
| 9. | "Talk About It" | Richard Pleasance | 4:03 |
| 10. | "These Here Are Crazy Times" | Dale Ryder, Greg O'Connor, Peter Farnan, Peter Maslen, Richard Pleasance | 4:09 |
| Total length: | | | 50:02 |

== Personnel ==
- Bass – Peter Farnan, Richard Pleasance
- Drums – Peter Maslen
- Guitar – Greg O'Connor, Peter Farnan, Richard Pleasance
- Keyboards – Greg O'Connor
- Vocals – Dale Ryder, Peter Farnan, Peter Maslen, Richard Pleasance
- Written-By – Peter Farnan (tracks: 1, 3, 5, 7, 8), Richard Pleasance (tracks: 2 to 5, 7, 8, 9)
