= Dancing in the Storm =

Dancing in the Storm may refer to:

- "Dancing in the Storm" (song), 1990 song by Australian band Boom Crash Opera
  - Dancing in the Storm (album), 2009 album by Boom Crash Opera
- Dancing in the Storm (TV series), 2018 Chinese TV series
