= The Best Things =

The Best Things may refer to:

- The Best Things (1998 album), a compilation album by Boom Crash Opera
- The Best Things (2013 album), a compilation album by Boom Crash Opera
- "The Best Things", a song by Filter from the album Title of Record
- "Best Things", a song by Rodney Atkins from the album It's America

== See also ==
- The Best Thing (disambiguation)
