= Horsehead (band) =

Australian rock band

- Origin: Melbourne, Victoria, Australia
- Genres: Hard rock
- Years active: 1991–2000, 2020
- Labels: ATI/Mushroom/Festival, Stubble/Shock/Golden Robot Records
- Past members: Scott Kingman; Cameron McKenzie; Andy McLean; Mick Vallance; Craig Waugh

Horsehead are an Australian hard rock band which formed in late 1991 with Scott Kingman on guitar (ex-Cattletruck), Cameron McKenzie on guitar, Andy McLean on vocals (both ex-21 Guns), Mick Vallance on bass guitar (Serious Young Insects, Boom Crash Opera) and Craig Waugh on drums (Uncanny X-Men). They toured nationally and internationally as well as supporting United States group, Metallica, on the Australian leg of their April 1998 tour. The band issued three albums, Horsehead (1993), Onism (1996) and Goodbye Mothership (1999) before disbanding in 2000. According to Australian rock music historian, Ian McFarlane, their style of "stadium rock mixed a Led Zeppelinesque bottom-end kick with gut-thumping Faith No More-styled riffs. Nothing subtle or innovative, but everything delivered with great force and conviction".

== History ==
In late 1991 Horsehead formed in Melbourne with Scott Jonathon Kingman on guitar (ex-Cattletruck), Cameron McKenzie on guitar, Andrew Donald McLean on vocals (both ex-21 Guns), Michael James Vallance on bass guitar (Serious Young Insects, Boom Crash Opera) and Craig Douglas Waugh on drums (Uncanny X-Men). The band members' previous groups were "pop rock outfits" while the new group were "a harder edged venture". Their music was "strong and energetic metal-edged heavy rock, drawn from a love of the classic rock tradition, then injected with subtle melody and blended with a sublime commercial sensibility". In February 1992 they performed their first gig, at the Station Tavern in Prahran. By June that year they recorded a six track demo which was sent to record companies. The demo caught the attention of Madonna's label Maverick Records, label executives were impressed with the sound but wanted to make some changes to their image. In New York they showcased for other labels and, upon their return to Australia, gained attention from major local record companies. In October they entered the studio to record more tracks, including their debut single, "Oil and Water".

In June that year Horsehead signed with Mushroom Records, flew to Memphis, United States where Mike Fraser produced their debut self-titled album. They released "Oil and Water", which received regular air play on radio station, Triple M, while the related music video won the Kerrang! award for best rock video. In October they supported Hoodoo Gurus on an east coast tour. The album appeared that month on ATI Productions, Mushroom Records and Festival Records. According to Australian rock music historian, Ian McFarlane, their style of "stadium rock mixed a Led Zeppelinesque bottom-end kick with gut-thumping Faith No More-styled riffs. Nothing subtle or innovative, but everything delivered with great force and conviction". In February the following year their second single, "Liar", was issued. They commenced a tour backing Baby Animals. In March "Liar" was broadcast on MTV's Take 40 Australia. The band completed the tour at Sydney's Eastern Creek Motorcycle Grand Prix, which included The Screaming Jets on the bill. In April they toured with that band. Their third single, "Sun", followed in August, two months later they supported Midnight Oil. However at the end of that year Horsehead stopped touring after McLean was hospitalised with an injured neck from "over-enthusiastic stage activities".

In April 1995 Horsehead performed at the Alternative Nation Festival which featured Faith No More, Nine Inch Nails, Live and Tool. Tool's manager recommended that group's producer, Sylvia Massy (also Skunk Anansie), and in September Horsehead were in Los Angeles to record their second album, Onism, at Sound City Studios with Massy. While in the US, the group played a few gigs in Hollywood. In March the next year they released "Strange" as the first single from the album, its video has footage shot while in the US. The following month the album was launched with a live-to-air rooftop gig at Melbourne 3RRR radio station. McFarlane note that Onism "reflected the band's move into territory already mapped out by US heavyweights like Tool, Stone Temple Pilots and Alice in Chains". Horsehead toured backing Canadian group, The Tea Party. In June a second single, "Ever", was released; while the next month they toured with The Angels. In August "Ever" was remixed by Angelique Cooper and re-released as a dance mix on CD and vinyl. The next month they toured with The Divinyls. In November "Shine" was released as their third single, its music video has footage of US surfer, Kelly Slater, in action. "Shine" was also used on the soundtrack to Slater's own surf video. In December Horsehead and Mushroom Records parted amicably.

In March 1997 Horsehead signed with a new label, Stubble Records / Shock Records and recorded six tracks with Australian producer Tony Cohen (Nick Cave, The Cruel Sea), which appeared as an extended play, Crinkles aka Golden Cow Collection in June. In April they issued their first single, "Capital H", on Stubble Records to coincide with their support of US band, Live, on a local tour of Australian and New Zealand in May. Horsehead appeared on Australian Broadcasting Corporation TV's Recovery program performing two tracks, "Crinkles" and "Golden Cow", off the EP. They started their own Australian east coast tour. In August a second single, "Second Time Around", was released. They performed the single on a TV show, Plukka's Place – a spin-off of Hey Hey It's Saturday – hosted by Livinia Nixon and Daniel Kowalski. In September they supported Alice Cooper in Melbourne and Sydney on his Australian tour. In November they joined with The Angels and The Screaming Jets for the Barbed Wire Ball Tour of Australia.

In March 1998 the band began work on their third album, Goodbye Mothership, which took a year to complete. It was mixed by Michael Letho. In April they supported Metallica on the Poor Re-Touring Me Tour for ten dates around the country. The album's first single, "Century", was issued to coincide with that tour; McKenzie considered it to be the highlight of his group's career. In July the band performed their 400th gig, at the Esplanade Hotel, they regularly played at the venue on New Year's Eve throughout the 1990s. In March the following year their second single, "She Fell To Earth", was released and they performed it on Hey Hey It's Saturday. In June the album appeared, McFarlane felt "[i]t revealed a band of great tenacity, with a maturer take on the brash stadium rock of earlier years". On national radio station, Triple J, the band played eight tracks live-to-air on Live at the Wireless. In August following touring they released a third single, "Ramones", with its music video. In June 2000 their fourth and final single, "Bounce Back" / "Procrastinator", was issued and in November the band's website announced they had recorded a cover version of "Antisocial" by French group, Trust.

== Break up ==
Shortly after Horsehead released "Bounce Back" / "Procrastinator" in June 2000, Vallance quit the band, stating that he was "disillusioned with the music business and most of the people connected with it". The band considered continuing with a replacement but broke up shortly after Vallance's exit and each member turned to various projects. Kingman joined Christine Anu's backing band; while McKenzie worked as a session musician and producer for Things of Stone and Wood and Mark Seymour. McLean undertook an Architecture course. Vallance went to work at the ABC. Waugh kept drumming for a variety of local groups. As of April 2005 Vallance confirmed there "won't be a 'reunion' anytime soon as far as [he's] concerned".

== 2019: Reformation ==
In early 2018 the band partnered with Golden Robot Records to create a Legacy box set of all their albums and unreleased material which was released in November 2019 on digital and physical Vinyl albums ( via Golden Robot Records store) many for the first time. The band announced they would reform for a one-off gig to celebrate the Legacy Boxset. Their first official gig in nearly 20 years took place on 1 February 2020 at the Corner Hotel in Richmond Victoria to a full house of adoring fans.

== Members ==
- Scott Jonathon Kingman – guitar (1991–2000)
- Cameron McKenzie – guitar (1991–2000)
- Andrew Donald McLean – vocals (1991–2000)
- Michael James Vallance – bass guitar (1991–2000)
- Craig Douglas "Max" Waugh – drums (1991–2000)

== Discography ==
=== Albums ===
List of albums, with selected chart positions
| Title | Album details | Peak chart positions |
| Title | Album details | AUS |
|---|---|---|
| Horsehead | Released: October 1993; Label: ATI Productions/Mushroom (D24027) | 118 |
| Onism | Released: March 1996; Label: Mushroom (D31540) | 156 |
| Goodbye Mothership | Released: June 1999; Label: Stubble Records (Stub010) | — |

=== Extended plays ===
List of EPs, with selected details
| Title | Details |
|---|---|
| Crinkles aka Golden Cow Collection | Released: June 1997; Label: Stubble Records (Stub003) |

=== Charting singles ===
List of singles that peaked within the top 200, with selected chart positions
| Title | Year | Chart positions | Album |
| Title | Year | AUS | Album |
|---|---|---|---|
| "Liar" | 1994 | 192 | Horsehead |
| "Sun" | 1994 | 128 | Horsehead |
| "She Fell to Earth" | 1999 | 164 | Goodbye Mothership |
| "Ramones" | 1999 | 200 | Goodbye Mothership |
