= Gizmo Mantra =

Studio album by Boom Crash Opera
- Released: November 1997
- Genres: Pop rock, alternative rock
- Labels: Gotham Records, BMG

Boom Crash Opera chronology
Born (1995)	Gizmo Mantra (1997)	The Best Things (1998)

Singles from Gizmo Mantra
- 1. "Dreaming Up a Fire" Released: June 1997; 2. "All" Released: October 1997

Gizmo Mantra is the fifth studio album released by Australian rock group Boom Crash Opera. The album was released in November 1997.

== Reception ==
Professional ratings
Review scores
Source	Rating
AllMusic	2.5/5 stars

Kelvin Hayes from All Music said; "It takes a while to warm up to, and it is a patchy thing even then, but Gizmo is possibly their best work since These Here Are Crazy Times in 1989. Peter Farnan is up to his usual oddball but inventive best on "Don't Forget to Breathe" and the excellent "Welcome to Tomorrow." Former writing partner Richard Pleasance helps out on "Dreaming up a Fire' (a re-take of the earlier hit "Dancing in the Storm"). The driving rock of "(So How Do I Turn You) On" is a brilliant endgame but for Farnan's musical acrobatics on the tail piece. The set is ruined by carelessness such as the '70s dirge "All". Plenty of Gizmo, little sign of a mantra."

== Track listing ==
1. "Wake Up Fine" – 4:09
2. "Dirt" – 3:27
3. "Don't Forget to Breathe" – 4:12
4. "Welcome to Tomorrow" – 3:41
5. "All" – 4:14
6. "Walking Disaster" – 4:07
7. "Funny" – 3:23
8. "Bad Television" – 3:27
9. "Ain't I Amazed" – 4:33
10. "I'm Not Like You" – 3:51
11. "Dreaming Up a Fire" – 3:46
12. "(So How Do I Turn You) On" – 5:31

== Personnel ==
- Dale Ryder — lead vocals
- Peter Farnan — guitars, backing vocals, keyboards
- Ian Tilley — bass, backing vocals, keyboards
- Peter Maslen — drums, backing vocals, percussion
