= The Best Thing =

The Best Thing may refer to:

- "The Best Thing" (Adam Rickitt song), 2000
- "The Best Thing" (Boom Crash Opera song), 1989
- "The Best Thing" (Ivy song), 1997
- "The Best Thing" (Relient K song), 2007
- "The Best Thing" (Savage Garden song), 2001
- "The Best Thing", a song by Carly Simon from Carly Simon, 1971
- "Best Thing", a song by Styx, 1972
- "Best Thing", a song by Usher from Here I Stand, 2008

== See also ==
- The Best Things (disambiguation)
