= Seven Stories (band) =

Australian rock group

- Also known as: Tall Stories
- Origin: Adelaide, South Australia, Australia
- Genre: Rock
- Years active: 1986–1994
- Label: Sony/Columbia
- Past members: Jeff Algra; Michael Boundy; Glyn Lehmann; Sue Oliver; Andrew Tanner; David Carr

Seven Stories was an Australian rock group formed in Adelaide, initially as Tall Stories, in 1986. They were signed to Sony (then CBS Records) and released two studio albums, Judges and Bagmen (1990) and Everything You Want (Nothing That You Need) (1993). At the ARIA Music Awards in 1991 they were nominated for Breakthrough Artist – Single for "Sleeping Through Another War" (1990). The group disbanded in 1994.

== History ==
Seven Stories future members Michael Boundy, Sue Oliver and Andrew Tanner were involved in the Adelaide music scene from the late 1970s. They were sessions musicians at the Good God recording studio, which was run by Rod Boucher and Chris Adams. In 1978 Tanner contributed drums and vocals to Good God recordings, later moving to guitar in the band, the Retreads, which released a self-titled album, in 1980. Boundy played bass guitar for the bands, Thumbs Up and then the Retreads (with Tanner) before joining Perfect Strangers in 1980. In 1984 Tanner composed a track, "Dreams and Visions", which became a banner song for the Uniting Church's National Christian Youth Convention in Adelaide in 1985. "Dreams and Visions" is about Pentecost and is still used by Australian congregations.

Boundy on bass guitar, Oliver on percussion and backing vocals and Tanner on guitar and lead vocals joined up with Jeff Algra on drums, percussion and backing vocals, Glyn Lehmann on keyboards, accordion, French horn and backing vocals to form a rock group, Tall Stories, in Adelaide, in 1986. Their first major recording was a self-produced, self-distributed 12" mini LP Sleeping Through Another War, released in 1987. Oliver left during that year.

Gaining commercial airplay, a major breakthrough came with the signing of the band by Sony (then CBS Records) to a five-year deal. Around 1989 the band changed its name to Seven Stories, to avoid confusion with a United States band, Tall Stories. The deal with Sony led to the critically acclaimed Judges and Bagmen album in 1990. All ten tracks were written by Tanner and it was recorded between October and December of the previous year with Kevin Moloney producing at Platinum Studios, Melbourne. Rolling Stone's reviewer, in January 1991 stated, "it is the music which makes Judges and Bagmen such a compelling album" Additional musicians on the recording are Vika and Linda Bull and Broderick Smith.

At the ARIA Music Awards of 1991 Seven Stories were nominated for Breakthrough Artist – Single for "Sleeping Through Another War". "Sleeping through Another War" and "Walk through Babylon" were released by CBS as singles off the album. The band toured extensively throughout Australia supporting artists such as Midnight Oil, INXS, The Black Sorrows, Hothouse Flowers, Hunters and Collectors and Paul Kelly.

High-profile producers T-Bone Burnett and Boom Crash Opera's Richard Pleasance were engaged by Sony for Seven Stories' second album, Everything You Want (Nothing That You Need) (1993), which provided two singles, "Is that It?" and ". Although he contributed to the album, Lehmann had officially left the band by the time of its release, leaving Algra, Boundy and Tanner as the remaining core. The band toured Europe and North America to support the album. Guitarist David Carr, engaged to augment the band for this recording, relates the band's sudden abandonment by Sony: "We toured that album very successfully, recorded a JJJ Live at the Wireless and had a string of singles before the whole of Sony was instructed to 'drop everything' and divert all energy to making Mariah Carey number one." Seven Stories subsequently disbanded in 1994.

Andrew Tanner worked in Melbourne as a writer and is a member of the psychedelic-styled band The Sand Pebbles and the Woodland Hunters. Boundy, Algra and Lehmann all returned to Adelaide and remained active musically. Drummer Algra played and recorded with a large number of artists including, T-Bone Burnett, The Waifs, The Borderers (with Glyn Lehmann), Jeanette Wormald, Jim Hermel, Andrew Clermont, Liam Gurner, and Jet O'Rourke.

Lehmann has had a musical career as composer, songwriter, arranger, performer and music producer. He has created original music, songs and soundtracks for Australian Broadcasting Corporation television and radio, and the feature-length documentary I Told You I Was Ill – The Life and Legacy of Spike Milligan. He has also worked with the State Theatre Company of South Australia and the Adelaide Symphony Orchestra.

Boundy has played with Adelaide bands Verandah, Vivid, The Borrowed Ones, and played with Lehmann in the band, Sun Theory.

Seven Stories reformed for a one-off performance in Adelaide in April 2012.

== Members ==
- Andrew Tanner – guitar, vocals, keyboards
- Glyn Lehmann – keyboards, backing vocals
- Michael Boundy – bass guitar
- Jeff Algra – drums, percussion, backing vocals
- Sue Oliver – percussion, vocals (1986–1987)

== Discography ==
=== Studio albums ===
List of studio albums, with selected details and chart positions
Title	Album details	Peak chart positions
Title	Album details	AUS
Judges and Bagmen	Released: July 1990; Label: Columbia (466747 2); Format: CD, LP	76
Everything You Want (Nothing That You Need)	Released: August 1993; Label: Columbia (473582 2); Format: CD, cassette	99

=== Singles ===
List of singles
Title	Year	Peak positions	Album
Title	Year	AUS	Album
"Sleeping Through Another War"	1990	68	Judges and Bagmen
"Kicking Against the Bricks"	1990	122	Judges and Bagmen
"Is That It?"	1993	115	Everything You Want (Nothing That You Need)
"Prince of Hollywood"	1993	111	Everything You Want (Nothing That You Need)

== Awards and nominations ==
=== ARIA Music Awards ===
The ARIA Music Awards is an annual awards ceremony held by the Australian Recording Industry Association. They commenced in 1987.

Year	Nominee / work	Award	Result	Ref.
1991	"Sleeping Through Another War"	Breakthrough Artist - Single	Nominated	
