= Tall Stories =

Tall Stories may refer to:

- Tall Stories (band), an American rock band, and their self-titled album
- Tall Stories (album), a 1991 album by Johnny Hates Jazz

== See also ==
- Seven Stories (band), an Australian rock group, initially called Tall Stories
- Tall Story, a 1960 American sports comedy film
