= Onion skin =

Onion skin may refer to:

- Onionskin, thin typewriter paper
- "Onion Skin" (song), a single by Australian band Boom Crash Opera
- Onion skinning, animation technique
- Onion Skin (film)
