= Born (Boom Crash Opera album) =

Studio album by Boom Crash Opera
- Released: February 1995
- Genres: Pop rock, alternative rock
- Labels: Ariola Records, BMG
- Producers: Peter Farnan, Neil Wiles

Boom Crash Opera chronology
Fabulous Beast (1993)	Born (1995)	Gizmo Mantra (1997)

Singles from Born
- 1. "Gimme" Released: September 1994; 2. "Tongue Tied" Released: January 1995; 3. "Dissemble" Released: March 1995

Born is the fourth studio album released by Australian rock group Boom Crash Opera. The album was released in February 1995 and peaked at number 37 on the ARIA Charts.

== Reception ==
Professional ratings
Review scores
Source	Rating
AllMusic	1.5/5 stars

Australian music journalist Ian McFarlane declared the album as a "tougher affair which found the band embracing hi-tech pop, techno-metal and all manner of sound effects and cyberpunk studio trickery".

Kelvin Hayes from All Music said; "With Richard Pleasance gone, the job of creative director fell to BCO's other figurehead, Peter Farnan. While Farnan is a highly resourceful writer, his scrappy production skills take the band into more experimental waters. The intro cliché of the crying baby is naff as the vapid synth sound, yet "Essence" is still engaging. "When She Gets There" is classic Boom Crash Opera, a rousing rocker with a tight bassline from Tilso and Dale Ryder firing on all cylinders. From then on its a downer. Born nods toward Icehouse in its multimedia ethic and, as sure as the glam rock stomp of "Baby You're So Strange" was a career revival for Iva Davies in 1986, so too was "Gimme" for BCO in 1995. Not so much that it could rescue its parent album though. "

== Track listing ==
1. "Essence" – 4:28
2. "When She Gets There" – 4:11
3. "Move Over" – 3:32
4. "Wired" – 3:35
5. "Dissemble" – 4:11
6. "Get Me Happy" – 3:28
7. "Oh So Cool" – 5:14
8. "Gimme" – 3:52
9. "Tongue Tied" – 2:56
10. "Crush" – 3:49

== Personnel ==
- Dale Ryder — lead vocals
- Peter Farnan — guitars, backing vocals
- Ian Tilley — bass, backing vocals
- Peter Maslen —lead vocals

== Charts ==
Chart (1995)	Peak position
Australian Albums (ARIA)	37
