= Adam Rickitt =

English actor and singer (born 1978)

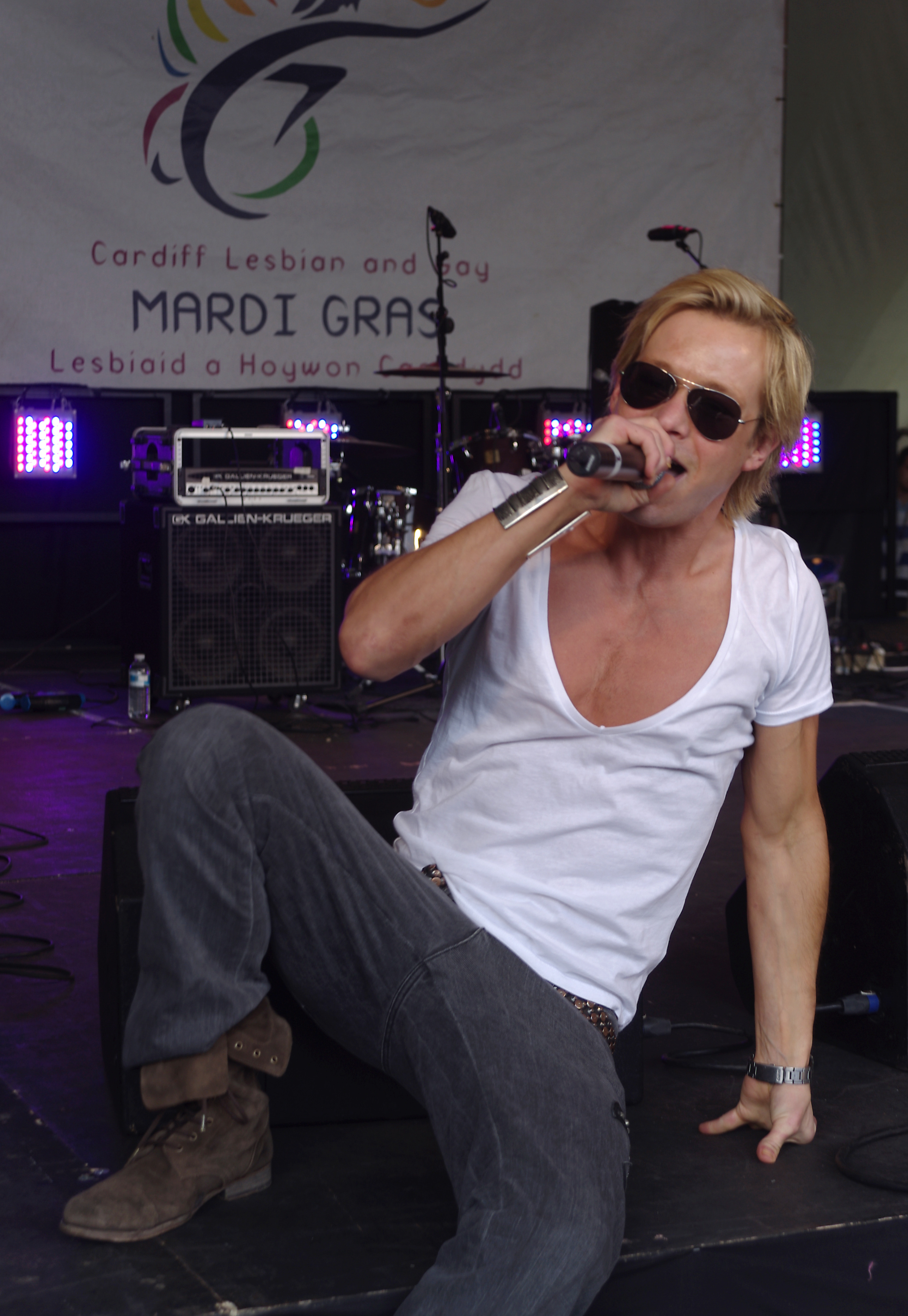
- Rickitt in 2010
- Born: Adam Peter Rickitt; 29 May 1978 (age 48); Crewe, Cheshire, England
- Occupations: Actor; singer; model
- Years active: 1997–present
- Known for: Coronation Street; Shortland Street; Hollyoaks
- Spouse: Katy Fawcett (m. 2014)

Adam Peter Rickitt (born 29 May 1978) is an English actor and singer. He portrayed the part of Nick Tilsley on the British soap opera Coronation Street from 1997 to 1999, and again from 2002 to 2004. He later joined the New Zealand soap Shortland Street for a three-year stint between 2007 and 2010. From 2017 to 2020, he appeared as Kyle Kelly on Channel 4's Hollyoaks. His other credits include the BBC's Doctors (2001; 2016; 2023).

Rickitt had a musical career, both as a solo artist and as a member of 5th Story, a supergroup formed for the ITV reality series The Big Reunion. Alone, he released Good Times (1999) through Polydor Records, an album that spawned the UK Top 25 singles "I Breathe Again", "Everything My Heart Desires", and "The Best Thing". He attempted to embark on a political career within the Conservative Party in 2005, but has since denounced the party's views.

== Early life ==
Adam Peter Rickitt was born on 29 May 1978 in Crewe, the youngest of four brothers who grew up in Cuddington, Eddisbury. His father was the co-owner of an estate agency. Rickitt was educated at Sedbergh School, a boarding school in Cumbria. Rickitt has spoken publicly about suffering from bulimia in his teenage years and about how male sufferers have largely been neglected.

== Career ==
=== 1997–2004: Coronation Street and music career ===
Prior to his acting career, Rickitt was briefly a child model. He subsequently modelled for magazines including Attitude and Cosmopolitan. Rickitt auditioned for the ITV soap opera Coronation Street in 1997. He did it as a joke, having never watched an episode, and his agent said that he would not get it. However, he was cast in the role of Nick Tilsley and remained on the soap until 1999, returning briefly in 2002 and for a longer spell from 2003 to 2004. His most famous and controversial storyline was in 2003, when his character was involved in the series' first gay kiss with Todd Grimshaw (Bruno Langley).

Rickitt left Coronation Street for a while in 1999 to start a music career. He signed a six-album deal with Polydor Records, although he only released one album – Good Times (1999). Rickitt's first single, "I Breathe Again", reached number five in the UK and was certified silver by BPI. The album peaked at number 41 on the UK Albums Chart. Rickitt was then dropped.

Rickitt starred as Mark Cohen in the 2001 UK tour of Rent, before moving to London's West End. He made a return to the London stage to star in Bill Kenwright's production of Office Games, followed by a new play, Final Judgement, and also appeared in Nick Moran's play Telstar on UK tour in 2005.

=== 2005–2010: Political ventures and Shortland Street ===
In October 2005, Rickitt was approved as a prospective parliamentary candidate for the Conservative Party. He was asked into politics as a way of getting young people engaged in voting and admitted that he had no real intentions of progressing far. In February 2006, he appeared on the political debate show Question Time as the non-partisan guest. In May 2006, he was one of 100 would-be MPs chosen for the Conservative party A-list. The following month, he appeared on Sunday AM with Andrew Marr. He attended national and local Conservative party functions in the hope of being selected as a candidate.

Alongside David Cameron, he also provoked the anger of Sir Nicholas Winterton when it was revealed that Rickitt was being tipped to stand for the safe Conservative seat of Macclesfield, which the outraged Winterton had represented for over thirty years. Winterton responded that he had no intention of standing down from this seat: "I wish Adam luck, but there are no vacancies here." Rickitt was unsuccessful in progressing his political career. According to his website, in July 2007, he decided to continue his acting career in New Zealand rather than seek selection as a candidate.

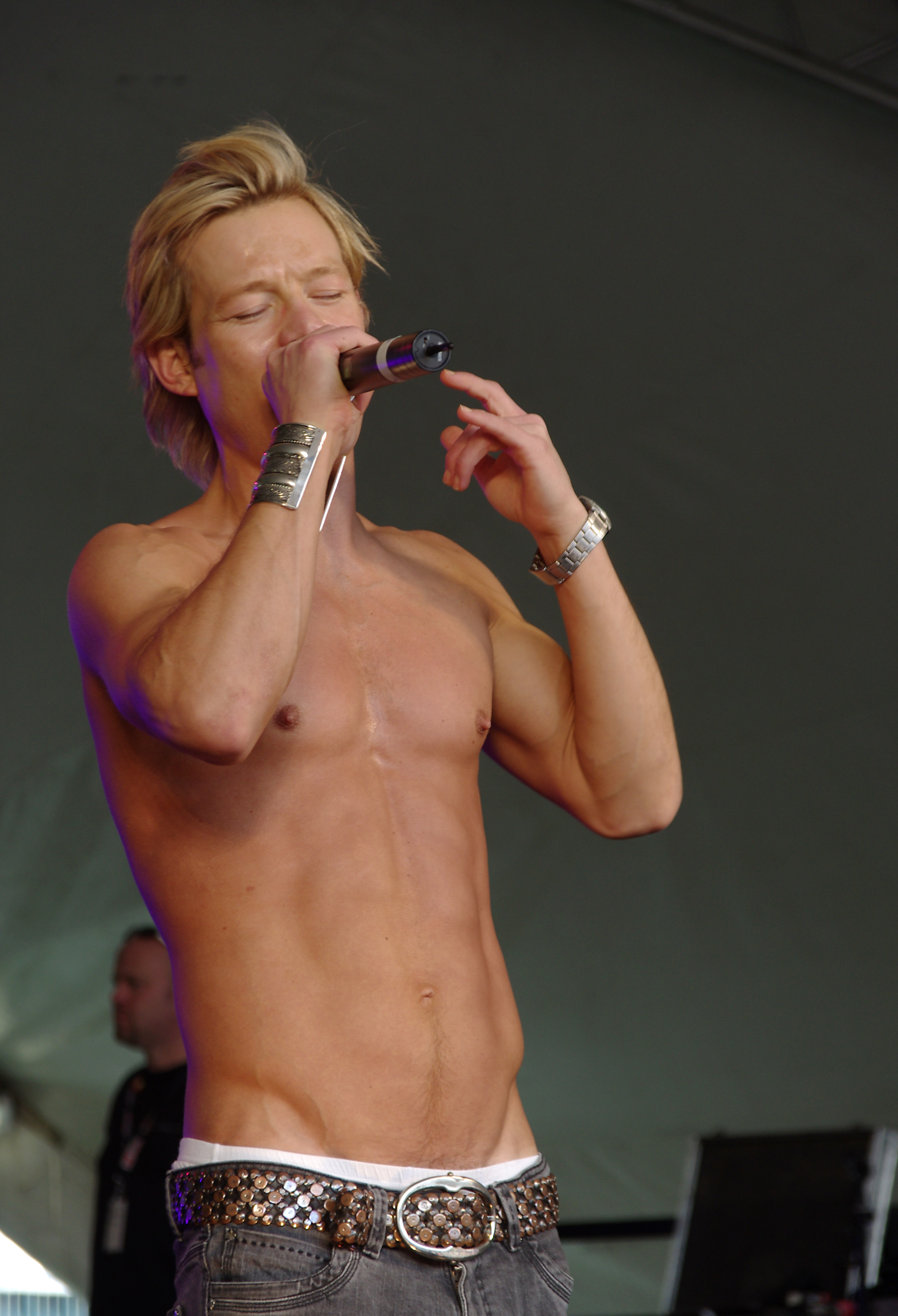
Rickitt performing in 2010

In March 2006, he took part in the Channel 4 reality series The Games. He took part as a replacement, after the scheduled contestant, Goldie, had to pull out, following an accident. Rickitt himself sustained two black eyes after over-rotating off the diving board. In December 2006, Rickitt appeared in his first pantomime, Cinderella, in the role of Prince Charming at the Norwich Theatre Royal.

Rickitt joined the cast of the New Zealand soap opera Shortland Street in early 2007, portraying the role of Kieran Mitchell, with his first appearance being shown on 16 March 2007. Rickitt was given the opportunity to have creative freedom with the character since his storylines had not been fully formed. The character was written out of the series in 2010, with Rickitt's final episode broadcast on 2 August 2010. His death episode saw high ratings for the soap. He had said that he preferred his role on Shortland Street to working on Coronation Street.

He returned to the political scene in October 2010 as a guest reporter for the ITV breakfast television programme Daybreak covering the Conservative Party Conference from Birmingham, and hosted a conference gay party. However, in 2014, Rickitt agreed with a comment that the world would be a better place without the Conservative Party.

=== 2014–present: Doctors and Hollyoaks ===
In 2014, he became part of the supergroup 5th Story, who took part in the second series of The Big Reunion, alongside Kenzie from Blazin' Squad, Dane Bowers from Another Level, Kavana and Gareth Gates. Rickitt returned to the United Kingdom to continue his acting career, and in 2016, he made a guest appearance in an episode of the BBC medical soap opera Doctors.

He was then cast in the Channel 4 soap opera Hollyoaks as regular character Kyle Kelly. He left the soap in June 2020 when his character took his own life. In June 2023, it was announced that Rickitt would be returning to Doctors. His episode aired in December 2023, where he portrayed Michael Harvey.

== Personal life ==
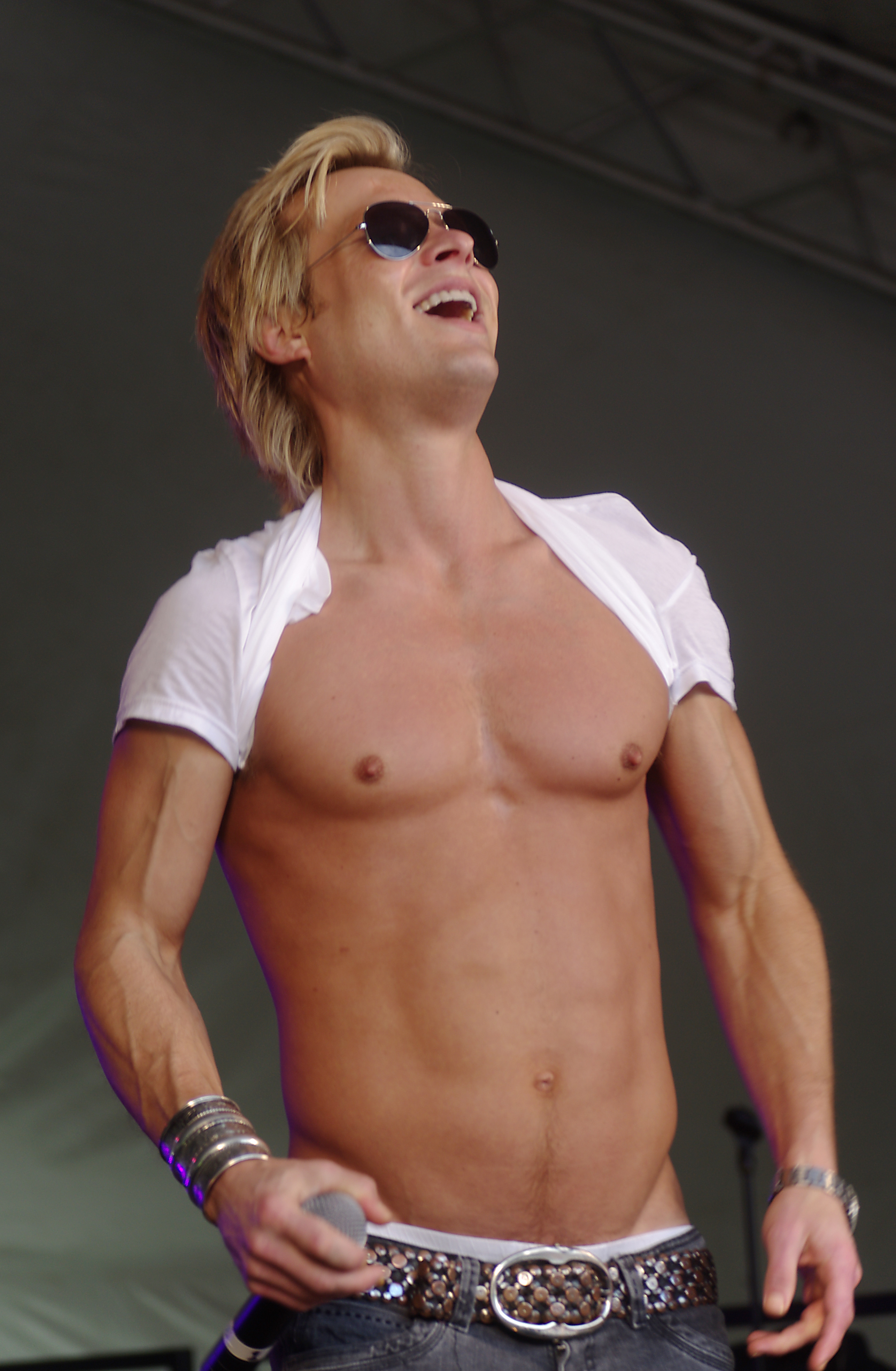
Rickitt showing his lean physique

In 1999, at a performance at The Prince's Trust Party in the Park, a member of the audience sprayed gas onto the stage when Rickitt was performing. Rickitt fainted after inhaling the substance and was taken to the hospital. He has an autoimmune disorder called ankylosing spondylitis, which made Rickitt infertile, with a sperm count of two. The disease causes the spine's vertebrae to fuse together if they remain still for too long, so Rickitt exercises for two hours daily.

Rickitt married Good Morning Britain presenter Katy Fawcett in 2014. In 2019, the couple took over an artisan bottle shop called Dexter and Jones in the Cheshire town of Knutsford.

Rickitt worked for the Royal Society for the Prevention of Cruelty to Animals as a capital appeals manager. He left in 2013 to begin working with the cancer charity Help Harry Help Others, and Chief Executive of the mental health foundation, the Caerus Partnership.

=== Legal issues ===
On 21 September 2007, Rickitt was arrested and charged with shoplifting a block of cheese, a bottle of HP sauce and a jar of coffee beans from an Auckland supermarket. During an interview with Herald on Sunday he claimed that it was an honest mistake though later claimed that he was drunk at the time of the incident.

In August 2020, Rickitt drove 600 metres whilst under the influence of alcohol to pick up a Chicken Bhuna.

== Filmography ==
Year	Title	Role	Notes
1997–1999, 2002–2004	Coronation Street	Nick Tilsley	Regular role
2001	Doctors	James Neville	Episode: "Sun God"
2005	Judge John Deed	Roy Storidge	Episode: "Popular Appeal"
2007–2010	Shortland Street	Kieran Mitchell	Regular role
2010	Whatever Happened to Pete Blaggit?	Clive	Film
2014	The Big Reunion	Himself	Contestant
2016	Doctors	Logan Flynn	Episode: "Dracula's Choice"
2017–2020	Hollyoaks	Kyle Kelly	Regular role
2020	Hollyoaks Later	Kyle Kelly	2020 special
2023	Doctors	Michael Harvey	Guest role

== Discography ==
=== Studio albums ===
List of albums, with selected chart positions
Title	Album details	Peak chart positions	
Title	Album details	UK	SCO
Good Times	Released: 18 October 1999; Formats: CD, cassette	41	68

=== Singles ===
List of singles as lead artist, with selected chart positions and certifications, showing year released and album name
Year	Single	Peak chart positions				Certifications	Album
Year	Single	UK	IRE	SCO	EUR	Certifications	Album
1999	"I Breathe Again"	5	16	6	22	UK: Silver UK sales: 200,000 (Note: (Sales as of 2019))	Good Times
1999	"Everything My Heart Desires"	15	—	16	58		Good Times
2000	"The Best Thing"	25	—	22	100		Good Times
2010	"Tonight"	—	—	—	—		Non-album single
"—" denotes a title that did not chart, or was not released in that territory.

== Awards and nominations ==
Year	Award	Category	Nominated work	Result	Ref.
1998	National Television Awards	Most Popular Newcomer	Coronation Street	Nominated	
1999	British Soap Awards	Sexiest Male	Coronation Street	Nominated	
2000	BRIT Awards	British Pop Newcomer	Himself	Nominated	
