= Good Times (Adam Rickitt album) =

Studio album by Adam Rickitt
- Released: 18 October 1999
- Genre: Pop; dance-pop
- Label: Polydor

Singles from Good Times
- 1. "I Breathe Again" Released: 14 June 1999; 2. "Everything My Heart Desires" Released: 4 October 1999; 3. "The Best Thing" Released: 24 January 2000

Good Times is the only album by British actor and singer Adam Rickitt, released in 1999. After leaving the soap opera Coronation Street, Rickitt signed a £100,000 six-album deal with Polydor Records. For his first effort he contributed to the composition of several songs, something unusual for a pop music artist more oriented towards teenagers.

Three singles were released to promote the album, the first one, "I Breathe Again", was the most successful, reaching number 5 on the UK singles chart, becoming Silver certified by BPI. "Everything My Heart Desires" was the second single; it reached number 15 on the UK chart. "Good Times" was announced as the third single, but instead the label chose "The Best Thing"; it reached number 25 in the UK. The album reached number 41 on the UK Albums Chart and did not appear on other European album charts.

Although Rickitt had said in early interviews that he would be recording his second album in 2000, Good Times became his only album and he returned to acting.

== Background and production ==
In 1997, Adam Rickitt began playing the role of Nick Tilsley in the ITV soap opera Coronation Street, a role that contributed to gaining fans, especially teenagers and gay men. Despite his success, Rickitt, then 22, left the soap in 1999 after signing a £100,000 six-album deal with music giants Polydor.

Rickitt composed most of the songs, something that was highlighted in some media outlets, in an interview he said: "Well, I've written about half the album. And when I signed the deal, it wasn't something that people expected of me. They were assuming that I'd sit there and do what I was told. But I want to be involved as much as I can". He also commentend in an interview to the Evening Mail newspaper: "[I] worked with some top people like Todd Terry and Ray Hedges. I chose all the songs and tried to get a good mix. I wanted to create an album on which every track was a possible single. There are a couple of ballads, some pop and dance and some Backstreet Boys- tracks. No regrets. There's a seventies feel on some of the songs because I love the disco music of that era but I've tried to bring it up to date for the 90s".

== Release and promotion ==
Before the first single was released, the singer tried to break his contract with the record company, which made a series of demands that ranged from how he should dress to the haircut he should use, such demands discouraged the singer who said he wasn't being himself. The label rejected the request, arguing that they had invested too much money in recording the album and would need a financial return. They gave the singer the option to record just one album and then release him from the contract, which he agreed to.

The album's promotion featured a substantial number of interviews, according to Rickitt: "I would get up at 5am, go to bed at midnight and spend the time in between doing interviews, saying exactly the same things. It was going through the motions 24/7 and it was so boring". The singer revealed that the popstar's life had turned out to be worse than he imagined: "I knew pop music especially was going to be pretty hollow," he says. "I wasn't going to put the world to rights. But I thought it would be great fun. You'd be out gigging all the time and going to parties. But the way pop is now it's 99 percent promotion, 1 percent about the product". The promotion featured a trip to Southeast Asia that contributed to the success of his singles. After the success of the album in the country, the record company rejected the idea of breaking the contract with the singer, which was broken only after a legal process.

== Singles ==
The first single was "I Breathe Again", which reached number five on the UK Singles Chart, selling 76,500 copies in its first week. The single remained on the chart for ten weeks. Outside the UK, it reached number nine in Hungary, number 16 in Ireland, and number 22 in Europe. A music video for the song was released to promote it. In some scenes, the singer appears supposedly naked, but on his official website, he revealed: "I was wearing boxer shorts most of the time, and in some camera angles, you could see them. The director asked if I would go nude for some of the scenes, and I agreed. I wasn’t backing down for anything after that. I dread to think where the footage ended up. It’s probably with one of those 'When They Were Famous' film companies!"

The second single, "Everything My Heart Desires," peaked at number 15 in its first week. In total, it remained on the chart for six weeks. The music video mixes scenes of the singer in a room with various shots in the city of London. In 2000, American singer and actress Mandy Moore recorded a cover version that was included in the re-release of her debut album, titled I Wanna Be with You.

The track "Good Times" was announced as the third single, but instead, "The Best Thing" was chosen. The song was released in a remixed version, similar to the original and simply titled "Best Thing." The music video was directed by Tim Royes and has a relatively familiar concept: the scenes alternate between a nightclub and a house party. On the UK Singles Chart, the song reached number 25, remaining on the chart for three weeks.

== Critical reception ==
Professional ratings
Review scores
Source	Rating
Sunday Mirror	8/10
New Straits Times	(Performance) (Sound)
Pop Rescue	3/5 stars

Ian Hyland, from Sunday Mirror newspaper, gave the album an 8/10 score and wrote that Rickitt "should be right proud of this sparky pop album which makes you forget he was ever a soap star". Andy Lee from The Northern Echo, wrote that it is a "fairly good album, full of sound dance tracks" and pointed "I Breathe Again" and "Good Times" as the album highlights. R.S. Murthi from the Malaysian New Straits Times newspaper, considered the album "lushly-arranged dance-pop that's not so much bad as utterly boring". Some critics brande it as "disco-fluff that would only appeal to girls under 13 and gay men under 30". At the same time, speculation about his sexuality has increased considerably in the media.

The website Pop Rescue stated that the album features strong dance pop moments, with "I Breathe Again" standing out thanks to Adam's energetic vocals. According to the review, tracks like "Good Times", "Heart And Soul", "Touch Me", and "Take You High" also work well within the disco/pop approach. However, when the album shifts toward ballads, its quality drops, resulting in songs considered monotonous or awkward, such as "I Can’t Live Without Your Love", "Time Is On Our Side", and "Give Me Your Love". Finally, although Adam contributed to the songwriting and the album includes influential pop figures, the site noted that some tracks sound generic, as if they could have been recorded by any artist who happened to show up at the studio.

== Commercial performance ==
The single "Everything My Heart Desires", peaked at #15 in the same week of the album release, while Good Times reached number 41 on the UK Albums Chart. According to Rickitt's official website, the record was certified gold in the United Kingdom, although it was not listed by the BPI. The album was certified platinum in Southeast Asia.

Rickitt mentioned in some interviews that he planned to record a second album; however, in 2000, he ended his contract with his record company, making Good Times his only studio album. In his official website he said that: "It was something I wanted to do at the time but it became something I really didn't enjoy. I don't mean the touring because I didn't mind that, the fans were great. It was hard work but I don't mind working hard if it's something which inspires me. I just don't feel that way about pop music. I started finding it rather vacant and uncreative".

== Availability ==
After years of being unavailable for streaming, the label made the album available for streaming in 2018. Unaware of a campaign to get the record label focused on the album and make it available for streaming, Rickitt was bemused when it sprung back to life, saying: "The album period wasn't my favourite but if people still like it and find it fun, that's cool. I'm happy with being the retro kitsch guy".

== Track listing ==
No.	Title	Writer(s)	Length
1.	"I Breathe Again"	Jewels & Stone	3:46
2.	"Everything My Heart Desires"	Delgado, Johnny Jam, Michael Jay	3:37
3.	"Good Times"	Howard Donald	3:39
4.	"I Can't Live Without Your Love"	Brian Rawling, Graham Stack, Steve Torch	3:47
5.	"You Make Me Believe in Love"	Delgado, J. Jam, M. Jay	3:50
6.	"Time Is on Our Side"	Adam Rickitt, Anthony Gorry, Eliot Kennedy, Mike Percy, Tim Lever	4:23
7.	"The Best Thing"	A. Rickitt, Jewels & Stone	3:26
8.	"Hold On to Our Love"	Frank Musker, H. Donald, Richard Darbyshire	3:39
9.	"Give Me Your Heart"	A. Rickitt, Dufflebag Boys	3:33
10.	"Heart and Soul"	A. Rickitt, Nigel Butler, Ray Hedges	4:03
11.	"Touch Me"	A. Rickitt, Dufflebag Boys	3:10
12.	"Take You High"	Chris Braide, Tim Laws	3:08

Japanese bonus tracks
No.	Title	Length
13.	"Believe in Us"
14.	"Dreaming"

== Charts ==
Weekly charts for Good Times
Chart (1999)	Peak position
Scottish Albums (OCC)	68
UK Albums (OCC)	41
