= The Lost Things =

The LostThings

Compilation album by Boom Crash Opera
- Released: 18 October 2013
- Recorded: various
- Genre: Rock; pop rock; pop; alternative rock
- Label: Liberation Records

Boom Crash Opera chronology
The Best Things (2013)	The LostThings (2013)	The Whole Shebang (2017)

The Lost Things is the fifth compilation album released by Australian rock band Boom Crash Opera. The album is a collection of Boom Crash Opera rarities and was released in Australian on 18 October 2013. The album was launched on 25 October 2013 at the Flyer Saucer Club in Melbourne.

Richard Pleasance said "I know the music I make now is very different to what I was up to in the eighties but heck – it rocks. Like an un-fit footy player with groin soreness; these songs for some reason never really got a guernsey."

In an interview with Beauty and Lace in February 2014 Peter Maslen said; "The rarities capture the band with our ‘pants down’ .. The tracks range from unpolished, rough and ready to fully completed work. Some of the tracks had been deemed ‘not good enough’ at the time and therefore should not go on an album."; adding "All of the rarities on The Lost Things are gems. Some are very seminal and show just how the band developed its sound. It’s like looking at an old family movie and watching the kids growing up."

The group toured the album from February to May 2014.

== Track listing ==
1. "Change" - 4:05
2. "Cheated Out of Heaven" - 4:00
3. "Rattle It Out" - 4:41
4. "Hell to Pay" - 4:09
5. "I Found My Head" - 3:58
6. "Isn't It Love?" - 4:07
7. "Right In My Face" - 3:23
8. "When She Gets There" (Launay version) - 4:09
9. "Axe to Grind" (Cooking With George version) - 6:14
10. "Sea Change" - 4:21
11. "Down to the River" - 4:51
12. "Rottenhood" - 4:16
13. "Skies Were Blue" - 4:55
14. "Fizz" - 3:34
15. "Rosebud Carnival Massacre" - 0:47

== Release history ==
Region	Date	Format	Label	Catalogue
Australia	18 October 2013	CD, Digital download	Liberation Records	LMCD0002
