= Alternative Nation festival =

Series of music festivals

Alternative Nation
- Locations: Australia: Sydney; Melbourne; Brisbane
- Years active: 1995

Alternative Nation was a series of music festivals held in Australia in 1995. It was organised by a consortium of concert promoters, Michael Coppell, Michael Chugg and Michael Gudinski and backed by the Triple M radio network as an alternative to the Big Day Out. The event was held in three cities over the Easter long weekend: Brisbane on 13 and 14 April, Sydney on 15 April and Melbourne on 16 April.

The festival had an excellent line up but suffered when both headlining acts, Red Hot Chili Peppers and Stone Temple Pilots, withdrew from the event. Lou Reed was added to the bill in their place but without the show's main drawcards, ticket sales were slow. Unlike the Big Day Out, which featured various local acts at each city, Alternative Nation's line-up was the same at all three events, except in Brisbane where four more Australian bands, Budd, Catfish, Dreamkillers and Chalk were included. Somewhat cynically, however, all of the Australian bands that performed in Melbourne and Sydney, except Def FX, were relegated to smaller stages away from the main performance area. In Melbourne, future Australian music superstars Powderfinger played on the back of a flatbed truck for a crowd of approximately 40 people.

The headlining acts were Faith No More, Lou Reed, Nine Inch Nails, Tool, Violent Femmes, Ice-T, L7, Ween, Primus, Bodycount, Pop Will Eat Itself, The Flaming Lips, The Tea Party, The Prodigy (Melbourne), Therapy?, Live and Pennywise. Local acts included Regurgitator, Horsehead, Powderfinger, Supergroove, Def FX ].

The Brisbane show experiences good weather on the first day, but was marred by rain on the second day. The track around the perimeter of the velodrome main stage venue provided some respite from the mud. Some line-up and venue changes occurred without warning such as Therapy? playing earlier than scheduled on a different stage, although the eventual return of the downpour during Faith No More's set at night seemed fitting as they played "Epic".

The Sydney show was marked by constant rain throughout the day that transformed the venue, Eastern Creek Raceway, into a mudbowl and several bands were pelted with mud by the audience. Live's Ed Kowalczyk retaliated to this behaviour by throwing a guitar into the crowd at the end of his band's set. In Melbourne the rain cleared in the afternoon and a very good set was performed by Tool in front of a fairly large crowd, the music enhanced by a very powerful sound system. In the evening, Faith No More also lived up to their reputation and kept the crowd happy, though fans were kept out of the entertainment centre by security and police where Pop Will Eat Itself and Ween were playing the festivals closing sets, leading to discontent with the promoters.

Along with the bad weather at all three shows, Alternative Nation's success was tempered by poor ticket sales and restrictions on alcohol sales at some of the venues and it was never held again.

== Locations & dates ==
- Brisbane, Chandler Sports Complex - 13 & 14 April
- Sydney, Eastern Creek Raceway- 15 April
- Melbourne, Olympic Park - 16 April

== Lineup ==
Brisbane

- Nine Inch Nails
- Faith No More
- Lou Reed
- Tool
- Pop Will Eat Itself
- Dreamkillers
- Insurge
- Body Count
- Ice-T
- Pennywise
- Andy Prieboy
- Skunkhour
- Therapy?
- Primus
- The Tea Party
- Powderfinger
- Cosmic Psychos
- Regurgitator
- Supergroove
- Horsehead
- Don Walker's Catfish
- Downtime
- L7
- Live
- The Flaming Lips
- Ween
- Def FX
- Fur
- Nitocris
- Custard
- Chalk
- Budd
