= Sand Pebbles (rock band) =

Australian band

Sand Pebbles is a psychedelic rock band from Melbourne, Australia.

== History ==
Formed on Bastille Day, 2001 on the set of Neighbours by three of the show's screenwriters Christopher Hollow (bass), Ben Michael (guitar) and Piet Collins (drums). Singer-guitarist Andrew Tanner (ex-Seven Stories) joined shortly after.

In 2003, Murray Ono (born Murray Jamieson) was drafted in on keyboards. He left in 2005 and was replaced by Tor Larsen (of Melbourne psychedelic duo The Sun Blindness) on guitar and vocals.

Following the sessions for Ceduna in 2008, Piet Collins left and was replaced by Cliff Booth (ex-Harem Scarem). In 2009, Wes Holland (also of The Sun Blindness) took over as drummer. Holland's inclusion meant there is a band member born in each decade from the 50s to the 90s.

The band splintered in early 2012, with only sparse activity in the following few years. Various members left and then briefly returned for occasional support gigs, such as with Primal Scream in 2013 and Luna.

Sand Pebbles have released six albums in Australia – Eastern Terrace (2002), Ghost Transmissions (2004), Atlantis Regrets Nothing (2006), Ceduna (2008), Dark Magic (2011) & Pleasure Maps (2017) plus an international compilation, A Thousand Wild Flowers (2009).

They have played with Arthur Lee & Love, Sonic Boom's Spectrum, Dean & Britta, Midlake, M. Ward, The Models, Primal Scream, The Drones, Tame Impala, The Moodists, and The Church. They were reputedly banned from the Meredith Music Festival for allegedly invading the stage during Rose Tattoo's set in 2006.

Their songs have been featured on a variety of Australian television shows including The Secret Life of Us, Last Man Standing, and Neighbours.

== Discography ==
*Eastern Terrace (2002): A Camera Obscura release and the band's full-length debut. It contained songs like "My Sensation", "Moving Too Fast" and a cover of Julian Cope's "Out of My Mind on Dope and Speed". Francois Couture, writing for Allmusic, announced: "The presence of a (very fine) cover version of Julian Cope's "Out of My Mind on Dope and Speed" is not an innocent move. This group has clear Krautrock influences (listen to "The Sundowner" for a one-chord extended jam) and an appetite for catchy melodies – two defining characteristics of Cope's songs."

*Ghost Transmissions (2004): A Raoul Records release, produced by Murray Jamieson. It includes a cover of the Skip Spence song, "All My Life (I Love You), "The Day Summer Fell" and the 12-minute epic "Black Sun Ensemble", which UK critic Stewart Lee noted in The Sunday Times "is one of those unforgettable, hypnotic, slow-burning, snake-charming epics that comes along once in a generation.

*Atlantis Regrets Nothing (2006): The debut release on the Sensory Projects label, produced by Murray Jamieson. It features a track co-written with Dave Graney ("Natalie"), another featuring Luna's Dean Wareham ("Howard's End") and saw the band expand their sound to include brass and strings. The ABC's Jarrod Watt called it "psychedelic rock that doesn't disappear up its own tambourine."

*Ceduna (2008): The band's second release on the Sensory Projects label, produced by James Dean was written and partially recorded at Cactus, a surf beach on the Great Australian Bight. It featured songs such as "Wild Season", "Future Proofed (both with videos by Australian director, Adam White) and "Red, Orange, Purple and Blue". David Nichols, writing for Mess + Noise, wrote: "I listened to it in a car wash and would recommend that."

*A Thousand Wild Flowers (2009): An international release on Dean Wareham and Britta Phillips' label, Double Feature Records, produced by Malcolm McDowell, James Dean, and Murray Jamieson. It combines tracks from three of their Australia-only albums, rare live cuts ("Nathalie", "Short Term memory Loss") plus a cover of The 13th Floor Elevators song "I Don't Ever Want to Come Down".
Mojo magazine noted the album's "snaking guitar licks and latter day Velvets rhythmic churn." It was also favourably reviewed by The Times.

*Dark Magic (2011): Released on the Dot Dash Recordings/Remote Control Records label in August 2011, 'Dark Magic' was produced by Malcolm McDowell and featured mixes and cameos by Tim Holmes (Death in Vegas), Will Carruthers (Spacemen 3, Spiritualized) and Britta Phillips (Luna).

*Pleasure Maps (2017) : Released on the Kasumuen label in 2017, Pleasure Maps was produced by Malcolm McDowell & James Dean and featured special guests Steve McLennan, Amaya Laucirica, Tom Baker & Gareth Skinner.
