= Serious Young Insects =

- Origin: Australia
- Genres: Pop rock
- Years active: 1980–1983
- Labels: Native Tongue, Epic Records

Serious Young Insects were a short lived Australian pop rock band formed in 1980. The group released one studio album and three singles.

== History ==
Serious Young Insects formed in 1980 with Peter Farnan on vocals and guitar, Michael Vallance on vocals and bass guitar and Mark White on vocals and drums. Australian musicologist, Ian McFarlane, described Serious Young Insects as a "quirky, three-piece Melbourne new wave band".

All three members of Serious Young Insects wrote and sang lead vocals on their songs. The group's first single, "Trouble Understanding Words", was written and sung by Farnan and was issued in 1981. Despite production by Peter McIan (who was guiding Men At Work to chart success at this same time), the song didn't chart. In May 1982, they released the album, Housebreaking, which featured two singles; lead single "Be Patient" was written and sung by White and made the lower reaches of the Australian charts, peaking at #63. The album's second and final single, "Faraway Places", was written and sung by Vallance and did not chart.

Lisa Perry of The Canberra Times reviewing the album in May 1982 noted that "several times I had to check the cover to see if there were not also some session musos or others contributing to the sounds I was hearing. For a three-piece combo, these lads sure make a good sound". Richard Pleasance, a classically trained guitarist, was a fan and briefly joined the group before it broke up in the following year.

Pleasance and Farnan went on to co-found the group Boom Crash Opera, which had 10 top-40 hits in Australia in the 1980s and 90s. Vallance was also a member for a short time in 1991-92.

== Discography ==
=== Albums ===
Title	Details
Housebreaking	Released: May 1982; Label: Native Tongue (ELPS 4294); Formats: Cassette, LP

=== Singles ===
List of singles, with Australian chart positions
Year	Title	Peak chart positions	Album
Year	Title	AUS	Album
1981	"Trouble Understanding Words"	-	non album single
1982	"Be Patient"	63	Housebreaking
1982	"Faraway Places"	-	Housebreaking
