= Rachael Kane =

Australian singer

- Born: Australia
- Origin: Australia
- Genres: Pop
- Occupations: Singer; songwriter
- Instrument: Vocals
- Years active: 2002-present
- Labels: Roadshow Music (2002-2003)
- Website: www.rachaelkane.com

Rachael Kane is an Australian pop singer, who released one studio album in 2003, produced by Peter Farnan.

Following its release, Kane took an extended break from music to reconsider her purpose with music and how she felt to go forward, later opening a business called Connected Voice, where she supports people to re-connect to their natural voice and express themselves freely in singing and in everyday life.

In 2021, Kane released Space with Benjamin Hurt.

== Discography ==
=== Albums ===
List of albums, with selected details
Title	Details
Appetite	Released: 2003; Format: CD; Label: Roadshow Music (300825-2)
Space (with Benjamin Hurt)	Released: 2021; Format: CD, Digital; Label: self-released

=== Singles ===
List of singles, with selected chart positions
Title	Year	Peak chart positions	Album
Title	Year	AUS	Album
"Happy Messy Love"	2002	56	Appetite
"Closer to You"	2002	79	Appetite
"All We Really Want"	2002	-	Appetite
"Jumping Out of My Skin"	2003	-	Appetite
