= I Breathe Again =

1999 single by Adam Rickitt

Single by Adam Rickitt

from the album Good Times
- B-side: "Stars Are Falling"
- Released: 14 June 1999
- Genre: Hi-NRG
- Length: 3:46
- Label: Polydor
- Songwriters: Jewels & Stone
- Producers: Jewels & Stone

Adam Rickitt singles chronology
"I Breathe Again" (1999)	"Everything My Heart Desires" (1999)

"I Breathe Again" is a song by English singer and former Coronation Street actor Adam Rickitt. Released on 14 June 1999 as Rickitt's debut single, it peaked at number five on the UK Singles Chart, selling 76,500 copies and staying on the chart for 10 weeks. Outside the United Kingdom, "I Breathe Again" peaked at number nine in Hungary and number 16 in Ireland.

A music video for the song was released to promote the single. Some scenes in which he appears naked surprised some fans. On his official website he said: "I had boxers on for part of it but in some of the camera angles you could see them. The director asked if I'd go starkers for some of the shots and I agreed. I wasn't getting off the floor for anything after that. I dread to think where the off-shoots went. They're probably with one of those When They Were Famous film companies!"

== Track listings ==
UK CD1

1. "I Breathe Again"
2. "Stars Are Falling"
3. "The True Confessions of Adam Rickitt" (interview)
4. "I Breathe Again" (video)

UK CD2

1. "I Breathe Again" (radio edit)
2. "I Breathe Again" (Amen extended mix)
3. "I Breathe Again" (The Sharp Boys extended remix)

UK cassette single

1. "I Breathe Again"
2. "I Breathe Again" (Jewels & Stone extended mix)

Japanese CD single

1. "I Breathe Again"
2. "I Breathe Again" (Amen extended mix)
3. "I Breathe Again" (The Sharp Boys extended remix)
4. "I Breathe Again" (Jewels & Stone extended mix)

== Charts ==
=== Weekly charts ===
Chart (1999)	Peak position
Europe (Eurochart Hot 100)	22
Hungary (Mahasz)	9
Ireland (IRMA)	16
Scottish Singles Sales (Official Charts)	6
UK Singles (Official Charts)	5

=== Year-end charts ===
Chart (1999)	Position
UK Singles (OCC)	86

== Certifications and sales ==
Region	Certification	Certified units/sales
United Kingdom (BPI)	Silver	200,000^{^}
^{^} Shipments figures based on certification alone.

== Release history ==
Region	Date	Format(s)	Label(s)	Ref.
United Kingdom	14 June 1999	CD; cassette	Polydor	
Japan	13 January 2000	CD	Polydor	
