= Everything My Heart Desires =

Single by Adam Rickitt

from the album Good Times
- B-side: "You Got Me Good"
- Released: 4 October 1999
- Genre: Dance-pop
- Length: 3:39
- Label: Polydor
- Songwriters: Delgado, Johnny Jam, Michael Jay

Adam Rickitt singles chronology
"I Breathe Again" (1999)	"Everything My Heart Desires" (1999)	"The Best Thing" (2000)

"Everything My Heart Desires" is the second single by English singer Adam Rickitt. A review published in Music Week on September 11, 1999, described the single as a Euro-dance track aimed at a specific audience, while noting doubts about its potential to replicate the artist's previous top five chart success. The single debuted at number fifteen on the UK singles chart and stayed on the chart for six weeks. The song was covered by the singer Mandy Moore for her album I Wanna Be with You (2000).

== Track listing ==
CD 1

1. "Everything My Heart Desires" - 3:39
2. "You Got Me Good" - 3:36
3. "Album Megamix" - 6:31
4. "Everything My Heart Desires" (video) - 3:39

CD 2

1. "Everything My Heart Desires" - 3:38
2. "Everything My Heart Desires" (Jewels & Stone My Heart Goes Bang Mix) - 6:14
3. "Everything My Heart Desires" (Sharp Razor Club Mix) - 7:14

Cassette

1. "Everything My Heart Desires" - 3:39
2. "Everything My Heart Desires" (Beatmasters 12" Mix) - 4:50

12" vinyl promo

1. "Everything My Heart Desires"
2. "Everything My Heart Desires" (Jewel's & Stone's My Heart Goes Bang Mix)
3. "Everything My Heart Desires" (Beatmasters 12" Mix)
4. "Everything My Heart Desires" (Sharp Razor Club Mix)

== Charts ==
Weekly charts for "Everything My Heart Desires"
Chart (1999–2000)	Peak position
Estonia (Eesti Top 20)	15
Europe (Eurochart Hot 100)	58
Scotland Singles (OCC)	16
UK Singles (OCC)	15
