= Fabulous Beast =

Studio album by Boom Crash Opera
- Released: 23 March 1993
- Genre: Pop rock, rock
- Label: EastWest
- Producer: Boom Crash Opera, Don Gehman, Keith Forsey

Boom Crash Opera chronology
Dreams on Fire (1991)	Fabulous Beast (1993)	Born (1995)

Singles from Fabulous Beast
- 1. "Bettadaze" Released: November 1992; 2. "In the Morning" Released: March 1993; 3. "This Isn't Love" Released: August 1993

Fabulous Beast is the third studio album released by Australian rock group Boom Crash Opera. The album was released in March 1993 and peaked at number 15 on the ARIA Charts.

Richard Pleasance left the band in 1992, midway through the recording of this album, after he was diagnosed with Tinnitus. He is credited with playing on the album, and with co-writing some material, but is not pictured as a full group member.

Farnan later said, "It's a dreadful record. We had some great songs that didn't get recorded and the record company kept saying they don't hear a single. Nirvana was breaking through across the world and our A&R guy was banging on about Pat Benatar. I said, "Forget about Pat Benatar. Looks what's on TV. The 80s are over!'"

== Track listing ==
No.	Title	Writer(s)	Producer(s)	Length
1.	"My Revelation"	Peter Farnan; Dale Ryder; Greg O'Connor; Dorian West	Keith Forsey	5:46
2.	"This Isn't Love"	Ryder	Don Gehman	3:30
3.	"In the Morning"	Farnan; O'Connor	Gehman	3:57
4.	"Bettadaze"	Farnan; O'Connor; Ryder	Forsey	4:01
5.	"The Colour of Love"	Farnan	Forsey	4:35
6.	"Strike a Match"	Farnan	Gehman	3:47
7.	"Look Up What's Coming Down"	Farnan	Forsey	4:13
8.	"What a Goodnight"	Farnan	Forsey	4:37
9.	"You Wouldn't Want to Know"	Farnan; Richard Pleasance	Gehman	4:08
10.	"I Am Nature"	Pleasance; West	Gehman	4:27
11.	"Don't Let On"	Farnan	Forsey	4:07
12.	"The Last Place on Earth"	Farnan; O'Connor	Boom Crash Opera	4:53

== Personnel ==
Boom Crash Opera

- Dale Ryder — lead vocals, harmonica
- Peter Farnan — guitars, backing vocals
- Richard Pleasance — guitars, backing vocals
- Greg O'Connor — keyboards, guitars, programming
- Peter Maslen — drums, backing vocals, percussion

== Charts ==
Chart (1993)	Peak position
Australian Albums (ARIA)	15
