= The Best Thing (Adam Rickitt song) =

Single by Adam Rickitt

from the album Good Times
- B-side: "Dreaming"
- Released: 24 January 2000
- Genre: Dance-pop
- Length: 3:24
- Label: Polydor
- Songwriters: Adam Rickitt and Jewels & Stone

Adam Rickitt singles chronology
"Everything My Heart Desires" (1999)	"The Best Thing" (2000)	"Tonight" (2010)

"The Best Thing" (also known as "Best Thing") is the third single by the British singer, Adam Rickitt. In an interview with the Sunday Herald about the song's composition, the artist said that he had already written about half of Good Times and wanted to be actively involved in the creative process, sometimes contributing only lyrics, but adding that "with "Best Thing" I was there from the first stage, figuring out the melodies, figuring out what sounds to go on, how it should be produced".

The single peaked at number 25 on the UK singles chart and stayed on the chart for three weeks. The music video of the song was directed by Tim Royes.

== Track listing ==
Single (CD 1)

1. "Best Thing" (single mix) - 3:24
2. "Dreaming" - 3:11
3. "I Breathe Again" (Blade Radio mix) - 4:14
4. "Best Thing" (video) - 3:24

Single (CD 2)

1. "Best Thing" (single mix) - 3:23
2. "Best Thing" (Phats & Small 12" mix)" - 6:51
3. "Best Thing" (The Sharp Boys 'N' Adam) - 7:12

Vinyl promo 12"

1. "Best Thing" (Phats & Small 12" mix)
2. "Best Thing" (Jewels & Stone extended mix)
3. "Best Thing" (The Sharp Boys 'N' Adam)
4. "Best Thing" (single mix)

== Charts ==
Weekly chart performance for "The Best Thing"
Chart (2000)	Peak position
Europe (Eurochart Hot 100)	100
Scotland Singles (OCC)	22
UK Singles (OCC)	25
