= Sun Theory (band) =

- Also known as: Cow
- Origin: Adelaide, South Australia, Australia
- Genres: Country rock, folk, roots
- Years active: 2000–present
- Members: Michael Boundy; Sam Carpenter; Richard Coldwell; Glyn Lehmann; Anthony Scott
- Past members: Stephen McBeath
- Website: suntheory.bandcamp.com

Sun Theory are an Australian rock-country band which formed in 2000 as Cow. They released three albums as Cow and, since 2011, two more as Sun Theory. The group is composed of Michael Boundy on bass guitar, Sam Carpenter on drums, Richard Coldwell and Anthony Scott on guitars, and Glyn Lehmann on keyboards.

== History ==
Sun Theory were formed in 2000 as Cow, in Adelaide, as a country rock band. They released three albums under that name. Their musical style is influenced by bands such as Wilco.

Sunset Posse (August 2008) was issued as Cow's second album with Boundy on bass guitar, Carpenter on percussion, Coldwell on guitars, vocals and harmonica, Lehmann on piano, hammond organ and piano accordion, Steve McBeath on percussion, backing vocals and tambo, and Scott on guitars, backing vocals and bass guitar. It was co-produced by Lehmann and Scott and was recorded, mixed and mastered at Six Strings Audio Studio and at Mixmasters.

For Cow's third album, The Long Ride (September 2009), with Boundy on bass guitar, Coldwell on vocals and acoustic guitar, Lehmann on piano, organ and altonium, McBeath on drums and percussion, and Scott on guitar and backing vocals. It was recorded at The Loft in Bridgewater by Michael Hutton, and at Sixstrings Studio and Lean2 Studio by Lehmann and Scott, with Coldwell and Scott producing. Music reviewer, Phil Catley, described their sonation as "alt-country" and the work as "Melancholy, uplifting, lyrical and musical, these songs contemplate the simple yet complex relationships and emotions that frame the lives of ordinary folk. Folk like you and me... [It] is an enriching experience. With its lyrical depth and musical maturity it is the work of seasoned musicians and artists."

They play live shows at small venues across Australia, mainly South Australia. The name was changed by May 2011 as a way of refreshing the band's image. The group has five members: Michael Boundy on bass guitar, Sam Carpenter on drums, Richard Coldwell and Anthony Scott on guitars, and Glyn Lehmann on keyboards. Individuals have worked together before the formation of the band. Some of the band's members have played on the same stage as bands such as Midnight Oil and INXS.

Sun Theory was issued in October 2011 as the renamed group's first album. HW Bones of Music SA described it as "Everything about it is pleasant – the simple but stand out album cover (which would make a lovely T-shirt), the full but sparse recording quality, and the thoughtful but easy listening lyrics."

On 24 April 2015 they released a second album, Fine Dust, with its launch held at the Wheatsheaf in Thebarton.

== Song production ==
All of Sun Theory's lyrics are written by Coldwell, with some music written by Lehmann. The songs were recorded at Scott's recording studio in Bridgewater until 2012. The band currently records their albums at Lehmann's residence in the Adelaide Hills.

== Members ==
- Michael Boundy – bass guitar
- Sam Carpenter – drums, percussion
- Richard Coldwell – vocals, acoustic guitar, harmonica
- Glyn Lehmann – piano, hammond organ, piano accordion, altonium
- Anthony Scott – lead guitar, bass guitar, backing vocals
- Stephen McBeath – percussion, backing vocals, tambo (ca. 2008–09)

=== Backing members ===
- Gypsy Lehmann – backing vocals
- Django Scott – trumpet solo ("Beautiful Ghost")

== Discography ==
Cow

- Cow (2006)
- Sunset Posse (2008)
- The Long Ride (20 September 2009)

Sun Theory

- Sun Theory (16 October 2011)
- Fine Dust (24 April 2015)
