= Love Me to Death =

Single by Boom Crash Opera

from the album Boom Crash Opera
- Released: 1988
- Genre: Rock
- Length: 3:55; 4:25 (extended mix)
- Label: WEA
- Songwriter(s): Peter Farnan, Richard Pleasance
- Producer(s): Alex Sadkin (tracks: 1 & 2)

Boom Crash Opera singles chronology
"Her Charity" (1987)	"Love Me to Death" (1988)	"Onion Skin" (1989)

"Love Me to Death" is a song by Australian rock band Boom Crash Opera, released in 1988. It is the fifth and final single to be released from Boom Crash Opera's debut album Boom Crash Opera. It peaked at number 72 on the Kent Music Report.

== Track listing ==
7" single

1. Love Me to Death (Peter Farnan, Richard Pleasance) - 3:55
2. Bombshell (P. Farnan, R. Pleasance) - 3:47

12" single

1. Love Me to Death (P. Farnan, R. Pleasance) - 4:25
2. Fire Inside the Island (P. Farnan, R. Pleasance) - 3:27
3. Bombshell (extended mix) (P. Farnan, R. Pleasance) - 6:03

== Personnel ==
- Peter Maslen – drums, vocals
- Greg O'Connor – keyboards
- Dale Ryder – lead vocals
- Richard Pleasance – guitar, bass, vocals
- Peter Farnan – guitar, vocals

Production

- Engineer – Will Gosling (tracks: 1 & 2)
- Producer – Alex Sadkin (tracks: 1 & 2)

== Charts ==
=== Weekly charts ===
Chart (1988)	Peak position
Australia (Kent Music Report)	72
