= Tongue Tied (Boom Crash Opera song) =

1995 single by Boom Crash Opera

- CD single cover

Single by Boom Crash Opera

from the album Born
- B-side: "More Is More"
- Released: January 1995
- Studio: Deterrer
- Length: 2:59
- Label: Ariola, BMG
- Songwriter: Peter Farnan
- Producer: Peter Farnan

Boom Crash Opera singles chronology
"Gimme" (1994)	"Tongue Tied" (1995)	"Dissemble" (1995)

"Tongue Tied" is a song by Australian pop rock band Boom Crash Opera, written and produced by founding member Peter Farnan. The song was released in January 1995 as the second single from their fourth studio album, Born (1995), and peaked at number 25 on the Australian Singles Chart. As of 2026, it is their most recent top-50 hit in Australia.

== Track listing ==
Australian CD single

1. "Tongue Tied"
2. "Tongue Tied" (Tastes Like an Ashtray mix)
3. "Tongue Tied" (Gurgulurmix)
4. "Tongue Tied" (Candy Probe mix)
5. "More Is More"

== Charts ==
Chart (1995)	Peak position
Australia (ARIA)	25
