= Dreams on Fire (EP) =

EP by Boom Crash Opera
- Released: November 1991
- Genre: Rock
- Label: East West Records / Warner Music Australia
- Producer: Boom Crash Opera

Boom Crash Opera chronology
Look! Listen!! (1990)	Dreams on Fire (1991)	Fabulous Beast (1993)

Dreams on Fire is the first extended play by Australian rock group Boom Crash Opera. The EP was released in November 1991.

== Track listing ==
1. "Holy Water" - 3:58
2. "Hell to Pay" - 3:35
3. "Skies Are Blue" - 4:36
4. "Antarctica" - 5:06
- Tracks 2 and 3 recorded "live at the wireless" Triple J on 18 August 1991.

== Charts ==
Chart (1991)	Peak position
Australia (ARIA)	44
