= Her Charity =

Single by Boom Crash Opera

from the album Boom Crash Opera
- Released: 1987
- Genre: Rock
- Length: 4:58; 6:46 (dance mix)
- Label: WEA
- Songwriters: Peter Farnan, Richard Pleasance
- Producer: Alex Sadkin

Boom Crash Opera singles chronology
"City Flat" (1987)	"Her Charity" (1987)	"Love Me to Death" (1988)

"Her Charity" is the fourth single by Australian band Boom Crash Opera, released in 1987. It was the fourth single to be released from the band's self-title album. It peaked at number 32 on the Kent Music Report. The song is about Miss America Beauty pageants. There are two versions of the music vidro: 1) Australian cersion with thevspinning camera amd 2).USA version with the band playing in a srudio.

== Track listing ==
1. "Her Charity" (Peter Farnan, Richard Pleasance) – 4:58
2. "The Face That I'm Living In" (Dale Ryder, Greg O'Connor, Peter Maslen) – 2:52
3. "Her Charity" (Dance Mix) (Farnan, Pleasance) – 6:46

== Personnel ==
- Peter Maslen – drums, vocals
- Greg O'Connor – keyboards
- Dale Ryder – lead vocals
- Richard Pleasance – guitar, bass, vocals
- Peter Farnan – guitar, vocals

Production

- Engineer – Will Gosling (tracks: 1 & 2)
- Producer – Alex Sadkin (tracks: 1 & 2)
- Remix – Phil Thornalley (tracks: 3)
- Producer – Peter Farnan, Richard Pleasance (tracks: 3)

== Charts ==
=== Weekly charts ===
Chart (1987)	Peak position
Australia (Kent Music Report)	32
