= Boom Crash Opera (album) =

Studio album by Boom Crash Opera
- Released: September 1987
- Recorded: January–February 1987
- Studio: RAK Studios, London
- Genre: Rock
- Label: WEA Records
- Producer: Alex Sadkin

Boom Crash Opera chronology
Boom Crash Opera (1987)	These Here Are Crazy Times (1989)

Singles from Boom Crash Opera
- 1. "Great Wall" Released: May 1986; 2. "Hands Up in the Air" Released: July 1986; 3. "City Flat" Released: June 1987; 4. "Her Charity" Released: September 1987; 5. "Love Me to Death" Released: March 1988

Boom Crash Opera is the first album by Australian rock band Boom Crash Opera, released in 1987. Singles released from the album include two which reached the top 20 on the Australian Kent Music Report Singles Chart, "Great Wall" and "Hands Up in the Air".

== Background ==
In 1986 Boom Crash Opera signed with Dirty Pool Management and WEA Records. The band recorded their first two singles in 1986 with English producer Steve Brown (ABC, The Cult and Wham!) at Platinum Studios in Melbourne. Their debut single, "Great Wall", which was released in May 1986 reached No. 5 on the (Australian) national chart. Their second single, "Hands up in the Air", followed in late July, peaking at No. 16. Following which the band toured nationally with Icehouse.

At the ARIA Music Awards of 1987 the group were nominated for three awards: Highest Selling Single for "Great Wall", Best New Talent for both singles, and Best Video for "Hands up in the Air". At the Countdown Music and Video Awards of 1986, held in July 1987, "Great Wall" won Best Debut Single.

The label then flew the band to London to record their debut album at RAK Studios with producer, Alex Sadkin (Simply Red, Grace Jones, Talking Heads) and engineer, Will Gosling (Big Country). Both "Great Wall" and "Hands up in the Air" were remixed for their album versions. After recording the album Sadkin travelled to the Bahamas to work, where he died in a car accident in July. The self-titled album was released in September 1987, reached No. 19 on the Kent Music Report Albums Chart and went on to achieve Gold record status. It spawned a further three singles, "City Flat" (June 1987), "Her Charity" (September 1987) and "Love Me to Death" (March 1988).

== Recording ==
In an interview, Farnan said "The whole idea of the album was to capture a live band feel, rather than a meticulously layered, constructed studio artist sound. We just wanted to capture a fairly live feel and wanted people feeling there were musicians playing and performing, rather than, you know, machines."

Elsewhere, Farnan said he was initially unsure of producer Sadkin. He said, "He just seemed like a strange, quiet, remote guy with no sense of humour. He didn't touch knobs and he didn't play an instrument. He just sat there and said 'It's good when you do that.' Gradually we realised he was just the sweetest guy. No ego at all." Farnan also praised Sadkin's ability to the keep the band away from label pressure.

Pleasance later said, "I think we overshot it. The album to me just sounds like it was overthought. I think if we had worked with someone locally it would have been a closer representation of us."

== Track listing ==
Boom Crash Opera
No.	Title	Writer(s)	Note	Length
1.	"Gap That Opened"	P. Farnan, R. Pleasance, D. Ryder, P. Maslen		4:00
2.	"Hands Up in the Air"	P. Farnan, R. Pleasance		3:49
3.	"Love Me to Death"	P. Farnan, R. Pleasance		4:25
4.	"City Flat"	P. Farnan, R. Pleasance		4:06
5.	"Her Charity"	P. Farnan, R. Pleasance		4:58
6.	"Sleeping Time"	P. Farnan, R. Pleasance		4:22
7.	"Great Wall"	R. Pleasance, D. Ryder		3:49
8.	"Bombshell"	P. Farnan, R. Pleasance		3:47
9.	"Caught Between Two Towns"	P. Farnan, R. Pleasance, D. Ryder, W. Zygier		3:27
10.	"Too Hot to Think"	P. Farnan, R. Pleasance	Alex Sadkin is credited for the use of a fire extinguisher	5:24
Total length:				42:07

== Personnel ==
- Peter Maslen – drums, vocals
- Greg O'Connor – keyboards
- Dale Ryder – lead vocals
- Richard Pleasance – guitar, bass, vocals
- Peter Farnan – guitar, vocals

=== Additional musicians ===
- Frank Riccotti – percussion

=== Production ===
- Art Direction – Jeri Heiden
- Engineer – Chris Corr
- Cover Design – Greg O'Connor
- Mastering – Ted Jensen
- Photography – Carrie Branovan
- Producer, Mixing – Alex Sadkin (tracks: "Gap That Opened", "Love Me to Death", "City Flat", "Her Charity", "Sleeping Time", "Bombshell", "Caught Between Two Towns", "Too Hot to Think")
- Producer – Steve Brown (tracks: "Hands up in the Air", "Great Wall")
- Associate Producer – Richard Pleasance (tracks: "Gap That Opened", "Love Me to Death", "City Flat", "Her Charity", "Sleeping Time", "Bombshell", "Caught Between Two Towns", "Too Hot to Think")
- Associate Producer – Peter Farnan (tracks: "Gap That Opened", "Love Me to Death", "City Flat", "Her Charity", "Sleeping Time", "Bombshell", "Caught Between Two Towns", "Too Hot to Think")
- Recording – Roy Spong (tracks: "Gap That Opened", "Love Me to Death", "City Flat", "Her Charity", "Sleeping Time", "Bombshell", "Caught Between Two Towns", "Too Hot to Think")
- Recording, Mixing – Will Gosling (tracks: "Gap That Opened", "Love Me to Death", "City Flat", "Her Charity", "Sleeping Time", "Bombshell", "Caught Between Two Towns", "Too Hot to Think")

== Charts ==
Chart (1987)	Peak position
Australian (Kent Music Report)	19

== Certifications ==
Region	Certification	Certified units/sales
Australia (ARIA)	Gold	35,000^{^}
^{^} Shipments figures based on certification alone.

== Release history ==
Year	Country	Format	Label	Catalogue No.
1987	AUS	Vinyl album	WEA Records	254927-1
1987	AUS	CD	WEA Records	254927-2
1987	US	Vinyl album	Warner Bros	1-25636
