= City Flat =

Single by Boom Crash Opera

from the album Boom Crash Opera
- Released: 1987
- Recorded: January–February 1987
- Studio: RAK Studios, London
- Genre: Rock
- Length: 4:02; 6:34 (extended mix)
- Label: WEA
- Songwriter(s): Peter Farnan, Richard Pleasance
- Producer(s): Alex Sadkin

Boom Crash Opera singles chronology
"Hands Up in the Air" (1986)	"City Flat" (1987)	"Her Charity" (1987)

"City Flat" is a song by Australian rock band Boom Crash Opera, released in 1987 as the third single from their self-titled studio album. It was written by the band's two main songwriters: guitarist Peter Farnan and bass player Richard Pleasance. The song peaked at number 42 in Australia.

Music critic Stuart Coupe called it "one of the more outstanding tracks" from the band's debut album. "It was written at a pretty bleak time," Farnan told Coupe. "We literally were hanging around kitchens drinking coffee saying ‘how are we going to get [the band] going, and what are we doing?’ You really feel like you're not getting anywhere.”

Producer Sadkin was convinced the song would be a hit. Farnan later said, "It wasn't a hit. We called it 'City Flop'. But he made sure that record got made to a high glossy standard."

== Track listing ==
1. "City Flat" (Peter Farnan, Richard Pleasance) – 4:02
2. "Spirit of Progress" (Peter Farnan, Richard Pleasance, Dale Ryder, Peter Maslen) – 3:51
3. "City Flat" (Extended Mix) (Peter Farnan, Richard Pleasance) – 6:34

== Personnel ==
- Peter Farnan – guitar, vocals
- Peter Maslen – drums, vocals
- Greg O'Connor – keyboards
- Richard Pleasance – guitar, bass, vocals
- Dale Ryder – lead vocals

== Charts ==
=== Weekly charts ===
Chart (1987)	Peak position
Australia (Kent Music Report)	42
