= These Here Are Crazy Times =

These Here Are Crazy Times!

Studio album by Boom Crash Opera
- Released: October 1989
- Recorded: Metropolis Audio in Melbourne, Australia
- Genre: Rock
- Length: 47:10
- Label: WEA
- Producers: Pete Smith, Richard Pleasance & Jimmy Iovine for 2 re-recorded songs on the North American release.

Boom Crash Opera chronology
Boom Crash Opera (1987)	These Here Are Crazy Times! (1989)	Look! Listen!! (1990)

Singles from These Here Are Crazy Times
- 1. "Onion Skin" Released: June 1989; 2. "Get Out of the House!" Released: September 1989; 3. "The Best Thing" Released: November 1989; 4. "Dancing in the Storm" Released: March 1990; 5. "Talk About It" Released: June 1990

These Here Are Crazy Times! is the second studio album by Australian rock group Boom Crash Opera, released in October 1989. The album was the breakthrough album to the lucrative U.S. Market for the band & was released in the United States by Giant records. This release had 2 new reworked versions of the songs "Talk About It" and "The Best Thing". Both songs were re-recorded with producer Jimmy Iovine of U2 fame, after Bono from U2 became a fan of the band during the U2 Love Town tour of Australia in 1989.

== Recording ==
The album was produced by Pete Smith, but the band were unhappy with his mixing. Farnan said, "He kept trying and he wasn't getting anywhere." It was suggested that mixing be done by Nick Launay, which the band had been hesitant to use due to comparisons to INXS. Farnan said, "We used to obsess over the drum sounds he created on The Pleasure of Your Company and The Swing. He mixed our second record and saved our bacon." Richard Pleasance was less happy with Smith's production and the cost to fly him to Australia, saying, "We didn't really click with him. We sacked him. Maz put him in a car and took him back to the airport."

== Track listings ==
=== Australia ===
No.	Title	Length
1.	"Onion Skin"	3:28
2.	"Where There's A Will"	3:59
3.	"The Best Thing"	4:13
4.	"Piece Of The Pie"	4:54
5.	"Forever"	3:56
6.	"Get Out of the House!"	3:18
7.	"Talk About It"	4:02
8.	"End Up Where I Started"	3:13
9.	"Dancing in the Storm"	4:12
10.	"Mountain Of Strength"	4:09
11.	"Axe To Grind"	3:03
12.	"Superheroes"	4:43

== Track listing ==
No.	Title	Length
1.	"Onion Skin"
2.	"Talk About It?!"
3.	"The Best Thing"
4.	"Piece Of The Pie"
5.	"Get Out Of The House"
6.	"Mountain Of Strength"
7.	"Dancing In The Storm"
8.	"Forever"
9.	"Axe To Grind"
10.	"Where There's A Will"

== Personnel ==
- Dale Ryder — lead vocals
- Peter Farnan — guitars, backing vocals, bass
- Richard Pleasance — guitars, backing vocals, bass
- Greg O'Connor — keyboards
- Peter Maslen — drums, backing vocals

Additional personnel

- Chris Wilson — harp on "End Up Where I Started" and "Axe To Grind"
- Brasstards — horns on "End Up Where I Started"

== Charts ==
=== Weekly charts ===
Chart (1989/90)	Position
Australian Albums (ARIA)	10

=== Year-end charts ===
Chart (1989)	Position
ARIA Albums Chart	97

== Certifications ==
Region	Certification	Certified units/sales
Australia (ARIA)	2× Platinum	140,000^{^}
^{^} Shipments figures based on certification alone.
