= Talk About It (song) =

- Maxi single cover

Single by Boom Crash Opera

from the album These Here Are Crazy Times
- Released: 24 June 1990
- Genre: Rock, pop
- Length: 4:40
- Label: WEA
- Songwriters: Peter Farnan, Peter Maslen, Dale Ryder, Richard Pleasance, Greg O'Connor
- Producers: Pete Smith, Richard Pleasance

Boom Crash Opera singles chronology
"Dancing in the Storm" (1990)	"Talk About It" (1990)	"The Best Thing (Listen mix)" (1990)

"Talk About It" is a song by Australian band, Boom Crash Opera. The song was released in June 1990 as the fifth and final single from their second studio album, These Here Are Crazy Times! (1989).

== Track listing ==
Maxi

1. "Talk About It!" (Iovine Version) - 4:40
2. "Great Wall" (Live) - 4:04
3. "Piece of the Pie" (Live) - 4:40
4. "Ordinary Heaven" - 3:20
5. "Talk About It!" (Pleasance Version) - 4:02
- Tracks 2, 3 were recorded live at Festival Hall (Melbourne).

7"

1. "Talk About It!" (Iovine Version) - 4:40
2. "Talk About It!" (Pleasance Version) - 4:02

== Charts ==
Chart (1990)	Peak position
Australia (ARIA)	35
US Cash Box Top 100	85
