= Gimme (Boom Crash Opera song) =

1994 single by Boom Crash Opera

- CD single cover

Single by Boom Crash Opera

from the album Born
- B-side: "Come Inside My Mind"; "Home Is Where the Head Is"
- Released: September 1994
- Length: 3:16
- Label: Ariola; BMG
- Songwriters: Peter Farnan; Ian Tilley
- Producer: Boom Crash Opera

Boom Crash Opera singles chronology
"This Isn't Love" (1993)	"Gimme" (1994)	"Tongue Tied" (1995)

"Gimme" is a song by Australian pop rock band Boom Crash Opera. The song was released in September 1994 as the lead single from their fourth studio album, Born (1995), and reached number 14 on the Australian Singles Chart, becoming the band's fourth and final top-20 hit in Australia.

== Track listing ==
Australian CD and cassette single

1. "Gimme (Gimme Gimme Gimme Gimme What I Want)"
2. "Come Inside My Mind"
3. "Home Is Where the Head Is"
4. "Gimme" (20% More mix)

== Charts ==
Chart (1994)	Peak position
Australia (ARIA)	14
