= Dancing in the Storm (song) =

- Maxi single cover

Single by Boom Crash Opera

from the album These Here Are Crazy Times
- Released: 12 March 1990
- Studio: Metropolis Audio, Melbourne Australia
- Genre: Pop rock
- Length: 4:12
- Label: WEA
- Songwriters: Peter Farnan, Richard Pleasance
- Producer: Richard Pleasance

Boom Crash Opera singles chronology
"The Best Thing" (1989)	"Dancing in the Storm" (1990)	"Talk About It" (1990)

"Dancing in the Storm" is a song by Australian band, Boom Crash Opera. The song was released in March 1990 as the fourth single from their second studio album, These Here Are Crazy Times! (1989). It was also covered by the Australian Country band The Sunny Cowgirls on their "My Old Man" album (2014)

== Legacy ==
In January 2018, as part of Triple M's "Ozzest 100", the 'most Australian' songs of all time, "Dancing in the Storm" was ranked number 51.

The song has been described as "ever-present" in Australian sports broadcasts, with the Australian Football League licensing the song for a number of years. Farnan later said, "I'm actually quite proud to play songs that are out there in our popular culture. Having that big communal moment at a festival playing a song like "Dancing in the Storm", there is nothing like it."

== Track listing ==
1. "Dancing in the Storm" - 4:12
2. "Mountain of Strength" - 4:09
3. "Get Out of the House!" (Live) - 3:21
4. "End Up Where I Started" (Live) - 3:34
5. "Hands Up in the Air" (Live) - 5:26
- Live tracks recorded at MCM Network.

== Charts ==
Chart (1990)	Peak position
Australia (ARIA)	21
