= This Isn't Love =

1993 single by Boom Crash Opera

Single by Boom Crash Opera

from the album Fabulous Beast
- B-side: "Holy Water"; "Bettadaze" (acoustic); "Don't Let On"; "Mindless"
- Released: 17 May 1993
- Length: 3:32
- Label: EastWest
- Songwriter: Dale Ryder
- Producer: Don Gehman

Boom Crash Opera singles chronology
"In the Morning" (1993)	"This Isn't Love" (1993)	"Gimme" (1994)

"This Isn't Love" is a song by Australian pop rock band Boom Crash Opera. It was released in May 1993 as the third and final single from their third studio album, Fabulous Beast (1993), and was promoted as an extended play (EP). The single charted at number 78 on the Australian ARIA Singles Chart.

== Track listing ==
Australian CD and cassette EP

1. "This Isn't Love"
2. "Holy Water"
3. "Bettadaze" (acoustic)
4. "Don't Let On"
5. "Mindless"

== Charts ==
Chart (1993)	Peak position
Australia (ARIA)	78
