= In the Morning (Boom Crash Opera song) =

1993 single by Boom Crash Opera

Single by Boom Crash Opera

from the album Fabulous Beast
- B-side: "The Big End of Little Town"; "Dreaming Away"
- Released: February 1993
- Length: 4:01
- Label: EastWest
- Songwriters: Peter Fernan, Greg O'Connor
- Producer: Peter Fernan

Boom Crash Opera singles chronology
"Bettadaze" (1992)	"In the Morning" (1993)	"This Isn't Love" (1993)

"In the Morning" is a song by Australian pop rock band Boom Crash Opera. The song was released in February 1993 as the second single from their third studio album, Fabulous Beast (1993), and peaked at number 36 on the Australian Singles Chart.

== Track listing ==
Australian CD single

1. "In the Morning"
2. "The Big End of Little Town"
3. "Dreaming Away"

== Charts ==
Chart (1993)	Peak position
Australia (ARIA)	36
