= Peter Farnan =

Australian composer, sound designer, musical director and guitarist

- Origin: Australia
- Genres: Rock, pop, alternative
- Occupation(s): Composer, musical director, songwriter, guitarist
- Website: peskybones.com

Peter Farnan is a composer, sound designer, musical director and guitarist from Melbourne, Australia. He is one of the founding members of the band Boom Crash Opera and the 1980s pop rock band Serious Young Insects. He currently produces music under the moniker 'Pesky Bones'. Peter has collaborated with artists including Paul Kelly, Megan Washington, Rebecca Barnard, Charles Jenkins and Tim Rogers.

== Theatre and film credits ==
- Melbourne Theatre Company – Scoring for Rockabye, Moonlight and Magnolias, All My Sons, The Clean House, Ray’s Tempest, Take Me Out, Three Days Of Rain, Cheech, Boy Gets Girl and Hitchcock Blonde (the latter two receiving nominations for Green Room Awards).
- Malthouse Theatre – Woyzeck (sound designer/ musical director/ additional composition), Tartuffe (composer/sound designer) and Sleeping Beauty (musical director), for which he received a nomination for a Helpmann Award.
- The Boy Castaways
- The Sapphires – musical director and occasional performer
