= The Best Thing (Boom Crash Opera song) =

1989 single by Boom Crash Opera

- 7" single cover

Single by Boom Crash Opera

from the album These Here Are Crazy Times
- Released: 27 November 1989
- Studio: Metropolis Audio, Melbourne Australia
- Genre: Rock; pop
- Length: 4:13
- Label: WEA
- Songwriter: Richard Pleasance
- Producer: Pete Smith

Boom Crash Opera singles chronology
| "Get Out of the House!" (1988) | "The Best Thing" (1989) | "Dancing in the Storm" (1990) |

"The Best Thing" is a song by Australian band Boom Crash Opera. It was released on 27 November 1989 as the third single from their second studio album, These Here Are Crazy Times! (1989). The song was featured in the 1991 film Don't Tell Mom the Babysitter's Dead and was included on its soundtrack album.

== Track listing ==
- 7" single
1. "The Best Thing" – 4:13
2. "Flying a Kite in the Rain" – 3:03
3. "Safer in Cages" – 4:29

== Charts ==
| Chart (1989–90) | Peak position |
|---|---|
| Australia (ARIA) | 67 |

== Listen!! mix ==
"The Best Thing (Listen!! mix)"

Single by Boom Crash Opera

from the album Look! Listen!!
- Released: 10 December 1990
- Length: 4:40
- Label: WEA
- Songwriter: Richard Pleasance

Boom Crash Opera singles chronology
| "Talk About It" (1990) | "The Best Thing (Listen!! mix)" (1990) | "Bettadaze" (1992) |

On 10 December 1990, Boom Crash Opera released "The Best Thing (Listen!! mix)" as the first and only single from the band's remix album, Look! Listen!! (1990). It peaked at number 112 on the ARIA Singles Chart in February 1991.

=== Track listing ===
- 12" single
1. "The Best Thing" (Listen!! mix) – 7:27
2. "The Best Thing" (Listen!! 7" edit) – 4:40
3. "The Best Thing" (Smashin' Dub) – 5:36

=== Charts ===
| Chart (1991) | Peak position |
|---|---|
| Australia (ARIA) | 112 |

== Hook n Sling version ==
"The Best Thing (2008)"

Single by Hook n Sling
- Released: 21 July 2008
- Genre: Electro house
- Length: 4:02 (radio edit); 7:30 (club edit)
- Label: Hussle Recordings

In 2008, "The Best Thing" was remixed by Australian DJ and producer Hook n Sling, and released under the title "The Best Thing (2008)", through Hussle Recordings. The vocals were re-recorded by Boom Crash Opera singer Dale Ryder for the release. "The Best Thing (2008)" reached number 27 on the ARIA Singles Chart, and spent eight weeks at number one on the ARIA Club Tracks Chart.

=== Track listings ===
- Digital release
1. "The Best Thing (2008)" (radio edit) – 4:02
2. "The Best Thing (2008)" (club edit) – 7:30
3. "The Best Thing (2008)" (Tonite Only remix) – 7:00
4. "The Best Thing (2008)" (TV Rock remix) – 7:09
5. "The Best Thing (2008)" (Noel Sinner remix) – 5:42
- CD single
1. "The Best Thing (2008)" (radio edit)
2. "The Best Thing (2008)" (club edit)
3. "The Best Thing (2008)" (TV Rock remix)

=== Charts ===
==== Weekly charts ====
| Chart (2008) | Peak position |
|---|---|
| Australia (ARIA) | 27 |
| Australia Club Tracks (ARIA) | 1 |
| Australia Dance (ARIA) | 6 |
| Australian Artists (ARIA) | 6 |

==== Year-end charts ====
| Chart (2008) | Position |
|---|---|
| Australia Club Tracks (ARIA) | 3 |
| Australia Dance (ARIA) | 26 |
| Australian Artists (ARIA) | 44 |

=== Release history ===
| Region | Date | Format(s) | Label | Ref. |
|---|---|---|---|---|
| Australia | 21 July 2008 | Digital download | Hussle Recordings | |
| Australia | 9 August 2008 | Digital download | Hussle Recordings | |
| Australia | 18 August 2008 | CD single | Hussle Recordings | |
