= Bettadaze =

1992 single by Boom Crash Opera

Single by Boom Crash Opera

from the album Fabulous Beast
- B-side: "The Last Place on Earth"; "L.A. 4am"
- Released: 12 October 1992
- Length: 3:51
- Label: EastWest
- Songwriters: Peter Farnan, Greg O'Connor
- Producer: Keith Forsey

Boom Crash Opera singles chronology
"The Best Thing (Listen mix)" (1990)	"Bettadaze" (1992)	"In the Morning" (1993)

"Bettadaze" is a song by Australian pop rock band Boom Crash Opera. It was released in October 1992 as the lead single from their third studio album, Fabulous Beast (1993), and peaked at number 43 on the Australian Singles Chart.

== Track listing ==
Australian CD and cassette single

1. "Bettadaze" – 3:51
2. "The Last Place on Earth" – 3:21
3. "L.A. 4am" – 2:42

== Charts ==
Chart (1992)	Peak position
Australia (ARIA)	43
