= Hands Up in the Air =

"Hands Up In The Air"

Single by Boom Crash Opera

from the album Boom Crash Opera
- Released: 1986
- Studio: Platinum Studios, Melbourne, Sing Sing Studios
- Genre: Rock
- Length: 3:47
- Label: WEA Records
- Songwriters: Peter Farnan, Richard Pleasance, Dale Ryder
- Producer: Steve Brown

Boom Crash Opera singles chronology
"Great Wall" (1986)	"Hands Up In The Air" (1986)	"City Flat" (1987)

"Hands Up in the Air" is a song by Australian rock band Boom Crash Opera. It was released in 1986 as the second single from their self-titled studio album.

The song reached number 16 in Australia.

== Background ==
Co-author Farnan said the song was inspired by the Smiths' "How Soon is Now?" and written about Melbourne's Port Phillip Bay.

== Reception ==
Jane Gazzo said the song, "continues the tradition of tight, funky rock and anthemic song chants from the chorus."

== Track listing ==
7" single (0.258620)

1. Hands Up in the Air (Extended Remix) (Peter Farnan; Richard Pleasance, Dale Ryder) – 4:47
2. Leave (Dale Ryder, Greg O'Connor, Peter Maslen) – 3:44
3. Hands Up in the Air (Peter Farnan; Richard Pleasance) – 3:47

== Personnel ==
- Peter Maslen – drums, vocals
- Greg O'Connor – keyboards
- Dale Ryder – lead vocals
- Richard Pleasance – guitar, bass, vocals
- Peter Farnan – guitar, vocals

== Charts ==
=== Weekly charts ===
Chart (1986)	Peak position
Australia (Kent Music Report)	16
