= Richard Pleasance =

Australian musician

- Born: Richard Arnold Pleasance; Park Orchards, Victoria, Australia
- Genre: Rock
- Occupations: Musician; songwriter; producer
- Instruments: Guitar; bass guitar; vocals
- Years active: 1980–present
- Labels: WEA; BMG; Sony
- Formerly of: Boom Crash Opera

Richard Arnold Pleasance is an Australian rock musician and producer. He was a founding member of Boom Crash Opera on guitar, bass guitar, vocals and as a songwriter in 1985; they released three albums before Pleasance left in 1992. Their hit Australian Recording Industry Association (ARIA) singles, "Great Wall" (No. 5, 1986) and "Onion Skin" (No. 11, 1989) were co-written by Pleasance, who also co-produced their second album, These Here Are Crazy Times (No. 10, 1989). His debut solo release, Galleon received four nominations at the ARIA Music Awards for 1992. Pleasance composed the theme music for Australian television series SeaChange (1998–2001), for 2006 feature film Kenny, and more recently he composed the theme music for the prison drama series Wentworth. Pleasance is married to Michelle, and, since May 2009, is living in Hepburn Springs, Victoria, where he has a recording studio.

== Early life ==
Pleasance was born in Park Orchards and attended Mitcham High School. His nickname at school was Polly. He was the founding guitarist for Melbourne-based band Government Drums in 1981 with Steve Bell, Michael Davis, Barbara Hogarth and Willy Zygier. After they disbanded in 1982, Pleasance joined Serious Young Insects in 1983 when founding bass guitarist, Michael Vallance left. Alongside Pleasance were Peter Farnan on guitar and vocals and Mark White on drums, but the group soon disbanded. Pleasance stated in a radio interview on 21st Sept 2021 (ABC Melbourne) that he was never a member of Serious Young Insects but would have liked to have been. Pleasance then formed Bang in 1983, which included Karen Ansel, Carol Hitchcock, Laurie McRae, Tim Rosewarne, Nick Seymour, Ren Walters, Oleh Witer and Sherine Abeyratne, and disbanded in 1984.

== 1985–2009: Boom Crash Opera ==
Pleasance teamed up again with Farnan in 1985 to form rock music group Boom Crash Opera with Dale Ryder on lead vocals, Peter Maslen on drums and Greg O'Connor on keyboards. The band signed to Warner Records Australia and in 1986 released their debut single "Great Wall" co-written by Ryder, Pleasance and O'Connor. The single reached No. 5 on the Australian Kent Music Report Singles Chart. Their self-titled debut album, Boom Crash Opera was released in 1987, and featured follow up singles "Hands Up in the Air", "City Flat" and "Her Charity" —all co-written by Pleasance.

In 1989, they released "Onion Skin" which peaked at No. 11 on the Australian Recording Industry Association (ARIA) Singles Chart in June. It was released ahead of their Top 10 album, These Here Are Crazy Times which was produced by Pete Smith and Pleasance, and mixed by Nick Launay. The album spent 40 weeks in the ARIA Albums Chart and achieved double platinum sales. "Onion Skin" was followed by Top 30 singles "Get Out of the House!" and "Dancing in the Storm".

Boom Crash Opera released Look! Listen!! in 1990, it featured remixed versions of songs from their first two albums plus two new songs and peaked into the Top 50. Soon after its release, Pleasance was diagnosed with tinnitus and while he took time off he was replaced on bass guitar by Mick Vallance. During his break from the band, Pleasance released his debut solo album, Galleon in 1991.

In 1991, the band released an Extended Play (EP), Dreams on Fire, with both Pleasance and Vallance on bass guitar. The EP reached Top 50 on the ARIA Singles Chart and featured the track "Holy Water". In 1992 they travelled to Los Angeles and began work on the next studio album. Soon after they began writing and recording Pleasance made his decision to leave the band. He was temporarily replaced by Dorian West and then Ian Tilley.

Boom Crash Opera recorded an acoustic album entitled Dancing in the Storm in February 2009 with Pleasance guesting on bass, guitar, mandolin, sitar and Oud; he also produced the recording as part of the Liberation Blue series which was released in May.

== 1991–present: solo years ==
Pleasance had solo success outside Boom Crash Opera, his 1991 album Galleon featured the singles "Sarah I Miss You" and "Don't Cry". The album's personnel included Paul Hester and Deborah Conway. Galleon was critically acclaimed and went on to earn four nominations at the ARIA Music Awards for 1992. Pleasance then toured the album, as a support act for Elvis Costello.

Also in 1991, Pleasance co-produced and performed on the highly successful debut album for Deborah Conway, String of Pearls and co-wrote, "King of Jordan", with Conway. Pleasance has also produced, arranged, played and written with other acts, Archie Roach, Paul Kelly, Suzanne Vega, James Reyne, Jon Stevens, Nick Barker, Seven Stories and Augie March.

In 1996, Pleasance formed Felt with fellow singer-songwriter Wendy Morrison on piano and they released the self-titled album, Felt, on Gotham and BMG Records. Pleasance supplied vocals, guitar, bass guitar and keyboard and produced the album.

Pleasance wrote and produced the theme for the popular Australian television series SeaChange (1998–2001). He started a band, Pleasantville, which included his wife, Michelle, which released their debut album Hill of Beans in 2004. He composed the theme music for 2006 feature film Kenny. As from May 2009, Pleasance was living in Hepburn Springs, Victoria where he has a recording studio.

In May 2018, Pleasance recorded the original motion picture soundtrack for the film Brothers' Nest.

In August 2021, Pleasance released "Crooked River", the lead single from his forthcoming third studio album of the same name.

== Discography ==
=== Studio albums ===
List of studio albums, with selected details and chart positions
Title	Album details	Peak chart positions
Title	Album details	AUS
Galleon	Release date: 1991; Label: East West / Warner Music Australia (903173999); Formats: CD, LP, cassette	59
Colourblind	Release date: 1995; Label: BMG Australia (7689640207); Formats: CD, cassette	—
Crooked River	Release date: September 2021; Label: Formats: CD, digital download	—

=== Soundtrack albums ===
List of soundtrack albums
Title	Details
Kenny (soundtrack)	Release date: 2006; Label: iNSYNC Music (INCD20062); Formats: CD, digital download
Wentworth (soundtrack)	Release date: April 2015; Label: Fremantle Media; Formats: Digital download
Brothers' Nest (soundtrack)	Release date: May 2018; Label: LilliPilli (B07C7KPLTX); Formats: Digital download
Wentworth Vol. 2 (soundtrack)	Release date: June 2019; Label: LilliPilli; Formats: Digital download

=== Singles ===
List of singles, with selected chart positions
Title	Year	Peak chart positions	Album
Title	Year	AUS	Album
"Sarah (I Miss You)"	1991	49	Galleon
"Don't Cry"	1991	69	Galleon
"Love Is All"	1994	—	Colourblind
"Colourblind"	1995	—	Colourblind
"Seachange" ((Theme from the TV Series) (featuring Wendy Morrison)	2019	—	
"Crooked River"	2021	—	Crooked River

== Engineer, producer or session musician ==
Pleasance has been an audio engineer, record producer and/or session musician.

- 1991 – String of Pearls – Deborah Conway
- 1991 – Electric Digger Dandy – James Reyne
- 1992 – 99.9F° – Suzanne Vega
- 1993 – Everything You Want (Nothing That You Need) – Seven Stories
- 1994 – Happy Man – Barker
- 1996 – Shop Front Window – The Jaynes
- 1998 – Waltz – Augie March
- 2000 – Sunset Studies – Augie March
- 2001 – Resonate – Jimmy Little
- 2002 – Cooinda – Kutcha Edwards
- 2002 – Sensual Being – Archie Roach
- 2003 – Won't You Come Around – Paul Kelly
- 2005 – All the Pretty Boys – Sophie Koh

== See also ==
- Boom Crash Opera discography

== Awards and nominations ==
=== APRA Awards ===
The APRA Awards are held in Australia and New Zealand by the Australasian Performing Right Association to recognise songwriting skills, sales and airplay performance by its members annually.

Year	Nominee / work	Award	Result	Ref.
2008	Emerald Falls	Best Music for a Mini-Series or Telemovie	Won	
2008	"Episode 14" from City Homicide	Best Music for a Television Series or Serial	Nominated	

=== ARIA Music Awards ===
The ARIA Music Awards is an annual awards ceremony that recognises excellence, innovation, and achievement across all genres of Australian music.

Year	Nominee / work	Award	Result	Ref.
1992	Galleon	Best Male Artist	Nominated	
1992	Galleon	Breakthrough Artist – Album	Nominated	
1992	"Sarah (I Miss You)"	Breakthrough Artist – Single	Nominated	
1992	Richard Pleasance	Producer of the Year	Nominated	
1992	Richard Pleasance and Ross Hipwell for Galleon	Best Cover Art	Nominated	
2001	The Very Best of SeaChange	Best Original Soundtrack	Nominated	
