= Get Out of the House! =

- Maxi single cover

Single by Boom Crash Opera

from the album These Here Are Crazy Times
- Released: 4 September 1989
- Studio: Metropolis Audio, Melbourne Australia
- Genre: Rock, pop
- Length: 3:26
- Label: WEA
- Songwriter(s): Peter Farnan, Peter Maslen, Dale Ryder, Richard Pleasance, Greg O'Connor
- Producer(s): Peter Smith, Richard Pleasance

Boom Crash Opera singles chronology
"Onion Skin" (1988)	"Get Out of the House!" (1989)	"The Best Thing" (1989)

"Get Out of the House!" is a song by Australian band, Boom Crash Opera. The song was released in September 1989 as the second single from their second studio album, These Here Are Crazy Times! (1989).

== Track listing ==
7"

1. "Get Out of the House" (Boom Crash Opera) - 3:16
2. "Thinking in Slow Motion" (Richard Pleasance) - 3:26

CD Maxi

1. "Get Out of the House" (Boom Crash Opera) - 3:16
2. "Onion Skin" (Extended Mix) - 5:05
3. "Thinking in Slow Motion" - 3:26
4. "Four Sunny Days Out of Seven" - 4:16

12 inch single

1. Get Out of the House (Extended Version) (Boom Crash Opera) - 5:39
2. Thinking in Slow Motion (Richard Pleasance) - 3:26
3. Four Sunny Days Out of Seven - 4:16

== Charts ==
Chart (1989)	Peak position
Australia (ARIA)	24
