= Great Wall (song) =

- Original 1986 cover

Single by Boom Crash Opera

from the album Boom Crash Opera
- Released: 1986
- Recorded: 1986
- Genre: Rock
- Length: 3:46; 4:59 (extended mix)
- Label: WEA Records
- Songwriter(s): Dale Ryder, Richard Pleasance, Greg O'Connor
- Producer(s): Steve Brown

Boom Crash Opera singles chronology
"Great Wall" (1986)	"Hands Up in the Air" (1986)

"Great Wall" is a song by Australian rock band Boom Crash Opera. It was the first single from their self-titled 1987 album, and reached number five on the Australian music charts. Great Wall's lyrics reference the New South Wales Hume Weir (Dam).

At the 1986 Countdown Australian Music Awards the song won Best Debut single.

== Reception ==
Jane Gazzo said, "Featuring a 'hey hey' catch cry coupled with bombastic beats and a chugging bassline, it was a superb single to release as a debut."

== Track listing ==
7" single (7.258695)

1. "Great Wall" (Dale Ryder) - 3:46
2. "Caught Between Two Towns" (Peter Farnan) - 3:23

== Charts ==
=== Weekly charts ===
Chart (1986)	Peak position
Australia (Kent Music Report)	5

=== Year-end charts ===
Chart (1986)	Peak position
Australia (Kent Music Report)	39

== Personnel ==
- Drums – Peter Maslen
- Engineer – Chris Corr
- Guitar – Peter Farnan
- Guitar, Bass – Richard Pleasance
- Keyboards – Greg O'Connor
- Mastered By – Paul Ibbotson
- Vocals – Dale Ryder
