= Onion Skin (song) =

1989 single by Boom Crash Opera

- 7 inch single cover

Single by Boom Crash Opera

from the album These Here Are Crazy Times
- Released: 5 June 1989
- Length: 3:26
- Label: WEA
- Songwriter(s): Peter Farnan
- Producer(s): Peter Smith

Boom Crash Opera singles chronology
"Love Me to Death" (1988)	"Onion Skin" (1989)	"Get Out of the House!" (1989)

"Onion Skin" is a song by Australian band Boom Crash Opera. The song was released in June 1989 as the lead single from their second studio album, These Here Are Crazy Times! (1989), and reached number 11 on the Australian ARIA Singles Chart. The following year, the song was released in the United States and reached number eight on the Billboard Modern Rock Tracks chart that July.

== Recording ==
Pete Smith produced, but the band were dissatisfied with his mixing of the song. Farnan said, "I remember he was stuck mixing "Onion Skin". He kept trying and he wasn't getting anywhere. Someone suggested that Nick Launay should have a crack."

== Track listings ==
7 inch single

1. "Onion Skin" (Peter Farnan) – 3:26
2. "Rocks Are in My Head" (Peter Farnan, Peter Maslen, Richard Pleasance, Dale Ryder) – 3:42

12 inch single

1. Onion Skin (extended mix) (Peter Farnan) – 5:05
2. These Here Are Crazy Times (Boom Crash Opera) – 4:08
3. Rocks Are in My Head (Peter Farnan, Peter Maslen, Richard Pleasance, Dale Ryder) – 3:42

== Charts ==
=== Weekly charts ===
Chart (1989–1990)	Peak position
Australia (ARIA)	11
US Modern Rock Tracks (Billboard)	8

=== Year-end charts ===
Chart (1989)	Position
Australia (ARIA)	78
