= Boom Crash Opera =

Australian pop rock band

- Boom Crash Opera performing in Rockhampton, Queensland, in August 2026

Background information
- Origin: Melbourne, Victoria, Australia
- Genres: Pop rock, pub rock
- Years active: 1985–present
- Labels: WEA, East West Records, BMG, Sony BMG, Mushroom Music
- Members: Dale Ryder; Peter Farnan; Peter Maslen; John Favaro
- Past members: Richard Pleasance; Ian Tilley; Greg O'Connor; Dorian West; Mick Vallance; Andrew De Silva

Boom Crash Opera are an Australian pop rock band formed in late 1984. Initially based around the songwriting partnership of Richard Pleasance and Peter Farnan, the band was later joined by Dale Ryder (vocals), Peter 'Maz' Maslen (drums) and Greg O’Connor (keyboards). Pleasance developed tinnitus from constant exposure to loud live music and left in 1992 to pursue a solo career as an artist and producer. O’Connor departed in 1994.

Current line-up includes Dale Ryder (vocals), Peter 'Maz' Maslen (drums), Peter Farnan (guitar) and John Favaro (bass).

Their highest-charting albums are Boom Crash Opera, These Here Are Crazy Times! and Fabulous Beast. Their top 20 singles are "Great Wall", "Hands up in the Air" (both 1986), "Onion Skin" (1989) and "Gimme" (1994). In the United States "Onion Skin" reached No. 8 on the Billboard component chart Modern Rock Tracks. Australian musicologist Ian McFarlane noted that the group had a "strong visual image and the uncanny ability of its principal songwriters to pen catchy, commercial songs ensured a string of successful releases".

== Career ==
=== 1985–1986: Formation and early years ===
Boom Crash Opera were formed in late 1984 in Melbourne with a line up of Peter Farnan (ex–Urtle Urtle Urtle, Serious Young Insects) on guitar, keyboards and backing vocals; Peter 'Maz' Maslen (ex–One Hand Clapping) on drums, percussion and backing vocals; Greg O'Connor; Richard Pleasance (ex–Government Drum, Bang, One Hand Clapping) on bass guitar, guitar and backing vocals; and Dale Ryder on lead vocals.

Serious Young Insects had formed in 1980 with Peter Farnan on vocals and guitar, Michael Vallance on vocals and bass guitar and Mark White on vocals and drums. Australian musicologist Ian McFarlane described Serious Young Insects as a "quirky, three-piece Melbourne new wave band". They issued an album, Housebreaking (May 1982), and three singles. Lisa Perry of The Canberra Times praised the album: "several times I had to check the cover to see if there were not also some session musos or others contributing to the sounds I was hearing. For a three-piece combo, these lads sure make a good sound". Pleasance, a classically trained guitarist, was a fan and briefly joined the group before it broke up in the following year.

In September 1985 three Australian journalists, Paul Gardiner, Jane Gardiner and Toby Creswell, listed twelve groups as The Next Big Thing, with Boom Crash Opera described as "[o]ne name that stands out ... a Melbourne band that has every A-and-R man and his dog salivating. There are some other bands which, if not attracting the same sort of frenetic endorsement, are nevertheless on the minds of the scouts".

Farnan described his bandmates, other than Pleasance, to The Canberra Times' Pollyanna Sutton in May 1986 "[t]he others are sort of from nowhere ... Drummer Peter "Maz" Maslen, has and still does a lot of recording sessions, in early 1984 he met Richard in this avante-garde band called One Hand Clapping, then played together with Venetta Fields in the time just before Boom Crash Opera. Dale came out of the blue, he has done some singing with bands but never had a serious crack at it until now."

=== 1987–1992: From "Great Wall" to Pleasance leaving ===
Boom Crash Opera were signed to WEA and in April 1986 they released their debut single "Great Wall", which was produced by Steve Brown. "Great Wall" reached No. 5 on the Australian Kent Music Report Singles Chart in the next month. The track was written by Ryder, Pleasance and O'Connor. According to Farnan: "Richard wrote the music and Dale helped him finish the words, but they did not know what they wanted to write about so I suggested they write about the Hume Weir. Like, it isn't specifically about the Hume Weir but they used the idea about a dam wall that dams up fear and prejudice, it is also the wall that shores up relationship". McFarlane described it as an "exuberant" single, which "established the hallmarks of [their] sound: the tight, funky rock of the music, the boom-like crack of the drums and the work song chant of the vocals". The group toured the Australian pub rock circuit promoting the single.

Their second single, "Hands up in the Air", followed in August, which peaked at No. 16. It was written by Pleasance, Ryder and Farnan; and was produced by Brown. A music video was directed by Kimble Rendall (ex–XL Capris, Hoodoo Gurus). At the ARIA Music Awards of 1987 the group were nominated for three awards: Highest Selling Single for "Great Wall", Best New Talent for both singles, and Best Video for "Hands up in the Air". At the Countdown Music and Video Awards of 1986, held in July 1987, "Great Wall" won Best Debut Single. A self-titled debut album, followed in September 1987, which was recorded in London and produced by Alex Sadkin (Grace Jones, Duran Duran, James Brown, Simply Red, Talking Heads). Both "Great Wall" and "Hands up in the Air" were remixed for their album versions. After recording the album Sadkin travelled to the Bahamas to work, where he died in a car accident in July.

Boom Crash Opera reached No. 19 on the Kent Music Report Albums Chart, and was certified as a gold album. Stuart Coupe of The Sydney Morning Herald reported there were "impressive notices" for the album and that the group had "been tipped for mega-stardom". Follow-up singles were "City Flat" (June 1987), "Her Charity" (September) and "Love Me to Death" (March 1988), which were "minor hits". Coupe felt that "City Flat" was "[o]ne of the more outstanding tracks" and it "appears to paint a fairly bleak picture of [their] home town". AllMusic's Kevin Hayes compared their sound to Tears for Fears, Icehouse and INXS. He felt it was an "impressive debut. Pete Maslen's drumming keeps pulse. A pensive guitar leads into the most brilliant of bridges and a lilting melody underpinned by Richard Pleasance's strong bassline". However "Hands up in the Air" was "musically strong but weak in its lyrics ... It's a wonder it made the album, let alone became a single ... [it has a] teeny naïveté".

In August 1989 they released a single, "Onion Skin", ahead of their second album These Here Are Crazy Times (October), which was produced by Jimmy Iovine, Pete Smith and Pleasance, and mixed by Nick Launay. The album reached No. 10 on the ARIA Albums Chart, it spent 40 weeks in the Top 50, and achieved a double platinum certificate. Allmusic's Jonathan Lewis opined that "[it was] slick, commercial pop. As in previous outings, lead singer Dale Ryder's effortless (although somewhat limited) vocal delivery and Richard Pleasance's skillful guitar work helped disguise the fact that underneath the catchy melodies and slick production, there wasn't a lot of substance to [their] music". "Onion Skin" peaked at No. 11 on the ARIA Singles Chart and was followed by four more singles, "Get Out of the House!" (September), "The Best Thing" (December), "Dancing in the Storm" (April 1990) and "Talk About It" (July). "Dancing in the Storm" also featured in the 1990 Australian comedy film The Big Steal.

In 1990 they released a compilation album, Look! Listen!!, which featured remixed versions of songs from their first two albums plus two new songs. At the end of that year Pleasance was diagnosed with tinnitus and was unable to perform with the group. He was temporarily replaced on bass guitar by former bandmate from Serious Young Insects, Vallance. During his break from the band, in 1991, Pleasance released his debut solo album, Galleon. Late that year Boom Crash Opera released a four-track extended play, Dreams on Fire, with both Pleasance and Vallance aboard. The EP was produced by Keith Forsey and the band; it appeared on the ARIA Singles Chart Top 50, and featured the track, "Holy Water". In 1992 they travelled to Los Angeles and began work on a follow-up album, Fabulous Beast. However, during early writing sessions, Pleasance left the band and returned to Australia; he was temporarily replaced by Dorian West on bass guitar (ex-Wildland). It was during the recording of Fabulous Beast that the band found themselves impacted by the 1992 Los Angeles riots. The song "The Last Place on Earth", that appears on the album was inspired and written as a result of this experience. The final vocal line of Ryder's in the song which is "just look out the window", has his voice actually breaking due to being so emotionally moved by the experience.

=== 1993–1997:Fabulous Beast to Gizmo Mantra ===
After Boom Crash Opera returned from L.A. Ian Tilley joined on bass guitar, keyboards and backing vocals, as the permanent replacement for Pleasance following the departure of Dorian West. In late 1992 they released a single, "Bettadaze". The track was written by Farnan and O'Connor and early in 1993 the Liberal Party wanted to use it for their federal election campaign theme but were refused permission. "Bettadaze" was followed in March by the related album, Fabulous Beast, which was produced by Forsey, Don Gehman, and the group. It peaked at No. 15, while it provided two further singles "In the Morning" and "This Isn't Love". The Canberra Times' Bevan Hannan noted the album's "overall strength" was "especially evident when you compare it to" their previous work. It had an "acoustic flavour" which Hannan found "striking" with "In the Morning" as the "best example" of the style.

The group toured Australia to promote the album and its singles and were "road testing songs". In October they headlined the World's Biggest Barbie in Canberra with Weddings Parties Anything as their support act. Farnan described how they had been "flogging our wares" to Nicole Leedham of The Canberra Times. He noted that "Rock and Roll bands are strange, creative beasts ... We indulge ourselves now and again and take a radical left-hand turn and get off the track". He remembered playing alongside Weddings Parties Anything "[t]hey started at about the same time as us and we were sharing bits of equipment while we were both getting established". Mark Wallace, piano accordionist of the latter group, agreed that the two bands had an affinity but "[we] haven't seen them for a couple of years".

The four remaining members: Farnan, Maslen, Ryder, and Tilley, continued the band and in October 1994 they issued a single, "Gimme", on their newly signed label, BMG. It reached No. 14 and was followed by their next single, "Tongue Tied", which appeared in the top 30 in February 1995. The parent album, Born was released in March and was produced by Farnan and Neil Wiles, and engineered by Kalju Tonuma. It was issued in a double CD package with space reserved for a second disc, Born Again, which was due to be released in April. McFarlane declared the album was a "tougher affair which found the band embracing hi-tech pop, techno-metal and all manner of sound effects and cyberpunk studio trickery". Although "Gimme" had received generous radio airplay and the album had reached the top 40, BMG scrapped the release of the second part, Born Again.

In November 1997 Boom Crash Opera released a studio album, Gizmo Mantra, which was produced by Daniel Denholm, Kalju Tonuma and the group. Pulling back from the electronic sounding previous album, Gizmo Mantra was a return to the melodic rock sounds of earlier work. It included the singles, "All" and "Dreaming up a Fire" – the latter had been written by Farnan and Pleasance at the time of the Dreams on Fire sessions. However Gizmo Mantra failed to reach the top 50. McFarlane noted that "after 1997 [the band] disappeared from view" but during their main career they had a "strong visual image and the uncanny ability of its principal songwriters to pen catchy, commercial songs ensured a string of successful releases".

=== 1998–2015: Later works ===
Boom Crash Opera continued performing and releasing material. In August 1998 BMG issued a compilation album, The Best Things – Greatest Hits, which featured their singles from previous albums plus two tracks, "Soundtrack" and "Radio", from their unreleased album, Born Again.

In 2002 Robert Doyle the Opposition Leader of Victoria used "Dancing in the Storm" as his theme during the Liberal Party's state election campaign launch in November. The band were not asked their permission, and would have refused if asked according to Pleasance who had co-written the track with Farnan. He said the pair would consult their lawyers "about possible copyright action". Pleasance opined that the group would not allow any political party to use their music, "It's just not what the songs are about". The Liberal Party's campaign failed: Steve Bracks and his Australian Labor Party won the election.

In 2008 Hook N Sling released a dance re-make of the 1989 single, "The Best Thing", featuring on Ministry of Sound Sessions 5. On 5 April 2009 the group performed at Alistair Knox Park, Eltham for A Day of Healing – a benefit concert to support the Country Fire Authority and affected communities following the Black Saturday bush fires. During those bush fires the group had been in Pleasance's studio in Hepburn Springs, recording an acoustic disc for Dancing in the Storm.

On 1 May 2009 Boom Crash Opera released Dancing in the Storm as part of the Liberation Blue series. It comprises a compilation CD with acoustic re-workings of their songs and a live DVD recorded during the Fabulous Beast Tour. The acoustic disc had the line up of Ryder on vocals, Farnan on acoustic guitar, Maslen on drums, Pleasance on acoustic bass guitar, acoustic guitar, mandolin, sitar and Oud, and Tilley on bass guitar. Pleasance guested with the band for the first time since 1992. The live DVD was from a performance for MTV Australia's Unplugged, at Melbourne's Channel Nine studios, back in June 1993. Both discs were engineered and produced by Pleasance. The band promoted Dancing in the Storm with a national tour.

The band's song "Dancing in the Storm" was used in 2010 for the Mt Franklin Water TV ad. On 12 February 2012 the group performed at the St Kilda Festival. Three releases were issued on 18 October 2013 by Liberation Records; The Best Things – Greatest Hits, and album of rare tracks called The Lost Things and a 4-CD set called Rattle it Out.

=== 2016–present: Band changes ===
In March 2016, Drummer Peter 'Maz' Maslen advised media that original member and lead singer Dale Ryder had resigned from the band, replaced by Andrew De Silva. The band toured across Australia throughout 2016 and January 2017. Ryder rejoined in 2019.

In March 2025, the band released their first new single in 28 Years "Latest Hustle".

== Members ==
=== Current members ===
- Peter Farnan – guitars, bass, keyboards, piano, backing vocals (1985–present)
- Peter "Maz" Maslen – drums, percussion, backing vocals (1985–present)
- John Favaro – bass, backing vocals (2016–present)
- Dale Ryder – lead vocals, harmonica, acoustic guitar (1985–2016, 2019–present)

=== Former members ===
- Richard Pleasance – bass, guitars, backing vocals (1985–1992, guest 2009)
- Greg "Spock" O'Connor – guitars, keyboards, piano, backing vocals (1985–1994, guest 2009)
- Michael Vallance – bass (1991–1992)
- Dorian West – bass (1992)
- Ian Tilley – bass, keyboards, piano, backing vocals (1992–2016)
- Andrew De Silva – lead vocals (2016–2018)

== Careers outside the band ==
After the 1993 tour promoting Fabulous Beast, Boom Crash Opera took a break. Farnan had produced the debut album, This Is the Sharp (September 1993), for The Sharp, a three piece pop-rock band from Collingwood. He has also produced and written with artists such as Rachael Kane, and Cade.

Maslen has performed live and/or as a recording drummer for many Australian artists including: Natalie Imbruglia, Delta Goodrem, Mark Seymour and The Undertow, Men at Work, The Seekers, Tripod, Shellie Morris, Tex Perkins, Felicity Urquhart, Models, Belinda Emmett, Vika and Linda, Archie Roach, Ollie Olsen, Bodyrockers, Icehouse, Shannon Noll, Jimmy Barnes, Kylie Minogue, Diesel, Jimmy Little, Troy Cassar-Daley, Colin Hay, Olivia Newton-John, Ian Moss, James Reyne and Kate Ceberano.

Pleasance's 1991 solo album, Galleon, included contributions from Paul Hester and Deborah Conway. It was critically acclaimed and received five nominations at the ARIA Music Awards of 1992. Pleasance then promoted the album, as a support act on Elvis Costello's tour of Australia. Pleasance co-produced and performed on the debut album by Deborah Conway, String of Pearls. In 1995 Pleasance released his second solo album, Colourblind. In 1998 Pleasance wrote and produced the theme for the popular Australian TV series, SeaChange.

== Discography ==
=== Studio albums ===
- Boom Crash Opera (1987)
- These Here Are Crazy Times! (1989)
- Fabulous Beast (1993)
- Born (1995)
- Gizmo Mantra (1997)
- Dancing in the Storm (2009)

== Awards and nominations ==
=== ARIA Music Awards ===
The ARIA Music Awards is an annual awards ceremony that recognises excellence, innovation, and achievement across all genres of Australian music. They commenced in 1987.

Year	Award	For	Result
1987	Best New Talent	"Great Wall/Hands Up in the Air"	Nominated
1987	Best Video	"Hands Up in the Air" (Kimble Rendall)	Nominated
1987	Highest Selling Single	"Great Wall"	Nominated
1990	Best Video	"Onion Skin"	Nominated
1990	Best Cover Art	These Here Are Crazy Times	Nominated
1990	Best Group	These Here Are Crazy Times	Nominated
1991	Best Group	"Look! Listen!!	Nominated
1992	Best Video	"Holy Water" (Paul Elliott)	Nominated
1993	Best Video	"Bettadaze" (Paul Elliott)	Nominated

=== Countdown Australian Music Awards ===
Countdown was an Australian pop music TV series on national broadcaster ABC-TV from 1974 to 1987, it presented music awards from 1979 to 1987, initially in conjunction with magazine TV Week. The TV Week / Countdown Awards were a combination of popular-voted and peer-voted awards.

Year	Nominee / work	Award	Result
1986	"Great Wall"	Best Debut Single	Won
1986	themselves	Best Debut Act	Nominated
