= Hoodoo Gurus discography =

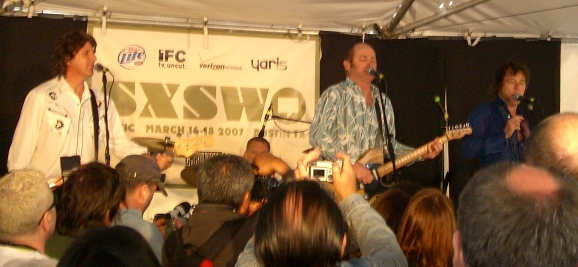
- Hoodoo Gurus at 2007 SXSW
- Studio albums: 10
- Extended plays: 2
- Live albums: 1
- Compilation albums: 6
- Singles: 37
- Video albums: 3

Australian rock group Hoodoo Gurus have released ten studio albums, thirty-seven singles, two extended plays, six compilation albums and 3 video albums. Formed in January 1981, the band was originally known as Le Hoodoo Gurus for the release of their first single, "Leilani", in October 1982. As Hoodoo Gurus, the band signed with Big Time Records and premiered their debut album, Stoneage Romeos, in March 1984. Also issued in the United States through A&M Records, the record remained atop the Alternative/College Albums Chart for four consecutive weeks, with it also becoming one of the most played albums of that year on the college network. The group's subsequent albums, Mars Needs Guitars!, Blow Your Cool! and Magnum Cum Louder, all reached the Billboard 200.

On the Australian charts Hoodoo Gurus had top ten studio albums with Mars Needs Guitars!, Blow Your Cool!, Kinky and Crank, and four top twenty singles. Both Stoneage Romeos and Mars Needs Guitars! were listed in the 100 Best Australian Albums (2010). In 1992, the band released a compilation album, Electric Soup/Gorilla Biscuit, which won an ARIA Music Award for Best Cover Art, in 1993. The two-album set was certified double platinum for shipping 140,000 units. The band's seventh studio album, Blue Cave, was nominated for Best Pop Release at the 1996 ARIA Awards and charted within the top twenty in their native country. Hoodoo Gurus split in 1998 followed by the release of their live album, Bite the Bullet, later that year.

In November 2003 Hoodoo Gurus reformed and made their comeback with a new album, Mach Schau, in the following year. As of February 2005, their label, EMI, made expanded and remastered editions of all of their earlier studio albums available for purchase. At that time, Hoodoo Gurus released as well a two-DVD set, Tunnel Vision, which featured all their music videos, live material and a retrospective documentary, "Be My Guru". At that year's ARIA Awards ceremony, Tunnel Vision was nominated for Best Music DVD. In 2010, the group issued their ninth studio album, Purity of Essence, and celebrated their thirtieth anniversary by releasing a compilation album, Gold Watch: 20 Golden Greats, through Sony Music Entertainment in 2012.

== Albums ==
=== Studio albums ===
List of studio albums, with selected chart positions and certifications
Title	Album details	Peak chart positions							Certifications (sales thresholds)
Title	Album details	AUS	CAN	NZ	SWE	UK Indie	US	US College	Certifications (sales thresholds)
Stoneage Romeos	Released: March 1984; Label: Big Time (BT-7018); Format: LP	8 (Note: Stoneage Romeos peaked at number 29 upon its release in 1984. The 40th anniversary edition peaked at number eight on the ARIA Albums Chart in 2024.)	—	32	38	12	209	1	ARIA: Gold
Mars Needs Guitars!	Released: August 1985; Label: Big Time (BT-7053); Format: LP, MC	5	—	18	47	—	140	1	ARIA: 3× Platinum
Blow Your Cool!	Released: April 1987; Label: Big Time (BT-7069); Format: LP, MC, CD	2	73	16	32	—	120	1	ARIA: Gold
Magnum Cum Louder	Released: 28 May 1989; Label: RCA (PD 90362); Format: LP, CD	13	78	45	27	—	101	1	ARIA: Platinum
Kinky	Released: 9 April 1991; Label: RCA (VPCD 0839); Format: LP, MC, CD	8	—	28	—	—	172	2	ARIA: Platinum
Crank	Released: February 1994; Label: BMG (74321 18496-2); Format: CD	2	—	—	—	—	—	50	ARIA: Gold
Blue Cave	Released: May 1996; Label: Mushroom (TVD93455); Format: CD, 7× vinyl singles (Note: The entire album had a limited release (300 copies) as a set of seven 7" vinyl singles as In Blue Cave on Mushroom Records.)	18	—	—	—	—	—	—	ARIA: Gold
Mach Schau	Released: 15 March 2004; Label: Capitol (5773412); Format: CD	67	—	—	—	—	—	—	
Purity of Essence	Released: 12 March 2010; Label: Sony Music Entertainment (88697670902); Format: CD	16	—	—	—	—	—	—	
Chariot of the Gods	Released: 11 March 2022; Label: Big Time; Formats: CD, LP, DL	7	—	—	—	—	—	—	
"—" denotes a release that did not chart or was not issued in that region.

=== Live albums ===
List of live albums
Title	Album details
Bite the Bullet	Released: 3 July 1998; Label: Mushroom (MUSH33156.5); Format: CD
Silk Purse (with Melbourne Symphony Orchestra)	Released: 4 December 2026; Label: Big Time / Universal; Format: CD, LP, digital

=== Compilations ===
List of compilation albums, with selected chart positions and certifications
Title	Album details	Peak chart positions		Certifications (sales thresholds)
Title	Album details	AUS	NZ	Certifications (sales thresholds)
Electric Soup	Released: August 1992; Label: BMG (7432110741-2); Format: CD	3	—	ARIA: 3× Platinum
Gorilla Biscuit	Released: August 1992; Label: BMG (7432110742-2); Format: CD	99	—	
Electric Chair	Released: October 1997; Label: Mushroom (MUSH33066.2); Format: CD	33 (Note: Electric Chair and Armchair Gurus were released and charted as a 2CD set)	—	ARIA: Gold
Armchair Gurus	Released: October 1997; Label: Mushroom (MUSH33066.2); Format: CD	33	—	ARIA: Gold
Ampology	Released: 10 October 2000 (Note: The compilation was initially released in the UK and Europe, and not issued in Australia until 12 March 2001 by Shock Records.); Label: Shock (GURUS14); Format: 2× CD	76	39	
Gold Watch: 20 Golden Greats	Released: 16 March 2012; Label: Sony Music Entertainment (88691945912); Format: CD	15	—	
"—" denotes releases that did not chart or were not released in that territory.

== Extended plays ==
List of extended plays
Title	Details
Hoodoo Voodoo	Released: 27 March 1997 (Note: The Hoodoo Voodoo EP was also known as Down on Me due to a three track version of the single.); Label: Mushroom (D1527); Format: 12" EP, CD
Gravy Train	Released: 21 November 2014; Label: Hoodoo Gurus, Sony Music Australia (88875027262); Format: CD, LP, digital

== Singles ==
List of singles, with selected chart positions
Title	Year	Peak chart positions					Album
Title	Year	AUS	CAN	NZ	UK Indie	US Alt	Album
"Leilani" (Note: "Leilani" was released as a single under the name, Le Hoodoo Gurus, just before they dropped the 'Le' and continued as Hoodoo Gurus.)	1982	—	—	—	—	—	Stoneage Romeos
"Tojo"	1983	80	—	—	—	—	Stoneage Romeos
"My Girl"	1983	35	—	—	38	—	Stoneage Romeos
"I Want You Back"	1984	68	—	—	11	—	Stoneage Romeos
"Bittersweet"	1985	16	—	—	—	—	Mars Needs Guitars!
"Like Wow - Wipeout!"	1985	15	—	—	—	—	Mars Needs Guitars!
"Death Defying"	1986	43	—	—	—	—	Mars Needs Guitars!
"Poison Pen"	1986	76	—	—	—	—	Mars Needs Guitars!
"What's My Scene?"	1987	3	—	35	—	—	Blow Your Cool!
"Good Times"	1987	36	95	—	—	—	Blow Your Cool!
"In the Middle of the Land"	1987	79	—	—	—	—	Blow Your Cool!
"The Generation Gap"	1988	50	—	—	—	—	Non-album single
"Come Anytime"	1989	27	—	—	—	1	Magnum Cum Louder
"Axegrinder"	1989	58	—	—	—	—	Magnum Cum Louder
"Another World"	1989	98	—	—	—	—	Magnum Cum Louder
"Miss Freelove '69"	1991	19	—	—	—	3	Kinky
"1000 Miles Away"	1991	37	—	—	—	—	Kinky
"A Place in the Sun"	1991	89	—	—	—	—	Kinky
"Castles in the Air"	1991	113	—	—	—	—	Kinky
"The Right Time"	1993	41	—	—	—	—	Crank
"You Open My Eyes"	1994	43	—	—	—	—	Crank
"Less Than a Feeling"	1994	26	—	—	—	—	Crank
"Nobody"	1994	117	—	—	—	—	Crank
"Turn Up Your Radio" (with Masters Apprentices)	1995	—	—	—	—	—	Non-album single
"Big Deal"	1996	108	—	—	—	—	Blue Cave
"Waking Up Tired"	1996	60	—	—	—	—	Blue Cave
"If Only..."	1996	139	—	—	—	—	Blue Cave
"Down on Me"	1997	97	—	—	—	—	Blue Cave
"The Real Deal"	1997	157	—	—	—	—	Electric Chair
"That's My Team"	2003	—	—	—	—	—	Non-album single
"Nothing's Changing My Life" (Note: "Nothing's Changing My Life" was only released as a single in Australia.)	2004	113	—	—	—	—	Mach Schau
"When You Get to California" (Note: "When You Get to California" was only released as a single in the United States.)	2004	—	—	—	—	—	Mach Schau
"Crackin' Up"	2009	—	—	—	—	—	Purity of Essence
"I Hope You're Happy"	2010	—	—	—	—	—	Purity of Essence
"What's in It for Me?"	2010	—	—	—	—	—	Purity of Essence
"Use-By Date (Remixed Version)" (Note: The original version of "Use-By Date" was released as a digital bonus track on Purity of Essence (Deluxe Edition) by iTunes, in April 2010.)	2012	—	—	—	—	—	Gold Watch: 20 Golden Greats
"Answered Prayers"	2019	—	—	—	—	—	Chariot of the Gods
"Hung out to Dry"	2020	—	—	—	—	—	Non-album single
"Get out of Dodge"	2020	—	—	—	—	—	Chariot of the Gods
"World of Pain"	2021	—	—	—	—	—	Chariot of the Gods
"Carry On"	2021	—	—	—	—	—	Chariot of the Gods
"—" denotes releases that did not chart or were not released in that territory.

== Videography ==
List of video albums, with selected chart positions
Title	Details	Peak chart positions
Title	Details	AUS DVD
Electric Soup: The Complete Video Collection	Released: 1992; Label: Mushroom Records; Format: VHS; Collection of 19 music videos.	—N/a
More Electric Soup	Released: 1996; Label: Mushroom Records (TVD 93476); Format: VHS + CD; Compilation of 8 music videos on VHS, + Blue Cave	90
Tunnel Vision	Released: February 2005; Label: EMI (Australia) (544540-9); Format: 2× DVD	12
"—" denotes releases that did not chart or were not released in that territory.
