= Ampology =

Compilation album by Hoodoo Gurus
- Released: 10 October 2000
- Recorded: 1982–1997
- Genre: Rock
- Length: 142:44
- Label: Acadia/Evangeline Records (UK); Shock Records, EMI Music Australia/Capitol Records (Australia); Limburger Records (Brazil)
- Producer: Hoodoo Gurus

Hoodoo Gurus chronology
Bite the Bullet (1998)	Ampology (2000)	Mach Schau (2004)

Professional ratings
Review scores
Source	Rating
Allmusic	4.5/5 stars

Ampology is the fifth compilation album by Australian rock group Hoodoo Gurus. The album spans the group's career from their first single, "Leilani" in October 1982 through to "Real Deal" in 1997. The album peaked at number 76 on the ARIA charts.

== Track listing ==
All tracks are written by Dave Faulkner, except where noted

Disc one
No.	Title	Originally from	Length
1.	"Leilani" (Faulkner, James Baker, Roddy Radalj, Kimble Rendall)	Single, 1982; later released on Stoneage Romeos	4:55
2.	"Tojo"	Stoneage Romeos, 1984	3:21
3.	"My Girl"	Stoneage Romeos, 1984	2:39
4.	"Be My Guru" (Faulkner, Baker)	B-side to "My Girl" single	2:38
5.	"I Want You Back"	Stoneage Romeos, 1984	3:11
6.	"I Was A Kamikaze Pilot"	Stoneage Romeos, 1984	3:09
7.	"Bittersweet"	Mars Needs Guitars!, 1985	3:51
8.	"Like Wow - Wipeout!"	Mars Needs Guitars!, 1985	3:13
9.	"Death Defying"	Mars Needs Guitars!, 1985	3:25
10.	"Poison Pen"	Mars Needs Guitars!, 1985	4:11
11.	"In The Wild"	Mars Needs Guitars!, 1985	3:11
12.	"What's My Scene?"	Blow Your Cool!, 1987	3:48
13.	"Heart Of Darkness"	Blow Your Cool!, 1987	3:04
14.	"Good Times"	Blow Your Cool!, 1987	3:02
15.	"In the Middle of the Land"	Blow Your Cool!, 1987	4:34
16.	"The Generation Gap" (Charlie Craig, Betty Craig, Jim Hayner)	Non-album single, 1988	3:41
17.	"Come Anytime"	Magnum Cum Louder, 1989	3:19
18.	"Cajun Country"	B-side to "Come Anytime" single	4:05
19.	"Axegrinder" (Faulkner, Brad Shepherd, Richard Grossman, Mark Kingsmill)	Magnum Cum Louder, 1989	3:26
20.	"Another World"	Magnum Cum Louder, 1989	3:16

Disc two
No.	Title	Album	Length
1.	"Miss Freelove '69"	Kinky, 1991	4:13
2.	"Stomp the Tumbarumba" (Johnny Devlin, Joy Inman)	B-side to "Miss Freelove '69" single	3:03
3.	"1000 Miles Away"	Kinky, 1991	4:33
4.	"I Think You Know"	B-side to "1000 Miles Away" single	3:33
5.	"A Place in the Sun"	Kinky, 1991	3:44
6.	"Castles in the Air"	Kinky, 1991	4:07
7.	"The Right Time"	Crank, 1994	3:56
8.	"You Open My Eyes" (Shepherd)	Crank, 1994	3:18
9.	"Less Than A Feeling"	Crank, 1994	3:37
10.	"Nobody"	Crank, 1994	4:24
11.	"Judgement Day" (Faulkner, Shepherd)	Crank, 1994	3:12
12.	"Big Deal" (Faulkner, Shepherd)	Blue Cave, 1996	3:21
13.	"Waking Up Tired" (Faulkner, Shepherd)	Blue Cave, 1996	2:54
14.	"Quicksand"	B-side to "Waking Up Tired" single	3:33
15.	"If Only..."	Blue Cave, 1996	3:44
16.	"Night Must Fall"	Blue Cave, 1996	3:26
17.	"Down On Me"	Blue Cave, 1996	4:07
18.	"A Hard Day's Night" (John Lennon, Paul McCartney)	Electric Chair, 1998	2:32
19.	"Gene Hackman"	Electric Chair, 1998	2:29
20.	"The Real Deal"	Electric Chair, 1998	4:59

== Album credits ==
Credited to:

- Mark Opitz - producer
- Ed Stasium - producer
- Alan Thorne - producer
- Charles Fisher - producer
- Don Bartley - remastering
- Karen Glauber - liner notes
- Andrzej Liguz - photography
- Francine McDougall - photography
- Adrienne Overall - photography, back cover
- Libby Blainey - artwork

== Charts ==
Chart (2000–2004)	Peak position
Australian (ARIA Charts)	76
New Zealand Albums (RMNZ)	39
