= Electric Soup (album) =

Compilation album by Hoodoo Gurus
- Released: August 1992
- Genre: Rock
- Length: 68:26
- Label: BMG
- Producer: Hoodoo Gurus

Hoodoo Gurus chronology
Kinky (1991)	Electric Soup (1992)	Gorilla Biscuit (1992)

Electric Soup a.k.a. Electric Soup: The Singles Collection is the first compilation album by Australian rock group Hoodoo Gurus and released in August 1992. The album peaked at No. 3 on the ARIA Charts, and was certified triple platinum. For the Electric Soup Tour in November of that year, Hoodoo Gurus were supported by Died Pretty and the Welcome Mat.

At the ARIA Music Awards of 1993, the Best Cover Art category was awarded to Paul McNeil and Richard All for Electric Soup / Gorilla Biscuit. At the ARIA Music Awards Electric Soup was noted as BMG's biggest selling domestic album of the year.

The album was re-released by Mushroom Records in 1999.

== Reception ==
Professional ratings
Review scores
Source	Rating
Allmusic	4.5/5 stars

Chris Woodstra of AllMusic rated Electric Soup at four-and-a-half stars and opined that it "shows the band in the best light, with their catchiest and best-loved songs. An excellent distillation and the best introduction to this sorely underrated brand of Aussie-pop." The Times (Victor Harbor) reviewer felt it was "Over 70 minutes of great melodies wrapped around the throbbing beat of Dave Faulkner's best songs cover a decade which forms the basis of the Hoodoo's singles collection."

== Track listing ==
1. "What's My Scene?"
2. "Bittersweet"
3. "Come Anytime"
4. "My Girl"
5. "1000 Miles Away"
6. "I Want You Back"
7. "Axegrinder"
8. "The Generation Gap"
9. "Death Defying"
10. "A Place in the Sun"
11. "Tojo"
12. "In the Middle of the Land"
13. "Good Times"
14. "Castles in the Air"
15. "Leilani"
16. "Poison Pen"
17. "Another World"
18. "Like Wow - Wipeout!"
19. "Miss Freelove '69"

== Charts ==
=== Weekly charts ===
Chart (1992/93)	Peak position
Australian Albums (ARIA)	3

=== Year end charts ===
Chart (1992)	Peak position
Australian (ARIA Charts)	64

== Certifications ==
Region	Certification	Certified units/sales
Australia (ARIA)	3× Platinum	210,000^{^}
^{^} Shipments figures based on certification alone.
