= Bite the Bullet (Hoodoo Gurus album) =

Compilation album by Hoodoo Gurus
- Released: July 1998
- Genre: Rock
- Label: Mushroom (Australia); Tronador, Limburger (Brazil); Shock Records (Australia)
- Producer: Hoodoo Gurus

Hoodoo Gurus chronology
Armchair Gurus (1997)	Bite the Bullet (1998)	Ampology (2000)

Professional ratings
Review scores
Source	Rating
Allmusic	3/5 stars

Bite the Bullet is a compilation album by Australian rock group Hoodoo Gurus, released in July 1998.

Mushroom also released it as a three-CD limited edition set, Bite the Bullet – Director's Cut, consisting of Bite the Bullet (Live) (a live farewell tour set), Doppelgänger: Live-to-Air Broadcasts '83 – '96 (Triple J Live at the Wireless performances) and Bubble & Squeak: Outtakes and Oddities (a rarities collection). The single CD was re-released in July 2000 by Brazilian record label, Tronador. The 3-CD set was also re-released in June 2003 by Shock Records and Limburger Records.

== Bite the Bullet (Live) ==
Bite the Bullet (Live) was recorded on the Hoodoo Gurus' 1997 52-date Australian farewell tour, and includes classics such as "What's My Scene?" "Tojo," and "Like Wow – Wipeout!" together with previously unreleased songs like "Doctor Rock" and back catalogue cuts.

== Doppelgänger: Live-to-Air Broadcasts '83 – '96 ==
Doppelgänger compiles their best performances on the Australian radio show Live at the Wireless, going back to 1983, and includes covers of The Beatles' "Everybody's Got Something to Hide Except Me and My Monkey", which was performed on their album The Beatles (1968), also known as the White Album, The Detroit Wheels' "Linda Sue Dixon", The Zeros' "Wimp", The Velvet Underground's "I Heard Her Call My Name" and The Stooges' "I Got a Right".

== Bubble & Squeak: Outtakes and Oddities ==
Bubble & Squeak includes seven B-sides (from Crank and Blue Cave sessions) that came after the Gorilla Biscuit B-side compilation album. It also includes a number of covers, unreleased demos, and several tracks dating back to the band's inception in 1981.

The track "Television Addict" was originally available on The Victims LP, All Loud on the Western Front. Founding Gurus' Dave Faulkner (a.k.a. Dave Flick) and James Baker co-wrote the song when they were members of this Perth punk rock group. Baker had left Gurus after their first album Stoneage Romeos and did not record Hoodoo Gurus' version of the song.

"Now I Wanna Sniff Some Glue" and "I Don't Wanna Go Down to the Basement" were both originally recorded by The Ramones on their debut album Ramones (1976), with "Carbona Not Glue" from the Ramones second album Leave Home (1977).

"Lend Me Your Comb" was originally the B-Side of Carl Perkins' "Glad All Over" single, released December 1957 on Sun Records as Sun 287 by "The Rockin' Guitar Man", and was also recorded by The Beatles at the BBC Maida Vale Studios in 1963. The Beatles version was released on their Anthology 1 album in 1995 and again in 2013 on their On Air – Live at the BBC Volume 2 collection.

"You Burn Me Up and Down" was originally recorded by We the People in 1966 and subsequently by The Fuzztones in 1984.

"Hey Gyp, Dig the Slowness" was released as the B-Side to Donovan's third UK single "Turquoise" in 1965. It wasn't initially included on his second album Fairytale but was on the 1966 US re-release.

== Track listing ==
All tracks written by Dave Faulkner unless otherwise indicated:

=== Bite the Bullet (Live) ===
Bite the Bullet cover

1. "Doctor Rock" (Rob Ingram, Dave Brassington) of Apple - 3:12
2. "Down On Me" - 3:12
3. "Come Anytime" - 3:21
4. "Dig It Up" - 3:59
5. "You Open My Eyes" (Brad Shepherd) - 2:59
6. "I Want You Back" - 3:07
7. "Please Yourself" - 3:41
8. "Waking Up Tired" (Shepherd, Faulkner) - 2:39
9. "Tojo" - 2:19
10. "Miss Freelove '69" - 5:44
11. "1000 Miles Away" - 4:22
12. "What's My Scene?" - 3:44
13. "It's Kingsy Time!" (Mark Kingsmill) - 0:50
14. "Be My Guru" (Faulkner, James Baker) - 4:01
15. "The Right Time" - 3:47
16. "Like Wow - Wipeout!" - 4:24
17. "Wild Thing" (Chip Taylor a.k.a. James Voight) - 4:05

=== Doppelgänger ===
Doppelgänger cover

1. "Linda Sue Dixon" (Bonny Rice) - 2:36
2. "Son-of-a-Gun" - 4:02
3. "Hey Anthea" (Shepherd) - 2:48
4. "Quicksand" - 3:21
5. "That's Cool - That's Trash!" (P. F. Sloan, Steve Barri) - 2:57
6. "Everybody's Got Something to Hide Except Me and My Monkey" (John Lennon, Paul McCartney) - 2:32
7. "Wimp" (Javier Escovedo) - 2:59
8. "I Heard Her Call My Name" (Lou Reed) - 2:42
9. "Dressed In Black" (Shepherd) - 2:32
10. "If Only..." - 3:32
11. "I Don't Care" a.k.a. "I Don't Mind" - 1:42
12. "Big Deal" (Shepherd, Faulkner) - 4:25
13. "I Got a Right" (James Osterberg a.k.a. Iggy Pop) - 3:41

=== Bubble & Squeak ===
Bubble & Squeak cover

1. "It's Too Slow" - 4:36
2. "End of the Line" - 3:44
3. "Concerto for Choppers (First Movement: Allegro): The Phreaks Go West" (Shepherd) - 1:46
4. "Concerto for Choppers (Second Movement: Adante): Spahn Ranch" (Shepherd) - 1:51
5. "Concerto for Choppers (Third Movement: Presto): Chickie Run" (Shepherd) - 2:51
6. "Because You're Mine" (Demo) - 1:53
7. "Exorcist" (Demo) - 4:16
8. "Carbona Not Glue" (Live) (Douglas Colvin, Jeffrey Hyman, John Cummings, Tamás Erdélyi: Ramones) - 1:43
9. "Now I Wanna Sniff Some Glue" (Live) (Douglas Colvin, Jeffrey Hyman, John Cummings, Tamás Erdélyi) - 1:24
10. "I Don't Wanna Go Down to the Basement" (Live) (Douglas Colvin, Jeffrey Hyman, John Cummings, Tamás Erdélyi) - 2:27
11. "True to You" (Demo) (Faulkner, Roddy Radalj) - 2:32
12. "Snake Shake" (Demo) (Radalj, Faulkner) - 3:17
13. "We Both Lose" (Demo) - 3:19
14. "Daddy, Yeah!" (Demo) - 3:12
15. "Something I Forgot To Say" (Demo) - 2:55
16. "Television Addict" (Live) (Faulkner, Baker) - 2:47
17. "Lend Me Your Comb" (Live) (Kay Twomey, Ben Weisman, Fred Wise) - 2:44
18. "You Burn Me Up and Down" (Live) (Frank Talton) - 2:32
19. "Hey Gyp, Dig the Slowness" (Live) (Donovan Leitch) - 5:19
20. "Breakfast at Stephanie's" (Demo) - 3:26

== Release history ==
Region	Date	Label
Australia	July 5, 1998	Mushroom
Australia	2002	Mushroom
Australia	June 4, 2003	Shock Records
Brazil	July 3, 2000	Tronador
Brazil	June 4, 2003	Limburger
