= Gorilla Biscuit =

Compilation album by Hoodoo Gurus
- Released: August 1992
- Genre: Rock
- Length: 71:01
- Label: RCA Records/BMG; Mushroom Records
- Producer: Hoodoo Gurus

Hoodoo Gurus chronology
Electric Soup (1992)	Gorilla Biscuit (1992)	Crank (1994)

Professional ratings
Review scores
Source	Rating
Allmusic	3/5 stars

Gorilla Biscuit a.k.a. Gorilla Biscuit: B Sides and Rarities is a compilation album by Australian rock group Hoodoo Gurus, released in August 1992.

It was also released as a 2-CD set with Electric Soup. but also as stand-alone disc. The album peaked at number 99 on the ARIA charts.

== Track listing ==
All tracks written by Dave Faulkner unless otherwise noted.

1. "Spaghetti Western" - 3:33 (B-Side to "Axegrinder", 1989)
2. "I Think You Know" - 3:30 (B-Side to "1000 Miles Away", 1991)
3. "Cajun Country" - 4:03 (B-Side to "Come Anytime", 1989)
4. "Hayride To Hell" - 3:02 (Unreleased version recorded for Stoneage Romeos, 1984)
5. "Hayride To Hell pt.2 (The Showdown)" - 3:46 (B-Side to "In the Middle of the Land", 1988 - recorded live at Air Studios, London for BBC Radio)
6. "Who Do You Love?" (Ellas Otha Bates a.k.a. Bo Diddley) - 2:05 (B-Side to "I Want You Back", 1983 - recorded live at Sydney Trade Union Club by 2JJJ)
7. "Turkey Dinner" - 4:23 (B-Side to "Death Defying", 1986)
8. "Lover For A Friend" - 3:56 (B-Side to "Another World", 1989)
9. "Death Ship" (Faulkner, Roddy Radalj, Alan Sharples) - 2:38 (B-Side to 12" version of "Poison Pen" recorded live at Selinas, Sydney, 1986)
10. "Teenage Head" (Roy Loney, Cyril Jordan) - 3:04 (B-Side to "Poison Pen" - recorded live at Selinas, Sydney, 1986)
11. "Rock'n'Roll pt.2" (Gary Glitter, Mike Leander) - 5:13 (recorded live at Selinas, Sydney, 1986)
12. "The Wedding Song" - 3:51 (Unreleased demo, 1986)
13. "Heart Of Darkness" - 3:10 (B-Side to "What's My Scene?", 1987)
14. "Stomp the Tumbarumba" (Johnny Devlin, Joy Inman) - 3:01 (B-Side to "Miss Freelove '69", 1991)
15. "Little Drummer Boy (Up The Khyber)" (Katherine K. Davis, Henry Onorati, Harry Simeone) - 2:18 (B-Side to "Castles In The Air", 1991 - recorded for A Lump of Coal (1991 Christmas Compilation album by various artists)
16. "Bring The Hoodoo Down" - 3:59 (B-Side to "Like Wow - Wipeout!")
17. "Leilani pt.2" - 3:59 (B-Side to "Leilani", 1982)
18. "Jungle Bells" - 3:36 (B-Side to "The Generation Gap", 1988 and "Castles In The Air", 1992)
19. "Be My Guru" (Faulkner, James Baker - 2:40 (B-Side to "My Girl")
20. "The Doctor Is in" - 6:04 (B-Side to "A Place in the Sun")

== Charts ==
Chart (1992/93)	Peak position
Australian (ARIA Charts)	99
