= Purity of Essence (Hoodoo Gurus album) =

Studio album by Hoodoo Gurus
- Released: 12 March 2010
- Recorded: November–December 2009
- Genre: Rock
- Length: 61:09
- Label: Sony
- Producers: Hoodoo Gurus, Charles Fisher

Hoodoo Gurus chronology
Mach Schau (2004)	Purity of Essence (2010)	Gold Watch: 20 Golden Greats (2012)

Singles from Purity of Essence
- 1. "Crackin' Up" Released: 15 December 2009; 2. "I Hope You're Happy" Released: 5 March 2010; 3. "What's in It for Me?" Released: 2010

Professional ratings
Review scores
Source	Rating
Allmusic	4/5 stars
The Australian	(Positive)
The Age	(Positive)

Purity of Essence is the ninth studio album by Australian group Hoodoo Gurus. It was released on 12 March 2010 and peaked at No. 16 on the ARIA Charts.

The album was co-produced by the band with Charles Fisher, who produced two of the band's previous albums, Mars Needs Guitars! and Blue Cave. The album was mixed by Ed Stasium, who previously worked with the Hoodoo Gurus on the Kinky and Crank.

== Background ==
Hoodoo Gurus were formed in 1981 in Sydney, their eighth studio album, Mach Schau, was released in 2004. They were inducted into the Australian Recording Industry Association (ARIA) Hall of Fame on 18 July 2007. This was followed by a national tour of Australia called 'Clash of the Titans' with The Stems and Radio Birdman. According to Hoodoo Gurus frontman, Dave Faulkner, there were tentative plans to release a new album in 2009, although little material had been written by July 2008.

In March 2009, Hoodoo Gurus signed a new recording contract with Sony Music Australia, the deal includes the band's back catalogue as well as a new album, the band's ninth studio album. The album was originally scheduled for release in September 2009 but they were not happy with the final mix.

We weren't really satisfied with the studio we were in and a whole lot of things, so we had to pull the plug on that and then rethink. We just had to eat the expense, you know, we had to give them a week's cancellation (fee).

— Dave Faulkner

Hoodoo Gurus then sent their songs off to Durango, Colorado, where Ed Stasium, who worked on the band's previous albums Kinky and Crank, worked with Faulkner. Faulkner flew to the US after Hoodoo Gurus performed in Japan, their first performances there in over 20 years.

In August 2009 it was revealed that guitarist Brad Shepherd had been diagnosed with cancer and was recovering from recent surgery. It was his second cancer diagnosis, having had a melanoma removed five years earlier.

The first single from their new album, "Crackin' Up", was released in December 2009 and received some airplay on Australian radio stations. The album, Purity of Essence, was released on 12 March 2010 in Australia and internationally on 11 May.

A limited edition of the album was also released which included a bonus DVD containing four live tracks, part of the "Max Sessions in the Sand", recorded at the St Kilda Festival on 10 February 2008.

== Track listing ==
Purity of Essence
No.	Title	Writer(s)	Length
1.	"Crackin' Up"	Dave Faulkner	3:55
2.	"A Few Home Truths"	Faulkner	3:32
3.	"Are You Sleeping?"	Faulkner	4:35
4.	"Burnt Orange"	Faulkner	3:01
5.	"I Hope You're Happy"	Faulkner	3:43
6.	"Ashamed of Me"	Faulkner	3:55
7.	"What's in It for Me?"	Faulkner	3:23
8.	"Over Nothing"	Faulkner	5:01
9.	"You've Got Another Thing Coming"	Brad Shepherd	2:57
10.	"Only in America"	Faulkner	4:44
11.	"Somebody, Take Me Home"	Faulkner, Shepherd	3:04
12.	"Let Me In"	Faulkner, Shepherd	3:24
13.	"Evening Shade"	Faulkner	3:39
14.	"Why So Sad?"	Faulkner	4:26
15.	"1968"	Faulkner, Shepherd	2:37
16.	"The Stars Look Down"	Faulkner	5:33
Total length:			61:09

Bonus DVD - Live from St Kilda
No.	Title	Length
1.	"Bittersweet" (Music Video)
2.	"Come Anytime" (Music Video)
3.	"1000 Miles Away" (Video)
4.	"I was a Kamikaze Pilot" (Video)

== Personnel ==
Credited to:

Hoodoo Gurus members

- Dave Faulkner – lead vocals, guitar
- Rick Grossman – bass
- Mark Kingsmill – drums
- Brad Shepherd – guitar, vocals

Additional musicians

- Andy Bickers – saxophone (tracks 4, 10)
- Erina Clark – backing vocals (tracks 5, 10)
- Ian Cooper – viola (track 8)
- Garrett Costigan – pedal steel guitar (tracks 11, 16)
- Anthony Kable – trombone (tracks 4, 10)
- Adrian Keating – violin (track 8)
- Stewart Kirwan – trumpet (tracks 4, 10)
- Sophie Serafino – violin (track 8)
- Prinnie Stevens – backing vocals (tracks 5, 10)

Production details

- Engineer – Tim Whitten
  - Engineer assistants – Jason Lea
- Mastering – Greg Calbi at Sterling Sonic, New York
  - Mastering (additional) – Don Bartley (track 1) at Benchmark Mastering, Sydney
- Mixers – Ed Stasium at Kozytone Studio, Durango, Colorado
- Producers – Hoodoo Gurus, Charles Fisher
- Artwork – DK Sony
  - Design and layout – Doug Bartlett
  - Artists – David Bowers, Nick Morris
- Photography – Tony Mott
- Recording studio – Electric Avenue Studios, Camperdown, NSW
  - Additional recording – The Dream Academy (Newport, Vic), Studios 301 (Alexandria, NSW), The Vault (Balmain, NSW)

== Charts ==
Chart (2010)	Peak position
Australian Albums (ARIA)	16

== Release history ==
Region	Date	Label	Format	Catalog
Australia	12 March 2010	Sony Music	CD, Digital download	88697645112
Australia	12 March 2010	Sony Music	Limited Edition CD (with bonus DVD)	88697670902
United States	11 May 2010		CD	881626927724
Worldwide	11 May 2010		CD	881626927724
Brazil	7 Dec 2010	Som Livre	CD	1755-2
