= Gold Watch: 20 Golden Greats =

Golden Watch: 20 Golden Greats

Compilation album by Hoodoo Gurus
- Released: 16 March 2012
- Recorded: 1982–2010
- Genre: Rock
- Length: 72:03
- Label: Sony Music Entertainment
- Producer: Hoodoo Gurus

Hoodoo Gurus chronology
| Purity of Essence (2010) | Golden Watch: 20 Golden Greats (2012) | Gravy Train (2014) |

Singles from Gold Watch: 20 Golden Greats
- 1. "Use-By-Date (Remixed Version)" Released: 2012

Gold Watch: 20 Golden Greats is the sixth compilation album by Australian rock band Hoodoo Gurus, released in 2012. The album peaked at number 15 on the ARIA Charts.

== Reception ==
Professional ratings
Review scores
| Source | Rating |
|---|---|
| AllMusic | 4.5/5 stars |

Mark Deming from AllMusic gave the album 4 out of 5 saying "They were never Australia's biggest rock band or the best, but there are few (if any) bands from the Antipodes who were more consistently, purely enjoyable than the Hoodoo Gurus. Capable of playing revved-up garage rock, sparkling uptempo pop, muscular hard rock, and various combinations thereof, the Hoodoo Gurus could do it all with an engaging sense of humor that never turned their songs into jokes, and with the energy, enthusiasm, swagger, and chops to make their songs come alive and stomp about all night long. The Hoodoos made more than a few brilliant albums in their day, but anyone who doubts their genius as a singles act is advised to avail themselves of Gold Watch: 20 Golden Greats, which compiles the bulk of the band's 7" A-sides and delivers one instant classic after another for 73 minutes. While the majority of the band's fans consider the 1984-1989 stretch to be the band's glory days, give a spin to the latter-day cuts included here and you'll discover that 'Waking Up Tired', 'Miss Freelove '69,' and 'I Hope You're Happy' are just as fine on their own terms, and the new number included here, 'Use-By Date,' confirms this band isn't out of gas just yet. The Hoodoo Gurus have made enough great music that a box set is in order by now, but if you want a single-disc summation of this band's dedication to all that is cool and joyous in rock & roll, then Gold Watch delivers the goods in style."

== Track listing ==
All tracks are written by Dave Faulkner, except where noted

| No. | Title | Writer(s) | Album | Length |
|---|---|---|---|---|
| 1. | "Use-By-Date (Remixed Version)" | | | 2:59 |
| 2. | "Leilani" | Dave Faulkner, James Baker, Roddy Radalj, Kimble Rendall | Single, 1982; later released on Stoneage Romeos | 4:55 |
| 3. | "Tojo" | | Stoneage Romeos, 1984 | 3:22 |
| 4. | "My Girl" | | Stoneage Romeos, 1984 | 2:40 |
| 5. | "I Want You Back" | | Stoneage Romeos, 1984 | 3:10 |
| 6. | "Bittersweet" | | Mars Needs Guitars!, 1985 | 3:51 |
| 7. | "Like, Wow - Wipeout!" | | Mars Needs Guitars!, 1985 | 3:12 |
| 8. | "Death-Defying" | | Mars Needs Guitars!, 1985 | 3:23 |
| 9. | "What's My Scene?" | | Blow Your Cool!, 1987 | 3:49 |
| 10. | "Good Times" | | Blow Your Cool!, 1987 | 3:02 |
| 11. | "Come Anytime" | | Magnum Cum Louder, 1989 | 3:18 |
| 12. | "Axegrinder" | Dave Faulkner, Brad Shepherd, Richard Grossman, Mark Kingsmill | Magnum Cum Louder, 1989 | 3:26 |
| 13. | "Miss Freelove '69" | | Kinky, 1991 | 4:11 |
| 14. | "1000 Miles Away" | | Kinky, 1991 | 4:32 |
| 15. | "Castles In The Air" | | Kinky, 1991 | 4:06 |
| 16. | "The Right Time" | | Crank, 1994 | 3:54 |
| 17. | "Waking Up Tired" | Dave Faulkner, Brad Shepherd | Blue Cave, 1996 | 2:54 |
| 18. | "When You Get To California" | | Mach Schau, 2004 | 3:29 |
| 19. | "I Hope You're Happy" | | Purity of Essence, 2010 | 3:44 |
| 20. | "Crackin' Up" | | Purity of Essence, 2010 | 3:56 |
| Total length: | | | | 72:03 |

== Charts ==
| Chart (2012) | Peak position |
|---|---|
| Australian Albums (ARIA) | 15 |
