= Gold Watch =

Gold Watch may refer to:

- Norwegian Football Association Gold Watch, an award
- Gold Watch: 20 Golden Greats, a 2012 album by Hoodoo Gurus
- "Gold Watch", a song by Lupe Fiasco from the 2007 album Lupe Fiasco's The Cool

== See also ==
- Watch, a portable timepiece which can be made of gold
