= Big Deal =

Big Deal or The Big Deal may refer to:

== Music ==
- Big Deal (band), a rock pop band
- Big Deal, a 1988 album by Killer Dwarfs
- Big Deal, a 2007 album by Black Drawing Chalks
- "Big Deal" (song), a 1999 song by LeAnn Rimes
- "Big Deal", a song by Hoodoo Gurus from the 2000 album Ampology
- "Big Deal", a song by Seaway from the 2013 album Colour Blind

== Film and television ==
- Big Deal (film), a 2025 Korean film
- The Big Deal (2021 TV series), a 2021 Irish reality television series
- The Big Deal, a 1953 American television play written by Paddy Chayefsky
- The Big Deal (film), a 1961 Australian television play
- Big Deal (game show), a 1996 American TV show
- Big Deal (TV series), a 1984–1986 British comedy drama
- Big Deal, a 2021 two-part documentary TV series directed by Craig Reucassel
- The Big Deal, later Movie Mix, a UK digital TV channel
- The Big Deal of the Day, a segment in the American game show Let's Make a Deal

== Other ==
- Big deal (subscription model) in the publishing industry
- Big Deal (musical), a 1986 Broadway musical
- Big Deal: A Year as a Professional Poker Player, a 1992 book by Anthony Holden

== See also ==
- No Big Deal (disambiguation)
