= Armchair Gurus =

Compilation album by Hoodoo Gurus
- Released: October 1997
- Genre: Rock
- Length: 37:23
- Label: Mushroom; Shock Records
- Producer: Hoodoo Gurus

Hoodoo Gurus chronology
Electric Chair (1997)	Armchair Gurus (1997)	Bite the Bullet (1998)

Professional ratings
Review scores
Source	Rating
AllMusic	3/5 stars

Armchair Gurus is a compilation album by Australian rock group Hoodoo Gurus. It was originally released as a 2-CD set with Electric Chair. The album features seventeen Hoodoo Gurus' ballads and slower songs. The album peaked at number 33 on the ARIA Charts and was certified gold.

== Track listing ==
1. "I'm Doing Fine" - 3:31
2. "My Girl" - 2:39
3. "Death Defying" - 3:24
4. "Come On" - 2:43
5. "Shadow Me" - 3:39
6. "1000 Miles Away" - 4:27
7. "Fading Slow" - 4:16
8. "Night Must Fall" - 4:07
9. "Judgement Day" - 3:12
10. "My Caravan" - 4:15
11. "Nobody" - 4:23
12. "Lover for a Friend" - 3:37
13. "Waking Up Tired" - 2:54
14. "Zanzibar" - 3:25
15. "Show Some Emotion" - 2:58
16. "I Was The One" - 4:10
17. "Castles in the Air" - 4:06

== Charts ==
Chart (1997)	Peak position
Australian Albums (ARIA)	33

== Certifications ==
Region	Certification	Certified units/sales
Australia (ARIA)	Gold	35,000^{^}
^{^} Shipments figures based on certification alone.
