= No Big Deal =

No Big Deal may refer to:

- "No Big Deal", a 2019 song from the EP A Fine Mess
- "No Big Deal", a 2021 song from the EP Amphibia: Battle of the Bands
- "No Big Deal" (Sydney Youngblood song), a 1993 single by Sydney Youngblood
- No Big Deal (film), a 2003 film by Bernard Rapp

== See also ==
- Big Deal (disambiguation)
