= Linda Sue Dixon =

Linda Sue Dixon is a song by The Detroit Wheels. In April 1968 it charted worldwide with some success. The song is basically a thinly veiled paean to the illegal hallucinogenic drug LSD, a mind-altering substance which at the time had acquired an iconic status amongst the youth and counterculture movement. The B-side of the single was a song called Tally Ho.

In 1998, a version of Linda Sue Dixon was released by the Australian band Hoodoo Gurus. It has also been recorded by American Rhythm & Blues artist Eddie Floyd. In 2007, the original version along with the "Tally Ho" B-side was re-released on the Complete Motown Singles Vol. 8: 1968 CD on the Hip-o Select label.
