= Gravy Train (EP) =

EP by Hoodoo Gurus
- Released: 24 November 2014
- Label: Hoodoo Gurus, Sony

Hoodoo Gurus chronology
Gold Watch: 20 Golden Greats (2012)	Gravy Train (2014)	Chariot of the Gods (2022)

Gravy Train is the second EP by Australian rock group Hoodoo Gurus and was released by Hoodoo Gurus/Sony in November 2014. This EP includes three tracks not included on their debut studio album as well as a re-recording of their debut single.

== Background and release ==
Dave Faulkner commented: "So many songs lost to mankind forever, perhaps for the best. Three songs, however, always stood out as being short-changed by the restrictions of the vinyl L.P. format, 'Too Bad, She's Bad', 'I Love a Mystery' and 'Voodoo You'... I've always felt they would have held their own alongside their more celebrated siblings on Stoneage Romeos". Faulkner added "When we got together in Sydney to rehearse for Splendour we took the opportunity to record the Gravy Train EP. Each line-up of the band was given its own track though the current, most long-lasting version of the band only appears as part of the all-in version of 'Leilani 2000', the Gurus’ first single and still one of the band's signature songs, this time featuring all eight current and ex-Gurus. The most amazing thing to me was how each re-grouped version of the Hoodoo Gurus captured the sound and spirit they had back in the day."

== Reception ==
Professional ratings
Review scores
Source	Rating
The Music	4/5 stars

Ross Clelland from The Music said "From the tom-tom clatter of 'Too Bad, She's Bad', another couple of remade Stoneage Romeos outtakes from back when, to a magnificently chaotic big jungle rumble take on the eternal 'Leilani 2000' – with all eight past and present Gurus aboard – appreciate again what a great singer and songwriter is Dave Faulkner. And the Hoodoo Gurus as a brand name that – unlike a number of their contemporaries – honour their name and still do the business."

== Track listing ==
1. "Too Bad, She's Bad" – 2:26
2. "I Love a Mystery" – 3:24
3. "Voodoo You" – 3:34
4. "Leilani 2000" – 6:41

== Personnel ==
- Dave Faulkner (guitar) (1, 2, 3, 4)
- James Baker (drums) (1, 2, 4)
- Rod Radalj (guitar) (1, 4)
- Kimble Rendall (guitar) (1, 4)
- Clyde Bramley (bass) (2, 3, 4)
- Brad Shepherd (guitar) (2, 3, 4)
- Mark Kingsmill (drums) (3, 4)
- Richard Grossman (bass) (4)

Credits:
