= Electric Chair (album) =

Compilation album by Hoodoo Gurus
- Released: October 1997
- Genre: Rock
- Length: 37:23
- Label: Mushroom Records; Shock Records
- Producer: Hoodoo Gurus

Hoodoo Gurus chronology
| Hoodoo Voodoo (1997) | Electric Chair (1997) | Armchair Gurus (1997) |

Singles from Electric Chair
- 1. "The Real Deal" Released: November 1997

Professional ratings
Review scores
| Source | Rating |
|---|---|
| Allmusic | 3/5 stars |

Electric Chair is a compilation album by Australian rock group Hoodoo Gurus. It was originally released as a 2-CD set with Armchair Gurus in October 1997. The album features seventeen Hoodoo Gurus' rock/party tracks while Armchair Gurus contains seventeen ballads and slower songs. The album peaked at number 33 on the ARIA charts and was certified gold.

== Track listing ==
1. "The Real Deal" - 4:44
2. "God-Fearing Family Man" - 4:54
3. "Quicksand" - 3:32
4. "Down on Me" - 3:24
5. "Be My Guru" - 2:38
6. "Death Ship" - 2:35
7. "Hypocrite Blues" - 3:00
8. "Glamourpuss" - 2:35
9. "Where's the Action" - 3:40
10. "Brainscan" - 3:19
11. "I Think You Know" - 3:32
12. "I Was a Kamikaze Pilot" - 3:09
13. "Axegrinder" - 3:24
14. "Gene Hackman" - 2:26
15. "A Hard Day's Night" - 2:31
16. "The Right Time" - 3:53
17. "Form a Circle" / "She" - 7:48

== Personnel ==
Credited to:

- Alan Thorne - engineer (tracks: "Be My Guru", "Death Ship", "Glamourpuss", "I Think You Know", "I Was A Kamikaze Pilot", "Axegrinder")
- John Bee - engineer (tracks: "Form A Circle")
- Paul Hamingson - engineer (tracks: "Hypocrite Blues", "Brainscan", "The Right Time")
- Paul McKercher - engineer (tracks: "The Real Deal", "God-Fearing Family Man", "Quicksand", "Down On Me")
- Howie Weinberg - mastering
- David Thoener - mixer (tracks: "Glamourpuss", "Axegrinder")
- Kevin Shirley - mixer (tracks: "The Real Deal", "God-Fearing Family Man", "Quicksand", "Down On Me")
- Dave Collins (tracks: "Hypocrite Blues", "The Right Time", "Form A Circle")
- Adrienne Overall - photography
- Alan Thorne - producer (tracks: "Be My Guru", "Death Ship", "I Was A Kamikaze Pilot")
- Charles Fisher - producer (tracks: "Quicksand", "Down On Me", "Form A Circle")
- Ed Stasium - producer (tracks: "Hypocrite Blues", "The Right Time")
- Hoodoo Gurus (tracks: "The Real Deal", "God-Fearing Family Man", "Quicksand", "Down On Me", "Glamourpuss", "Where's The Action", "Brainscan", "I Think You Know", "Axegrinder", Gene Hackman")

== Charts ==
| Chart (1997) | Peak position |
|---|---|
| Australian Albums (ARIA) | 33 |

== Certifications ==
| Region | Certification | Certified units/sales |
|---|---|---|
| Australia (ARIA) | Gold | 35,000^{^} |
^{^} Shipments figures based on certification alone.
