= Mach Schau (album) =

Studio album by Hoodoo Gurus
- Released: 15 March 2004
- Recorded: November–December 2003
- Genre: Rock
- Length: 40:18
- Labels: EMI/Capitol (AUS/NZ); Acadia (UK); Evangeline (US)
- Producers: Hoodoo Gurus, Kim Salmon

Hoodoo Gurus chronology
Ampology (2000)	Mach Schau (2004)	Purity of Essence (2010)

Singles from Mach Schau
- 1. "Nothing's Changing My Life" Released: 9 February 2004; 2. "When You Get to California" Released: 27 April 2004

Mach Schau
- International release – (Acadia/Evangeline)

Mach Schau is the eighth studio album by the Australian rock group Hoodoo Gurus. It was recorded eight years after their previous studio album, Blue Cave, and released by EMI/Capitol Records on 15 March 2004. It was co-produced by the group with Kim Salmon. The album peaked at number 67 on the ARIA Charts.

== Background and recording ==
In early 2003 the Hoodoo Gurus reunited to record "That's My Team" (a reworked version of "What's My Scene"), which was used as the promotional theme for the National Rugby League between 2003 and 2007. All the profits from the sale of the single, which was released in September 2003, were donated to Breast cancer charities.

On 17 November 2003 EMI Records announced Hoodoo Gurus' reformation to record a new album. They also released the track, "White Night", (a version of the 1986 Torch Song single) as a radio-only single, on 5 December 2003. Whilst "White Night" was not included on the album, it was the B-side to the first single from the album, "Nothing's Changing My Life", and included on the US/UK version of the album. In January 2004 the band co-headlined the annual Big Day Out festival with Metallica and The Strokes. On 25 January 2004 a four-track CD, Proudly Australian – celebrate Australia Day 2004, was given away free with copies of The Sunday Telegraph. The EP included the previously unreleased "Nothing's Changing My Life" by the Hoodoo Gurus.

Hoodoo Gurus's eighth studio album, Mach Schau, was issued on 15 March 2004 in Australia. This was six years after the band had officially split up in January 1998; and almost eight years after their previous studio album, Blue Cave (May 1996). The title is a reference to the German phrase, "make show", which The Beatles were told on each night's performance during their residency in Hamburg, Germany in the early 1960s. By early 2003 the group had re-formed with the previous line-up of Dave Faulkner on lead vocals and guitar; Rick Grossman on bass guitar; Mark Kingsmill on drums; and Brad Shepherd on lead guitar and vocals.

As with previous albums, most of the tracks were written by front man and founding mainstay, Faulkner; whilst two tracks were written by Shepherd. The album was produced by Kim Salmon for Capitol Records/EMI. During Hoodoo Gurus hiatus Faulkner on vocals and guitar; and Salmon (ex-The Scientists, Beasts of Bourbon, Kim Salmon and the Surrealists) on vocals and guitar; had combined to form Antenna which issued a self-titled album in November that year. Salmon described working on Mach Schau, "It has been a challenge and a privilege but mostly lots of fun. As far as jobs go its one of the best I’ve had! So.... even if the band themselves are too modest to blow their own trumpet, I can blow it for them!"

The Australian version of the album includes cover art depicting the group's name in large neon writing with the title small and below the last two letters. Of the album tracks, "Nothing's Changing My Life" features backing vocals by Renée Geyer and Venetta Fields (who performed on Pink Floyd's album, Wish You Were Here, and the Rolling Stones' album Exile on Main St.), while Vicki Peterson (ex-The Bangles) provided backing vocals for "When You Get to California".

Mach Schau's lead single, "Nothing's Changing My Life", appeared a month prior to the album, on 16 February. The CD single included two B-sides, "White Night" and "Keep It Alive".

For its release outside Australia, under the Acadia Records label in the United Kingdom and Evangeline Records in the United States, it was given new cover art. This has the band's name written in a wave form with the title above and to its right; centrally is a panel van with a roof rack and rays emitted from it. The international version also had a revised sequence, with the tracks "Isolation" and "Penelope's Lullaby" removed, and "White Night", "Monkey's Wedding" and "Song of the Year" added.

The US single, "When You Get to California", was released on 27 April that year. It included three additional songs, "Use By Date", "This is Your Time" and "Monkey's Wedding". "Use By Date" was subsequently released as the single from the band's 2012 compilation album, Gold Watch: 20 Golden Greats.

From late March to mid-June, in support of Mach Schau, the group embarked on a 68-date national tour, commencing in Geraldton and finishing in Sydney. Spiderbait joined the tour as special guests, with the exception of the Western Australia dates, where the band was supported by The Fergusons. It was the first major tour by Hoodoo Gurus since their Spit the Dummy Tour in 1997.

== Reception ==
Professional ratings
Review scores
Source	Rating
Allmusic	3.5/5 stars
The Blurb	(positive)
Undercover News	(positive)

AllMusic's Mark Demming gave Mach Schau a rating of 3.5 out of 5 stars and felt that it "pretty well picks up where the band left off when we last visited with them" where the "poppier (and garagier) accents of" early albums was "pushed to the back burner in favor of a harder, guitar-based sound" of later releases. Evan Alexander of The Blurb Magazine opined that the group were "doing what they do best. Gnashing six-string rock, dripping with melody and that pertinent Hoodoo panache". He praised Faulkner's vocals which were "in as fine a form as they’ve ever been" and Shepherd's guitar work "the oomph control knob on [his] amp hasn’t slipped down a notch".

== Track listing ==
All tracks are written by Dave Faulkner, unless otherwise indicated

Australian release on EMI/Capitol Records
No.	Title	Length
1.	"Chop" (Stuart McCarthy – synthesiser)	4:02
2.	"Sour Grapes"	2:54
3.	"Nothing's Changing My Life" (Renée Geyer, Venetta Fields – backing vocals)	3:06
4.	"#17"	2:54
5.	"Domino" (Steve Fitzmaurice – saxophone (baritone))	3:34
6.	"When You Get to California" (Vicki Peterson – backing vocals, Stewart Kirwan – trumpet)	3:30
7.	"This One's for the Ladies" (Stewart Kirwan – trumpet, Andrew Bickers – saxophone, Anthony Kable – trombone) (Brad Shepherd – songwriter)	4:13
8.	"Girls on Top"	2:19
9.	"Dead Sea"	3:56
10.	"Isolation"	3:23
11.	"The Mighty Have Fallen"	3:08
12.	"Good Son"	3:34
13.	"Penelope's Lullaby" (Brad Shepherd – songwriter)	5:45
Total length:		40:18

All tracks are written by Dave Faulkner, unless otherwise indicated

International release on Acadia/Evangeline Records
No.	Title	Length
1.	"Sour Grapes"	2:54
2.	"Domino"	3:33
3.	"Nothing's Changing My Life"	3:06
4.	"The Good Son"	3:34
5.	"When You Get to California"	3:30
6.	"This One's for the Ladies" (Brad Shepherd – songwriter)	4:13
7.	"Girls on Top"	2:19
8.	"Dead Sea"	3:56
9.	"Monkey's Wedding"	3:08
10.	"#17"	2:54
11.	"White Night" (Rico Conning – songwriter)	3:32
12.	"Song of the Year" (Brad Shepherd – songwriter)	2:21
13.	"The Mighty Have Fallen"	3:08
14.	"Chop"	4:02
Total length:		46:10

== Personnel ==
Adapted from the album credits.

=== Hoodoo Gurus ===
- Dave Faulkner – lead vocals, guitar
- Rick Grossman – bass guitar
- Mark Kingsmill – drums
- Brad Shepherd – guitar, vocals

=== Additional ===
Track information relates to Australian release order.

- Engineer – Paul McKercher
- Engineer assistants – Justin Sinclair, Mark Bassett, Peter Jones
- Mastering – Don Bartley
- Mixers – Phillip McKeller (track 6, 8, 10, 12), Tim Whitten (tracks 1 to 5, 7, 9, 11,13)
- Producers – Hoodoo Gurus, Kim Salmon
- Photography – Sophie Howarth
- Recorded by – Charles Fisher (Vicki Peterson's backing vocals track 6)

== Charts ==
Chart (2004)	Peak position
Australian (ARIA Charts)	67
