= The Victims (Australian band) =

Australian punk band from Perth, active from 1977 to 1979

- (L to R): Dave Flick, James Baker, Rudolph V

Background information
- Origin: Perth, Western Australia, Australia
- Genre: Punk rock
- Years active: 1977–1979
- Labels: Victim, Timberyard, 1977/Fuse
- Past members: James Baker; Dave Flick; Rudolph V

The Victims were an Australian punk band from Perth, Western Australia, active from 1977 to 1979. The founding and mainstay members were James Baker on drums, Dave Flick (Dave Faulkner) on guitar and vocals, and Rudolph V (Dave Cardwell) on bass guitar. Their debut single, "Television Addict", was issued in April 1978 and was followed by a five-track EP, The Victims, in August of that year. The group disbanded early in the next year. In 1989 Timberyard Records released a compilation album, All Loud on the Western Front. In late 2014 and early 2015 Baker and Faulkner were joined by Ray Ahn (of Hard-Ons) as the Television Addicts to perform the Victims material. The 2014 and 2015 shows were so well received that the trio assumed the band name The Victims and played sold-out shows at Rosemount Hotel and Mojo's Bar.

== History ==
The Victims were formed in Perth in mid-1977 with James Baker on drums (ex-Beheaded/The Geeks), Dave Flick (real name Dave Faulkner) on guitar and vocals (ex-Beagle Boys) and Rudolph V (real name Dave Cardwell) on bass guitar. Earlier in that year Baker and Cardwell had founded another punk band, the Geeks, with Ross Buncle on guitar and a vocalist, Lloyd. That group folded in May and their original songs formed the core of the Victims' initial repertoire. The group's sound was based on United States proto-punk garage band, the Flamin' Groovies, as well as the Heartbreakers, New York Dolls, and the Stooges. Australian musicologist, Ian McFarlane, commented that "with their frantic, explosive sound backed by a solid melodic bent, The Victims became the premier punk band on the Perth scene."

In 1977 the Victims recorded their debut single, "Television Addict" (Faulkner/Baker) / "I'm Flipped Out Over You" (Baker/Buncle), of which only 1,000 copies were pressed. In August 1978 they released a five-track extended play, The Victims (also known as No Thanks to the Human Turd), with: "I Understand", "Open Your Eyes", "TV Freak", "High School Girls" and "Disco Junkies". Baker was one of the writers of the latter four tracks; the identity of his co-composer was disputed – some sources attributing Faulkner and others citing Buncle – the situation was later resolved, with Buncle acknowledged as co-writer. Only 500 copies of the EP were released. Some versions had hand-drawn sleeves, which McFarlane described as "ultra-rare and highly prized collector's items."

Their performance at Hernando's Hideaway in Perth in January 1978 was recorded: it was issued on the live album, Culture Shock, in 2014. By mid-1978 the Victims had disbanded, they briefly reunited in early 1979 to provide a farewell gig. Baker was a founder of The Scientists (1978–81). Flick reverted to using his surname, Faulkner, and briefly joined Midget and The Farrellys. In late 1979, he joined Mannikins. Baker and Faulkner reunited in January 1981 and founded Hoodoo Gurus in Sydney. Rudolph V became a member of Love Assassins with Mark Hutchinson on guitar, John Rowlings on vocals and Marc Siddall on drums.

In December 1989 the Victims material was issued as a compilation album, All Loud on the Western Front, on Timberyard Records. This included all the tracks from their first single and EP, as well as a previously unreleased track, "Perth Is a Culture Shock". It was re-issued on CD in 2005.

"Television Addict" has been covered by Hoodoo Gurus (both live when Baker was still a member and on record for Crank, 2005 re-issue) and recorded by You Am I, The Hellacopters and Teengenerate. It is also a mainstay of Australian punk compilations. The song was also played live by United States band The Bronx on their 2007 Australian tour. The 2011 compilation, Sleeping Dogs Lie, was issued by Japanese label 1977 Records and distributed in Australia by the Fuse label. In addition to the tracks on All Loud on the Western Front it added two demo songs.

In August 2014 Baker and Faulkner were joined by Ray Ahn (of Hard-Ons) on bass guitar as the Television Addicts at the Rosemount Hotel in North Perth. They performed the Victims material and in February of the following year gigged in Melbourne, Sydney and Brisbane. According to Faulkner, Cardwell was not asked to join as "we ended up not liking the third Victim very much and didn't want to have anything to do with him."

== Discography ==
=== Albums ===
- All Loud on the Western Front Timberyard Records (compilation album, 1989)
- Sleeping Dogs Lie (compilation album, 2011)
- Culture Shock (live album, 2014)

=== Extended plays ===
- The Victims (aka No Thanks to the Human Turd) Independent (August 1978)

=== Singles ===
- "Television Addict" Independent (1977)

=== Compilation appearances ===
- Murder Punk, Volume 1: The Australian Years (1997)
- Murder Punk, Volume 2: The Australian Years (1997)
- Do The Pop! The Australian Garage-Rock Sound 1976-87 Shock Records (2002) (Song: "Television Addict")
- Tales from the Australian Underground: Singles 1976-1989 (2003) (Song: "I'm Flipped Out Over You")
