= Television Addict =

Single by The Victims

from the album All Loud on the Western Front
- B-side: "I'm Flipped Out Over You"
- Released: 1977
- Recorded: Perth, Western Australia 1977
- Genre: Punk rock
- Length: 2:56
- Label: (none/independent) MX-46813
- Songwriter(s): James Baker, Dave Faulkner

The Victims singles chronology
"(No previous single)"	"Television Addict"	""The Victims (EP)" (a.k.a. "no thanks to the human turd")"

Audio sample
- Television Addict: file; help

"Television Addict" was the A-side of the debut single by The Victims, an early punk rock band from Perth, Western Australia. The song is a mainstay of compilations of Australian punk from the 1970s, and has been recorded by the Hoodoo Gurus, You Am I, The Hellacopters and Teengenerate.

It was co-written by singer-guitarist Dave Faulkner (known at the time as Dave Flick) and drummer James Baker. The slow, menacing, bass line, played by Rudolph V (Dave Cardwell), is also a prominent feature of the recording. The Victims released the single independently in late 1977 or early 1978 (sources vary), with "I'm Flipped Out Over You" on the B-side.

Lyrically, "Television Addict" revolves around a youth "who went out and shot someone", and whose lawyer then attributes his actions to violence on television: "blame the ratings for his crime." The song is, in large part, a satirical comment on the tendency to blame popular culture for crime, rather than individuals, or broader social problems. The song ends by questioning why other social phenomena are not attributed to TV programs: "just because I watch Dinah Shore, doesn't mean my brain has slipped, doesn't mean anything — at all."

The band broke up in 1979. During the mid-1980s, Baker and Faulkner were briefly reunited in the Hoodoo Gurus, who sometimes performed "Television Addict" as an encore. The Hoodoo Gurus (without Baker) later recorded "Television Addict", and issued it as a bonus track on Crank (2005 re-issue).
