= You Open My Eyes =

1994 single by Hoodoo Gurus

- Australian single

Single by Hoodoo Gurus

from the album Crank
- B-side: "Something I Forgot to Say"; "Television Addict" (live)
- Released: 10 January 1994
- Length: 3:20
- Label: RCA; BMG
- Songwriter: Brad Shepherd
- Producer: Ed Stasium

Hoodoo Gurus singles chronology
"The Right Time" (1993)	"You Open My Eyes" (1994)	"Less Than a Feeling" (1994)

"You Open My Eyes" is a song by Australian rock group Hoodoo Gurus. It was released in January 1994 as the second single from their sixth studio album, Crank. The song peaked at number 43 on the Australian Singles Chart. This was the first Hoodoo Gurus single that was not written or co-written by Dave Faulkner.

In June 2000, Dave Faulkner said: "[I] found Brad taking over lead vocal duties on a Hoodoo Gurus single. Though Brad had sung on every album since Mars Needs Guitars! this was the first time that people started crying out, 'It's a hit!'"

== Track listing ==
CD single

1. "You Open My Eyes" – 3:20
2. "Something I Forgot to Say" – 2:57
3. "Television Addict" – 3:25 (recorded live to air in Perth on 31 October 1993)

== Personnel ==
- Richard Grossman – bass
- Dave Faulkner – lead vocals, guitar, keyboards
- Mark Kingsmill – drums
- Brad Shepherd – guitar, vocals
- Vicki Peterson – backing vocals (track 1)
- Production – Ed Stasium (track 1), Hoodoo Gurus (tracks 2, 3)
- Engineering – Paul Hamingson (track 1)

== Charts ==
Chart (1994)	Peak position
Australia (ARIA)	43
