= The Right Time (Hoodoo Gurus song) =

1993 single by Hoodoo Gurus

Single by Hoodoo Gurus

from the album Crank
- B-side: "Road Hog"; "Wait for the Sun"
- Released: 11 October 1993
- Length: 3:55
- Label: RCA; BMG
- Songwriter: Dave Faulkner
- Producer: Hoodoo Gurus

Hoodoo Gurus singles chronology
| "Castles in the Air" (1991) | "The Right Time" (1993) | "You Open My Eyes" (1994) |

"The Right Time" is a song by Australian rock group Hoodoo Gurus. It was released in October 1993 as the lead single from the group's sixth studio album, Crank. The song peaked at number 41 on the Australian ARIA Singles Chart.

In June 2000, Dave Faulkner said that the song "was originally conceived to be just one of a suite of songs, a mini-opera like the Who's A Quick One as I strived to fulfil my Wagnerian masterplan to revive the '70s concept album (c.f. Radiohead). Two other songs from Crank, "Hypocrite Blues" and "Gospel Train", also survive from the grand opus. "The Right Time" was intended as the theme for a female gang of motorcycle hellcats, but of course that's obvious."

== Track listing ==
CD single

1. "The Right Time" – 3:55
2. "Road Hog" – 2:30
3. "Wait for the Sun" – 3:05

== Personnel ==
- Richard Grossman – bass
- Dave Faulkner – lead vocals, guitar, keyboards
- Mark Kingsmill – drums
- Brad Shepherd – guitar, vocals
- Production – Ed Stasium (track 1), Hoodoo Gurus (tracks 2, 3)
- Engineering – Paul Hamingson (track 1), Charles Fisher (tracks 2, 3)
- Mixing – Greg Calbi (track 1), Darius Sulic (tracks 2, 3)
- Mastering – Greg Calbi

== Charts ==
| Chart (1993) | Peak position |
|---|---|
| Australia (ARIA) | 41 |
