= Blow Your Cool! =

Studio album by Hoodoo Gurus
- Released: April 1987
- Genre: Rock
- Length: 42:48
- Label: Big Time, Elektra, Chrysalis
- Producer: Mark Opitz; Hoodoo Gurus

Hoodoo Gurus chronology
| Mars Needs Guitars! (1985) | Blow Your Cool! (1987) | Magnum Cum Louder (1989) |

Singles from Blow Your Cool!
- 1. "What's My Scene?" Released: March 1987; 2. "Good Times" Released: July 1987; 3. "In the Middle of the Land" Released: December 1987

Professional ratings
Review scores
| Source | Rating |
|---|---|
| AllMusic | 4.5/5 stars |
| Rolling Stone | 4/5 stars |

Blow Your Cool! is the third studio album by Australian rock group Hoodoo Gurus. It was released on 24 April 1987 and peaked at number 2 on the Australian chart.

In 2009, Dave Faulkner said "When the Blow Your Cool! touring was over Clyde retired from the road and the band. At this point we persuaded Rick Grossman to join, contributing his tremendous bass skills to the band, and so we had reached what was to be our ultimate line-up. After that we only changed our haircuts (and underwear)." .

EMI re-released the album on February 6, 2005 with four additional tracks, a fold out poster and liner notes by Vicki Peterson of the Bangles. One of the additional tracks, "The Generation Gap" was their first recording with Grossman, and had been released as a single-only in 1988; it was their cover of Jeannie C. Riley's 1970 country song.

== Reception ==
Cash Box magazine said "Australia's good rocking band is back with their most cohesive set to date. With help from LA’s Bangles and Dream Syndicate, the LP has an American flavor likely to touch off a tidal wave of interest at progressive retail outlets and alternative and/or adventurous radio."

Faulkner said, "There's so many things that you wish you could do again. One would obviously be Blow Your Cool. If we could do that the way we see it should be – I mean, of course it was a very successful record and people love it, but for us personally it just felt like a missed opportunity, or we kind of fumbled the ball."

== Track listing ==
All tracks are written by Dave Faulkner, except where noted

| No. | Title | Length |
|---|---|---|
| 1. | "Out That Door" | 4:14 |
| 2. | "What's My Scene" | 3:50 |
| 3. | "Good Times" | 3:02 |
| 4. | "I Was the One" | 4:10 |
| 5. | "Hell for Leather" | 3:28 |
| 6. | "Where Nowhere Is" | 4:00 |
| 7. | "In the Middle of the Land" | 4:34 |
| 8. | "Come On" | 2:43 |
| 9. | "Heart of Darkness" (Song is not included on the original LP release.) | 3:04 |
| 10. | "My Caravan" | 4:15 |
| 11. | "On My Street" | 3:16 |
| 12. | "Party Machine" | 5:10 |

2005 re-release
| No. | Title | Writer(s) | Length |
|---|---|---|---|
| 13. | "Hell for Leather" (live) | | 3:12 |
| 14. | "Hayride to Hell, Pt 2 (The Showdown)" | | 3:39 |
| 15. | "The Generation Gap" | Charlie Craig, Betty Craig, Jim Hayner | 3:42 |
| 16. | "Jungle Bells" | | 3:37 |

== Personnel ==
Credited to:

=== Hoodoo Gurus ===
- Dave Faulkner – lead vocals, guitar, keyboards
- Brad Shepherd – guitar, harmonica
- Mark Kingsmill – drums
- Clyde Bramley – bass

=== Additional musicians ===
- The Bangles (Susanna Hoffs, Debbi Peterson, Vicki Peterson, Michael Steele) – background vocals (tracks 3 & 12)
- The Calamity Bake Sails
- Dream Syndicate members Steve Wynn & Mark Walton – background vocals (track 7)
- Mike Kloster (engineer for the Bangles) – background vocals (track 12)
- Stevo Glendinning – background vocals (track 12)
- Mark Opitz – background vocals (track 12)
- Geoff Rhoe – background vocals (tracks 6 & 12)
- Paul Thirkell – background vocals (track 7)
- Allan Wright – background vocals (track 12)
- Malcolm Eastick (Stars, Broderick Smith's Big Combo) – guitar (track 1)
- James Valentine (Models) – saxophone (tracks 4 & 10)

=== Production details ===
- Richard Allan – Art Direction, Cover Design
- Allan Wright – Engineer
- Heidi Cannavo, Kathy Nauton, Paula Jones, Tchad Blake — Assistant Engineers
- Mark Opitz – Producer
- Barry Diament – Mastering

== Charts ==
| Chart (1987) | Peak position |
|---|---|
| Australian (Kent Music Report) | 2 |
| New Zealand Albums (RMNZ) | 16 |
| Swedish Albums (Sverigetopplistan) | 32 |
| United States (Billboard 200) | 120 |

== Certifications ==
| Region | Certification | Certified units/sales |
|---|---|---|
| Australia (ARIA) | Gold | 35,000^{^} |
^{^} Shipments figures based on certification alone.
