= Good Times (Hoodoo Gurus song) =

Single by Hoodoo Gurus

from the album Blow Your Cool!
- B-side: "Hell for Leather" (live)
- Released: 13 July 1987
- Genre: Pop rock
- Length: 3:02
- Label: EMI
- Songwriter: Dave Faulkner
- Producer: Mark Opitz

Hoodoo Gurus singles chronology
"What's My Scene?" (1987)	"Good Times" (1987)	"In the Middle of the Land" (1987)

"Good Times" is a song by Australian rock group Hoodoo Gurus. It was written by Dave Faulkner and released in July 1987 as the second single from the group's third studio album, Blow Your Cool!. The song peaked at number 36 on the Australian charts.

In June 2000, Dave Faulkner said "Brad was off gallivanting in Los Angeles to supervise the recording of the Bangles harmonies on 'Good Times'. We had toured with them the previous year promoting Mars Needs Guitars! and we watched then go to No. 1 with "Manic Monday" as the tour began. Oh well, so much for the co-headline. That tour and its sequel two years later were some of the most fun we ever had on the road."

== Track listing ==
7" version (BTS8)

1. "Good Times" (Dave Faulkner) — 3:02
2. "Hell for Leather" (live) (Faulkner) — 3:12

== Personnel ==
- Dave Faulkner – lead vocals, guitar, keyboards
- Brad Shepherd – guitar, harmonica
- Mark Kingsmill – drums
- Clyde Bramley – bass
- The Bangles (Susanna Hoffs, Debbi Peterson, Vicki Peterson, Michael Steele) – background vocals
- Richard Allan – Art Direction, Cover Design
- Allan Wright – Engineer
- Heidi Cannavo, Kathy Nauton, Paula Jones, Tchad Blake — Assistant Engineers
- Mark Opitz – Producer
- Barry Diament – Mastering

== Charts ==
Chart (1987)	Peak position
Australia (Kent Music Report)	36
