= The Generation Gap (song) =

Single by Hoodoo Gurus
- B-side: "Jungle Bells"
- Released: 1988
- Genre: Rock
- Length: 3:40
- Label: RCA
- Songwriter(s): Charlie Craig, Betty Craig, Jim Hayner
- Producer(s): The Gurus (credit as per label)

Hoodoo Gurus singles chronology
| "In the Middle of the Land" (1987) | "The Generation Gap" (1988) | "Come Anytime" (1989) |

"The Generation Gap" is a song written by Charlie Craig, Betty Craig, and Jim Hayner and recorded by American country music singer Jeannie C. Riley for her 1970 studio album of the same name. Released as the B-side to her single "My Man", it peaked at number 62 on the Billboard Hot Country Songs chart in December 1970. The song was later covered by Australian rock group Hoodoo Gurus. It was released in December 1988 and peaked at number 50 on the ARIA Charts.

In June 2000, Dave Faulkner said "... we persuaded Rick Grossman to join, contributing his tremendous bass skills ... Almost immediately we were in the studio recording a single-only release 'The Generation Gap', a song originally recorded by Jeannie C. Riley (of "Harper Valley PTA" fame). I changed a couple of lines to suit myself but the ones about grown-ups getting stoned were from the original.".

== Track listing ==
7" single (RCA Victor – 104977)

1. "The Generation Gap" (Charlie Craig, Betty Craig, Jim Hayner) — 3:40
2. "Jungle Bells" (Faulkner) — 3:36

== Personnel ==
Credits

- Dave Faulkner — lead vocals, guitar
- Richard Grossman — bass, backing vocals
- Mark Kingsmill — drums
- Brad Shepherd — guitar, backing vocals

== Charts ==
=== Jeannie C. Riley ===
| Chart (1970) | Peak position |
|---|---|
| US Hot Country Songs (Billboard) | 62 |

=== Hoodoo Gurus ===
| Chart (1988) | Peak position |
|---|---|
| Australia (ARIA) | 50 |
