= Come Anytime =

1989 single by Hoodoo Gurus

Single by Hoodoo Gurus

from the album Magnum Cum Louder
- B-side: "Cajun Country"; "Hallucination"
- Released: May 1989
- Length: 3:18
- Label: RCA
- Songwriter: Dave Faulkner
- Producer: Hoodoo Gurus

Hoodoo Gurus singles chronology
"The Generation Gap" (1987)	"Come Anytime" (1989)	"Axegrinder" (1989)

Alternative cover
- 7-inch picture disc artwork

"Come Anytime" is a song by Australian rock group Hoodoo Gurus. It was released in May 1989 as the lead single from the group's fourth studio album, Magnum Cum Louder (1989). "Come Anytime" peaked at number 27 on the Australian ARIA Singles Chart and at number one on the US Billboard Modern Rock Tracks chart. The song is featured as the theme for the Australian television programme Thank God You're Here. In June 2000, vocalist and guitarist Dave Faulkner said that "'Come Anytime' [...] best described as a romantic song about an unromantic subject but you can reverse the adjectives and the statement would be equally correct."

== Composition ==
Faulkner said, "The closest I came to trying to copy something I'd already done, really, was writing "Come Anytime", where I was kind of writing something in a similar energy and effervescence as "What's My Scene?". But it didn’t come out like "What's My Scene?", you know? It was its own thing."

== Track listings ==
Australian 7-inch and cassette single

1. "Come Anytime" – 3:18
2. "Cajun Country" – 4:03

Australian CD single

1. "Come Anytime"
2. "Cajun Country"
3. "Hallucination"

== Personnel ==
- Dave Faulkner – lead vocals, guitar, keyboards
- Richard Grossman – bass, backing vocals
- Mark Kingsmill – drums, vocals (grunts)
- Brad Shepherd – guitar, backing vocals, harmonica
- Hoodoo Gurus – production
- Alan Thorne – engineering
- David Thoener – mixing

== Charts ==
Chart (1989)	Peak position
Australia (ARIA)	27
US Modern Rock Tracks (Billboard)	1

== See also ==
- List of Billboard number-one alternative singles of the 1980s
