= Miss Freelove '69 =

Single by Hoodoo Gurus

from the album Kinky
- B-side: "Stomp the Tumbarumba"
- Released: February 1991
- Genre: Psychedelic rock
- Length: 4:02
- Label: RCA
- Songwriter: Dave Faulkner
- Producer: Hoodoo Gurus

Hoodoo Gurus singles chronology
"Another World" (1989)	"Miss Freelove '69" (1991)	"1000 Miles Away" (1991)

"Miss Freelove '69" is a song by Australian rock group Hoodoo Gurus, released in February 1991 as the lead single from the group's fifth studio album, Kinky. The song peaked at number 19 on the ARIA Charts and number 3 on the Billboard Modern Rock Tracks.

In June 2000, Dave Faulkner said "...[it] was written on the morning after the events described in the song, although I gave them some embellishment to provide a happy ending: the real police declined to join the party (at least they didn't shut it down). Miss Freelove herself was meant to be the incarnation of Bacchus but if she was anyone, she was me!".

== Track listing ==
7" single (RCA 105202)

1. "Miss Freelove '69" — 4:02
2. "Stomp the Tumbarumba" — 3:05

CD single (CCD023)

1. "Miss Freelove '69" — 4:02
2. "Stomp the Tumbarumba" — 3:05
3. "Brainscan" — 3:20

== Personnel ==
- Richard Grossman — bass, backing vocals
- Dave Faulkner — lead vocals, guitar, keyboards
- Mark Kingsmill — drums, percussion
- Brad Shepherd — guitar, backing vocals, harmonica
- Producer — Hoodoo Gurus
- Engineer — Alan Thorne
- Assistant Engineers — David Mackie, Robert Hodgson
- Mixer — Ed Stasium (tracks 1 & 3), Paul Hamingson
- Mastering — Greg Calbi

== Charts ==
=== Weekly charts ===
Chart (1991)	Peak position
Australia (ARIA)	19

=== Year end charts ===
Chart (1991)	Peak position
Australian (ARIA Charts)	97
