= In the Middle of the Land =

Single by Hoodoo Gurus

from the album Blow Your Cool!
- B-side: "Hayride to Hell, part 2 (The Showdown)"
- Released: December 1987
- Genre: Rock
- Length: 4:06
- Label: Big Time
- Songwriter: Dave Faulkner
- Producer: Charles Fisher

Hoodoo Gurus singles chronology
"Good Times" (1987)	"In the Middle of the Land" (1987)	"The Generation Gap" (1988)

"In the Middle of the Land" is a song by Australian rock group Hoodoo Gurus. It was released in December 1987 as the third and final single from the group's third studio album, Blow Your Cool!. The song peaked at number 79 in early 1988.

In June 2000, Dave Faulkner said "... [it] was written about one of my pet subjects: evangelical preachers and their hypocrisy. As a later song of mine says, 'Follow any creed / If my freedom's guaranteed / I don't mind.'".

Dream Syndicate members Steve Wynn & Mark Walton provided background vocals for this single.

== Track listing ==
7" version (BTS16)

1. "In the Middle of the Land" (Dave Faulkner) — 4:06
2. "Hayride to Hell, part 2 (The Showdown)" (Faulkner) — 3:29

== Personnel ==
Credits:

- Clyde Bramley — bass, backing vocals
- Dave Faulkner — lead vocals, guitar
- Mark Kingsmill — drums, cymbals
- Brad Shepherd — guitar, backing vocals
- Producer — Charles Fisher
- Engineer — John Bee
- Mastering — Don Bartley

== Charts ==
Chart (1988)	Peak position
Australian (Kent Music Report)	79
