= Magnum Cum Louder =

Studio album by Hoodoo Gurus
- Released: June 1989
- Genre: Rock
- Length: 40:12
- Label: RCA/BMG; EMI
- Producer: Hoodoo Gurus

Hoodoo Gurus chronology
Blow Your Cool! (1987)	Magnum Cum Louder (1989)	Kinky (1991)

Alternative cover
- 2005 re-release

Singles from Magnum Cum Louder
- 1. "Come Anytime" Released: May 1989; 2. "Axegrinder" Released: July 1989; 3. "Another World" Released: September 1989

Professional ratings
Review scores
Source	Rating
Allmusic	4/5 stars
Robert Christgau	B−

Magnum Cum Louder is the fourth studio album by Australian rock group Hoodoo Gurus. The album was produced by the group, and released in Australia in June 1989 and peaked at number 13.

Faulkner later said, "We produced the record ourselves for our own morale, if nothing else. We had been through a very rough period with six months of inactivity from a lawsuit to get free of our old contract. Rather than even telling the record company what we were recording we let them hear it after it was all finished, and luckily they liked it! We would have been in deep trouble otherwise."

The album was re-released by EMI on 7 February 2005 with three bonus tracks, "Spaghetti Western", "Lover for a Friend", and "Cajun Country", a fold out poster and liner notes by Steve MacDonald (Redd Kross).

The lead track "Come Anytime" was the theme song of Australian television series Thank God You're Here during its initial run from 2006 to 2009, and is currently the main theme for the revived series of the show from 2023 onwards, as well as the American series of the show in 2007.

The album title is a play on 'Magna Cum Laude', a Latin honour added to a diploma or degree for work considered to be of much higher quality than average.

== Track listing ==
All tracks are written by Dave Faulkner, except where noted

No.	Title	Writer(s)	Length
1.	"Come Anytime"		3:20
2.	"Another World"		3:16
3.	"Axegrinder"	Faulkner, Brad Shepherd, Richard Grossman, Mark Kingsmill	3:27
4.	"Shadow Me"		3:41
5.	"Glamourpuss"		2:26
6.	"Hallucination"		5:05
7.	"All the Way"		3:11
8.	"Baby Can Dance (Parts 2–4)"	Shepherd, Faulkner	3:17
9.	"I Don't Know Anything"		4:07
10.	"Where's That Hit?"		3:56
11.	"Death in the Afternoon"		4:08

2005 re-release
No.	Title	Length
12.	"Cajun Country"	3:57
13.	"Spaghetti Western"	3:33
14.	"Lover for a Friend"	3:39

== Personnel ==
- Dave Faulkner – Lead vocals, guitar, keyboards
- Richard Grossman – Bass guitar, backing vocals
- Mark Kingsmill – Drums, backing vocals (grunts)
- Brad Shepherd – Guitar, harmonica, backing vocals
- Stephanie Faulkner – Backing vocals (track 11)
- Engineer – Alan Thorne
- Mixer – David Thoener
- Producer – Hoodoo Gurus

== Charts ==
=== Weekly charts ===
Chart (1989)	Peak position
Australian Albums (ARIA)	13
New Zealand Albums (RMNZ)	45
Swedish Albums (Sverigetopplistan)	27
United States (Billboard 200)	101

=== Year end charts ===
Chart (1989)	Peak position
Australian (ARIA Charts)	84

== Certifications ==
Region	Certification	Certified units/sales
Australia (ARIA)	Platinum	70,000^{^}
^{^} Shipments figures based on certification alone.
