= Crank (Hoodoo Gurus album) =

Studio album by Hoodoo Gurus
- Released: February 1994
- Genre: Rock
- Length: 37:23
- Label: Zoo Entertainment
- Producer: Ed Stasium

Hoodoo Gurus chronology
Gorilla Biscuit (1992)	Crank (1994)	Blue Cave (1996)

Singles from Crank
- 1. "The Right Time" Released: October 1993; 2. "You Open my Eyes" Released: January 1994; 3. "Less than a Feeling" Released: April 1994; 4. "Nobody" Released: July 1994

Professional ratings
Review scores
Source	Rating
Allmusic	3/5 stars

Crank is the sixth studio album by Australian rock group Hoodoo Gurus. It was released in February 1994 and peaked at number 2 on the ARIA charts. The album was produced by Ed Stasium (Ramones, Living Colour, The Smithereens), who had mixed Hoodoo Gurus previous studio album, Kinky in 1991. It was the band's first release on Zoo Records.

EMI re-released the album on 6 February 2005 with an additional nine bonus tracks, a fold out poster and liner notes by Andy Strachan (The Living End). One of the bonus tracks is "Television Addict" which was originally performed by Perth punk band The Victims in 1977 with Gurus' Dave Faulkner known as Dave Flick. "Turn Up Your Radio" originally by Australian band The Masters Apprentices was released in 1995 as a single credited to The Masters Apprentices with Hoodoo Gurus.

== Track listing ==
All tracks are written by Dave Faulkner, except where noted

No.	Title	Writer(s)	Length
1.	"The Right Time"		3:54
2.	"Crossed Wires"		3:06
3.	"Quo Vadis"		4:08
4.	"Nobody"		4:24
5.	"Form a Circle"	Brad Shepherd	3:40
6.	"Fading Slow"	Shepherd	4:18
7.	"Gospel Train"		2:58
8.	"Less Than a Feeling"		3:34
9.	"You Open My Eyes"	Shepherd	3:17
10.	"Hypocrite Blues"		3:02
11.	"I See You"		1:59
12.	"Judgement Day"	Faulkner, Shepherd	3:12
13.	"The Mountain"		4:38

2005 re-release
No.	Title	Writer(s)	Length
14.	"Road Hog"	Shepherd	2:31
15.	"Wait for the Sun"		3:18
16.	"End of the Line"		4:03
17.	"Television Addict"	James Baker, Faulkner	2:47
18.	"Something I Forgot to Say""		2:55
19.	"Deform a Circle"	Shepherd	5:32
20.	"Wimp"	Javier Escovedo	3:00
21.	"I Heard Her Call My Name"	Lou Reed	2:42
22.	"Turn up Your Radio ('95)"	Jim Keays, Doug Ford	3:31

== Personnel ==
Credited to:

=== Hoodoo Gurus ===
- Dave Faulkner – guitar, keyboards, vocals
- Rick Grossman – bass
- Mark Kingsmill – drums, rataplan
- Brad Shepherd – guitar, vocals

=== Additional musicians ===
- Vicki Peterson (The Bangles) – background vocals (tracks 9 & 10)
- Wendy Wild – background vocals (track 13)
- Steven MacDonald – role of The Disciple (lead vocals) (one verse of track 10)

=== Additional credits ===
- Cover – Paul McNeill
- Editors – Dave Collins, Pat Sullivan (assistant)
- Engineer – Paul Hamingson
- Mastering – Greg Calbi
- Mixer (assistant) – John Aguto
- Producer – Ed Stasium
- Photo (band) – Andrej Ligur
- Photography – Adrienna Overall
- Recorder (assistant) – Matt Westfield

== Charts ==
=== Weekly charts ===
Chart (1994)	Peak position
Australian Albums (ARIA)	2

=== Year end charts ===
Chart (1994)	Peak position
Australian (ARIA Charts)	76

== Certifications ==
Region	Certification	Certified units/sales
Australia (ARIA)	Gold	35,000^{^}
^{^} Shipments figures based on certification alone.
