= Death Defying =

Single by Hoodoo Gurus

from the album Mars Needs Guitars!
- B-side: "Turkey Dinner"
- Released: February 1986
- Genre: Rock
- Length: 3:19
- Label: Big Time
- Songwriter: Dave Faulkner
- Producer: Charles Fisher

Hoodoo Gurus singles chronology
"Like Wow - Wipeout!" (1985)	"Death Defying" (1986)	"Poison Pen" (1986)

"Death Defying" is a song by Australian rock group Hoodoo Gurus. It was written by Dave Faulkner. and released in February 1986 as the third single from the group's second studio album, Mars Needs Guitars! The song peaked at No. 43 on the Australian charts.

Faulkner has said the song was written to address the HIV/AIDS crisis that was robbing him of friends in the mid-1980s.

In June 2000, Dave Faulkner said "One of my favourite songs I've written... I have vivid memories of shooting the video in Kakadu National Park after having awoken to see the news footage of the Challenger Space Shuttle exploding during take-off."

== Track listing ==
7" single (BTS 1692)

1. "Death Defying" — 3:19
2. "Turkey Dinner" — 4:14

== Personnel ==
- James Baker — drums
- Clyde Bramley — bass, backing vocals
- Dave Faulkner — lead vocals, guitar
- Mark Kingsmill — drums, cymbals
- Brad Shepherd — guitar, backing vocals, harmonica
- Producer — Charles Fisher
- Engineer — John Bee
- Mastering — Don Bartley

== Charts ==
Chart (1986)	Peak position
Australian (Kent Music Report)	43
