= Axegrinder =

1989 single by Hoodoo Gurus

Single by Hoodoo Gurus

from the album Magnum Cum Louder
- B-side: "Spaghetti Western"
- Released: July 1989
- Genre: Hard rock
- Length: 3:18
- Label: RCA
- Songwriters: Dave Faulkner, Brad Shepherd, Richard Grossman, Mark Kingsmill
- Producer: Hoodoo Gurus

Hoodoo Gurus singles chronology
"Come Anytime" (1989)	"Axegrinder" (1989)	"Another World" (1989)

"Axegrinder" is a song by Australian rock group Hoodoo Gurus. It was released on RCA Records in July 1989 as the second single from their fourth studio album Magnum Cum Louder. The song peaked at number 58 on the ARIA charts.

In June 2000, Dave Faulkner said "I often describe 'Axegrinder' as the song that 'killed' Magnum Cum Louder. We had enjoyed considerable airplay for 'Come Anytime' but 'Axegrinder' stopped everything cold. Funnily enough, it became one of our biggest showstoppers in concert within 12 months."

== Track listing ==
7" single (RCA Victor 105 071)

1. "Axegrinder" — 3:27
2. "Spaghetti Western" — 3:23

== Personnel ==
Credits:

- Richard Grossman — bass, backing vocals
- Dave Faulkner — lead vocals, guitar, keyboards
- Mark Kingsmill — drums, vocals (grunts)
- Brad Shepherd — guitar, backing vocals, harmonica
- Producer — Hoodoo Gurus
- Engineer — Alan Thorne
- Mixer — David Thoener

== Charts ==
Chart (1989)	Peak position
Australia (ARIA)	58
