= Kinky (Hoodoo Gurus album) =

Studio album by Hoodoo Gurus
- Released: 9 April 1991
- Recorded: 1990
- Studio: Trafalgar Studio
- Genre: Rock
- Length: 37:23
- Label: RCA
- Producer: Hoodoo Gurus

Hoodoo Gurus chronology
Magnum Cum Louder (1989)	Kinky (1991)	Electric Soup (1992)

Singles from Kinky
- 1. "Miss Freelove '69" Released: February 1991; 2. "1000 Miles Away" Released: May 1991; 3. "A Place in the Sun" Released: August 1991; 4. "Castles in the Air" Released: December 1991

Professional ratings
Review scores
Source	Rating
Allmusic	3/5 stars

Kinky is the fifth studio album by Australian rock group Hoodoo Gurus. It was released on 9 April 1991 by RCA Records and peaked at number 4 on the Australian charts and number 172 on the American Billboard charts.

EMI re-released the album on 7 February 2005 with four additional tracks, a fold out poster and liner notes by Dave Gray (Rocket Science).

== Track listing ==
All tracks are written by Dave Faulkner, except where noted

No.	Title	Writer(s)	Length
1.	"Head In the Sand"	Faulkner, Richard Grossman	2:49
2.	"A Place In the Sun"		3:47
3.	"Castles In the Air"		4:08
4.	"Something's Coming"	Faulkner, Brad Shepherd	3:12
5.	"Miss Freelove '69"		4:15
6.	"1000 Miles Away"		4:33
7.	"Desiree"	Shepherd	2:34
8.	"I Don't Mind"		3:40
9.	"Brainscan"	Faulkner, Shepherd	3:18
10.	"Too Much Fun"	Faulkner, Shepherd	3:14
11.	"Dressed in Black"	Shepherd	2:44

2005 re-release
No.	Title	Writer(s)	Length
12.	"Stomp The Tumbarumba"	Johnny Devlin, Joy Inman	3:02
13.	"I Think You Know"		3:32
14.	"The Doctor Is In"		6:05
15.	"Little Drummer Boy (Up the Kyber)"	Harry Simeone, Henry Onorati, Katherine Davis	2:21

== Personnel ==
Album is credited to: Hoodoo Gurus members

- Dave Faulkner - Guitar, vocals, keyboards
- Mark Kingsmill - Drums, metal percussion, metal objects
- Brad Shepherd - Guitar, vocals
- Richard Grossman - Bass, vocals (background)

Additional musicians

- Vicki Peterson - Backing vocals (track 6)
- Rob Younger - Vocals (track 9)
- Stephanie Faulkner - Backing vocals (track 2)
- Sunil DeSilva - Additional Percussion (track 3)

Additional credits

- Engineer — Alan Thorne
- Assistant Engineers — David, Mackie, Robert Hodgson
- Mastering — Greg Calbi
- Mixers — Ed Stasium, Paul Hamingson
- Assistant Mixer — Kyle Bess
- Producer — Hoodoo Gurus

== Charts ==
=== Weekly charts ===
Chart (1991)	Peak position
Australian Albums (ARIA)	13
New Zealand Albums (RMNZ)	28
United States (Billboard 200)	172

=== Year end charts ===
Chart (1991)	Peak position
Australian (ARIA Charts)	64

== Certifications ==
Region	Certification	Certified units/sales
Australia (ARIA)	Platinum	70,000^{^}
^{^} Shipments figures based on certification alone.
