= 1000 Miles Away =

1991 single by Hoodoo Gurus

Single by Hoodoo Gurus

from the album Kinky
- B-side: "I Think You Know"
- Released: 6 May 1991
- Length: 4:34
- Label: RCA
- Songwriter: Dave Faulkner
- Producer: Hoodoo Gurus

Hoodoo Gurus singles chronology
"Miss Freelove '69" (1991)	"1000 Miles Away" (1991)	"A Place in the Sun" (1991)

"1000 Miles Away"
- Back cover

"1000 Miles Away" is a song by Australian rock band Hoodoo Gurus. It was released in May 1991 as the second single from the group's fifth studio album, Kinky. "1000 Miles Away" peaked at number 37 on the Australian Singles Chart.

In June 2000, Dave Faulkner said, "Many people have told me '1000 Miles Away' is their favourite Gurus song and it's also among my top ten. There are references to airports and flying but I was writing about emotional distance rather than physical travel."

The crew of Royal Australian Navy frigate HMAS Canberra had an association with the song after they adopted it as their 'anthem'. Hoodoo Gurus played a concert including the Replenishment At Sea song "1000 Miles Away" on-board during their last voyage out of Fremantle to Fleet Base West, prior to its decommissioning in 2005.

== Track listings ==
7-inch single

1. "1000 Miles Away" – 4:34
2. "I Think You Know" – 3:30

CD single

1. "1000 Miles Away" – 4:34
2. "I Think You Know" – 3:30
3. "Stomp the Tumbarumba" – 3:05

== Personnel ==
- Richard Grossman – bass, backing vocals
- Dave Faulkner – lead vocals, guitar, keyboards
- Mark Kingsmill – drums, percussion
- Brad Shepherd – guitar, backing vocals, harmonica
- Producer – Hoodoo Gurus
- Engineer – Alan Thorne
- Assistant Engineers – David Mackie, Robert Hodgson
- Mixer – Ed Stasium
- Mastering – Greg Calbi

== Charts ==
Chart (1991)	Peak position
Australia (ARIA)	37
