= What's My Scene? =

Single by Hoodoo Gurus

from the album Blow Your Cool!
- B-side: "Heart of Darkness"
- Released: March 1987
- Genre: Power pop
- Length: 3:49
- Label: Big Time, Elektra, Mushroom
- Songwriter: Dave Faulkner
- Producer: Mark Opitz

Hoodoo Gurus singles chronology
| "Poison Pen" (1986) | "What's My Scene?" (1987) | "Good Times" (1987) |

"What's My Scene?" is a song by Australian rock group Hoodoo Gurus. It was released in March 1987 as the lead single from their third studio album Blow Your Cool!. The song reached number 3 in Australia.

In June 2000, Dave Faulkner said "Whenever I'm asked to name a favourite of my songs I usually choose this one, not because I think it's 'the best' but because it best captures everything I try to do when writing any song. I wouldn't change a note or a syllable of this one and I'm especially proud that it has two different choruses when one is usually enough."

In January 2018, "What's My Scene?" was ranked number 67 on Triple M's "Ozzest 100", the 'most Australian' songs of all time.

== Track listings ==
7" single (BTS 2)

1. "What's My Scene?"
2. "Heart of Darkness"

== Personnel ==
- Dave Faulkner – lead vocals, guitar, keyboards
- Brad Shepherd – guitar, harmonica
- Mark Kingsmill – drums
- Clyde Bramley – bass
- Allan Wright – engineer
- Mark Opitz – producer

== Charts ==
=== Weekly charts ===
Weekly chart performance for "What's My Scene?"
| Chart (1987) | Peak position |
|---|---|
| Australia (Australian Music Report) | 3 |
| New Zealand (Recorded Music NZ) | 35 |

=== Year-end charts ===
Year-end chart performance for "What's My Scene?"
| Chart (1987) | Position |
|---|---|
| Australia (Australian Music Report) | 25 |

== In popular culture ==
- The original Hoodoo Gurus recording features in episode four of We Can Be Heroes: Finding The Australian of the Year (2005).

== "That's My Team" ==
A variation titled "That's My Team" was used by the National Rugby League (NRL) as their theme for the 2003 to 2007 seasons. In 2003 the NRL had approached former Cronulla Sharks player and then current Parramatta Eels assistant coach Alan Wilson to provide the theme for their advertising campaign. Wilson hit upon the idea of using Hoodoo Gurus' 1987 hit "What's My Scene?" with reworked lyrics as "That's My Team".

Wilson and Faulkner made the necessary arrangements which included re-uniting Gurus to re-record the track. Faulkner is a long-time supporter of Cronulla and the original promo clip for "What's My Scene?" included shots of band members in Wests and Cronulla jumpers. The Hoodoo Gurus performed "That's My Team" on the 2006 and 2007 Grand Final editions of The Footy Show. A sports commentary can be heard in the quieter parts of the original song.

A CD of "That's My Team" was released for public sale in September 2003, with all money raised donated to the Kim Walters Choices Programme and the Joanne Mackay Foundation, breast cancer charities established by husbands Kevin Walters and Brad Mackay, respectively.

"That's My Team" was parodied in episode 14 of Australian satire show The Chaser's War on Everything as "Where's My E?" (E as a slang term for ecstasy) to reflect a perceived increase in recreational drug use among players in Australian football codes. The accompanying video included various drug references interspersed with nightclub and games scenes.

The song was also parodied on the Channel 7 sketch show Big Bite as "Where's My Team?" referring to exclusion of the North Sydney Bears from the top level Rugby League in Australia.
