= Mark Kingsmill =

Australian rock musician (born 1956)

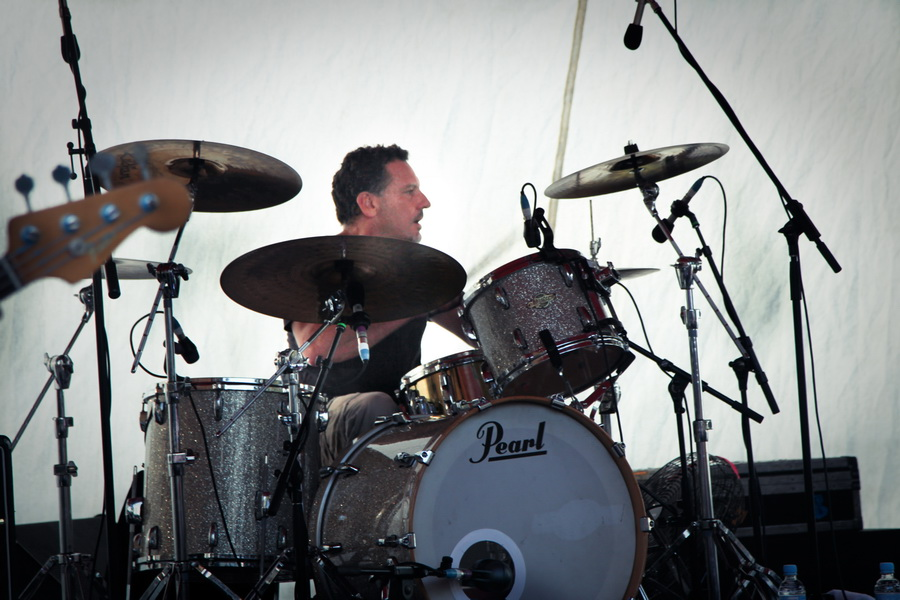
- Kingsmill with Hoodoo Gurus, Rottnest Island, April 2012

Background information
- Also known as: Jim Boots, Drum Stick
- Born: Mark Adrian Kingsmill; 4 December 1956 (age 69); Sydney, New South Wales, Australia
- Genre: Rock
- Occupations: Musician, drummer, songwriter
- Instruments: Drums, vocals
- Years active: 1977–2015

Mark Adrian Kingsmill (born 4 December 1956) is an Australian rock musician. He has drummed with several bands including the Hitmen (1979–84), New Christs (1983–84), the Screaming Tribesmen (1984) and Hoodoo Gurus (1984–98, 2003–15). He is the older brother of Richard Kingsmill, former music director and presenter on Triple J.

== Early life and education ==
Mark Kingsmill was born in Sydney on 4 December 1956.

== Career ==
=== Early days ===
In early 1977 in Sydney Kingsmill, on drums, joined vocalist Ron Peno's (aka Ronnie Pop) band, the Hellcats, with Charlie Georges on guitar and Gary Petersen on bass. Ian McFarlane, an Australian musicologist, described the group as "a tough New York Dolls-inspired covers band". The Hellcats often supported fellow punk rockers, Radio Birdman.

Later that year Kingsmill, under the pseudonym Jim Boots, joined another local punk band, The Thought Criminals, with the line-up of Roger Grierson (aka Jack Boots) on guitar, Rique Lee Kendall (aka Matt Black) on bass guitar and Bruce Warner (aka Kit Identity) on lead vocals. Kingsmill performed on their first recording, an EP, Hilton Bomber. It was released in 1978 on their own label, Doublethink. Kingsmill was replaced by the Last Words' drummer, Ken Doyle (aka Derik Wapillspoon).

Kingsmill was the original drummer and member of his next band, The Other Side, along with Clyde Bramley and Charlie Georges, and was replaced by Ron Keeley, when Kingsmill departed to join the Hitmen. This reunited Keely with Rob Younger (ex-Radio Birdman) on lead vocals.

=== Hitmen ===
Kingsmill, using the moniker Drum Stick, joined Sydney-based rockers, the Hitmen, in 1979 on drums and backing vocals, alongside Warwick Gilbert (Leonardo da Vinci) on guitar, Johnny Kannis (Adonis) on lead vocals, Chris Masuak (Han Debris) on lead guitar and Phil Sommerville (Cole Slaw) on bass guitar. In March 1979 WEA had signed the band and in July they issued their first single, "Didn't Tell the Man", with a line-up of Kingsmill, Gilbert, Kannis, Masuak and Tony Vidale on guitar. The band's next single "I Want You" was released in April. In December 1980 they worked with producer Mark Opitz to record their debut album.

Midway through recording Vidale quit and was replaced by guitarist Brad Shepherd (ex-Fun Things). The album, Hitmen, was released in July 1981; preceded a month earlier by the single, "I Don't Mind". McFarlane opined that the album and single "were excellent slices of melodic hard rock." In November 1981 the group supported Steppenwolf on the Australian leg of their tour. Tony Robertson on bass guitar replaced Gilbert during that tour. Kingsmill and Masuak co-wrote "Scratch the Itchy Brother" which was later issued on a compilation album, Kicks Right Now.... Demos and Out-Takes (November 2015).

In 1982 Shepherd and fellow flatmate, Bramley, formed a side project, a bubble gum pop group, Super K, to record a single "Go Go", for which Kingsmill played drums. The Hitmen issued two more singles, "Everybody Knows (I Don't Like Love)" (April 1982) and "Bwana Devil" (November), with another album, It is What It Is, in November. Shepherd left ahead of the album and the Hitmen continued to tour as a four-piece. McFarlane declared that they would "draw big crowds on tour, but could not sell records." They were dropped by their label, RCA, and disbanded in mid-1983.

=== New Christs ===
In June 1983 Younger reformed his earlier band, the New Christs, with Kingsmill on drums, Masuak on guitar, Robertson on bass guitar and Kent Steedman on lead guitar (ex-the Celibate Rifles). They supported an Australian tour by Iggy Pop and then Steedman returned to the Celibate Rifles. He was replaced by Richard Jakimyszyn on guitar (ex-Lime Spiders). This version of the New Christs issued two singles, "Like a Curse" (April 1984) and "Born out of Time" (April 1986), on Citadel Records. McFarlane felt they were "consummate, guitar-driven, hard rock". AllMusic's Jack Rabid reviewed "Like a Curse", as being "more slam-bang rock with great rhythm from a man who has it coursing in his bones." The group's music was used on the soundtrack of the feature film, Going Down (1983). This line-up of the New Christs broke up in May 1984. In June Kingsmill, Masuak and Robertson all joined rock group, the Screaming Tribesmen, which was re-established by founding mainstay, Mick Medew on guitar and lead vocals.

=== Hoodoo Gurus ===
In August 1984 Kingsmill left New Christs to join the Hoodoo Gurus, a rock new wave group, for their first United States tour. This reunited him with former bandmates, Bramley and Shepherd, alongside Hoodoo Gurus' founding mainstay, Dave Faulkner on lead vocals, guitar and keyboards. Kingsmill replaced founding drummer James Baker. Baker later told Sylvester Fox of Groove Magazine, "'They just sacked me.' So there's nothing mysterious about it? 'No no!!' What were the reasons given? 'Musical differences.'"

Following the band's US tour they returned to Australia and recorded their second studio album, Mars Needs Guitars!, for which Kingsmill co-wrote the title track with the other members of the band, including Baker. The track also appeared as the B-side to the album's first single, "Bittersweet". Their next two albums are Blow Your Cool! in 1987 and Magnum Cum Louder in 1989. Kingsmill is attributed as a co-writer on the second single taken from Magnum Cum Louder, "Axegrinder", which peaked at No. 60 on the ARIA Singles Chart. The band released another three studio albums, Kinky in 1991, Crank in 1994 and Blue Cave in 1996. In 1997 the group announced their forthcoming disbandment, they undertook a final three-month Australian tour, which commenced in October 1997 and finished in January 1998. In July 1998 the band's label, Mushroom Records issued a live album, Bite the Bullet, containing tracks that had been recorded during the band's farewell tour. This included a short instrumental, "It's Kingsy Time", written and performed by Kingsmill.

In September 2001, the four ex-Gurus (Faulkner, Grossman, Kingsmill and Shepherd) performed as The Moops, and were later called Persian Rugs. As the Persian Rugs they recorded a five-track EP, Mr. Tripper. In June 2002, Grossman left, and was replaced by bassist Kendall James (ex Thurston Howlers, Crusaders). The new line-up of the Persian Rugs recorded their debut album, Turkish Delight, which was released in August 2003. In early 2003 Hoodoo Gurus reformed and in the following March they released their eighth studio album, Mach Schau, undertaking tours of Australia, Europe and the United States. It wasn't until March 2010 that they released their next album Purity of Essence.

Hoodoo Gurus' iconic status on the Australian rock scene was acknowledged when they were inducted into the 2007 ARIA Hall of Fame. In January 2015 the band announced that Kingsmill would be retiring from the band – thirty one years after joining. His last performances were in May 2015, at the Be My Guru – Evolution Revolution concerts at Sydney's Powerhouse Museum as part of the Vivid Festival. According to Faulkner, Kingsmill left because "he feels he's had enough of this vagabond rock 'n' roll lifestyle we all lead. Though he still enjoys playing drums, Mark has completely lost his appetite for the endless travelling and the many hours of hotel room boredom. The physical demands of playing the drums as energetically as he does are also exacting a higher toll on his body than ever before." He was replaced in the group by Nik Rieth. Kingsmill briefly returned to Hoodoo Gurus in March 2016, he temporarily replaced Rieth for their Day of the Green tour.

== Personal life ==
Kingsmill's younger brother, Richard was a presenter on the Australian youth radio, triple j, for decades, and later director of several stations at ABC Radio, until his resignation in December 2023.

Kingsmill was married to Catherine, a fabric artist based in Maitland, New South Wales. The pair had met in 1978 and had one child together. They subsequently divorced, Catherine declared "we are still friends. A marriage is just really hard to keep together when you're not together, but we never had a falling out or anything like that.”

In mid-1996 Kingsmill injured himself, two weeks into the start of Hoodoo Gurus' Blue Cave Tour; he had leapt up from his drum kit and toppled backwards. He tore tendons and nerves in his left arm, which required surgery before he could rejoin the group and resume their tour.

== Discography ==
- The Thought Criminals (1977–1978)
  - Hilton Bomber (EP) – Doublethink (June 1978)
- The Hitmen (1979–1983)
  - "Didn't Tell the Man"/"I Am the Man" - WEA (7" single (1979)
  - "I Want You/Tell Tale Heart" - WEA (7" single) (1980)
  - "I Don't Mind/Rock & Roll Soldier" - WEA (7" single) (1981)
  - The Hitmen – WEA (1981)
  - "Everybody Knows (I Didn't Like Love)" b/w "Dancin' Time" – RCA (7" Single) (1982)
  - "Bwana Devil" b/w "Didn't Wanna Love You" – WEA (7" Single) (1982)
  - It Is What It Is! – RCA (1982)
- Super K (1982)
  - "Go Go" b/w "Recurring Nightmare" – Green (7" Single) (1982) Citadel Records re-release (1985)
- New Christs (1983-1984)
  - "Like a Curse"/"Sun God" - Citadel (7" single) (April 1984)
  - "Born out of Time"/"No Next Time" - Citadel (7" single) (April 1986)
- Hoodoo Gurus (1984–1998) (2003–2015)
- Persian Rugs (2001–2004)
  - Mr Tripper – SOS/Shock (EP) (2002)
  - Turkish Delight – Shock (2003)
  - "Be My Guru" (recorded 2004) on Stoneage Cameos (2005) see Stoneage Romeos
