= Richard Grossman (bassist) =

Australian rock musician (born 1959)

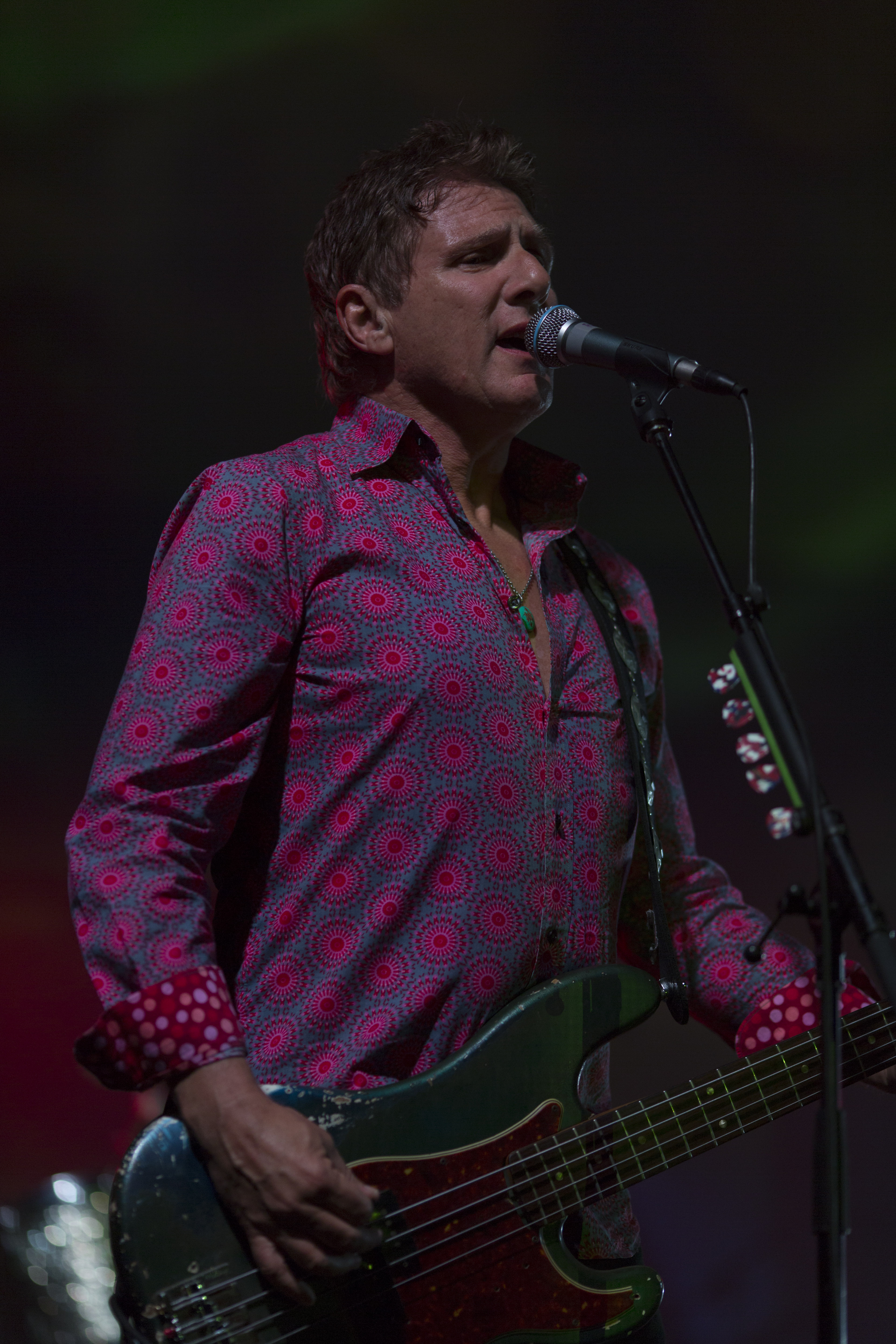
- Grossman in May, 2015.

Background information
- Also known as: Rick Grossman
- Born: Sydney, New South Wales, Australia
- Genre: Rock
- Occupation: Musician
- Instrument: Bass guitar
- Years active: 1976–present

Richard Grossman is an Australian rock musician who has played bass guitar for two iconic bands: Divinyls and Hoodoo Gurus. Hoodoo Gurus' status on the Australian rock scene was acknowledged when they were inducted into the 2007 ARIA Hall of Fame. For Grossman, this was his second Hall of Fame induction in a row; the 2006 award was for his stint with Divinyls. Often referred to as Rick Grossman, he has also performed with other Australian bands: Matt Finish, Ghostwriters, Persian Rugs, The Kelly Gang and Men at Work.

== Biography ==
=== Early bands ===
Between 1976 and 1979, Grossman played bass for several minor bands, including Hellcats, Parachute, Bleeding Hearts, Eric Gradman's Man and Machine and The Traitors.

=== Matt Finish ===
Grossman attended first Scots College and then Sydney Boys High School with John Prior drummer of Matt Finish and also became friends with singer/songwriter Matt Moffitt when he joined the band in 1980. Grossman performed on their debut album Short Note (1981, #14 in the Australian charts) and the associated single Short Note went gold. He also played on Fade Away (live EP, 1981); but as a result of Moffitt's declining health, the band split up at the end of 1981.

=== Divinyls ===
Grossman then spent five years (1982–1987) as bass guitarist for Divinyls replacing Jeremy Paul (ex Air Supply) just after they had recorded the soundtrack for the film Monkey Grip in 1982. Divinyls were led by Christina Amphlett (vocals) and Mark McEntee (guitars). Together with Grossman they recorded two albums Desperate (1983, No. 5 Kent Music Report Album Charts) and What a Life! (1985, No. 4). Which included their hit singles, "Science Fiction" (1983, No. 13 Kent Music Report Singles Chart), and "Pleasure and Pain" (1985, No. 11 Kent and No. 12 U.S. Mainstream Rock Tracks). Divinyls, including Grossman, were honoured by being inducted into the ARIA Hall of Fame in 2006.

Grossman left Divinyls when he entered rehab for heroin addiction, and was replaced by Matthew Hughes four days after he was admitted to a detox clinic.

=== Hoodoo Gurus ===
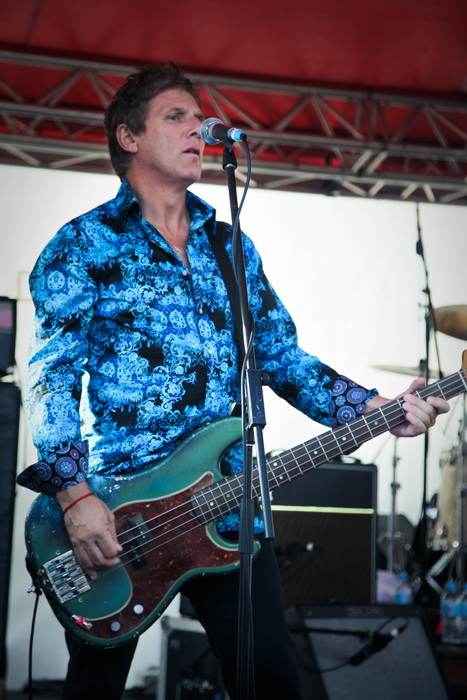
Bass guitarist Richard Grossman at Rottnest Island in April 2012

In 1988 Grossman replaced Clyde Bramley in Hoodoo Gurus on bass. Their most stable line-up of Dave Faulkner (guitar, vocals, main songwriter, keyboards), Grossman, Mark Kingsmill (drums, percussion) and Brad Shepherd (lead guitar, vocals, harmonica) saw Hoodoo Gurus from 1988 to the break-up in January 1998.

Grossman has been involved in the reformed Hoodoo Gurus (2003–present), including the release of their latest album Chariot of the Gods (2022) and subsequent tours both nationally and internationally. Hoodoo Gurus co-headlined the 2004 Big Day Out festival with Metallica and The Strokes.

Hoodoo Gurus toured during 2007 including several US dates, kicking off at the South By Southwest Music Festival in Austin, TX, performances in Europe, including the Azkena Festival (Spain) followed by a national tour of Australia called 'Clash of the Titans', with The Stems and Radio Birdman. Another solo Hoodoo Gurus tour started late in 2007 (including performances at the Apollo Bay Music Festival, Splendour in the Grass, Meredith Music Festival, and the St Kilda Festival) and continued into 2008.

Hoodoo Gurus were inducted into the 2007 ARIA Hall of Fame, this was the second time for Grossman who had already been inducted as a member of Divinyls in 2006.

=== Ghostwriters ===
From 1990 onwards, Grossman has been involved in a side project, Ghostwriters, with Rob Hirst from Midnight Oil. Ghostwriters have released four albums Ghostwriters (1991), Second Skin (1996), Fibromoon (1999, by Rob Hirst and The Ghostwriters) and their latest release Political Animal (2007 Sony BMG). Fellow Guru, Shepherd played as a session musician with Ghostwriters on their albums Ghostwriters and Fibromoon. In 1996, Hirst also teamed up with Australian Olympian turned musician, Paul Greene, to form Hirst and Greene: they produced a single "Best Impression" / "When God's Not Busy" (1996) with Grossman on bass. Ghostwriters (i.e. Hirst and Grossman) were producers and session musicians for Various Artists album Olympic Record (2000), other performers included Greene. Hirst and Greene, with Grossman playing bass, released In the Stealth of Summer (2005) together with other musicians that would be used on Ghostwriters' Political Animal.

=== Matt Moffitt ===
During 2001, Grossman performed 20 concerts with long-time friend Matt Moffitt (1956–2003) singer-songwriter and founder of Matt Finish. Grossman had been an early member (1980–1981) and returned to compile and promote Just a Short Note (Best of) (December, 2001). When Moffitt died in September 2003, Grossman delivered one of the eulogies.

=== Finding Joy ===
In 2001, Grossman contributed the title track to the independent Australian feature film Finding Joy (released in 2003), performing all of the instruments and singing the vocals.

=== Persian Rugs ===
In September 2001, the four ex-Gurus (Faulkner, Grossman, Kingsmill & Shepherd) performed as The Moops (later called Persian Rugs). At Homebake 2001, (8 December) both Hoodoo Gurus and Persian Rugs performed separate sets. Just after Persian Rugs recorded a five-track EP Mr. Tripper (June, 2002), Grossman left, they recruited bassist Kendall James (ex Thurston Howlers, Crusaders) and recorded an album Turkish Delight (August, 2003).

"We recorded an EP about 18 months [ago] with all ex-Hoodoo Gurus members, Rick Grossman played bass on that as well but he has other things going on [in] his life which is always the way of the musician. We had a bass player vacancy going on in the band. I had seen Kendall playing in a band called the Crusaders which were very much in the same realm." - Brad Shepherd, 2003.

=== The Kelly Gang ===
The Kelly Gang was a 2004 project Grossman formed with Jack Nolan, they brought in Hirst and Scott Aplin (Waikiki) to record Looking for the Sun (July, 2004) which has one of Sidney Nolan's iconic "Ned Kelly" series as its album cover. Brad Shepherd (Hoodoo Gurus) also performed on the album as a session musician. On their tour debut guitarist Martin Rotsey (Midnight Oil) and session drummer Pete Skelton joined the band.

== Personal life ==
Grossman has admitted that his heroin drug abuse forced him out of The Divinyls in 1987, he nearly died from overdosing and The Buttery Drug and Alcohol Rehab Centre helped him get clean; Grossman is now a patron of The Buttery and also a drug rehab counsellor. On 10 November 2008, Australian Story episode "All the Boys in Town" featured Grossman, he mentioned his recovery from heroin addiction at The Buttery and described his project to gain funding for their rehab centre: a CD Caution: Life Ahead! with performances and royalties donated by various artists. Grossman is married and lives in Sydney and, when not touring or recording, is a lecturer at JMC Academy Australia, providing instruction in Creative Industries Course: Popular Music and Performance. He also developed 'Flight Deck', a studio for aspiring songwriters, in 2000.

Rick has two children Amelia and Michael Grossman.

== Discography ==
- Matt Finish (1979–1981, 2001)
  - "Matt Finish Play Africa" / "CIA" / "Mancini Shuffle" (1980)
  - "Short Note" / "Layman's Day" (1981)
  - Short Note (LP) (1981)
  - Fade Away (EP) (1981)
  - Just a Short Note (Best of) (2001)
- Divinyls (1982–1987)

See Divinyls discography for full list. Studio albums with Grossman:

  - Desperate (1983)
  - What a Life! (1985)
- Hoodoo Gurus (1988–1998), (2003–present)

See Hoodoo Gurus discography for full list or for a quick link to albums and singles use infobox below. Studio albums with Grossman:

  - 1989 Magnum Cum Louder
  - 1991 Kinky
  - 1996 Blue Cave
  - 2004 Mach Schau
- Ghostwriters (1990–present)
  - Ghostwriters (1991)
  - Second Skin (1996)
  - Fibromoon (credited to Rob Hirst and The Ghostwriters) (1999)
  - produced & session musician on Olympic Record by Various Artists (2000)
  - Political Animal (2007)
- Persian Rugs (aka Moops) (2001–2002)
  - Mr. Tripper (EP) (2001)
- The Kelly Gang (2004)
  - Looking for the Sun (2004)
