= Kibble =

Kibble may refer to:

- Dry compound feed, especially when used as dog food or cat food
- chalk and flint rubble, also known as kibble in East Devon, used to consolidate ground
- a large bucket, as used to raise ore from a mine shaft, see shaft mining
- a rock of crack cocaine
- kibbled wheat, a type of coarsely milled flour

== People ==
- Brendan Kibble (born 1963), Australian musician
- Bryan Kibble (1938–2016), British physicist and metrologist who invented the Kibble balance for measuring mass
- Chris Kibble (born 1963), British jazz musician
- George Kibble (1865–1923), English cricketer
- Jack Kibble (John Westly Kibble; 1892–1969), American baseball player
- Jeff Kibble, Canadian politician
- John Kibble (1865–1951), British stonemason, historian and writer
- Karima Kibble (née Trotter; born 1974), American Gospel singer
- Nita Kibble (1879–1964), Australian librarian
- Tom W. B. Kibble (1932–2016), British theoretical physicist, interests included quantum field theory and topological defects
- Tom Kibble (rugby union) (born 2000), Australian rugby union player
- Graham Kibble-White, British writer

== Other uses ==
- Kibble Palace, a greenhouse in Glasgow
- Nita Kibble Literary Award, an Australian literary award for biographical or life writing
- Kibble balance, an electromechanical weight measuring instrument

== See also ==
- Kibbles (disambiguation)
- George Kibbler (c. 1900–1929), English rugby league footballer of the 1920s
- Kibbeling, a Dutch snack
