= Philip Karto =

French designer and businessman (born 1973)

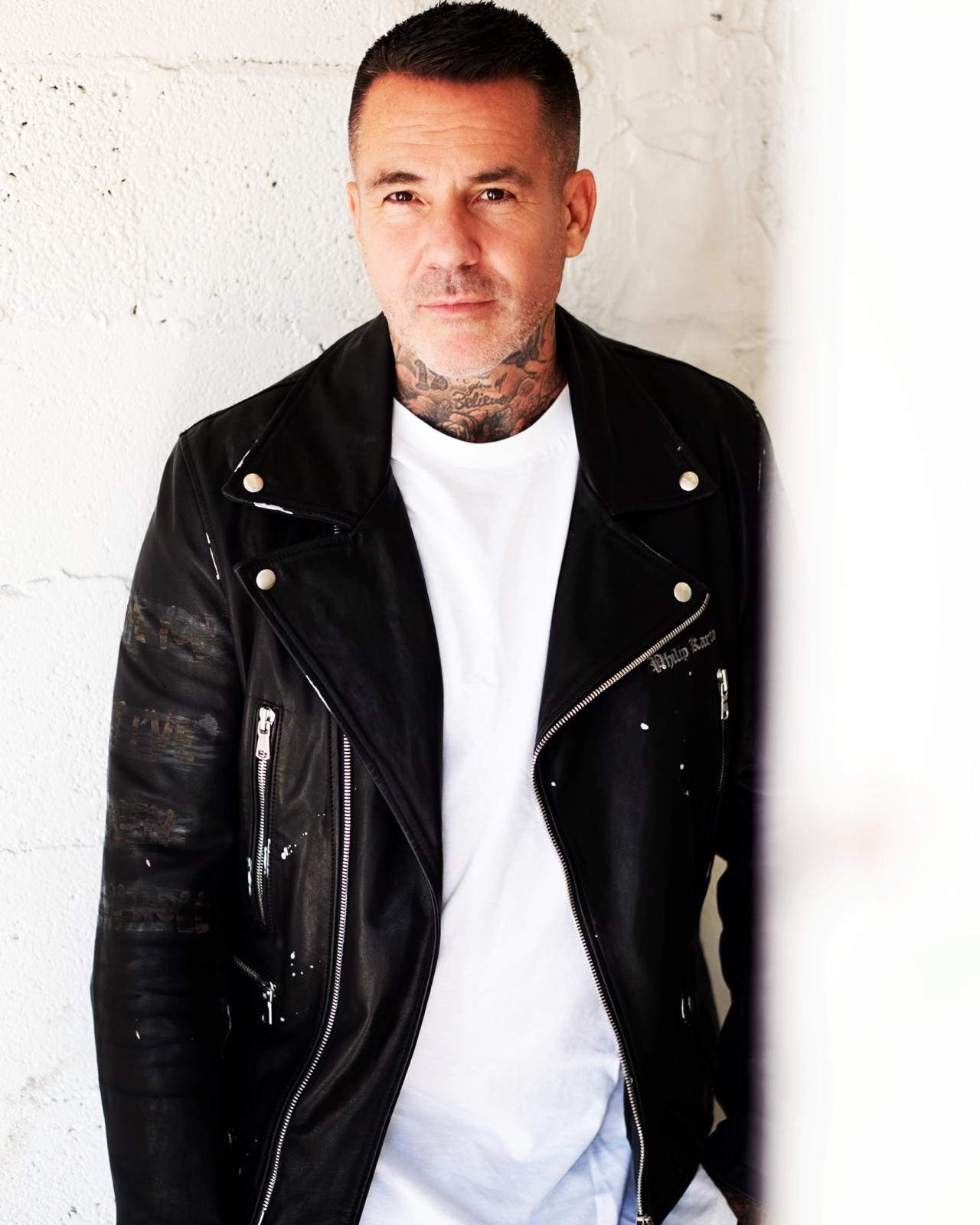
- Born: Phillipe Carteau; 12 February 1973 (age 52); Toulon, France
- Occupations: Businessman; designer
- Labels: Caption (2004–2006); Philip Karto (2017–present)
- Website: philipkarto.com

Phillipe Carteau (also known as Philip Karto) is a French businessman and fashion designer. He is the founder of the Philip Karto brand that customizes vintage luxury leather handbags.

Karto's work includes collages, sculptures, and jewelry design but he's most commonly known for his customization work in modifying high-end dated luxury items.

== Early life ==
Karto grew up in Bandol but was born in Toulon, the South of France on 12 February 1973. North American culture had always fascinated him from an early time in his life.

== Career ==
In 2003, Karto worked with Kulte and moved across to LA to work with Christian Audigier. In 2005, He created and owned the jewelry brand Caption in Europe which he later sold. Over the next two years, He designed the line for Faith Connexion. Inspired by the rock and roll trend, he created jewelry that was decked out with skulls. He had collaborations with Karl Lagerfeld, Faith Connexion, Kulte and Christian Audigier Jewelry.

By 2010, Karto had reached a point where he was at a crossroads with fashion as it was something he did not understand anymore, unable to reconcile the huge levels of waste associated with designing clothes and accessories for fast fashion. When he grew tired of his Louis Vuitton Keepall bag that his mother loaned him, he made the decision to paint it. People around him seemed to respond to the piece and so he bought many similar vintage bags and took them apart, cleaned them up and swapped out some of the leather parts with sustainable pieces, added silver instead of the metal and painted objects on the side with quotes on the other to express positivity, hope and peace. This led to the creation of his namesake brand, Philip Karto.

After his move to Miami, Florida in 2013, he started a customized luxury leather goods brand where he focused his work on Louis Vuitton handbags that he transformed into pop culture inspired products in 2017. The brand has gained international recognition for its hand-painted recycled luxury bags including Louis Vuitton, Hermes and Goyard as well as luggage, and motorcycle helmets. The same year, he launched “Prohibition”, a ready-to-wear line which also follows the same principles of recycling and transformation. Miley Cyrus has been spotted with Karto’s bag along with other celebrities including Mike Tyson, Bella Hadid, Puff Daddy, Floyd Mayweather, and Cassie Ventura. Karto’s work received a notable endorsement from Forbes magazine. In an article headlined "Why Fashion Must Learn From Philip Karto’s Recycling Triumph," Forbes highlighted his contributions to sustainability in fashion, marking recognition of his talent and impact on the industry.

The recent release of 2024 Pop Art Collection highlights deconstructed and reimagined luxury staples, such as diamond-encrusted Birkins, demonstrating Karto's work for blending high fashion with popular culture influences.
