= Vampire Lovers (band) =

Australian musical group

The Vampire Lovers
- Origin: Brisbane, Queensland, Australia
- Genres: Punk rock, garage punk, horror punk, death rock
- Years active: 1982–1984, 1988–1990
- Labels: Sundown, Bent, Hecuba, Schlock Value, Magic Monster
- Past members: Axle Conrad; Shane Cooke; Dave Chamberlain; Matthew Le Noury; Brendan Kibble; Jason Shepherd; Ziggy Staten; Murray Shepherd; Brian Mann

“God. They’re so far out they’re in but what’s the point.” Audience member, The Journalists Club, Sydney, February 26th.1989

— Alexandra Billington, “Live Reviews”, 8 March 1989, p.21

The Vampire Lovers, also styled as Vampyre Lovers or Vampire Lovers, were an Australian punk rock band formed in 1982 in Brisbane, Queensland. Original band members were Axle "Axe Babe" Conrad on vocals, Brendan Kibble on guitar, Shane Cooke on bass guitar, Matt "Nasty" Le Noury on guitar and Dave Chamberlain on drums. Other members included guitarist Jason Shepherd; and drummer, Ziggy Staten. Initially the group existed from 1982 to 1984 and then reformed in 1988 to disband finally in 1990. In 1983 their first single, "Buzzsaw Popstar", brought greater recognition from the Australia alternative rock fans. In 1991 they released a mini-LP, Acid Commandos from Planet Fuzz, a year after they had disbanded.

The Vampire Lovers were a primary group behind Brisbane's third wave punk scene during 1982 to 1984. In addition, they were stylistically seen as part of the Australian approach to punk rock rather than the U.K. forms that proliferated in Australia. According to music historian, Ian McFarlane, Brisbane produced "some of the most anarchistic bands of the Australian punk rock era" and that it was a city nationally renowned for its ultra conservatism. While British fanzine journalist, Hugh Gulland, felt they were "[f]irmly rooted in The Damned / Misfits – horror punk axis" and suggested that their appeal extended to fans of garish apparel exemplified by "pink leopardskin". In a 1988 interview, the group described themselves as "Australia's only genuine death rock experience". Both Le Noury and Cooke were in Hitmen D.T.K. in Sydney during the early 1990s and recorded on some of that group's later work. In 2004, a retrospective compilation, 13 Tasteless Masterpieces, was issued by United Kingdom indie label, Magic Monster and was considered to have some really raw, crude snot.

== History ==
=== 1981–1984 ===
The Vampire Lovers, was an Australian punk rock group initially formed in 1981, after the demise of Brisbane punk rock group, The Flying Squad, (who featured Brendan Kibble and Shane Cooke). Original members, Axle "Axe Babe" Conrad on vocals, Brendan Kibble on vocals and guitar, and Shane Cooke on bass guitar had enlisted other local musicians, Matt "Nasty" Le Noury on guitar and Dave Chamberlain on drums, to complete the original line up in 1982, but Kibble quit shortly after and went on to form The Bam Balams. The Vampire Lovers named themselves after the 1970 Hammer Horror movie, of the same name. According to music historian, Ian McFarlane, Brisbane produced "some of the most anarchistic bands of the Australian punk rock era" and that it was a city nationally renowned for its ultra conservatism. Vocalist Axle Conrad suggested to Steve Bell from Time Off magazine that "You were certainly targeted if you looked different in any way. Wearing those clothes was like a badge of honour - the more you looked out there, the more gang you were, the more you perpetuated the 'us versus them' vibe."

"Rubber Sex (This way & that way)"
Garage punk twisted into a frenzied "zombie-punk-schlock vibe".

Ian Mc.Farlane regarded the Vampire Lovers as "a third-generation garage punk outfit". British fanzine, Bucketfull of Brains's journalist, Hugh Gulland, felt they were "[f]irmly rooted in The Damned / Misfits – horror punk axis" and suggested that their appeal extended to fans of garish apparel exemplified by "pink leopardskin". The Vampire Lovers' admiration for unusual or camp horror movies were expressed in many of their lyrical themes for songs. Their song,"2nd. Generation Psychopath" was a horror punk tune, originally written in 1982, that attributed homage both to the movie, "Psycho" and the song "3rd. Generation Nation" by the Dead Boys. A review by The Barman of the website I-94 Bar, described them as "[f]our young, trash movie-obsessed reprobates". Apart from the band’s obsession, the band was influenced by 1970's early punk and proto punk bands.

"Buzzsaw Popstar"
Buzzsaw Popstar, originally released in 1983 and reissued 1987.

In 1983, the group released their first extended play, Buzzsaw Popstar, on the Sundown label. "Buzzsaw Popstar", the lead track, received airplay on 4ZzZ, a local community radio station as well as charting on both the Juke Magazine Alternative Charts and RAM Magazine's Australian Indie Charts. This enabled the band to achieve greater recognition beyond their home state. Tim Yohannan from U.S. fanzine, Maximum Rocknroll, described the original E.P’s songs as garage/’77 punk with good production and its lyrics were considered to be “pretty decent” and “highly caustic”. Rob Younger (from Radio Birdman) reflected on Buzzsaw Popstar, "For what it’s worth, I think BUZZSAW POPSTAR is a masterpiece. I once (about 1988?) had to master a compilation album (At The Solicitor’s Request) of various Brisbane bands at EMI/301 in Sydney, and B P stood out by miles." In 2004, former Australian Democrats senator, Andrew Bartlett, recalled "I used to be heavily involved in 4ZZZ in the 1980s ... I saw a guy who I’m sure used to be the singer in a band called The Vampire Lovers – they did a song called 'Buzzsaw Popstar' which still sounds good today".

In July 1984, a second single followed, "Sweethearts Blown Mindless b/w Long awaited Justice", which saw them continue with their highly caustic tone, as JUKE magazine noted after being confronted with both the release of this single and the band's name. “Vampire Lovers?!! Thought I’d heard it all. Not so as these boys charge straight ahead at a hundred miles an hour, artistic temperaments”. According to The Barman it evokes the Raw Power-era Stooges with a different drummer and Lux Interior of The Cramps instead of Iggy Pop. The Big Australian Rock Book virtually concurred, claiming that the single took "initial inspiration from the likes of Radio Birdman and The Stooges".

By the second half of 1984, the group fell apart as the local punk, post-punk movement disintegrated. "Turning their back on stardom, the Vampire Lovers split in late '84, claiming to have been thwarted by 'creative differences'". The following year Le Noury on guitar and Cooke on bass guitar formed a Detroit rock-influenced group, The Four Horsemen, with Murray Shepherd (ex-Screaming Tribesmen and Fun Things) on drums and Nick Lee (The Cimmerians) on vocals. Dave Chamberlain joined the Subsonic Barflies.

=== 1987–1990 ===
During late 1987, Buzzsaw Popstar had been reissued, regained local popularity, and prompted the band to reform the following year. Conrad, Cooke and Le Noury recruited heavy metal musicians: Ziggy Staten on drums, and Jason Shepherd (younger brother of Murray Shepherd) on guitar. In November 1988 they released a single, "Heavy Planet Fuzz b/w 2nd. Generation Psychopath", for the Bent label. Brisbane's Time Off magazine analyzed the record by saying that "This third single sees the Vampire Lovers in deadly form, playing their characteristic blend of seventies garage and eighties hard edged rock and roll." In an interview, that same month, with Matthew Eaton of The Courier-Mail, they described themselves as "Australia's only genuine death rock experience".

The group had relocated to Sydney and, during 1988, started recording an EP, Weirdo Wastelands, for the United States indie label Hecuba Records, which was released the following year. Overseas signings were considered an unusual and rare achievement for Brisbane bands at the time. The songs were described by Noise for Heroes' Steve Gardner as "some kind of out of control speed metal-hardcore hybrid ... Even when it sounds metally there's a lot more effort in playing and less in posing than most metal bands, so the judges' scores are going to be pretty good on this one". A final line up change occurred in 1988 when Le Noury left to join Hitmen D.T.K. The remaining members recorded a mini-LP, Acid Commandos from Planet Fuzz, but disbanded in 1990 before its release. Cooke joined Le Noury in Hitmen DTK. In 1991 the posthumous work, Acid Commandos from Planet Fuzz, was released on Schlock Value Records.

== Legacy ==
Front album cover of the 13 Tasteless Masterpieces CD featuring a compilation of their vinyl singles and EPs. Released by independent U.K. label Magic Monster in Oct. 2004

In the mid-1980s The Vampire Lovers gained international recognition when Jello Biafra (former singer of the US hardcore punk outfit Dead Kennedys) promoted "Buzzsaw Popstar" on college radio stations. McFarlane declared "[d]espite their intermittent break-ups and infrequent gigs, The Vampire Lovers have enjoyed a cult status all the same". In October 2004 a retrospective compilation album, 13 Tasteless Masterpieces, was issued by United Kingdom indie label, Magic Monster. Jeff Dahl, (formerly of the Angry Samoans), judged the album, in the U.S. fanzine Carbon 14, to have "some really raw crude snot".

Another single was released in 2009 featuring live versions of their songs Buzzsaw Popstar and Death Dwarf originally recorded in 1988. According to I-94 Bar's The Barman, 'This in-your-face version of the single holds up well. "Death Dwarf" is a break-neck Ramone-ic derivation that lives off a spiky guitar figure. Nasty and nice. It all sounds live and unpolished but that won't worry fans. The original recording of Buzzsaw Popstar had also been included as part of the 2015 CD Compilation called "Stranded, The Chronicles of Australian Punk". This CD was a wide retrospective of Australian punk, officially released by the Australian Broadcasting Corporation's Four by Four label.

The band received a special tribute by Newstead Brewing (Brisbane) and Akasha Brewing (Sydney) in 2020 and 2021, with the release of a limited edition Red IPA blood red craft beer called “Vampyre Lovers”. The breweries acknowledged Brisbane’s renowned explosion of punk counter-culture with, ”a tip of the hat”, recognition for the Vampyre Lovers.

== Charts ==
Year	Title	Australian Alternative Singles Chart	
Year	Title	Highest Position	Weeks In
1984	"Buzzsaw Popstar"	4	10
1984	"Sweethearts Blown Mindless"	2	2
1987–1988	"Buzzsaw Popstar"	3	6

== Personnel ==
- Dave Chamberlain – drums (1982–1984)
- Axle "Axe Babe" Conrad – lead vocals (1982–1984, 1988–1990)
- Shane Cooke – bass guitar, vocals (1982–1984, 1988–1990)
- Brendan Kibble – guitar (1982)
- Matt "Nasty" Le Noury – guitar, vocals (1982–1984, 1988)
- Marty Lobotomy – drums (1983)
- Jason Shepherd – guitar (1988–1989)
- Ziggy Staten – drums (1988–1989)
- Brian Mann – guitar (1989–1990)
- Murray Shepherd – drums (1989–1990)
- Joey Mann – guitar (1990)

== Discography ==
=== Albums ===
- Acid Commandos from Planet Fuzz – Schlock Records VL001 (Mini LP, 1991)
- 13 Tasteless Masterpieces – Magic Monster (UK) (CD, October 2004)

=== Extended plays ===
- Buzzsaw Popstar – Sundown Records SUN0078 (1983) re-issue: Axe 1 (1987)
- Buzzsaw – Rubber Records (1985)
- Weirdo Wastelands – Hecuba Records (US) HEX 02 Limited numbers were pressed on green or yellow vinyl (1989)

=== Singles ===
- "Sweethearts Blown Mindless" – Rubber Records/EMI Custom Records 13598 (1984)
- "Heavy Planet Fuzz" – Bent Records Warp 008 (1988)
- "Buzzsaw Popstar and Death Dwarf" – PLAN 10 Limited numbers were pressed on green vinyl (2009)
