= Navahodads =

- Origin: Sydney, New South Wales, Australia
- Genres: Roots rock Swamp rock
- Years active: 1995 - 2003
- Labels: Pink Flamingo; Louie
- Past members: Brendan Kibble; Tim Denny; Karl Bergersen; Michael Maunsell; George Bibicos; Brad Fitzpatrick; Bill Kervin; Mark "Buzz" Busby

Navahodads were a roots rock band formed in 1995 by singer-songwriter and guitarist, Brendan Kibble, previously of The Bam Balams with Karl Bergersen on bass, Tim Denny on drums and Michael Maunsell on lead guitar. The Navahodads released two albums, Mumbo Gumbo (1995) and Madame Mojo's (1998). The band's sound was described as Texas R&B, swamp rock, soul, and rock.

Interest generated by their first album saw them tour Spain in 1996. For the tour they released a Spanish only single, "If It's Rockin' (Don't Bother Knockin')", on the Spanish label Louie Records. The band split up in 2003 when Kibble moved to the United States. The band had recorded an album's worth of new material in 2003, which to date remains unreleased. A critic summarised, "Imagine Buddy Guy on a road trip, swinging by Tony Joe White's place, calling on Doug Sahm, and they all go to party in New Orleans...that's the vibe of the Navahodads."

== Discography ==
=== Albums ===
- Mumbo Gumbo (1995), Pink Flamingo Records
- Madame Mojo's (1998), self-released

=== Single ===
- "If It's Rockin'" b/w "Funky She Devil" (1996), Pink Flamingo Records/Louie Records

=== Compilation tracks ===
- "Louie Louie", The First Louie Louie Spanish Compilation (1997), Louie Records
- "Hot Rod Hearse" and "Single Fin Theory", Surfarama (1997), Pink Flamingo Records
- "Kahanamokou Kick", Lost in the 60s - Surf Compilation (2003), Tronador

=== Band members ===
- Brendan Kibble: Vocals/Guitar - All releases
- Tim Denny: Drums - All releases
- Karl "Dogbox" Bergersen: Bass - Mumbo Gumbo, Spanish Louie Louie Album
- Michael "Pineapples" Maunsell: Guitar - Mumbo Gumbo, Spanish Louie Louie Album
- George Bibicos: Keyboards - Madame Mojo's, Spanish Louie Louie Album, Surfarama
- Brad Fitzpatrick: Guitar - Madame Mojo's, Surfarama, Lost in the 60s
- Bill Kervin: Bass - Surfarama
- Mark "Buzz" Busby: Bass - Madame Mojo's, Lost in the 60s
