= Sedgehill School =

Sedgehill Academy

Location
- Sedgehill Road; Lewisham, Greater London, SE6 3QW; England; 51.42269°N 0.02303°W

Information
- Type: Academy
- Established: 1957; Academy from 2020
- Local authority: Lewisham
- Trust: United Learning
- Department for Education URN: 148003 Tables
- Ofsted: Reports
- Headteacher: Jerome Beckley
- Gender: Co-educational
- Age range: 11–18
- Enrolment: 780 (2019)
- Capacity: 1,711
- Website: www.sedgehillacademy.org.uk

Sedgehill Academy, previously Sedgehill School, is a co-educational secondary school and sixth form located in Lewisham, London, England. As of September 2020, it is part of United Learning.

== History ==
The school opened in 1957 as a flagship campus for the new comprehensive education strategy, intended to replace the existing grammar, central and secondary modern schools. Much of the interior and fittings were avant garde and included specially designed 'Sedgehill furniture' that was later adopted by other schools run by the London County Council education department.

In 2008, the School had over 1,800 pupils with over half from ethnic minorities. The school was re-built in 15 months (while the old school was still open) by the London Borough of Lewisham. The project cost £6.3m and was carried out by Costain. The students moved into the new building in January 2009.

Ofsted visited the school in October 2013 and found it was well managed and governed but 'required improvement'. It observed that the intake was well below the national average ability, and the proportion of pupils eligible for the pupil premium, was well above average.The premium is given for looked-after children, those on free school meals and those with a parent in the armed forces. In spite of the previous interventions that Ofsted praised, the outcome metric of 5 A to C at GCSE, including maths and English, remains at 52%.

Most teachers use assessment to effectively plan and deliver lessons which are appropriate for their students. However, others didn't and too often all abilities given the same work to complete, which failed to challenge or stretch the most able students. The pace of learning varied. Some students failed make the progress that they were capable of. Teachers use a range of different strategies to help students to understand and broaden their knowledge and skills. Often students were not given enough time to think through and explore solutions for themselves, or given sufficient responsibility to independently drive their learning forwards.

Interventions were made by Lewisham Council and the parents were concerned whether these were adequate to improve pupils' results, the council was divided but support was offered from Bethnal Green Academy and Hayes School.

In June 2015 an Interim Executive Board (IEB) took control of the school, and discovered among other problems the school had a £1 million overspend. Lewisham granted the IEB permission to run a licensed deficit to be cleared by 2019/20.

In 2016 Ofsted reported:

In accordance with the Education Act 2005, Her Majesty’s Chief Inspector is of the opinion that this school requires special measures because it is failing to give its pupils an acceptable standard of education and the persons responsible for leading, managing or governing the school are not demonstrating the capacity to secure the necessary improvement in the school.

The United Learning academy trust became a 'school improvement partner', to address the longstanding criticism from Ofsted. The school then became a sister school to Lambeth Academy. This was to be for a three-year period and the school was governed by an interim executive body. The partnership was successful from the interim board's and Ofsted's point of view.

After negotiation about the PFI debt, in September 2020 the school formally converted to academy status sponsored by United Learning.

== Notable incidents ==
In 1971 the joint head of science at the school, Donnahadh O'Shea, was jailed for 12 months for possessing explosives after an explosion on a train injured a woman. He was convicted of possessing 2 lb. of nitrocellulose powder and 3,454 priming caps.

In June 2017 retired head of Modern Languages, Harvey Franks, 76, pleaded guilty to three offences of gross indecency with a boy under the age of 14. The offences took place in 1974. Franks was already serving a 15 year sentence handed to him in August 2016 for historic rape and sexual assault offences against young boys. Following the trial at Croydon Crown Court, he was sentenced in July 2017 to a further two years in prison.

An assistant headteacher, Patrick Stack, was found hanged in an outbuilding in the school grounds in 2001. He had been suffering from depression. He had been awarded the MBE for his outstanding contribution to education in the Queen's birthday honours for 2000.

== Notable former pupils ==
- Django Bates, composer, multi-instrumentalist, band leader and educator
- Nicholas Bennett, politician
- Jim Dowd, politician
- Aminata Kabba, singer and songwriter
- Chris Kibble, pianist and keyboard player
- Alan Lancaster, co-founder, bassist and vocalist in Status Quo
- Anne Mensah, broadcasting executive
- Moses Odubajo, professional footballer
- Francis Rossi, co-founder, lead guitarist and vocalist in Status Quo
- Moses Boyd, British jazz drummer, composer, producer
- Young Adz, rapper
