= Bam Balams =

Australian rock band

- Origin: Sydney, New South Wales, Australia
- Genres: Rock 'n' roll, R&B, blues, rockabilly, country, pop
- Years active: 1984–1992
- Labels: Citadel, Green Fez, Pink Flamingo
- Past members: Brendan Kibble; Steve Cole; Brad Fitzpatrick; Matt Manchester; Amr Z. Abdallah; Steve Carlin; Warren Elford; Joe Breen; Ian "The Reverend" Little; Greg Marchant; Dave Castellari; Tim Denny; Terry Stanley

Bam Balams were an Australian rock band which formed in 1984 and disbanded in 1992. They were led by singer-songwriter and guitarist, Brendan "Wig" Kibble (ex-Vampire Lovers). The group issued one album, Genuine Rock & Roll Medicine Show (Green Fez, 1988), an EP and six singles. Their records did well in the Australian independent charts but they did not appear on the ARIA Charts. They toured nationally but did not perform overseas.

== History ==
Bam Balams were formed in Sydney in April 1984 with the line-up of Brendan "Wig" Kibble (ex-Vampire Lovers) on lead vocals and guitar; Dave Stead on guitar and backing vocals; Steve Cole on bass guitar and backing vocals; and Matt Manchester on drums, backing vocals. Dave Stead left the band in 1985, and was replaced by Brad Fitzpatrick. The group got their name from a track on Supersnazz (1969) by the Flamin' Groovies, and are referred to as Bambas by fans. Their influences included Gene Vincent, Johnny Burnette, Tony Joe White, Creedence Clearwater Revival, The Byrds, Buck Owens and The Standells.

The band released their first two singles, "Deliver My Love" (December 1985) and "No-One Else" (June 1986), on Citadel Records with Rob Younger (ex-member of Radio Birdman) producing. Also in 1986 they released "Same Old Tune", as a split single with September Gurls' "Precious" on Guiding Light Records as a give-away with Adventure #2 magazine in Denmark. In 1987, the original line up split up (Fitzpatrick, Cole, and Manchester went on to form The Hexbreakers, who cut a single 'Faraway Years' for Green Fez Records).Kibble formed a second line-up in 1987 with Amr Z. Abdallah (later of ARIA No 1 chart toppers Ratcat) on bass guitar, Steve Carlin on guitar, and Warren Elford on drums, which recorded a single, "Surfin' in the Swamp" (March 1988), for Citadel Record's Green Fez label.

Soon after a third line-up formed, with Kibble and Abdallah joined by Ian "The Reverend" Little (ex-Grooveyard) on guitar and Joe Breen (Coupe DeVille) on drums, they recorded the group's one album, Genuine Rock & Roll Medicine Show (December 1988) and its lead single, "Wheel of Fortune" (November). Greg Marchant replaced Abdallah on bass guitar in 1989 (Abdallah left the band to join Ratcat), and this line-up recorded the single, "Hellfire" (November 1989). Dave Castellari replaced Marchant later that year, and they recorded a 12" extended play, 45 RPM Extended Play, with the track "10,000 Miles (A España)" on Pink Flamingo Records. The group provided the lead track, "Munster Rock'n'Roller", for the 1990 Munster Records compilation, Munster Dance Hall Favourites Vol III. In 1990, the line-up changed again with Terry Stanley on bass guitar, and Tim Denny on drums, they remained until the band split in 1992. The gained popularity overseas including Spain, France and Italy; but they had never toured outside Australia.

According to Australian musicologist, Ian McFarlane, "[w]hile many of their Sydney-based contemporaries exploited Detroit-inspired hard rock, ... 1960s acid-punk ... or 1960s psychedelia", Bam Balams played a mix of garage rock, swamp rock-swamp pop, R&B, rockabilly, jangle pop and 1950s-1960s style country music. Their records did well on the Australian independent charts but they did not appear on the ARIA Charts. Kibble formed the Navahodads in 1995, which played swampy R&B, Country, and Rock n Roll, they released two albums and toured overseas.

== Discography ==
Releases:

=== Albums ===
- Genuine Rock & Roll Medicine Show (Green Fez) December 1988

=== Extended plays ===
- 45 RPM Extended Play ("10,000 Miles (A España)") (Pink Flamingo Records) 1989

=== Singles ===
- "Deliver My Love" b/w "Mean Thang" (Citadel Records) 1985 (produced by Rob Younger)
- "No-One Else" b/w "Gettin' Over You" (Citadel Records) 1986 (produced by Rob Younger)
- "Same Old Tune", split single with September Gurls' "Precious" (Guiding Light Records) 1986
- "Surfin' in the Swamp" b/w "Fire in My Soul" (Green Fez) 1987
- "Wheel of Fortune" b/w "Rock It to the Moon" (Green Fez) 1988
- "Hellfire" b/w "Hold on Me" (Green Fez) 1989

=== Compilation tracks ===
- "Munster Rock n Roller" - Munster Dance Hall Favourites Vol III (Munster Records) 1990
