= Spring 2004 Dior couture collection =

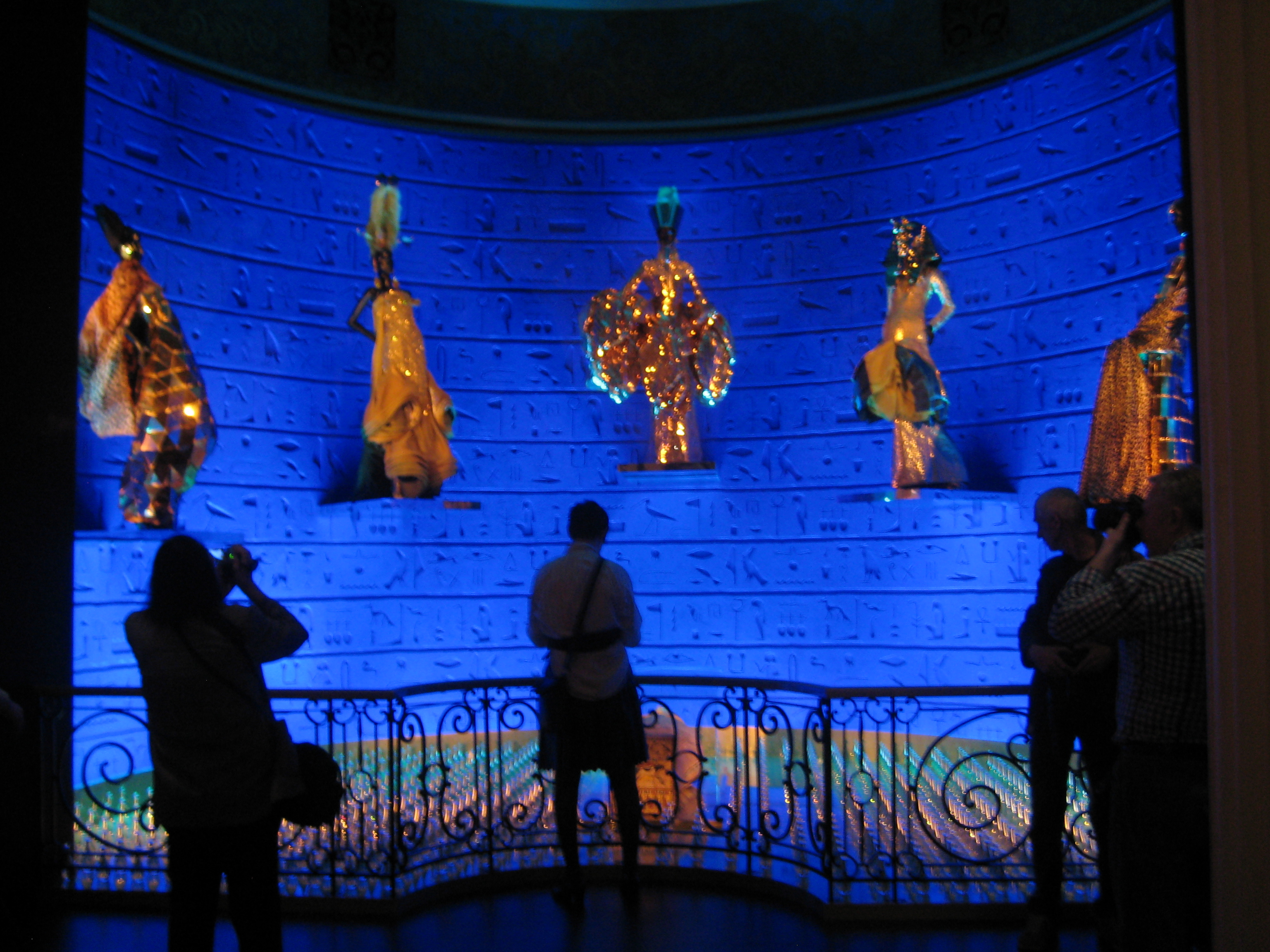

The Spring-Summer 2004 Christian Dior haute couture collection was designed by John Galliano and presented on January 19, 2004, in Paris. It was inspired by Galliano's then recent travels to Egypt. (Ethnic influences are often prominent in Galliano's work.) The collection was one of Galliano's most celebrated collections for Dior.

The collection included leopard-print fur stoles with collars that "soar like obelisks", billowing gowns of shadow-dyed organza, with hems twisted and folded into lotus flower shapes, and pyramid-shaped gowns made of dozens of golden mirrors, and printed with hieroglyphics, or the glamorous mummies paraded in bandages of black silk tulle flashing with rainbow sequins. Many wore Nefertiti-like crowns, or long Egyptian "goatees". The models wore breast-plates of turquoise, coral, silver and gold, and earrings the size of "eagles' eggs". All models were outfitted in corsets. The models wore carved and polished wood masks, of Tutenkhamun, or gods like Horus, a falcon, Bast, a cat, or Anubis, a jackal. The masks were made by London milliner Stephen Jones.

Models in the show included Britain's Erin O'Connor, who opened the collection, Brazil's Raquel Zimmermann and Caroline Trentini, Sudan-born Alek Wek, the Dutch Yfke Sturm and the Czech Karolína Kurková, who closed the collection.
