= Kibbles =

Kibbles may refer to:

- dog food as in Kibbles 'n Bits
- cat food
- Kibble (disambiguation) (numerous meanings)
