= Brendan Kibble =

Australian musician (born 1963)

Brendan Kibble a.k.a. "Wig" (born 16 October 1963) is an Australian singer, songwriter, and guitarist. He is best known for his work with Australian bands The Bam Balams and Navahodads and the American bands The Texreys and The Go Wows.

== Musical history ==
Kibble's first bands were the Brisbane punk rock outfits Alphabet Children (1979–80) (vocals), Flying Squad (1980–81) (vocals, guitar), Vampire Lovers (1981) (guitar) and The Horde (1982) (vocals, guitar).

After playing in The Horde, in 1983 he briefly played guitar in a line up of the Brisbane band The Headstones.

In 1984 Kibble left Brisbane for Sydney, where he formed the Bam Balams , who released an album, an EP, and six singles. The Bam Balams split in 1992.

Over the next few years, he acted as producer for several Pyramidiacs records: the "Krunch!" EP (1993), the "Solo Una Vez" EP (1993) and the All You Want LP (1994) (which he also played guitar on).

In 1994 he started playing live again, in the band Surry Hills 2010, who took rock'n'roll songs and played them in full country/honky tonk style. Later in 1994, Kibble teamed up with Chris Flynn (ex The Headstones, The Dubrovniks) and they formed Motorhank. This band took country songs (mainly Hank Williams tunes) and played them in a hard rock style.

In 1995 Kibble and Motorhank's bass player Karl Dogbox formed the Navahodads. The band released two albums, a single, and had tracks on compilation albums.

In 2002–03, Kibble played guitar in a band fronted by Rob Younger, the Nanker Phelge, playing 1960s British Invasion, beat, and r&b covers.

The Navahodads split up in 2003, and Kibble moved to Austin, Texas, from 2007 to 2011 he fronted The Texreys a Garage rock band. The Texreys released one album. From 2012 to 2015 he fronted Power Pop/Rock band The Go Wows, who released two albums.

== Discography ==
The Bam Balams

Singles:

"Deliver My Love" b/w "Mean Thang" (Citadel Records) 1985

"No-One Else" b/w "Gettin' Over You" (Citadel Records) 1986

"Same Old Tune", split single with September Gurls' "Precious" (Guiding Light Records) 1986

"Surfin' in the Swamp" b/w "Fire in My Soul" (Green Fez) 1987

"Wheel of Fortune" b/w "Rock It to the Moon" (Green Fez) 1988

"Hellfire" b/w "Hold on Me" (Green Fez) 1989

EP:

45 RPM Extended Play ("10,000 Miles A España") (Pink Flamingo Records) 1989

Album:

Genuine Rock & Roll Medicine Show (Green Fez) 1988

Compilation Tracks:

"Munster Rock n Roller" – Munster Dance Hall Favourites Vol III (Munster Records) 1990

The Navahodads

Single:

"If It's Rockin'" b/w "Funky She Devil" (Louie Records) 1996

Albums:

Mumbo Gumbo (Pink Flamingo Records) 1995

Madame Mojo's (Self-released) 1998

Compilation Tracks:

"Louie Louie", Spanish Louie Louie Album (Louie Records) 1996

"Hot Rod Hearse" and "Single Fin Theory", Surfarama (Pink Flamingo Records) 1997

"Kahanamokou Kick", Lost in the 60s – Surf Compilation (Tronador Records) 2003

The Texreys

Album:

Cave Girl (Ugh ! Records) 2008

The Go Wows

Albums:

The Go Wows (Self-released) 2013

Gimme Some Fun (Pop Detective Records) 2015
