= George Kibble =

English cricketer

George Herbert Kibble (9 October 1865 – 4 January 1923) was an English cricketer who played in one first-class cricket match for Kent County Cricket Club during the 1889 season. He was born in Greenwich in 1865 and died in Camberwell in London in 1923 aged 57.

Kibble's only first-class appearance came in Kent's County Match against Lancashire in June 1889.

== Bibliography ==
- Carlaw, Derek (2020). Kent County Cricketers, A to Z: Part One (1806–1914) (PDF). Cardiff: ACS.
