= George Kibbler =

English rugby league footballer

Personal information
- Full name: George Kibbler
- Born: c. first ¼ 1900; Leeds, England
- Died: c. 2 December 1929 (aged 29); Leeds General Infirmary, Leeds, England

Playing information
- Position: Second-row
Club
Years	Team	Pld	T	G	FG	P
1920–27	Leeds	136	22	2	0	70
1927–28	Huddersfield
1928–29	Bradford Northern	4	0	0	0	0
	Total	140	22	2	0	70
Representative
Years	Team	Pld	T	G	FG	P
1925	Yorkshire	1	0	0	0	0

George Kibbler (c. first ¼ 1900 – c. 2 December 1929) was an English professional rugby league footballer who played in the 1920s. He played at representative level for Yorkshire, and at club level for Buslingthorpe Vale ARLFC, Leeds, Huddersfield and Bradford Northern, as a second-row. At the time of his death from stomach trouble he lived at 4 Cox Hill Street (off Buslingthorpe Lane, Leeds).
