= Animal print =

Print made to resemble the pattern of the skin and fur of an animal

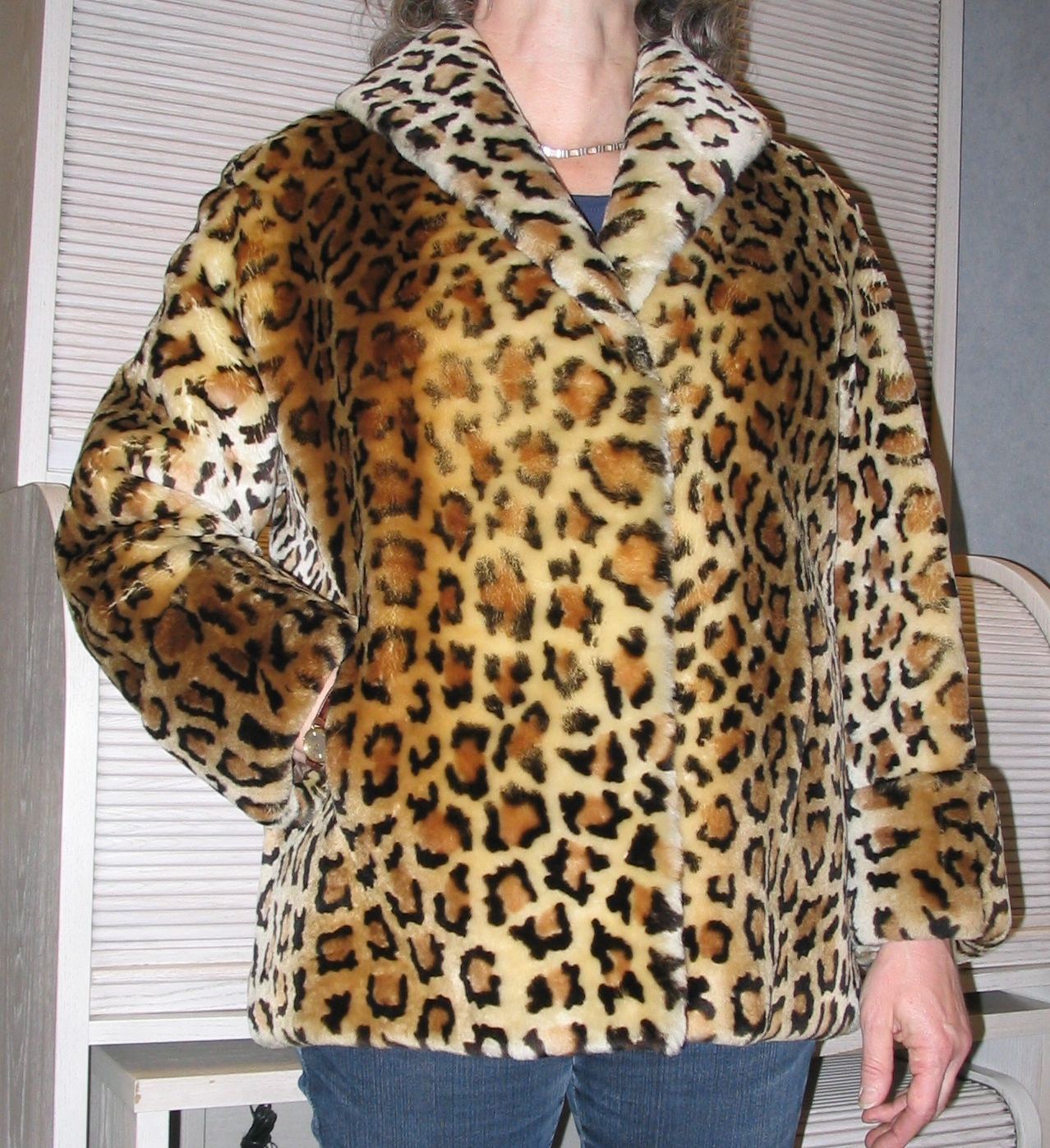
A leopard print jacket

Animal print is a clothing and fashion style in which the garment is made to resemble the pattern of the skin and fur, feathers or scales of animals such as a jaguar, leopard, snow leopard, cheetah, zebra, giraffe, snake, clouded leopard, tiger or cow. Animal print is also used for room decoration, handbags, and footwear, and even some jewelry. A major difference between animal prints and fur clothing is that animal prints today very often use fake fur instead of animal coat.

== History ==
Animal prints have long been a popular style for many reasons. For one, they are generally expensive and considered rather exotic; hence they are a symbol of wealth and status. Throughout history, kings and other high people, extending as far back as ancient Egyptian times whose priests and pharaohs had been depicted having used animal print clothes and rugs and such as a sign of status, just as mounted animals are kept as trophies. Animal print became popular for women in the United States in the late 1960s during the Bohemian movement.

== Leopard print in rock culture ==
One of the earliest images for the use of leopard print being used as part of clothing in rock music was of Jerry Lee Lewis during the 1950s, who wore a suit jacket with lapels, cuffs and pocket flaps made from a leopard print type of material. This suit was copied by Australian rock and roller, Johnny O'Keefe, who was also known to wear brightly colored clothing, including tiger stripes, on stage in the 1950s rock ’n’ roll era.

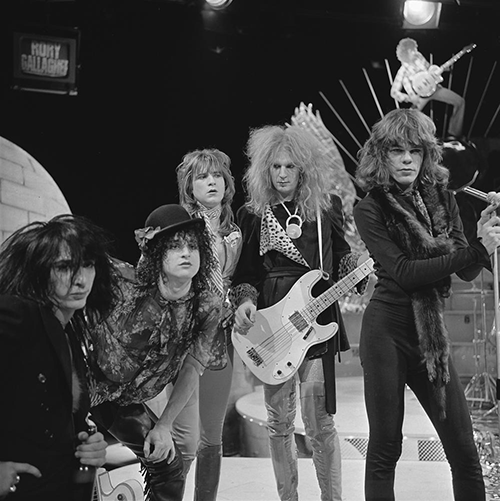
New York Dolls member Arthur Kane second on right wearing leopard print in 1973

During the 1970s and early 1980s some rock musicians wore leopard print as part their attire. Early 1970s glam rock artists would wear the design as an expression of flamboyance and a challenge to cultural expectations. Artists such as Rod Stewart, Keith Richards and Iggy Pop all have been attributed wearing leopard print clothing at some point in time in the seventies. A photograph by Mick Rock, taken in 1972, featured Iggy Pop on the back sleeve of the 1973 album cover of Raw Power wearing a black jacket with a cheetah head and leopard print trim stretched along the jacket's shoulders, sleeves and front.

The Punk subculture and its adherents throughout the late seventies and early eighties also engaged in the use of leopard print. According to the Museum of Youth Culture in the UK, Leopard print was a means for punk rockers to convey a subversive visual message and was aimed to garner negative reactions from mainstream society. There was a clear distinction between the glam rock's male embrace of the feminine and punk's ideas of trashy bad taste and a symbol of rebellion. Whilst the leopard print design was popular amongst some musicians during the Seventies and Eighties, its history stems further back to the 1920s and 1930s Art Deco period when it was seen as part of high fashion. The 1950 film, Sunset Boulevard, starred faded silent film actress of the 1920s, Norma Desmond (played by Gloria Swanson), who wore an outfit with leopard print trim and owned a 1929 Isotta Fraschini Tipo 8A0 Castagna Landaulet which was lavishly decked out with leopard print over the vintage car seats and interior. Leopard print reached the heights of the catwalk in 1947 when Christian Dior released his ’New Look’ collection. In turn, the punk rabble made a complete reversal of the cultural elite hierarchical assumptions and transformed it into tacky or tasteless fashion, some fifty years later.

== Other uses ==
Besides a distinctive natural animal pattern on clothing, "animal prints" may also refer to art prints of animals, printed on canvas or paper. The art prints may replicate the same skin or fur pattern found on the animal, but a flat photographic representation printed on artistic media, such as for as wall decorations. The prints are not limited to just the animal's skin or fur pattern, but may be any part of the animal and still be called an animal print.

Animal print applications extend beyond clothing and art prints and are commonly used for other decorations, including rugs, wallpaper, or painted surfaces. In addition, animal prints may be used in designs for race cars, airplanes, signage, building exteriors, or safety gear such as helmets the NFL team, Cincinnati Bengals, uses.

== See also ==
- Fake fur
- Fur clothing
- Fur coat
