= Chris Kibble =

British pianist and keyboard player (born 1963)

Chris Kibble (born 24 July 1963) is a British pianist and keyboard player. He started with the jazz fusion band Kafo in 1985, then joined acid jazz band Snowboy. Kibble attended Sedgehill Secondary School in southeast London, England.

He has worked with Robin Jones Latin Jazz Sextet, Ricardo de Santos, Charlie Palmieri, Pucho & His Latin Soul Brothers, Gordon Smith, Fuzz Against Junk, Terry Callier, Don Rendell, and King Salsa.

Since 2008, Kibble has been a member of the Screened Music Network.

== Discography ==
=== As sideman ===
With Terry Callier

- 2001 Alive
- 2002 Speak Your Peace
- 2003 Total Recall
- 2005 Live in Berlin
- 2005 Lookin' Out

With others

- 1994 Elegant Slumming, M People
- 1996 Descarga Mambito, Snowboy
- 1996 Something's Coming, Snowboy
- 2014 Seven Steps to Heaven, Robin Jones
- 2018 Robots, Charlotte Glasson
