= Trash culture =

Artistic or entertainment expressions considered of low cultural profile

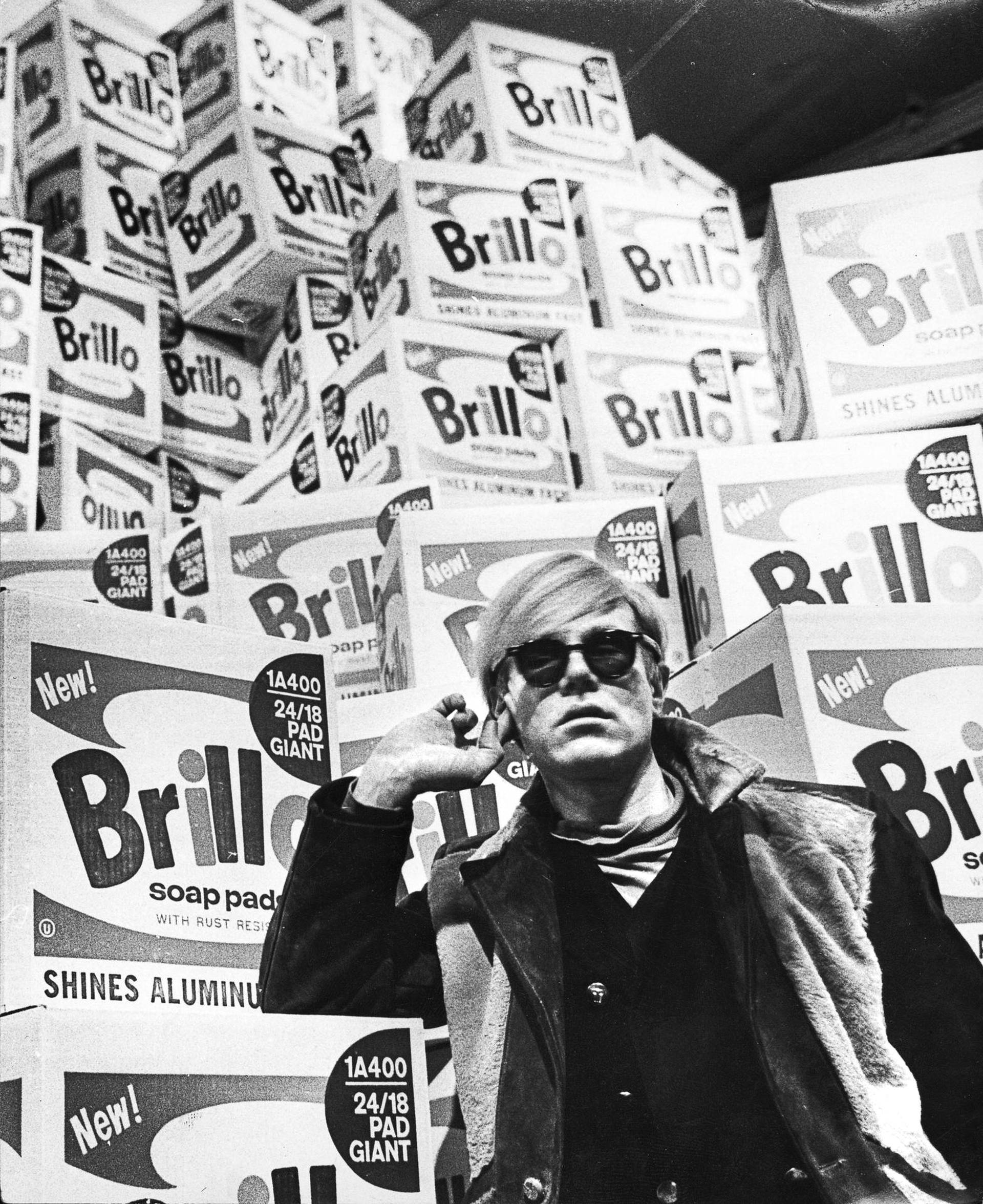
Andy Warhol at Moderna Museet, Stockholm, with his Brillo Box sculptures in the background, 1968. The Brillo Boxes, which replicate supermarket packaging as art, challenge traditional notions of art and consumerism, making them emblematic of trash culture.

Trash culture is a broad category of artistic or entertainment expressions perceived as having a low cultural profile but attempting to have mass appeal. It encompasses media such as books, films, television shows, local events, and music often criticized for their perceived lack of cultural value, reliance on sensationalism, and focus on commercial success. Emerging from the margins of mainstream culture, trash culture thrives on provocation and transgression.

The term, which gained prominence in Western discourse during the 1980s, is often used pejoratively to dismiss material considered vulgar or in poor taste. However, some scholars and critics argue that trash culture offers valuable insights into societal norms, consumer habits, and identity, reflecting the tastes and behaviors of broader audiences.

== Characteristics ==
Trash culture is characterized by sensationalism, exaggerated themes, and consumer-oriented production. It often appeals to voyeuristic tendencies, with its content shaped to attract audiences through provocative or low-quality material. The term is commonly contrasted with "kitsch," which is tied more closely to artistic endeavors but also involves commercial and consumerist influences.

Trash culture exists at the intersection of wealth and the lack thereof, embodying both excess and scarcity in diverse ways. Trash culture often reflects the conspicuous consumption associated with wealth, such as flashy, over-the-top displays of luxury, as well as emerging from resourcefulness and the repurposing of what people may deem disposable, often tied to lower-income communities where creativity thrives amid constraints. This duality reveals a cultural commentary on class dynamics, where the wealthy may appropriate "trashy" aesthetics as ironic statements, while those with limited means may be compelled to embrace or transform these elements out of necessity.

Although trash culture and kitsch share certain overlaps, kitsch often emphasizes aesthetics and imitation of high culture, while trash culture focuses more on accessibility and shock value.

== Influence on popular media and art ==
Trash culture is seen as an evolution of consumer behavior, initially associated with lower socioeconomic classes but now permeating all levels of society. It has influenced modern entertainment, such as reality television, tabloid journalism, and pulp fiction, by prioritizing mass appeal over artistic or intellectual merit.

=== Literature ===
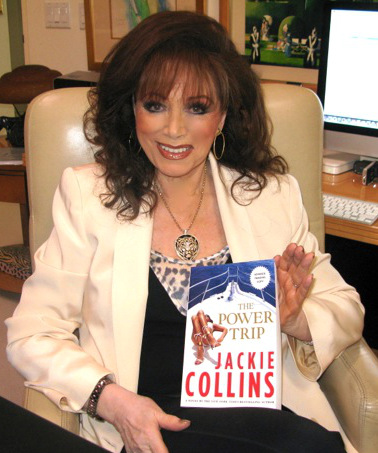
Bestselling author Jackie Collins has been referred to as the "Queen of Trash Lit."

Trash literature refers to written works often considered formulaic or aimed purely at commercial success, such as bestselling romance novels, celebrity gossip magazines, and sensationalist tabloids; such works prioritize sensationalism, melodrama, and provocative themes to captivate readers. Critics argue that trash literature serves as modern adaptations of classic literary themes, reframing them within consumer-driven contexts. Authors like Jackie Collins, dubbed the "Queen of Trash Lit," became synonymous with the genre through her bestselling novels filled with glamour, scandal, and intrigue.

Though often dismissed for lacking artistic merit, trash literature has significantly influenced popular culture and shaped genre fiction.

==== Chick lit ====
The rise of chick lit in the late 20th century contributed to the evolution of trash literature, blending mass-market appeal with humor and relatable storytelling. Chick lit, often aimed at women readers, features humorous and lighthearted stories about modern relationships, career challenges, and personal growth. Works like Helen Fielding’s Bridget Jones's Diary, Sophie Kinsella’s Confessions of a Shopaholic, and Lauren Weisberger’s The Devil Wears Prada exemplify the genre, exploring themes of navigating work, romance, and personal identity. Other notable examples include Emily Giffin’s Something Borrowed, Candace Bushnell’s Sex and the City, and Jennifer Weiner’s Good in Bed, which have expanded the genre's scope and popularity.

Despite its commercial success, chick lit has faced criticism for perpetuating stereotypes and focusing narrowly on middle-class, white, heterosexual women's experiences. However, its proponents argue that the genre provides a valuable space for exploring contemporary struggles, such as balancing independence with societal expectations, and for celebrating female empowerment and friendship.

==== Pulp magazines ====
Pulp fiction, emerging in the early 20th century, continued the sensational storytelling of 19th-century penny dreadfuls and dime novels, offering crime, romance, and science fiction tales on cheap wood pulp paper. Exploitation pulp fiction thrived on sensationalism, delving into provocative themes such as sex, crime, and social deviance to attract readers with its lurid and accessible style. Subgenres like lesbian and gay pulp fiction explored the lives and relationships of queer people, blending sensationalism with subversive representation to provide visibility in a society that largely marginalized them. Some subgenres of pulp fiction, such as the Stalags, still continue to be controversial.

Many renowned authors began their careers in pulp magazines, including Ray Bradbury, known for his visionary science fiction; Dashiell Hammett, whose hardboiled detective stories like The Maltese Falcon redefined crime fiction; H.P. Lovecraft, who introduced readers to the chilling cosmic horror of the Cthulhu Mythos; and Robert E. Howard, the creator of the enduring sword-and-sorcery hero Conan the Barbarian.

==== Erotica ====
Erotic literature, sometimes referred to as erotica or smut literature, is a subgenre of trash literature that has a long and complex history, blending cultural taboos, human desire, and literary exploration. Ancient texts like the Song of Songs in the Hebrew Bible, Kama Sutra in India, and Apuleius's The Golden Ass combined erotic themes with cultural and philosophical insights, illustrating the timeless nature of the genre. During the Renaissance and Enlightenment, works such as Pietro Aretino’s Sonetti Lussuriosi, John Cleland’s Fanny Hill, and the scandalous novels of the Marquis de Sade pushed societal boundaries, exploring themes of moral transgression, sexual liberation, and power dynamics.

Erotic literature has often intersected with censorship and underground movements. In the Victorian era, it thrived in clandestine publishing, while the 20th century saw a shift as the sexual revolution legitimized its exploration. Writers like Anaïs Nin and Henry Miller infused the genre with literary sophistication, presenting sexuality as a vital aspect of human experience. Subgenres like BDSM literature emerged with texts such as Sade’s Justine and Leopold von Sacher-Masoch’s Venus in Furs, evolving over time to include feminist and queer perspectives from authors like Pat Califia and Anne Rice. The rise of the internet further democratized the genre, enabling broader access and the proliferation of diverse voices. Erotic fan fiction continues to be a popular subgenre.

Despite its literary evolution, erotic literature retains its place within trash culture through its sensationalist elements, mass-market appeal, and ability to provoke and entertain. While works like E.L. James's Fifty Shades of Grey brought unprecedented visibility to the genre, they also sparked debates about representation and commercialization, highlighting the ongoing tension between art, taboo, and popular culture. Erotic literature, in its many forms, continues to challenge conventions, explore identity, and redefine the boundaries of taste and literary value.

=== TV ===
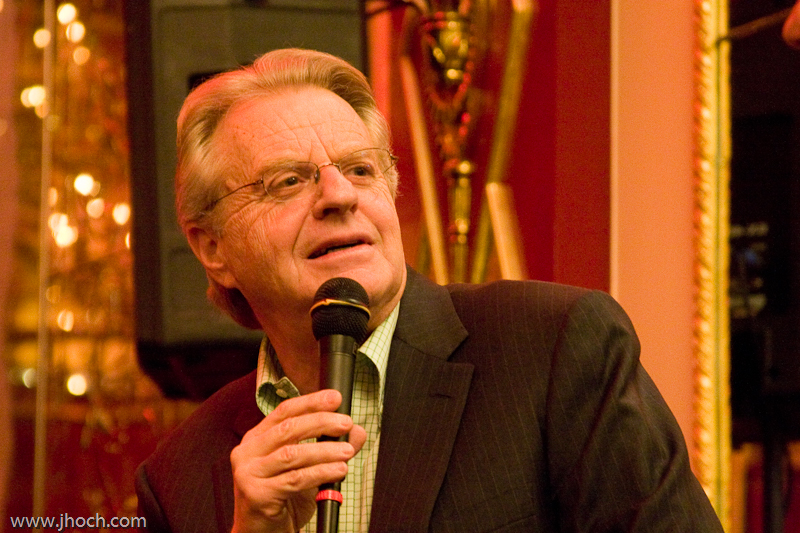
The Jerry Springer Show has been described as a symbol of "trash TV."

Trash TV refers to television programming that relies on sensationalist and provocative content to attract viewers. Often derided as lowbrow, it emerged prominently in the 1980s with the proliferation of private broadcasting channels. Programs such as the tabloid talk shows The Jerry Springer Show and Dr. Phil exemplify this genre, focusing on exaggerated conflicts and shock value to draw large audiences.

Docusoaps such as Keeping Up with the Kardashians, The Real Housewives and Vanderpump Rules are often described as guilty-pleasure trash TV.

Critics often target scripted reality formats and reality TV shows, such as Big Brother or I'm a Celebrity...Get Me Out of Here!, which are accused of fostering voyeurism and shock-factor.

These shows often draw criticism from politicians, religious institutions, media regulators, and even advertisers.

The television series Mystery Science Theater 3000 has played a significant role in popularizing trash films, which are commonly associated with American cinema, rooted in drive-ins, grindhouse theaters, and exploitation genres.

=== Film ===
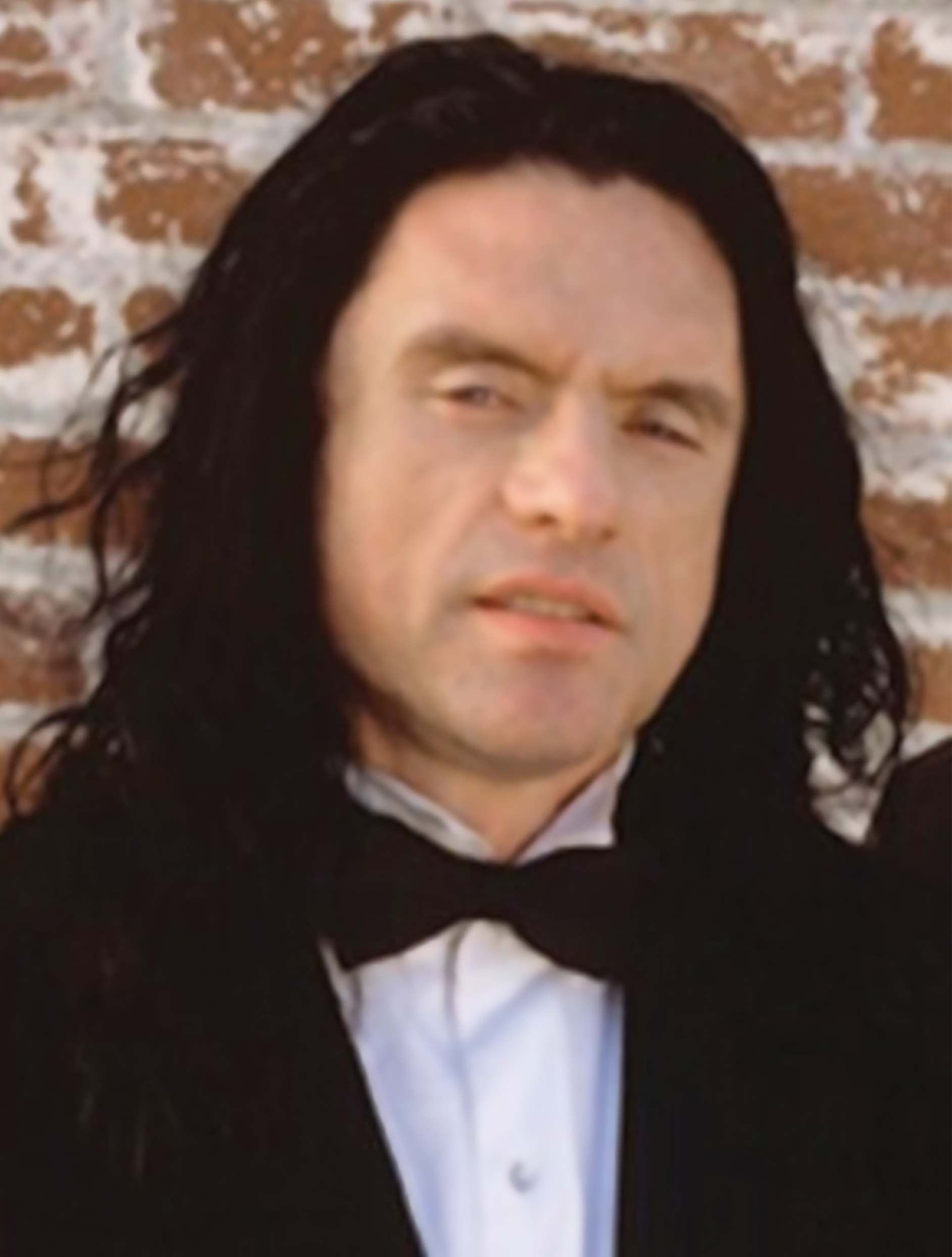
Tommy Wiseau, director and actor of the film The Room

Trash films, often categorized as "B-movies, C-movies", "Z-movies", "exploitation films", or "cult classics", range widely in budget, embracing unpolished aesthetics and provocative content to celebrate imperfection, blur the line between art and kitsch, and offer a raw, subversive alternative to mainstream cinema. Exploitation films encompass a wide range of subgenres, including sexploitation, which emphasizes nudity and sexual themes; blaxploitation, featuring African American protagonists and cultural themes often set in urban environments; nunsploitation and Nazisploitation, which exploit religious and historical taboos; cannibal films, centered on graphic depictions of survivalist horror and indigenous stereotypes; women-in-prison films, focusing on themes of incarceration and female resilience; revenge films, where protagonists seek violent justice; hicksploitation, portraying rural or Southern stereotypes; and mondo films, blending documentary-style filmmaking with shocking or exotic content.

Pop artist Andy Warhol's early experimental films Blow Job (1964), Taylor Mead's Ass (1964), and My Hustler (1965) directly confronted male sexuality and homosexuality. His later films in collaboration with Paul Morrissey moved toward narrative filmmaking. Together they produced a trilogy of films—Flesh (1968), Trash (1970), and Heat (1972)—that combined explicit sexual themes, drug use, and elements of underground culture.

Directors like Russ Meyer, known for over-the-top satires like Faster, Pussycat! Kill! Kill! (1965), and John Waters, the "Pope of Trash," who created Pink Flamingos (1972), pushed boundaries of taste and decency to create works that shocked and delighted. Trash films often embrace rebellion, excess, and taboo, offering a counter-narrative to polished Hollywood narratives. John Waters' 1980 satirical movie, Polyester, included an innovative scratch 'n' sniff card, called "Odarama", that had various smells both good and bad to entice movie goers and enhance the movie spectacle.

The Rocky Horror Picture Show (1975) celebrated queer identity and sexual liberation, becoming a cornerstone of midnight movie culture, while Glen or Glenda (1953), directed by Ed Wood, tackled issues of gender identity and societal norms. Wood's Plan 9 from Outer Space (1957), often cited as one of the worst films ever made, and Tommy Wiseau's The Room (2003) achieved cult classic status for their "so bad it's good" charm, with Wiseau's filmmaking journey chronicled in the award-winning biopic The Disaster Artist (2017). Other notable examples include Lloyd Kaufman’s The Toxic Avenger (1984), Class of Nuke 'Em High (1986), TerrorVision (1986), Killer Klowns from Outer Space (1988), Sharknado (2013), VelociPastor (2018), and Birdemic: Shock and Terror (2010), which gained cult followings for their outrageous premises and unpolished execution.

Handbill of a punk party featuring the Vampire Lovers (band) held on the 11th. of August 1984. The band’s obsession for the "cheap 'n' nasty" horror films are reflected in their imagery.

Meanwhile, Sam Raimi's The Evil Dead (1981), with its innovative low-budget horror effects and relentless energy, exemplifies the creativity that thrives outside mainstream constraints. Australian punk rock group Vampire Lovers were a trash culture themed band that immersed themselves with contemporary B-grade horror movies, such as The Evil Dead and The Toxic Avenger. This was reflected by their lyrics and polarizing attitude that upset numerous individuals in their hometown of Brisbane, as well as catching many of their audience off-guard.

The term "trash" can be polarizing—some see it as implying artistic limitations, while others view it as a badge of freedom from conventional filmmaking standards. Many trash films have been reappraised as influential works, with modern auteurs like Quentin Tarantino, Robert Rodriguez, Harmony Korine, and Sean Baker openly celebrating their exploitation film roots.

==== Superhero films ====
Superhero films, particularly those within the Marvel Cinematic Universe (MCU), are often associated with "trash culture" due to their perceived formulaic storytelling, reliance on CGI spectacle, and prioritization of commercial success over artistic innovation. Critics argue that these films saturate the market, reduce cinema to franchise-driven blockbusters, and cater to mass audiences at the expense of deeper thematic exploration or aesthetic originality.

The Deadpool films, with their irreverent humor, self-aware commentary, gratuitous violence, and subversion of superhero tropes, are frequently cited as examples of trash culture.

==== Teen comedy and parody films ====
Teen comedy and parody films are closely tied to the concept of trash culture, celebrated for their exaggerated stereotypes, crude humor, and unapologetically lowbrow appeal. These genres reached their zenith in the 2000s, a decade defined by their dominance in mainstream cinema. Teen comedies like American Pie, Superbad, Mean Girls, and 10 Things I Hate About You explored adolescent experiences with a mix of raunchy humor, coming-of-age drama, and exaggerated depictions of high school life, cementing their cultural impact. Meanwhile, parody films such as Scary Movie, Not Another Teen Movie, Epic Movie, and Date Movie thrived by satirizing popular genres and cultural trends, often with absurd, irreverent, and intentionally crass humor.

==== Pornographic parodies ====
Unofficial pornographic parodies of major motion pictures are a recurring phenomenon in the adult entertainment industry, reimagining iconic characters and stories in sexualized contexts to attract audiences through satire and cultural familiarity. These low-budget productions often rely on parody protections to navigate copyright laws, though lawsuits have occasionally arisen. A prominent example is Pirates (2005), inspired by Pirates of the Caribbean: The Curse of the Black Pearl, which features high production values, elaborate costumes, and detailed sets, making it a rare exception in pornographic filmmaking.

=== Fashion ===
==== Trashy clothing ====
"Trashy" clothing refers to attire that is often considered provocative, overly revealing, or designed to attract attention in a way deemed bold or lacking refinement. It typically includes revealing cuts, exaggerated fits, excessive embellishments, provocative graphics, or designs that prioritize shock value over subtlety. Often associated with stereotypes or subcultures, this style challenges conventional fashion norms and is influenced by cultural and societal biases. While some view it as tasteless or inappropriate, others see it as empowering or expressive, highlighting the subjective nature of the term. Context plays a significant role, as outfits perceived as "trashy" in one setting may be celebrated in another, such as festivals or nightclubs.

==== High fashion ====
High fashion frequently draws on trash culture, reimagining elements once considered vulgar or disposable into bold, luxurious statements. Fashion houses like Alexander McQueen, Issey Miyake, John Galliano, Moschino and Balenciaga have incorporated motifs such as ripped fabrics, exaggerated silhouettes, and even the aesthetic of trash bags, blurring the lines between luxury and everyday life. By transforming the mundane and discarded into high-end creations, these designers challenge traditional notions of beauty and critique consumerism, often turning the appearance of the cheap or overlooked into coveted, expensive items. While this fusion celebrates individuality and imperfection, it also raises questions about cultural appropriation, as these elements are often stripped of their original context and repackaged for elite audiences.

Balenciaga’s $1,790 “Trash Pouch,” a calfskin leather bag inspired by garbage bags and available in black, white, yellow, and blue, debuted in the Fall 2022 collection, sparking viral reactions ranging from outrage to amusement, with creative director Demna calling it “the most expensive trash bag in the world.”

=== Art ===
In visual arts, artists use trash and cheap mass-produced materials as the basis for collages and sculptures. These works often convey a subtext critical of society, capitalism, or consumerism. Early pioneers integrating waste and material remnants into their art include Georges Braque, Pablo Picasso, and the Dadaists. In the early 20th century, the Parisian Nouveau Réalistes and the American "Junk art" movement created works exclusively from waste materials to provoke the established art market. The Bavarian performance and TrashArt artist ADLER A.F., who calls herself the "Trash-Queen", showcased her socially critical Trash performances prominently in 2011 at the Venice Biennale in the German Pavilion and at Documenta 13 in Kassel.

==== Pop art ====
Pop art, both a celebration and critique of popular culture, drew from advertisements, comic strips, and mass media to blur the boundaries between high and low art. Artists like Andy Warhol, Roy Lichtenstein, and Richard Hamilton elevated consumer imagery into the realm of fine art, questioning the boundaries between high and low culture. Andy Warhol, a key figure in the movement, transformed mundane consumer items like Campbell's Soup Cans and Coca-Cola bottles into cultural icons, redefining artistic value. Fascinated by the discarded and overlooked, Warhol turned everyday waste—empty cans, stamps, and papers—into art. His work included silk-screen prints of Marilyn Monroe, capturing the allure and commodification of fame, alongside haunting depictions of car crashes, reflecting society's obsession with tragedy and spectacle.

==== Street art ====
Street art, a direct descendant of trash culture, transforms walls, alleyways, and underpasses into canvases, rejecting the exclusivity of traditional galleries to create raw, unapologetic expressions that speak to people in their everyday environments. Often transient and battling time, weather, and authorities, street art draws from trash culture through stencils, stickers, wheat-paste posters, and spray paint—accessible, immediate tools that democratize creation. Its themes span political activism, social commentary, personal expression, and surreal whimsy, with artists like Banksy bringing it into mainstream consciousness while preserving its subversive edge.

== Society ==
Trash culture encompasses marginalized and sensationalized elements dismissed as lacking substance or value, thriving on extremes that provoke, entertain, and challenge conventional norms. The concept of "junk" is also a part of trash culture, representing items or ideas perceived as disposable, excessive, or low-value. Junk food epitomizes this, celebrated for its indulgence but critiqued for its lack of nutrition, while the term "junkies" reflects society's blend of fascination and stigma toward addiction, often sensationalized in media. Trash talk is a form of boastful, insulting, or provocative speech intended to intimidate, humiliate, or unsettle an opponent, often used in competitive contexts such as sports or gaming. Toilet humor is a type of off-color humor dealing with bodily waste.

=== Internet culture ===
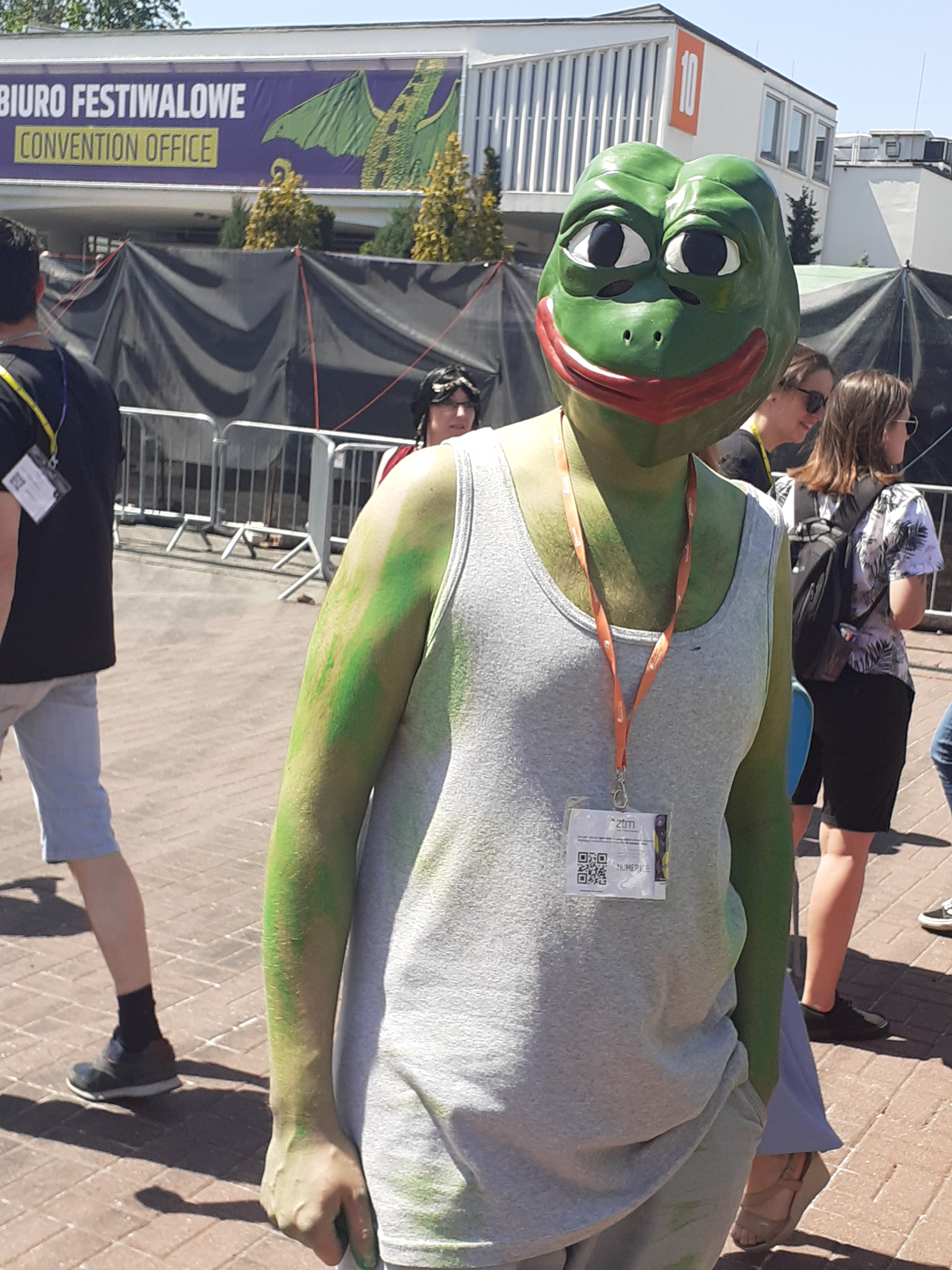
A person dressed as Pepe the Frog, a character known from internet memes.

Memes, as a part of internet culture, embody trash culture through their humor, absurdity, and accessibility, blending social commentary with lowbrow aesthetics. By recycling images and using exaggerated humor, they shape participatory and cultural dialogues, reflecting the broader internet culture's embrace of the outrageous, ironic, and deliberately lowbrow. Meme culture exemplifies this with its rapid proliferation of absurd, crude, and sometimes offensive humor, as seen in trends like "deep-fried" memes, the absurdity of "Shrekposting", and viral formats like the "Sigma grindset" parody.

AI slop has become widespread on social media, with the 'Shrimp Jesus' meme gaining traction as a surreal example, some of these developments being colloquially labelled "brainrot". Spam accounts, boosted by bot followers, flood timelines with feel-good stories to drive traffic to low-quality sites.

Platforms like TikTok and YouTube amplify trash culture through viral challenges, including the "Cinnamon Challenge" or "Mukbang" videos, where excess and spectacle are central themes. Communities such as Reddit’s r/trashy and 4chan actively share niche, shocking, or deliberately cringeworthy content, often laced with irony or satire. "Stan" culture, particularly on Twitter and Tumblr, leans into trash culture by exaggerating adoration of celebrities through fan edits or memes that parody their public personas, turning them into exaggerated archetypes. A trash-stream is a type of live broadcast where the host engages in shocking, dangerous, or humiliating acts, often for monetary donations from viewers. Additionally, reality TV-inspired drama, including public online feuds or staged "cancellation" controversies, mirrors the sensationalism and spectacle-driven focus of trash culture.

=== Regional variations ===
Every country has its own regional variations on trash culture, reflecting local identities and stereotypes; these variations manifest in distinct expressions of fashion, music, and art, often shaped by both local economic conditions and global influences.

==== White trash ====
The term "white trash" has historically been used as a derogatory label to describe poor, rural white communities in the United States, often associated with stereotypes of ignorance, laziness, and lack of sophistication. Closely related are the cultural identities of "trailer trash", "redneck" and "hillbilly," which share similar roots in rural, working-class traditions but with distinct regional nuances. Rednecks are often tied to Southern rural pride, agriculture, and a rugged, self-reliant ethos, while hillbillies are more associated with Appalachian regions, folk traditions, and stereotypes of isolation.

Over time, "white trash," along with redneck and hillbilly identities, has been appropriated and recontextualized in various aspects of pop culture, contributing to the broader concept of trash culture. In media and entertainment, these labels often manifest in the form of characters or stories that celebrate or satirize the lives of working-class whites, such as in TV shows like The Jerry Springer Show or films like Joe Dirt. These portrayals frequently highlight themes of rebellion, excess, and vulgarity, aligning with the provocations of trash culture as a whole. Additionally, works like Deliverance and The Beverly Hillbillies reflect different facets of redneck and hillbilly stereotypes, often blending satire with cultural commentary.

==== Eurotrash ====
"Eurotrash" refers to a subset of trash culture characterized by a flamboyant, often campy celebration of excess, decadence, and kitsch aesthetics, primarily associated with European pop culture of the late 20th century. The terms "Nouveau riche", "New Russians", and "Parvenu" are closely related, as they all describe individuals who have recently acquired wealth and social status, often accompanied by a perception of lacking the sophistication or traditions of established elites. The term "Eurotrash" is often used to describe a mix of glitzy, over-the-top fashion, gaudy nightlife, and eccentric personalities, blending elements of high society and lowbrow entertainment. It is commonly linked to Eurodance music, cheesy B-movies, and bold, risqué visual styles often seen in fashion magazines or European variety shows.

==== Chav ====
Chav culture, a subculture often associated with working-class youth in the UK, is deeply intertwined with trash culture through its embrace of conspicuous consumerism, stereotypical fashion, and anti-establishment attitudes. Chavs are often recognized by their love for branded sportswear, flashy jewelry, and a particular lifestyle that prioritizes materialism and visible status. This overt display of wealth, often achieved through low-income means, mirrors trash culture's rejection of high society's norms and its celebration of excess, vulgarity, and rebellion.

==== Zef ====
Zef culture, popularized by the South African group Die Antwoord, is a subculture that embraces trash culture by celebrating lowbrow aesthetics, vulgarity, and excess. With its roots in working-class South Africa, zef culture reclaims terms like "cheap" and "tacky" as expressions of pride. It blends elements of punk, hip-hop, and kitsch to challenge mainstream notions of taste and class, much like trash culture's embrace of the provocative and the taboo. Through humor and shock value, zef culture critiques societal norms, making it a distinctive part of the broader trash culture movement.

==== Gopnik ====
Gopnik culture, associated with working-class youth in post-Soviet countries, shares many traits with trash culture, particularly in its embrace of lowbrow aesthetics, rebellion, and the rejection of societal norms. Characterized by Adidas tracksuits, squatting in public spaces, hardbass music and a taste for cheap alcohol, gopniks often embody a rough, rebellious lifestyle that challenges mainstream values. Much like trash culture, gopnik culture embraces stereotypes and revels in the "low" and the "unsophisticated," finding pride in what is often deemed vulgar or uncouth.

==== Bogan ====
In Australia, the term "Bogan" refers to a working-class subculture characterized by a love for muscle cars, beer, and flannel shirts. Often associated with rural and suburban areas, bogans embrace a loud and unapologetic lifestyle that challenges societal norms of sophistication and taste. The aesthetic frequently includes mullet hairstyles, Southern Cross tattoos, and a preference for hard rock or heavy metal music. Although initially a derogatory term, "bogan" has been reclaimed by many as a badge of pride, celebrating individuality and a carefree attitude.

==== Naco ====
In Mexico, "Naco" refers to an urban working-class identity often linked to kitschy fashion, excessive jewelry, and vibrant colors. Once used pejoratively to describe bad taste or lack of sophistication, the term has been redefined by some as a celebration of authenticity and cultural pride. Naco culture embraces slang, flashy cars, and reggaeton music, embodying a rejection of elitist norms and a love for ostentatious self-expression.

==== Favelado ====
In Brazil, "Favelado" refers to individuals from the favelas, or urban slums, and their associated culture, which often blends vibrant street fashion, funk music, and a spirit of resilience. Favelado culture is deeply rooted in the socioeconomic struggles of Brazil's urban poor, with an aesthetic that celebrates creativity and survival in the face of adversity. Funk carioca, a music genre originating from the favelas, is a significant cultural export that amplifies the voices of marginalized communities.

== Trash vs. kitsch ==
Trash and kitsch share a complex relationship, as both challenge traditional notions of value and taste, yet they do so in distinctly different ways. Trash often embraces rawness, imperfection, and subversion, using its unpolished nature to critique societal norms or artistic conventions. In contrast, kitsch leans into sentimentality, exaggeration, and superficial charm, seeking to evoke comfort or nostalgia through idealized representations.
