= Kulte =

French clothing brand

Kulte is a clothing label from Marseille. It was created in 1998 and in 2013 it owns more than 10 shops mainly in France (its first foreign shop opened in Athens in 2011). The brand collaborated with several artists (MGMT, Naïve New Beaters) and music related organizations (including the music festivals, Marsatac and Transmusicales, and record labels, Because Music and Kitsuné). After Kulte was bought by one of the biggest French clothing labels, Kaporal, in 2016, the two brands are working together.
Kulte founder Matthieu Gamet is Président of the Maison méditerranéenne des métiers de la mode.
