= Living Eyes (Radio Birdman album) =

Studio album by Radio Birdman
- Released: 1981
- Recorded: 1978
- Studio: Rockfield Studios, Wales
- Genre: Punk rock; hard rock
- Length: 33:11
- Label: WEA
- Producer: Deniz Tek

Radio Birdman chronology
Radios Appear (1977)	Living Eyes (1981)	Zeno Beach (2006)

Living Eyes was the second studio album released by Sydney, Australia punk rock band Radio Birdman. It was the last recorded album by the band as they split up shortly after it was recorded in 1978. The album was recorded over a three-week period at the Rockfield Studios in Wales whilst the band was on its first overseas tour, supporting the Flamin' Groovies around Britain and Europe. The original master tapes disappeared before the album was released and as a result the album was mastered from a cassette recording of trial mixes, which impacted on the sound quality. Living Eyes sound was heavily influenced by the lead guitarist and producer Deniz Tek who had lived in Detroit before moving to Australia and been influenced musically by the "Motor City Rock" sound. The music of Birdman has been compared to that of The Stooges and MC5, but their sound is also comparable to that of 60's rock 'n' roll bands such as The Rolling Stones.

"Smith and Wesson Blues", "I-94" and "Burned My Eye" had all been previously released on the Burn My Eye EP, but were re-recorded for the album.

18 songs were recorded at Rockfield, with 13 songs making the album. Pip Hoyle's instrumental "Alien Skies" was considered out of step with the other music, and "Didn’t Tell The Man" had been released by The Hitmen in 1979. Tek later said that Seymour Stein was largely responsible for the delay in release. He said, "To me, it was already recorded. The expense had already been put into it. So there was no reason for his attitude and we wanted to have it out because we were proud of it. It was 'Yeah, Dennis, I agree it should come out. You've got my word on it.' Then nothing happens."

In 1995, John Foy (Red Eye Records) retrieved the original master tapes from Rockfield Studios and the band had the songs remixed, remastered and re-sequenced. The remastered version of Living Eyes was issued in 2005 on Red Eye (through Polygram).

== Reception ==
Reviewed at the time of release, Roadrunner said the album was, "less of a total blitz," than their previous work, "with perhaps more contrasts and definite attempts at greater tonal variation." "Crying Sun" was described as a "killer track," and "Do the Moving Change" a "pop classic."

== Track listing ==
=== 1981 original ===
All songs written by Deniz Tek, except where noted.

1. "More Fun"
2. "TPBR Combo" (Tek, Chris Masuak)
3. "455 SD"
4. "Do The Movin' Change"
5. "I-94"
6. "Iskender Time"
7. "Burn My Eye '78"
8. "Time to Fall"
9. "Smith and Wesson Blues"
10. "Crying Sun" (Tek, Warwick Gilbert)
11. "Breaks My Heart"
12. "Alone in the Endzone"
13. "Hanging On"

=== 1995 Reassembled, remastered and re-mixed version ===
1. "Hanging On"
2. "455 SD"
3. "Do The Movin' Change"
4. "TPBR Combo"
5. "I-94"
6. "Iskender Time"
7. "Burn My Eye '78"
8. "Alien Skies"
9. "Time to Fall"
10. "Smith and Wesson Blues"
11. "Crying Sun"
12. "If I Wanted To"
13. "Breaks My Heart"
14. "More Fun"
15. "Alone in the Endzone"
16. "Didn't Tell the Man"
17. "Dark Surprise"

(Bonus-CD in 2015 edition with More Fun! EP)

== Charts ==
Chart (1981)	Peak position
Australia (Kent Music Report)	55

== Personnel ==
Radio Birdman

- Warwick Gilbert - bass
- Ron Keeley - drums
- Pip Hoyle - organ, piano
- Chris Masuak - guitar, percussion, harmony vocals
- Deniz Tek - guitar, harmony vocals
- Rob Younger - lead vocals

== See also ==
- Proto-punk
