= New Christs =

Australian garage rock band

The New Christs
- Origin: Sydney, New South Wales, Australia
- Genres: Garage rock, garage punk
- Years active: 1980–1981, 1983–1984, 1987–1990, 1992–2001, 2006–present
- Labels: Green, Blue Mosque/Festival, Citadel, Lance Rock, Laughing Outlaw
- Members: Rob Younger; Jim Dickson; Dave Kettley; Brent Williams; Paul Larsen
- Past members: see Members

The New Christs are an Australian garage rock band formed in 1980 by founding mainstay, Rob Younger, on lead vocals. Younger was the lead singer for punk rockers, Radio Birdman, and in other hard rock groups, New Race, Bad Music, the Other Side, Nanker Phelge, and Deep Reduction. The New Christs line-up since 2011 is Younger with Jim Dickson on bass guitar, Dave Kettley on guitar, Paul Larsen on drums and Brent Williams on guitar and keyboards. Over their career the group have issued five studio albums, Distemper (1989), Lower Yourself (1997), We Got This! (2002), Gloria (2009) and Incantations (2014). Three former members have died: Stevie Plunder in January 1996, Mark Wilkinson in December 2012 and Christian Houllemare in June 2014.

== 1980–1981 ==
The New Christs were formed early in 1980 in Sydney as a hard rock group with Clyde Bramley on bass guitar (ex-The Hitmen, Other Side), Bruce 'Cub' Callaway on guitar (ex-X-Men, Saints), John Hoey on keyboards (ex-X-Men), Don McGloneon on drums (ex-Bedhogs) and Rob Younger on lead vocals (ex-Radio Birdman, Other Side). This line up never performed live but they released a single, "Face a New God", in August 1981, which was produced by Callaway for Green Records. The track was co-written by Callaway and Younger. Australian musicologist, Ian McFarlane, described it as "searing acid-punk" which has "since emerged as one of the most collectable artefacts of the Australian punk/new wave era." They disbanded later that year.

== 1983–1984 ==
The New Christs reformed in June 1983 with Younger joined by Chris Masuak on guitar, Mark Kingsmill on drums and Tony Robertson on bass guitar (all from The Hitmen) and Kent Steedman on guitar (also in the Celibate Rifles). They supported an Australian tour by Iggy Pop and then Steedman returned to the Celibate Rifles. Younger kept the band going with Richard Jakimyszyn as a replacement on guitar (ex-Lime Spiders). They issued two singles, "Like a Curse" (April 1984) and "Born out of Time" (April 1986), on Citadel Records, which were written and produced by Younger. McFarlane felt they were "consummate, guitar-driven, hard rock". AllMusic's Jack Rabid reviewed "Like a Curse", as being "more slam-bang rock with great rhythm from a man who has it coursing in his bones." The group's music was used on the soundtrack of the feature film, Going Down (1982). This line-up broke up in May 1984.

== 1987–1990, 1991 ==
Another version of the New Christs were assembled in February 1987: with Younger were Louis Burdett on drums (ex-Powerhouse, Ed Kuepper Band), Jim Dickson on bass guitar (ex-Railroad Gin, Survivors, Passengers, Barracudas) and Charlie Owen on lead guitar (ex-Tango Bravo). Burdett was soon replaced on drums by Nick Fisher (ex-Wet Taxis, Paris Green). This line up released four singles, "The Black Hole" (July 1987), "Dropping Like Flies'" (December), "Headin' South" (November 1988) and "Another Sin" (June 1989). A four-track extended play, Detritus, was issued as a compilation in 1987 for the United Kingdom and United States markets. It was followed in 1988 by an Australian compilation album, Divine Rites, which collected five singles from Citadel Records.

The group's first studio album appeared in August 1989, Distemper, which McFarlane opined was "explosive" and "remains the definitive statement on the band's sound and style. It contained a wealth of powerful tracks." Penelope Layland of The Canberra Times declared it to be "good, aggressive music, full of hate, even if it has all been done before... All in all a good album. Play it as a substitute for clobbering someone." In June 2008 Dylan Lewis described it as "A non-stop ride of terrific songs full of melody and power offset the bleak, venomous lyrics. The tension the musicians create in each track is spine tingling. It's an exhausting album to listen to. To my ears, it stands as the greatest, raging Australian rock'n'roll album." It reached No. 1 on the ARIA Alternative Albums Chart. They toured Australia and undertook two tours of Europe (1988, 1989). The band split up in February 1990 but briefly reformed in 1991 to support Ramones at a gig in Sydney.

== 1992–2001 ==
Younger established the next version of New Christs in January 1992 with Billy Gibson on guitar and organ (ex-Eastern Dark), Greg Hitchcock on guitar (ex-The Neptunes, Kryptonics), Christian Houllemare on bass guitar (ex-Happy Hate Me Nots), Peter Kelly on drums (ex-Flies, No Man's Land, Vanilla Chainsaws) and Stevie Plunder on guitar (ex-The Plunderers). Hitchcock soon left to join the Boom Babies and, in September 1992, Plunder formed the Whitlams and was replaced by Tony Harper (ex-Viscounts, Voodoo Lust). Another four-track EP, Pedestal, was released in October 1994. In 1995 Mark Wilkinson (ex-Girlies, Lime Spiders) replaced Gibson on piano and guitar. Younger, Harper, Houllemare, Kelly and Wilkinson line-up were recorded on a seven-track EP, Woe Betide (November 1995), which was produced by Younger. A Canadian label, Lance Rock Records, issued a compilation album, Born out of Time (1996), which McFarlane described as "13 tracks of prime New Christs aural mayhem." Younger felt it contained "the songs I can still stand."

The New Christs were temporarily put on hold in early 1996 while Younger toured with a reformed, Radio Birdman. The New Christs resumed by mid-year and released their second studio album, Lower Yourself (early 1997), produced by Younger. Lauren Zoric of Rolling Stone explained that it is "Propelled by tough, inventive riffs and glorious rock & roll grooves, occasional keyboards now infiltrate the make up. Harnessing and driving the band's considerable power, Younger is ever on the brink of immolation, expressing a diseased soul, wracked by the compromises and humiliations of love. Long may we revel in his purgatory." An extended version included a bonus four-track EP. The group toured Australia and then, in April 1997, Europe with Al Creed on guitar and vocals (ex-Fruitworld, Hey Charger!), who replaced Harper.

They disbanded in 2001 and posthumously released a 2× CD studio album, We Got This!, in 2002, which was produced by Wayne Connolly. Online webzine, Oz Music Project's Pants noticed that "The crux of this album though is the incredible vibrancy and individuality of the songs, each track rocking hard but having its own identity and personality, yet amazingly intertwining such emotion into each track." I-94 Bar's Simon Li felt that "Younger is in some of his best vocal form on this CDLP, as the band responds the best way they can; solid and continually menacing." Fellow reviewer John McPharlin notice "there is a remarkable consistency of vision, intent and achievement across the whole album. Not for a single moment on any of these tracks does this sound like a band that had run its race, dropped the ball, hit bottom, lost the plot, shot its load and/or was about to tear itself apart." Ahead of its appearance Younger declared that it would be the last album from his group.

Also in 2002, Citadel Records issued another compilation album, These Rags, using remixed versions of two earlier EPs, Pedestal and Woe Betide. Three members of the 1990s line-up have died: Stevie Plunder in January 1996, Mark Wilkinson in December 2012 and Christian Houllemare in June 2014.

== 2006–present ==
In May 2006 Younger displayed another New Christs line-up: Jim Dickson on bass guitar, Dave Kettley on guitar (Shifter, The Dead Set, Radio Birdman), Brent Williams on guitar and keyboards, and Stu Wilson on drums. The Barman of I-94 Bar website caught their gig in May in Wollongong, where they played "a Greatest Hits package with none of the new songs from the Younger canon... A solid hit-out by a new line-up with versatility and style... Europe's going to be in for a fine old time." In May and June that year the group performed in Spain – including at the Primavera Sound in Barcelona, an eclectic annual festival specialised in independent music – France, Germany and Belgium. They subsequently toured Europe four more times (2008, 2009, 2011, 2014). In January 2008 Younger told Patrick of Mess+Noise website that he disputes providing a lasting legacy, "I think much of that [perceived influence] is born of hindsight... Sure, we had some degree of influence because so many people have told me over the years they started their group after hearing us. That’s how I got started, hearing other groups, except it was via the records of the New York Dolls and the Stooges, because the local groups were so vapid rather than inspiring."

The group's fifth studio album, Gloria, was released in May 2009. Jeff Glorfeld of The Age rated it at three out of five. The Barman described it as "the most low key-sounding New Christs album in the canon. Production was an exercise in economic rationalism – live crowds are small and labels with cash to burn are thin on the ground – and much of what resulted from an earlier session was scrapped." In that same year they played at the Azkena Rock Festival in Spain.

In 2011 Wilson was replaced by Paul Larsen (also with The Celibate Rifles). Dominique Genot of I-94 Bar reviewed the group's live album, Live 2011, which is "[as] live as you hope to see them (and I did during the 2011 Euro tour). The record was done at the Excelsior Hotel's closing night in Sydney in May, and the thing was quickly mixed by guitarist-keyboardist Brent Williams. The album's got a big sound, with Dave Kettley's guitar high in the ears. My personal criticisms is that Rob Younger's voice is too low in the mix - also i think there are a few cuts between the songs."

This line-up issued their sixth studio album, Incantations, in June 2014. Gus Ironside of Louder Than War rated it as 9 out of 10 and felt it was "a highly melodic album, packed with hooks and insidious tunes, it's a tightly-coiled brute, as claustrophobically dense with detail as it is outright rocking."

== Members ==
Current line-up

- Rob Younger – vocals
- Jim Dickson – bass
- Dave Kettley (Shifter, The Dead Set, Radio Birdman) – guitar
- Brent Williams (Zambian Goatherders) – guitar, keyboards
- Stu Wilson – drums
- Paul Larsen (aka Paul Loughhead) (The Celibate Rifles) – drums (replaced Wilson in 2011)

Previous line-ups

1980–81

- Rob Younger – vocals
- Clyde Bramley (The Hoodoo Gurus) – bass
- Bruce "Cub" Callaway (The Saints) – guitar
- John Hoey – keyboards
- Don McGlone – drums
- Ken Doyle – drums (appeared on the single)

1983–84

- Rob Younger – vocals
- Chris Masuak (The Hitmen, Radio Birdman) – guitar
- Mark Kingsmill (The Hellcats, The Hitmen, The Hoodoo Gurus) – drums
- Tony Robertson (The Hitmen) – bass
- Kent Steedman (The Celibate Rifles) – guitar
- Richard Jakimyszyn (Lime Spiders, The Hitmen, Molten Universe) – guitar (replaced Steedman)

1987–90, 1991

- Rob Younger – vocals
- Charlie Owen – guitar
- Jim Dickson (Railroad Gin, The Survivors, The Barracudas, The Passengers, Deniz Tek Group, Radio Birdman) – bass
- Louis Burdett – drums
- Nick Fisher – drums

1992–2001

- Rob Younger – vocals
- Bill Gibson (Hellmen, The Eastern Dark, Pyramidiacs, Loose Pills) – guitar
- Greg Hitchcock – guitar (left in 1992)
- Christian Houllemare (The Someloves, Happy Hate Me Nots) – bass
- Stevie Plunder (The Plunderers, The Whitlams) – guitar
- Peter Kelly (Flies, Vanilla Chainsaws, No Man's Land) – drums
- Tony Harper (Voodoo Lust) – guitar (replaced Plunder)
- Mark Wilkinson (Lime Spiders, The Girlies – guitar (replaced Gibson)
- Al Creed (Aberration, The Panadolls, Hell Crab City) – guitar (replaced Harper)
- Nik Rieth (Celibate Rifles, Brother Brick, Tumbleweed) – drums (replaced Kelly)
- Stu Wilson – drums (replaced Reith)

== Discography ==
=== Albums ===
- Distemper (1989) – Citadel
- Lower Yourself (1997) – Citadel
- We Got This! (2002) – Laughing Outlaw
- Gloria (May 2009) – Impedance
- Incantations (2014) – Impedance

=== Extended plays ===
- Pedestal (October 1994) – Lance Rock
- Woe Betide (November 1995) – Lance Rock

=== Live albums ===
- Live 2011 (2011) – Self-released. Recorded live at the Excelsior Hotel, Sydney, Australia, 7 May 2011.
- Live (2014) – Pitshark

=== Compilations ===
- Detritus (EP, 1987) – What Goes On
- Divine Rites (1988) – Citadel
- Born Out of Time (1995) – Lance Rock
- These Rags (2002) – Citadel

=== Singles ===
- "Waiting World" / "Face a New God" (1981) – Green
- "Like a Curse" / "Sun God" (1984) – Citadel
- "Born Out of Time" / "No Next Time" (1986) – Citadel
- "The Black Hole" / "Addiction" (1987) – Citadel
- "Dropping Like Flies" / "Dead Girl" / "I Swear" / "You'll Never Catch My Wave" (1987) – Citadel
- "Headin' South" / "I Saw God" (1988) – Citadel
- "Another Sin" / "The Burning of Rome" (1989) – Citadel
- "I Swear" (live) / "The Black Hole" (live) (1989) – Romilar-D
- "Groovy Times" / "On Top of Me" (2000) – Munster
- "Bonsoir à Vous" / "Animalisation" (2009) – Pitshark
- "The Ledge" / "Meanwhile" (2011) – Pitshark
