= The Hitmen =

Australian rock band

- Also known as: Johnny and the Hitmen; Hitmen DTK
- Origin: Sydney, New South Wales, Australia
- Genres: Hard rock; punk rock; indie rock
- Years active: 1977–1984; 1989–1992; 2007–present
- Labels: WEA; RCA; ABC; Survival; Zeus; Savage Beat / Shock
- Members: Johnny Kannis; Tony "the Kid" Robertson; Murray Shepherd; Tony Jukic; Vince Cuscuna; Malcolm Paynter (Honorary Member)
- Past members: see Members

The Hitmen are an Australian hard rock band formed in November 1977 by long-term members, Johnny Kannis on lead vocals and Chris Masuak on lead guitar as Johnny and the Hitmen. The group went through numerous line up changes in its first run from 1977 to 1984. They regrouped under a new name, Hitmen DTK, between 1989 and 1992. They have issued three studio albums, Hitmen (July 1981), It Is What It Is (November 1982) and Moronic Inferno (November 1991). The Hitmen reformed in 2007; Masuak left in 2015.

== History ==
=== 1977–1983: early years, Hitmen and It Is What it Is ===
The Hitmen were formed in November 1977 in Sydney by Warwick Gilbert to maintain the core unit of Radio Birdman and its fan base during Deniz Tek's absences from RB. The line-up was Charlie Georgees on guitar (ex-Hellcats), Warwick Gilbert on bass guitar (also in Radio Birdman), Johnny Kannis on lead vocals, Ron Keeley on drums and Chris Masuak on lead guitar (both also in Radio Birdman). Kannis and Masuak had been bandmates in the Jackals from 1974 to 1975 alongside Rubin Acosta, Archie Archilles, Alf Azzopardi and Steve Willman.

According to Kannis, the Jackals were "a school band that Chris Masuak and I started while we were in year 10 [with a] Maltese rhythm section." They played cover versions of material by Aerosmith, Alice Cooper, Blue Öyster Cult, Ted Nugent, Lou Reed and original country rock tracks written by Masuak, including "Death by the Gun". Masuak joined Sydney-based punk rockers Radio Birdman in October 1976 alongside Gilbert and Keeley. Kannis was that group's MC and he formed the new group, as Johnny and the Hitmen, "for a series of fun gigs" between Radio Birdman commitments.

Radio Birdman started a European tour early in 1978, and Kannis formed a new line-up of Johnny and the Hitmen with Georgees, Clyde Bramley on bass guitar, Alan Brown on drums, Steve Harris on keyboards, Angie Pepper on vocals and Lynne Phillips on vocals. Prior to Radio Birdman's European tour Johnny Kannis recorded three tracks with Radio Birdman members Ron Keeley, Warwick Gilbert and Chris Masuak plus Charlie Georges at Trafalgar Studios and released two as a solo Johnny Kannis 7" single, "King of the Surf" backed by a cover version of the Drifters' 1964 single, "Under the Boardwalk", as Kannis' solo effort in November 1978. Following the demise of Radio Birdman, Kannis and Masuak reformed the Hitmen in July '78 with Ivor Hay on drums (ex-the Saints) and Phil Sommerville on bass guitar. In September Gilbert was asked join on guitar.

The Hitmen were signed to WEA in March 1979 and released their debut single, "Didn't Tell the Man", in July of that year. By that time Hay was replaced by Geoff Peterkin (ex-Ol' 55) until August when Mark Kingsmill joined on drums (ex-the Hellcats, the Other Side). Soon after Sommerville left, Gilbert switched back to bass guitar and Tony Vidale joined on guitar. A second single, "I Want You", appeared in March 1980.

In December 1980 the band entered the studio to record their debut self-titled album, which was released in the following July, with Mark Opitz as producer (AC/DC, the Angels, the Reels). Vidale had been replaced on guitar by Brad Shepherd (ex-Fun Things, 31st) during the recording sessions – Shepherd re-recorded the guitar parts. Susan Moore of The Australian Women's Weekly described the group as "keeping the riotous rock flag flying with a crystal clear production... The songs are well-crafted although it's the overall onslaught that's the most memorable; the direction is decisive and determined. And there's a lucid layering of instrumentation – each component rubbing shoulders comfortably." Australian musicologist, Ian McFarlane, opined that the album and lead single, "I Don't Mind" (June 1981), were "excellent slices of melodic hard rock. Opitz had achieved a full-throated production sound in the studio that did justice to the band's fierce live reputation."

Whilst signed to WEA and MMA management the group toured with international acts Tom Petty and the Heartbreakers, The Stranglers and Steppenwolf. Conflict of direction prior to the debut LP's release prompted WEA to withdraw promotion for its release and drop the band from the label, which led to Gilbert's departure from the band in 1981. Gilbert was replaced by Tony Robertson (ex-Credits, Wasted Daze, 31st). Early in 1982 the group left WEA and signed to RCA Records: they released their second album, It Is What It Is (November 1982), which was produced by Bruce Brown and Russell Dunlop. Shepherd had already left, a month earlier, to join Hoodoo Gurus and the Hitmen continued as a quartet. According to McFarlane "[they] continued to draw big crowds on tour, but could not sell records. Consequently, RCA dropped The Hitmen and the band went into hibernation."

When Iggy Pop toured Australia in June 1983, Radio Birdman's singer, Rob Younger, was asked to provide his opening act. Younger formed the New Christs with three of the Hitmen: Kingsmill, Masuak and Robertson, as well as Kent Stedman on guitar (also in the Celibate Rifles). Kannis formed a soul music band, Johnny Kannis and the Night Train, during this hiatus. The line-up alongside Kannis was Harris and Phillips from an early version of the Hitmen, together with Michael Buckley on drums (ex-the Radiators), Rohan Cannon on guitar (ex-Rupert B, Earthlings), Don Raffael on saxophone (ex-Rupert B, the Party Boys), Paul Reed on bass guitar and Mick Thornton on trumpet (both ex-Rupert B). In July 1983 Harris, Kannis and Phillips were all injured in a car accident while on tour; Kannis was hospitalised for months and that group broke up.

=== 1984–1989: first reformation and Tora Tora DTK ===
By June 1984 Kannis had recovered sufficiently for the Hitmen to reform with Kingsmill, Masuak and Robertson joined by a new member, Richard Jakimyszyn, on guitar (ex-Lime Spiders, New Christs). While on tour they recorded a live album, Tora Tora DTK (November 1984), at the St George-Budapest Soccer Club and Family Inn by ABC Mobile with Ian Davies and Masuak producing. Soon after the tour Kingsmill, Masuak and Robertson all joined the Screaming Tribesmen and the Hitmen disbanded.

=== 1989–1991: second reformation and Moronic Inferno ===
Kannis and Masuak re-formed the group as the Hitmen DTK in April 1989 with a new line-up: Gye Bennetts on drums (ex-Terminal Twist, Johnny Kannis Explosion), Brad Ferguson on bass guitar (ex-Voodoo Lust) and Matt Le Noury (a.k.a. Matt Nasty) on guitar (ex-Vampire Lovers, Flying Tigers). They issued a four-track extended play, U.E.L.A (initialism for Utopian Emotional Love Aura) via Survival Records in November 1989, which was produced by Masuak. During 1990 they toured Australia co-headlining with Voodoo Lust, and Peter Wells' group, Heart Attack, as support.

The line-up of Hitmen DTK changed with Kannis and Masuak joined by Shane Cooke on bass guitar (ex-Vampire Lovers, Four Horsemen), Gerald Presland on drums and Bob Sattler on guitar (ex-Johnny Kannis Explosion, Roddy Ray'da and the Surfin' Caesars). They recorded a studio album, Moronic Inferno (November 1991), in Austin, Texas, with Andy Bradley and Masuak co-producing. To launch the album, the band performed four Sydney dates in November with guest guitarist Deniz Tek. In 2024, the first of these shows, recorded at Newtown, was released as a live album titled Tonight We Ride! by Vicious Kitten Records. In December of 1991 they toured Australia opening for US rock group, Dark Carnival (see Ron Asheton), but they broke up early in the following year.

=== 2007–present ===
The Hitmen reformed in 2007, with Kannis, Masuak and Robertson joined by Tony "Juke" Jukic on guitar (ex-Johnny Kannis Explosion, Oblivian) and Murray "Muzz" Shepherd (Brad Shepherd's older brother) on drums (ex-Screaming Tribesmen, Lime Spiders); they undertook a set of Australian shows. Re-issues of Hitmen (November 2007), It Is What It Is (2007) and Tora Tora DTK (2009) occurred via Savage Beat/Shock Records: each with detailed liner notes and extra discs of bonus material. A one-off gig on 23 February 2008 with former Dark Carnival and Destroy All Monsters singer-visual artist, Niagara, at The Crest Hotel, Sylvania, was recorded and released as St Valentine's Day Massacre in October 2009 via Savage Beat/Shock Records in Australia and US label, Steel Cage, around the world. The band gigged solidly with a national tour with Niagara undertaken in April 2010.

The Hitmen marked their 30th anniversary with a one-off show at the Sandringham Hotel, Newtown, in Sydney on 21 May 2010. Another retrospective collection, Dancin' Time, of studio and live material was released in November of that year. The band went into hiatus when Masuak moved to Spain in 2015. Kannis finished recording his solo single which was produced by fellow Hitman, Jukic, at the Alchemy Music Group Studios.

In 2017 the Hitmen regrouped for a national tour to promote their compilation album, Solid as a Rock, Kannis, Jukic, Robertson and Murray Shepherd were joined by Vince "the Wiz" Cuscuna on guitar (ex-the Psychotic Turnbuckles). They continued to tour during 2018.

== Members ==
=== Timeline ===
- Peter Banesevic : Guitar
- Gye Bennetts : Drums (1989)
- Clyde Bramley : Bass (1978)
- Alan Brown : Drums (1978)
- Charlie Georges : Guitar (1977–78)
- Warwick Gilbert : Bass, Guitar (1977–78, 1981)
- Steve Harris : Keyboard, Guitar (1978)
- Ivor Hay : Drums (1978–79)
- Richard Jakimyszyn : Guitar, Vocals (1984)
- Tony Jukic : Guitar (2007–present)
- Johnny Kannis : Vocals (1977–present)
- Ron Keeley : Drums (1977)
- Mark Kingsmill: Drums, Vocals (1979–84)
- Chris Masuak : Guitar, Vocals (1976–2015)
- Angie Pepper : Vocals (1977–78)
- Geoff Peterkin : Drums (1979)
- Lynne Phillips : Vocals (1978)
- Tony Robertson : Bass, Vocals (1982–86, 2007– )
- Brad Shepherd : Guitar (1981–82)
- Murray Shepherd : Drums (2007– )
- Phil Somerville : Bass (1978–79)
- Tony Vidale : Guitar (1979–81)
- Robert Sattler : Guitar (1987–91)
- Vince Wiz Cuscuna:Guitar (2016–)
- Gerard (Sundance) Presland
- Drums 1990–1993 (moronic inferno)

== Discography ==
=== Studio albums ===
List of albums, with selected chart positions
Title	Album details	Peak chart positions
Title	Album details	AUS
Hitmen	Released: July 1981; Format: LP; Label: WEA (600097)	67
It Is What it Is	Released: November 1982; Format: LP; Label: RCA (VPL1 0403)	81
Moronic Inferno	Released: November 1991; Format: LP, CD, Cassette; Label: Zeus Records, Shock (Z 58 CHEVY CD)	-

=== Live albums ===
List of albums
Title	Album details
Tora Tora DTK	Released: November 1984; Format: LP, Cassette; Label: ABC Records (L-38240)
St. Valentine's Day Massacre (with Niagara)	Released: 2009; Format: CD, DD; Label: Savage Beat!, Shock (SAVAGE009)
Live Action	Released: November 2015; Format: DD; Label: Laneway

=== Compilation albums ===
List of albums
Title	Album details
78-82	Released: 1988; Format: LP, CD, Cassette; Label: Survival Records (SRCD 04)
Dancing Time '78-'79	Released: November 2010; Format: 2x CD, DD; Label: Savage Beat! (SAVAGE011)
Kicks Right Now: Demos & Out-Takes	Released: November 2015; Format: DD; Label: Laneway
Solid as a Rock: The Best of The Hitmen	Released: March 2017; Format: CD, DD; Label:

=== EPs ===
List of EPs
Title	Album details
U.E.L.A.	Released: 1989; Format: CD, Cassette; Label: Survival (6554166)
Six Pistols	Released: 2018; Format: CD, Vinyl; Label: Alchemy (AMG0181)

=== Singles ===
Year	Title	Peak chart positions	Album
Year	Title	AUS	Album
1979	"Didn't Tell the Man" / "I Am the Man"	75	
1980	"I Want You""	98	Hitmen
1981	"I Don't Mind"/"Rock & Roll Soldier"	—	Hitmen / Tora Tora D.T.K.
1982	"Everybody Knows"/"Dancin' Time"	—	Tora Tora D.T.K.
1982	"Bwana Devil"/"Didn't Wanna Love You"	—	Tora Tora D.T.K.
1991	"Surfing in Another Direction"	—	Moronic Inferno
