= Zeno Beach =

Studio album by Radio Birdman
- Released: June 2006
- Studio: BJB Studios, Surry Hills, Australia
- Genre: Hard rock
- Producer: Deniz Tek; Greg Wales

Radio Birdman chronology
Living Eyes (1981)	Zeno Beach (2006)	Live in Texas (2011)

Zeno Beach is a rock album by Australian band Radio Birdman released in June 2006. It maintains much of the sound the band had in the 1970s while adding a different style with You Am I drummer, Russell Hopkinson.

== Track listing ==
1. "We've Come So Far (To Be Here Today)" (Younger, Tek) – 3:45
2. "You Just Make It Worse" (Younger, Dickson, Tek) – 2:53
3. "Remorseless" (Tek) – 3:41
4. "Found Dead" (Tek) – 3:43
5. "Connected" (Tek) – 3:03
6. "Die Like April" (Tek) – 3:09
7. "Heyday" (Younger, Tek) – 4:20
8. "Subterfuge" (Younger, Tek) – 3:26
9. "If You Say Please" (Younger, Masuak) – 3:04
10. "Hungry Cannibals" (Tek, Masuak, Dickson) – 3:21
11. "Locked Up" (Tek) – 3:48
12. "The Brotherhood of Al Wazah" (Hoyle) – 5:30
13. "Zeno Beach" (Hoyle) – 2:55

== Personnel ==
Radio Birdman

- Chris Masuak – guitar
- Jim Dickson – bass
- Russell Hopkinson – drums
- Pip Hoyle – keyboards
- Deniz Tek – guitar
- Rob Younger – vocals

Production

- Produced by Deniz Tek with Greg Wales
- Recorded by Greg Wales at BJB Studios, Surry Hills
- Mixed by Greg Wales at The Vault, Balmain
- Mastered by Steve Smart at Studios 301
- Management – John Needham
- Cover art painting – Adrian Turner
- Band photography – Tony Mott
- Studio photography – Deniz Tek
- Design – Cameron Moss & Ultra Vivid

== Charts ==
Chart performance for Zeno Beach
Chart (2006)	Peak position
Australian Albums (ARIA)	59
