= Kiss My Poodles Donkey =

1990s Australian rock band

- Origin: Sydney, Australia
- Genre: Rock
- Years active: 1991–1995
- Label: Hot
- Past members: Richard Berckelman; Dave Bullock; Glenda; Doug Ironside; Paul Kidney; Chris Townend; Angela Chenowyth

Kiss My Poodles Donkey were an Australian rock band, which formed in 1991. They issued two albums, Kiss My Poodles Donkey (1991) and New Hope for the Dead (1993), before disbanding in 1995.

== History ==
Kiss My Poodles Donkey were formed in 1991 in Sydney by Richard Berckelman on drums, Dave Bullock on percussion and samples, Glenda on bass guitar, Doug Ironside on guitar, Paul Kidney on vocals and Chris Townend on guitar and vocals. Australian musicologist Ian McFarlane described their sound, "a curious blend of hard rock, mutant funk, swamp-blues and free-form jazz."

The band's self-titled, six-track debut extended play was issued in late 1991 via Hot. All of the tracks were written by Townend. McFarlane felt they "developed an adventurousness in the studio that overcame [live performance] restrictions". In the next year, Glenda was replaced on bass guitar by Angela Chenowyth (ex-Stone Circle).

The group released their full-length studio album, New Hope for the Dead, in October 1993. Besides writing all but one track (Prince's "Gett Off"), Townend produced it at Big Jesus Burger studios, Sydney. According to McFarlane, "[it] was patchy, ranging from noisy hard rock to dreary funk". Dale Harrison of Tharunka caught their performance supporting Kim Salmon and the Surrealists at the Phoenician Club in February 1995. He observed, "their sound is such that it is a wholly visceral... Trance like, one has a sense of having travelled unconsciously while listening but no recollection of what has happened".

== Side-projects and later work ==
Townend had formed a rock duo, Crent, as a side-project with guitarist Kent Steedman of the Celibate Rifles, in 1989. The duo released an EP, Crent (1990), and an album, Pink Album (1993), before Steedman return to his main band the Celibate Rifles. In 1994 Townend, on bass guitar, clarinet, percussion and vocals, formed an improvised noise, free-form jazz, ambient band, Whore with Peter Jones on guitar and vocals and Paul Larson on drums. That group issued a self-titled album in April 1996. Townend also provided screen music composition for TV and film.

Bullock on drums worked for Steedman (guitar, vocals) and Alan Dargin (yiḏaki) in the 1990s, together with Simon Cox on drums (of Died Pretty), Nik Rieth on drums (of the Celibate Rifles), to record "Feet Up" for an EP, Fine Fellows (2019). In 2009 Kidney formed a progressive rock band, Paul Kidney Experience.

== Members ==
- Richard Berckelman – drums
- Dave Bullock – percussion, samples
- Glenda – bass guitar
- Doug Ironside – guitar
- Paul Kidney – vocals
- Chris Townend – guitar, vocals, bass guitar
- Angela Chenowyth – bass guitar

== Discography ==
=== Studio albums ===
- New Hope for the Dead (October 1993) – Hot (HOT1048)

=== Extended plays ===
- Kiss My Poodles Donkey (late 1991) – Hot (KMPD001)
