= Ian McFarlane =

Australian music journalist, historian and author (born 1959)

- Born: 1959 (age 66–67); Australia
- Occupations: Music journalist, music historian, author
- Writing career
- Subjects: Rock, pop
- Notable work: The Encyclopedia of Australian Rock and Pop

Ian McFarlane (born 1959) is an Australian music journalist, music historian and author, whose best known publication is the Encyclopedia of Australian Rock and Pop (1999), which was updated for a second edition in 2017.

As a journalist he started in 1984 with Juke, a rock music newspaper. During the early 1990s he worked for Roadrunner Records while he published a music guide, The Australian New Music Record Guide Volume 1: 1976–1980 (1992). He followed with two fanzines, Freedom Train and Prehistoric Sounds, both issued during 1994 to 1996. McFarlane's The Encyclopedia of Australian Rock and Pop is described by the Australian Music Guide as "the most exhaustive and wide-ranging encyclopedia of Australian music from the 1950s onwards". Subsequently, he was a writer for The Australian and worked for Raven Records, a reissue specialist label, preparing compilations, writing liner notes and providing research. He fulfilled a similar role at Aztec Music from 2004 to March 2012. From July 2013 he has been a contributor to Addicted to Noise, writing a column.

== Biography ==
Ian McFarlane was born in 1959, and started as a freelance music journalist in 1984 writing for Melbourne-based newspaper, Juke, The Edge and From the Vault. During the late 1980s to early 1990s he was a writer with Sydney music magazine Hot Metal and during 1992 to 1994 worked for Roadrunner Records (Australia). In 1992 McFarlane published his first music guide, The Australian New Music Record Guide Volume 1: 1976–1980, which provided a chronological list and brief description of all independent records released by Australian bands in Australia, together with a year-by-year summary of how local independent music developed during that time. This series however did not progress beyond Volume 1, although he did commence Volume 2 – 1981–1983, which was intended to be published at the end of 1994.

In 1994 he wrote and edited the fanzine, Freedom Train, published by Third Stone Press, which covered Australian progressive rock between the 1970s and the 1990s. Issue 1 of Freedom Train comprised a series of articles, interviews and discographies of bands, including Spectrum, Ariel, Madder Lake, The Masters Apprentices and Kahvas Jute. Issue 2 covered bands and musicians including Chain, Phil Manning, Taman Shud, Sebastian Hardie, Healing Force and Galadriel. At the same time he also wrote and edited Prehistoric Sounds, published by Dark City Press, which dealt with Australian indie rock from the 1970s and 1980s. Issue 1 contained articles on The Saints, Models, The Psycho-Surgeons, The Lipstick Killers, The Thought Criminals and Au-Go-Go Records, together with interviews with Ed Kuepper, Sean Kelly and Mark Taylor. Issue 2 included articles on The Scientists, The Birthday Party, Citadel Records and The Laughing Clowns and interviews with Kim Salmon, Rowland S. Howard and Kuepper. Issue 3 had articles on Radio Birdman, The Visitors, New Race, Deniz Tek, New Christs, Fun Things and The Hitmen, as well as interviews with Rob Younger and Brad Shepherd. Issue 4, which was also the final issue, contained articles on Beasts of Bourbon, Died Pretty, The Moodists and Greasy Pop Records, as well as interviews with Tex Perkins, Brett Myers, Ron Peno, Dave Graney and Clare Moore.

McFarlane wrote The Encyclopedia of Australian Rock and Pop in December 1999. His magnum opus is described by the Australian Music Guide as "the most exhaustive and wide-ranging encyclopedia of Australian music from the 1950s onwards". Fellow music journalist, Debbie Kruger, describes it as "brilliantly researched, unfailingly thorough, never boring. Essential".

From the late 1990s he was a writer for The Australian. He worked for Raven Records, a reissue specialist label, preparing compilations, writing liner notes and providing research. He wrote most of the liner notes for Aztec Music releases from its establishment in 2004 to its closure in March 2012. McFarlane detailed the importance of Aztec Music's reissues after decades of recovery from a mid-1970s punk-inspired backlash "those punk bands came in and said 'Anything pre-1976 is crap' ... That carried over well into the '80s and '90s' ... It took a long time for people to get over that post-'76 thing of 'No, we don't care about our heritage'".

In June 2008 The Age newspaper commemorated 50 years of Australian rock 'n' roll (the anniversary of the release of Johnny O'Keefe's "Wild One") by selecting the Top 50 Australian Albums, with McFarlane selected as one of the industry judges. From July 2013 he has been a contributor to Addicted to Noise, writing a column. McFarlane updated his encyclopaedia for a second edition in 2017. 'The Sydney Morning Herald's Steven Carroll observed, "It's so easy to get lost in this revised edition: one band leading to another, and so on, until you're suddenly asking yourself what happened to the last hour."

== Bibliography ==
- McFarlane, Ian (1992). The Australian New Music Record Guide Volume 1: 1976–1980. Golden Square, Vic.: Moonlight Publishing. ISBN 978-0-646-13267-9.
- McFarlane, Ian (1994). "Vol. 1 Issue 1". Freedom Train – Aussie Progressive Rock 1970–1976. Third Stone Press. ISSN 1327-6387.
- McFarlane, Ian (1994). "Vol. 1 Issue 1". Prehistoric Sounds – Aussie Indie Music 1976–1989. Dark City Press.
- McFarlane, Ian (1995). "Vol. 1 Issue 2". Freedom Train – Aussie Progressive Rock 1970–1976. Third Stone Press. ISSN 1327-6387.
- McFarlane, Ian (1995). "Vol. 1 Issue 2". Prehistoric Sounds – Aussie Indie Music 1976–1990. Dark City Press.
- McFarlane, Ian (1996). "Vol. 1 Issue 3: The Australian Progressive, Hard Rock and Blues Record Guide". Freedom Train – Aussie Progressive Rock 1970–1976. Third Stone Press. ISSN 1327-6387.
- McFarlane, Ian (1996). "Vol. 1 Issue 3". Prehistoric Sounds – Aussie Indie Music 1976–1990. Dark City Press.
- McFarlane, Ian (1996). "Vol. 1 Issue 4". Prehistoric Sounds – Aussie Indie Music 1976–1990. Dark City Press.
- McFarlane, Ian (1999). The Encyclopedia of Australian Rock and Pop. St. Leonards, N.S.W.: Allen & Unwin. ISBN 1-86448-768-2.
  - McFarlane, Ian; Jenkins, Jeff (2017). The Encyclopedia of Australian Rock and Pop (2nd ed.). Gisborne, VIC: Third Stone Press. ISBN 978-0-9953856-0-3.
