= The First and the Last (album) =

Live album by New Race
- Released: 1982
- Recorded: April–May 1981
- Venue: Selina's, Sgt. Peppers, Manly Vale Hotel, and Crystal Ballroom
- Genre: Rock and roll Punk rock
- Label: WEA
- Producer: Charles Ficher, Rob Younger and Alan Thorne

Professional ratings
Review scores
Source	Rating
Allmusic	(4/5)

The First and the Last is a live album released by the "once-only" supergroup band New Race. The First and the Last is a collection of recordings from the various shows the band played along the east coast of Australia in 1981. New Race contained members of the band Radio Birdman; Deniz Tek, Rob Younger, and Warwick Gilbert, along with The Stooges guitarist Ron Asheton and MC5 drummer Dennis Thompson. The First and Last is often hailed as one of the greatest live punk rock albums of all time, although there is a dispute as to the true genre of the album. Radio Birdman are often regarded as one of the integral influences of Australian punk rock, but their style and sound is often compared to that of the MC5 Detroit sound, and the broad genre of proto-punk, which includes bands such as The Stooges, The Velvet Underground, and The New York Dolls.

While the band was recorded live, Rob Younger's lead vocal track was re-recorded in the studio before release. Several bootleg recordings of the tour on French record label Revenge show that there were no obvious issues with Younger's voice, however the original recordings with Younger's live vocal from the tour have never been released.

== Track listing ==
1. "Crying Sun"
2. "Haunted Road"
3. "Sad T.V."
4. "Breaks My Heart"
5. "Looking at You"
6. "November 22, 1963"
7. "Alone in the Endzone"
8. "Love Kills"
9. "Gotta Keep Movin'"
10. "Columbia"

== Personnel ==
New Race

- Ron Asheton - Guitar
- Warwick Gilbert - Bass
- Deniz Tek - Guitar, backing vocals
- Dennis Thompson - Drums, backing vocals
- Rob Younger - Lead vocals

with:

- Chris Masuak - Third guitar on "Columbia" and "Looking at You"
- Clyde Bramley - Studio-dubbed backing vocals on "Crying Sun", "Haunted Road" and "Columbia"
