= Radio Birdman =

Australian punk rock band

- Radio Birdman logo

Background information
- Origin: Sydney, New South Wales, Australia
- Genres: Punk rock; garage rock; proto-punk; surf rock
- Years active: 1974–1978, 1996–2008, 2014–present
- Labels: Sire; Crying Sun
- Members: Phillip "Pip" Hoyle; Deniz Tek; Rob Younger; Jim Dickson; Nik Rieth; Dave Kettley
- Past members: Ron Keeley; Carl Rourke; Warwick Gilbert; Chris Masuak; Russell Hopkinson
- Website: radiobirdman.com

Radio Birdman are an Australian punk rock band formed by Deniz Tek and Rob Younger in Sydney in 1974. Classic Rock magazine describes them as "Australia's first influential punk band".

== History ==
=== Origins ===
Radio Birdman were formed as a rock group in November 1974 in Sydney by American-born Deniz Tek on guitar and backing vocals (ex-TV Jones) with former members of the Rats, Phillip "Pip" Hoyle on keyboards, Ron Keeley on drums, Carl Rourke on bass guitar and Rob Younger on lead vocals. The band's name is from a mondegreen of the lyric phrase "Radio 'burning'" in the Stooges' song "1970". Within a month they were performing some original material alongside cover versions of the Dictators, Blue Öyster Cult, the Ventures, the Doors, Alice Cooper and John Lennon's "Cold Turkey". Rourke was soon replaced by former Rats member Warwick Gilbert on bass guitar.

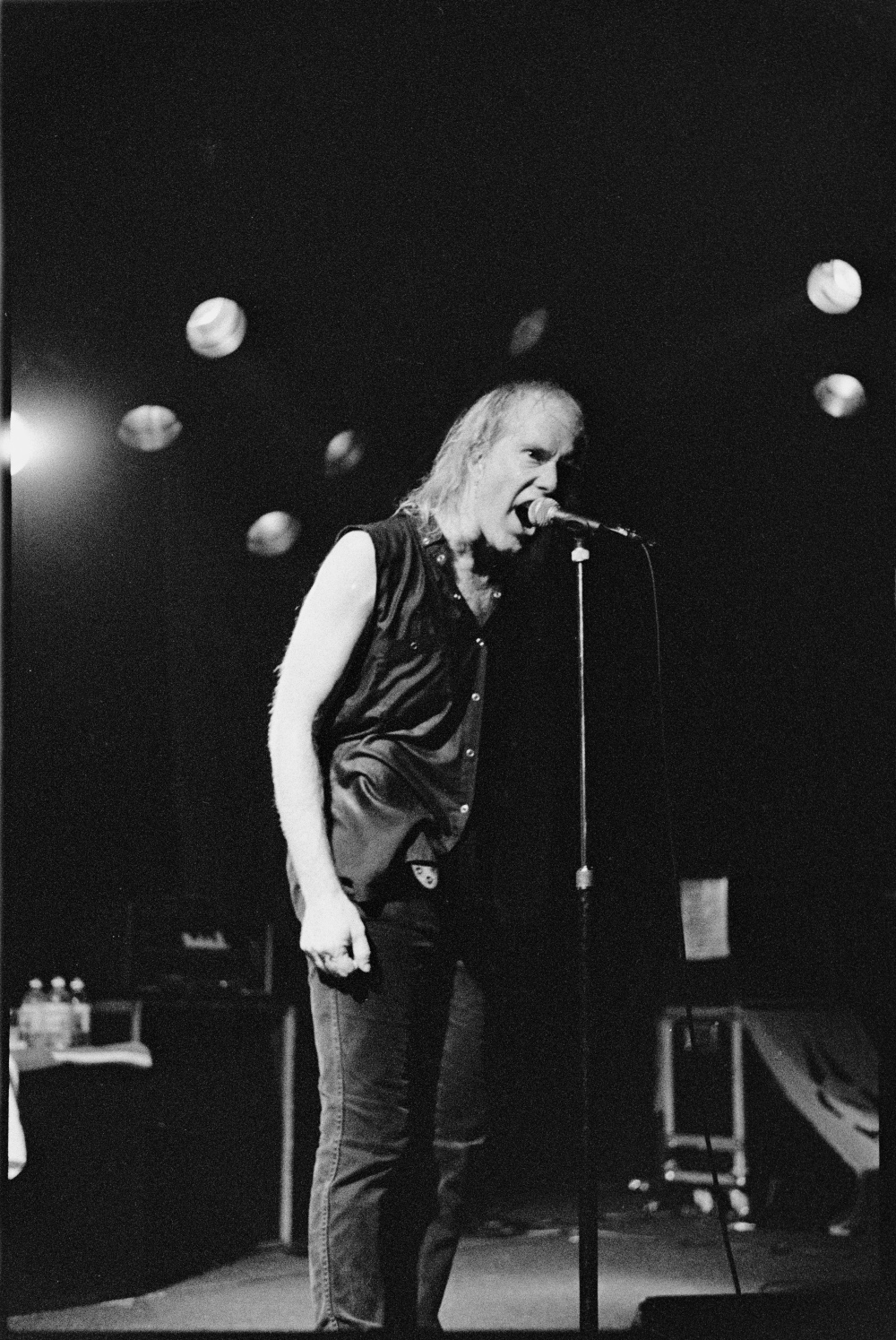
Rob Younger, during a performance by Radio Birdman in Melbourne in 1996.

In 1975, after facing rejection from promoters and performing in various inferior venues they began organising their own gigs. According to Australian musicologist, Ian McFarlane they were "loathed and shunned by the mainstream music industry". Australian music journalist, Ed Nimmervoll observed that besides being louder than contemporary groups, they "added to their menacing image with paramilitary stage clothes, and the parading of the band's mystical-looking eagles wings-flying saucer symbol" (see infobox above). However they won Rock Australia Magazine (RAM) and Levi's Punk Band Thriller contest in December 1975, whereby the group secured a residency at the Oxford Tavern, Taylor Square, Sydney. Hoyle left to be replaced by Canadian-born Chris "Klondike" Masuak on guitar, piano and backing vocals. They eventually took over the tavern's management, renaming it The Oxford Funhouse.

Radio Birdman developed a following within the emerging Sydney punk scene. With the encouragement of RAM's editor, Anthony O'Grady, the band recorded their debut four-track extended play (EP), Burn My Eye (October 1976), with John Sayers and Charles Fisher producing at Trafalgar Studios, Annandale. It was followed by their first album, Radios Appear, which was also produced by Sayers and Fisher.

Under Michael McMartin's management, Trafalgar Studios signed the band and financed the recordings. Radios Appear was critically acclaimed, earning 5 stars in the Australian edition of Rolling Stone. The album was influenced by Detroit bands of the late 1960s, such as MC5 and the Stooges. The album's title comes from the Blue Öyster Cult song, "Dominance and Submission", from their 1974 Secret Treaties album, which influenced Radio Birdman's sound. Radios Appear was played on Sydney station 2JJ (Double Jay). Released on the newly created independent label Trafalgar Records, the album was sold by mail order and distributed by band members and friends to a few record stores, never achieving widespread sales or commercial success.

Several years after the initial release and following the band's breakup, Trafalgar Records licensed the recordings to WEA, who took on the album and gave it a wider release. However, sales remained limited.

When Sire Records president Seymour Stein came to Australia to sign Brisbane punk band the Saints, he saw Radio Birdman and invited them to join his label. Under Sire, licensed by Trafalgar, Radio Birdman released a new version of Radios Appear featuring a mixture of re-mixed, re-recorded, and some new material.

As the punk movement in Australia continued to grow, the underground scene at the Funhouse began to attract some outsider groups, including the Sydney chapter of the Hells Angels. Following a concert at Paddington Town Hall with the Saints and the Hot Spurs in April 1977, Radio Birdman left the Sydney scene, playing sporadically in other cities and working on new material.

The band returned six months later and performed their most well-attended show at Paddington Town Hall on 12 December 1977, with approximately 2,000 attendees. After this show, the band moved their base of operations to London and toured in the UK and Europe, headlining and as support for Sire label-mates the Flamin' Groovies.

Their overseas operations were short-lived, as Sire Records began having financial difficulties and dropped Radio Birdman and many other bands from the label. A planned American tour with the Ramones, scheduled for the second half of 1978, was cancelled. In May 1978, they recorded their second album, Living Eyes at Rockfield Studios in Wales. Unreleased by Sire, the tapes were released in 1981, long after the band's 1978 breakup.

=== Breakup ===
Without a label, with no tour support or distribution for Radios Appear, the relationships between the band's members grew strained. They split up after playing one last show at Oxford University in June 1978.

=== 1978–1996 ===
All six members went on to other bands. Younger joined the Other Side, and later New Christs, bands more oriented towards hard rock. Tek, Keeley, and keyboardist Pip Hoyle formed the Doors-influenced inner-city band the Visitors. Guitarist Chris Masuak and bass guitarist Warwick Gilbert's the Hitmen went on to participate in the Australian pub rock scene. Tek, Younger, and Gilbert played in a one-shot touring band called New Race, with Dennis Thompson of the MC5 and Ron Asheton of the Stooges. They made no studio recordings but released one official "live" album, The First and Last, and there are two more "bootleg" live albums, The First to Pay and The Second Wave, on the French label Revenge.

A non-musical LP, Soldiers of Rock 'n' Roll, was released in 1982. This album, described by the record company as "an audio documentary of Radio Birdman," was released after Deniz Tek had left music to pursue a career as a jet pilot and was assembled by the people at Trafalgar Records, akin to a soundtrack for a documentary that was never produced.

=== Reunion ===
Radio Birdman reunited for the Big Day Out tour in 1996 and again in 1997. Since then, Radio Birdman has toured sporadically. In 2002, Warwick Gilbert was replaced by Jim Dickson, who had previously played with the New Christs, Louis Tillett, the Passengers, the Barracudas and Deniz Tek. Drummer Ron Keeley left the band in 2004 after the band's performance at the Azkena Festival in Spain. He was temporarily replaced by Nik Reith, formerly of the Celibate Rifles, Tumbleweed, the New Christs and the Deniz Tek Group. He was replaced after six shows by You Am I drummer Rusty Hopkinson.

The band's next album, Zeno Beach, was released in Australia on 24 June 2006 via the band's own Crying Sun Records, and in the US via Yep Roc Records on 22 August. Zeno Beach was recorded in Sydney in December 2005, produced by guitarist Deniz Tek and engineer Greg Wales. Carl Roke, the original Radio Birdman bassist, died the year of the new album's scheduled release, which was dedicated to his memory.

Following a February tour of Australian capital cities, the band toured internationally in support of Zeno Beach in Australia, New Zealand, Europe, and the US, from 27 July 2006 in Sydney to 7 October. This was the first time Radio Birdman played in America. Many Australian dates featured the LA soul/punk band The Bellrays.

In July 2007, the band was inducted into the Australian Recording Industry Association (ARIA) Hall of Fame (in an interview, vocalist Rob Younger indicated the band had previously declined an invitation to join the Hall of Fame years before). The induction saw all living original members plus current members attend the ceremony, except for Pip Hoyle.

Daniel Johns of Silverchair gave the induction speech, followed by the band playing a two-song set. The three guitarists (Tek, Masuak, and Dickson) also participated in a rehearsed stage move, each holding up their guitars and saluting the drums during the song New Race. Murray Shepherd (ex-The Screaming Tribesmen and current The Hitmen drummer) sat in on drums for this occasion, as then-drummer Russell Hopkinson was touring with You Am I.

The band toured Australia, the US, Canada, and Europe, with approximately 80 concerts in 2007. In September 2007, the band featured in the Clash of the Titans tour alongside the Stems and Hoodoo Gurus which launched in Sydney at the Enmore Theatre and included dates across Australia. In October 2007, Radio Birdman ceased touring after a long run of dates in Europe, ending in Athens, Greece.

In 2014, the band released a box set on the Citadel label. The box set included 7 CDs and 1 DVD, featuring remasters of the band's official releases plus archived and previously unheard studio material. The box also contains a professional recording of the 12 December 1977 Paddington Town Hall concert. In November 2014, the band was reassembled to promote the release of the Box Set and played shows across Australia. The 2014 lineup featured Nik Rieth on drums and Dave Kettley on guitar (replacing longtime member Chris Masuak), along with Jim Dickson (bass) and original founding members Rob Younger, Pip Hoyle, and Deniz Tek. Radio Birdman completed European and Australian tours in 2015 and 2016.

In June and July 2017, the band undertook a joint national tour with Died Pretty. They last performed live in 2019.

In 2017, Radio Birdman was the subject of a feature-length documentary, Descent into the Maelstrom – The Radio Birdman Story. The film covered the band's history, from precursor bands the Rats and TV Jones to their European tour in 2015. In December 2020, Radio Birdman were listed at number 44 in Rolling Stone Australia's "50 Greatest Australian Artists of All Time" issue.

In 2024, Radio Birdman toured Australia to celebrate their 50th anniversary. The tour culminated with a Sydney concert. A biography "Retaliate First: How one band smashed the rules of Australian rock and roll" was released in July 2024 coinciding with this final tour.

== Members ==
=== Current ===
- Philip "Pip" Hoyle – keyboards (1974–1975, 1976–1978, 1996–2008, 2014–present)
- Deniz Tek – guitar (1974–1978, 1996–2008, 2014–present)
- Rob Younger – vocals (1974–1978, 1996–2008, 2014–present)
- Jim Dickson – bass guitar (2002–2008, 2014–present)
- Nik Rieth – drums (2005, 2014–present)
- Dave Kettley – guitar (2014–present)

=== Former ===
- Carl Rourke – bass guitar (1974–1975; died 2005)
- Ron Keeley – drums (1974–1978, 1996–2004)
- Warwick Gilbert – bass guitar (1975–1978, 1996–2002)
- Chris "Klondike" Masuak – guitar (1976–1978, 1996–2008)
- Russell "Rusty" Hopkinson – drums (2005–2008)

== Crying Sun records ==
Crying Sun Records
- Founded: 1996
- Founder: Radio Birdman
- Genre: Indie rock/Garage rock
- Country of origin: Australia
- Location: Sydney

Crying Sun Records is a record company privately owned by Radio Birdman. Only a few albums have been released by this label including Radio Birdman's 1996 live album, Ritualism and their 2006 reunion album, Zeno Beach.

The label is named after the song "Crying Sun" by Radio Birdman on their 1981 studio album, Living Eyes. Crying Sun Records was originally based around band-owned music venue turned bar, The Oxford Funhouse. Crying Sun Records was created by the band in association with Citadel Records to handle all the band's current and future recorded work. It was created to ensure that the band would be completely independent of record industry support or influence.

The Crying Sun Records logo was designed by Radio Birdman bass player, Warwick Gilbert.

== Discography ==
=== Studio albums ===
List of albums, with selected details and chart positions
Title	Album details	Peak chart positions
Title	Album details	AUS
Radios Appear	Released: 1977; Format: LP; Label: Trafalgar (TRL 1001)	51
Radios Appear (Overseas Version)	Released: 1978; Format: LP; Label: Trafalgar (TRL 102)	89
Living Eyes	Released: 1981; Format: LP; Label: WEA (6000085)	55
Zeno Beach	Released: 2006; Format: CD; Label:	59

=== Live albums ===
Title	Release
More Fun! (ep)	1988
Ritualism	1996
Live in Texas	2011
Live at Paddington Town Hall	2015

=== Compilations ===
Title	Release	Notes
Soldiers of Rock'n'Roll: An Audio Documentary of Radio Birdman CD	1982	
Under the Ashes CD/LP	1988	
The EPs (CD)	1992	
The Essential Radio Birdman CD (SubPop)	2001	US CMJ Top 200 Albums #9
Living Eyes/More Fun CD	2005	
Radio Birdman Box Set	2014	

=== Singles ===
Title	Release
"New Race/TV Eye"	1977
"Aloha Steve and Danno/Anglo Girl Desire"	1978
"What Gives?/Anglo Girl Desire"	1978
"Alone in the Endzone/Breaks My Heart"	1981
"Hungry Cannibals/Rock Bottom"	2006
"Zeno Beach/Subterfuge"	2007
"Buried and Dead/Ballad of Dwight Fry"	2016

== Documentary ==
In 2018, the DVD documentary Descent into the Maelstrom: The Radio Birdman Story was released internationally; it also received an HD release on Vimeo and iTunes. It was written, directed and edited in Australia by Jonathan Sequeira, and produced by Mark Sequeira and Jonathan Sequeira. The documentary features live footage of the band and interviews with its members and fans. The DVD was an official selection of the Detroit Freep Film Festival 2018, the Glasgow Film Festival 2018, the London Screensound Festival 2018, and the Manifesto Festival Amsterdam 2018. The Guardian called it "brutally honest', and I-94 Bar called it "the best rock documentary ever made".
