= Mosquito (film) =

- Theatrical release poster
- Directed by: Gary Jones
- Written by: Tom Chaney; Steve Hodge; Gary Jones
- Starring: Gunnar Hansen; Ron Asheton; Steve Dixon; Josh Becker
- Cinematography: Tom Chaney
- Distributed by: Hemdale Communications, Inc.
- Release dates: November 21, 1994 (Japan); May 20, 1995 (United States)
- Running time: 92 minutes
- Country: United States
- Language: English
- Budget: $200,000 (estimated)
- Box office: $986,314

Mosquito (also known as Blood Fever) is a 1994 American science fiction horror film directed by Gary Jones. The film features actor Gunnar Hansen, who portrayed the character Leatherface in the 1974 horror film The Texas Chain Saw Massacre, along with Ron Asheton, lead guitarist for the band the Stooges. The film has earned a cult following since its release.

== Plot ==
An alien spacecraft crashes down in a U.S. national park. A mosquito sucks the blood of the craft's deceased extraterrestrial pilot, causing the insect to mutate to an abnormally large size. While driving to a summer camp in the park, lovers Megan and Ray accidentally hit the mosquito. They get out of the vehicle, and Ray finds its severed proboscis in his car's radiator. Meanwhile, a park ranger named Hendricks is ordered by the park chief to spray gaseous mosquito repellent.

Afterwards, three bank robbers, Earl, Junior, and Rex, stop in the park. Rex walks to an outhouse, where he encounters a giant mosquito. He runs from it, calling for help, and is accidentally shot by Junior. Earl kills the mosquito with a Franchi SPAS-12 shotgun. Later, two park rangers are fishing when they are attacked by mosquitoes. One of the rangers has his eye gouged out by a mosquito; the other ranger falls off the boat into the water, and after swimming back to land, is killed when a mosquito stabs him with its proboscis.

That night, a couple is having sex in a tent. When the man leaves the tent to urinate, one of the mosquitoes enters the tent and impales the woman through one of her buttocks; her lover is then attacked. The next morning, Ray meets a meteorologist named Parks, who drives Ray and Megan to the park. Parks is searching for a meteorite that reportedly landed in the park. Parks' radiation monitor begins detecting radioactivity, and they track the source to the boat containing the dead fishing ranger. They drive to the park to notify the police, where they find the park's rangers and visitors to have all been killed.

They find the carcass of a mosquito, and Megan determines it to be of the species Aedes aegypti. A survivor named Hendricks informs the others that the park's electrical and communication systems were destroyed in the attack. The group plan to drive to a city for help, and they take a nearby RV, escaping a swarm of approaching mosquitoes. After night falls, they stumble across Earl and Junior. The criminals unsuccessfully attempt to hijack the RV, and they are tied up and brought along.

A swarm of mosquitoes proceed to chase the RV. As the mosquitoes attack through the windows, Megan accidentally opens a side door and hangs precariously from it, before being saved by Hendricks. Earl breaks free from his restraints, uses a hatchet to save Junior from a mosquito, and threatens to kill Megan. She stabs Earl with a severed proboscis as another wave of mosquitoes assault the RV, causing it to crash. As the group crawls through a pipe to evade the swarm, Junior is impaled by a mosquito, causing his eyes to bulge and explode.

The mosquitoes follow them into the pipe, and the group sets some of their clothes on fire to deter the insects. While hiding safely in the pipe system, they conclude that the "meteorite" and the mosquitoes are connected. They return outside the next morning and split up; Ray, Earl, and Hendricks investigate a nearby farmhouse while Megan and Parks search for the "meteorite". After regrouping, they board up the farmhouse. After sunset, Parks reveals that he fought in the Vietnam War, and Hendricks reveals that he did as well. The mosquitoes begin to infiltrate the farmhouse, and Earl defends himself with a chainsaw.

Ray tears off a mosquito's wings to save Hendricks, and Megan sets one of the mosquitoes on fire using a stove. In the house's basement, Parks and Hendricks discover a colossal nest of mosquito eggs. The group rigs the house to explode by breaking its gas line and opening up the windows, and Ray and Megan escape to the roof by taking turns in a dumbwaiter. Upon Hendricks' turn, the dumbwaiter breaks, and Hendricks falls to his death. Ray and Megan jump from the roof, and the house explodes with Earl, Parks, Hendricks' dead body and the mosquitoes inside. After sunrise, Ray and Megan find Parks alive, having protected himself from the explosion by hiding in a refrigerator.

== Cast ==
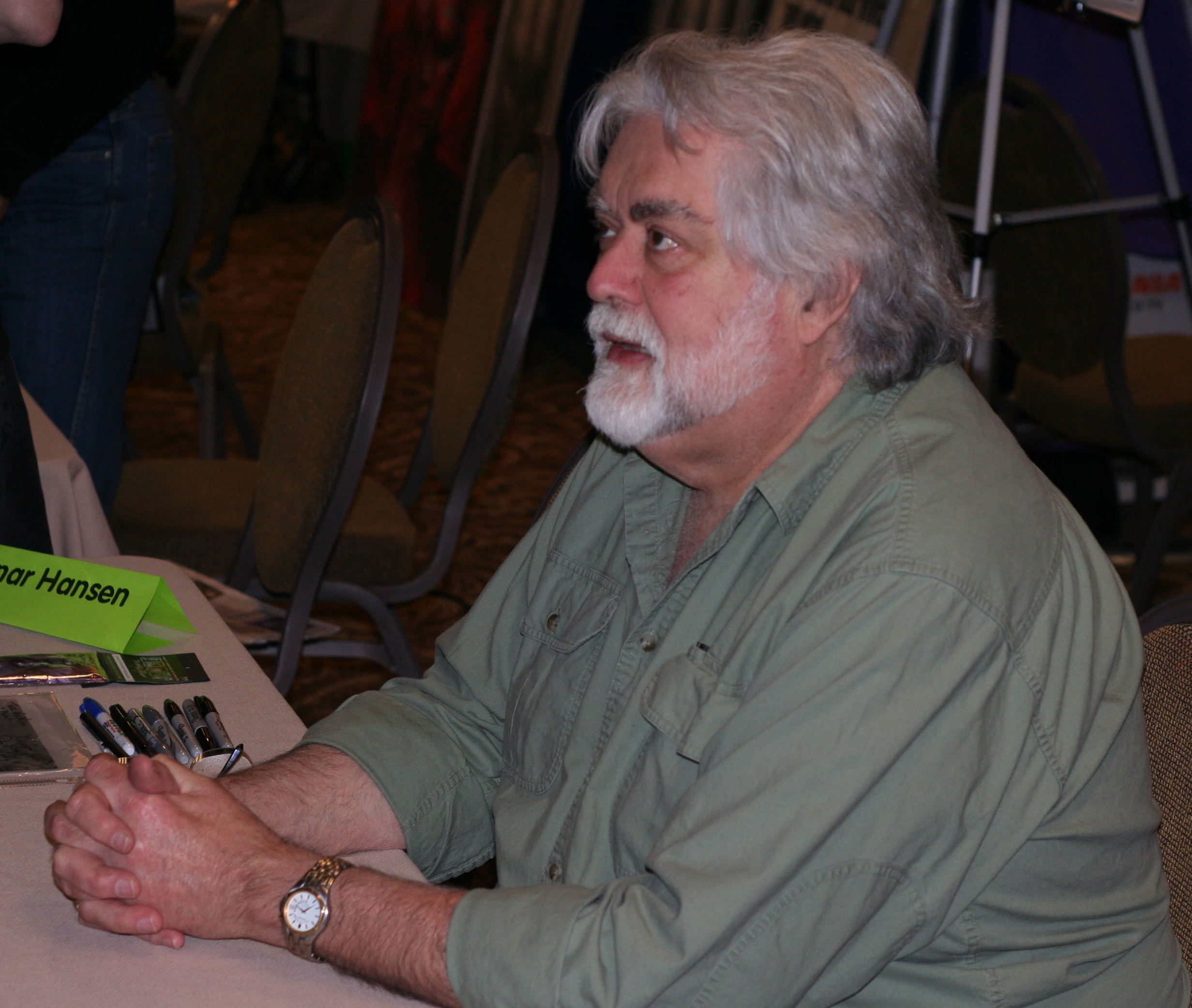
Gunnar Hansen is featured as the character Earl.

- Tim Lovelace as Ray, Megan's Boyfriend
- Rachel Loiselle as Park Ranger Megan
- Steve Dixon as Parks, USAF Meteor Chaser
- Ron Asheton as Park Ranger Hendricks
- Gunnar Hansen as Earl, The Bank Robber
- Mike Hard as Junior, Earl's Brother
- Kenny Mugwump as Rex, Earl's Cousin
- John Reneaud as Park Ranger Tony
- Josh Becker as Steve, The Camper
- Margaret Gomoll as Mary, The Camper
- Guy Sanville as Chief F.B. Morrow
- Joel Hale as Jack, The Fisherman
- Howard Brusseau Jr. as Pa Jones
- Patricia Kay Jones as Ma Jones
- Ken Laplace as Police Investigator
- Steve Hodge as Alan Smithee, Channel 3 News Reporter
- Patrick Butler as Willis Cabins Motel Proprietor
- Suzanne Bussard as Volleyball Girl
- Rebecca Jones as Girl In Sandbox
- Victoria Swanwick as Little Girl On Beach

== Production ==
Director Gary Jones originally planned for the film to revolve around group of criminals, beginning with a large bank heist and ending with a violent shootout, but this was deemed too expensive. The script was subsequently rewritten by Tom Chaney, and the film's original title was Skeeters. Upon learning that a film named Skeeter, which had a similar concept about killer mosquitoes, was already recently produced, the title was changed to Blood Fever. During post-production, the film was renamed Nightswarm—appearing as such in the April 1994 issue of Fangoria—before its title was later finally changed to Mosquito. The film was shot entirely in Michigan, near the city of Detroit.

The effects for the film's mosquitoes were created through a mix of stop-motion animation and puppetry, and some shots, such as when the swarm of mosquitoes is shown to be converging on the farmhouse, were generated using traditional cel animation. The mosquito that explodes when shot by Earl was a rubber puppet that contained the film crew's leftovers from their lunch break, in order to simulate the insect's internal organs and fluids. The film's original special effects artist supposedly left the set during production to smoke cigarettes and never returned.

The scene in which the RV crashes onto its side was created using a scale model of the vehicle; the spacecraft in the film's opening scene was also a model, and was filmed using a forced perspective technique. The most expensive shot in the film was stock footage of a mosquito being born, shown in the opening scene. The footage was purchased for $1,500.

== Release ==
Mosquito was intended to have a wide theatrical release in November 1994 but their distributors, Hemdale Communications, were forced to file for bankruptcy before the release date. It was released on home video on May 20, 1995. The film was released in the VHS and LaserDisc formats, and in 1999 was released on DVD. This film was released on the DVD by 20th Century Fox Home Entertainment in 2004. Copies of the DVD were at one time considered rare, and reached asking prices of $400 on websites like eBay and Amazon.com. After its release, the film was often shown on the USA Network and on the Sci-Fi Channel. Synapse Films reissued the film on DVD and released a Blu-ray edition on October 13, 2015 for the film's 20th anniversary.

== Reception ==
Mosquito received generally negative reviews at the time of its release, but has since grown a cult following. The film holds a rating of 60% on review aggregator website Rotten Tomatoes, with an average rating of 5.2/10 based on 5 reviews. Brett Gallmann of the website Oh, The Horror! praised the film's special effects and called it "what the platonic ideal for what cable-TV monster movies should be".

Felix Vasquez Jr. of Cinema Crazed gave the film a mostly positive review, writing that "Mosquito is a classically bad monster movie with a low budget, and a neat idea. It delivers giant mosquitoes sucking on humans regardless of its limitations, and amounts to a very memorable guilty pleasure." TV Guide awarded the film 2 out of 4 stars, calling it "a simplistic but energetic B-movie." Entertainment Weekly gave the film a positive B+ rating and called it "the best of the recent spate of mutant insect movies" and "a giant-creature film made by giant-creature fanatics".
