= The Celibate Rifles =

Australian punk rock band

- Origin: Sydney, New South Wales, Australia
- Genres: Punk rock, indie rock, garage rock
- Years active: 1979–2019
- Labels: Hot, True Tone, Festival, Shock, Laneway Music
- Past members: Damien Lovelock; Dave Morris; Kent Steedman; Jim Leone; Paul Larsen; Michael Couvret; Phil Jacquet; Ian Martin; James Darroch; Rudy Morabito; Nik Rieth
- Website: facebook.com/TheCelibateRifles

The Celibate Rifles were an Australian punk rock band who formed in 1979 with a line-up that included mainstays Dave Morris on rhythm guitar and Kent Steedman on lead guitar; within a year they were joined by Damien Lovelock on lead vocals. They released their first album, Sideroxylon, in April 1983 on the Hot Records label. The band has toured both America and Europe extensively, and released their ninth studio album, Beyond Respect on 19 July 2004. In 1985 the group's style was described as post-Radio Birdman sound which is "a combination of fast, guitar-driven, hard rock and power pop". In November 1987 Sounds magazine's Roger Holland described their album, Roman Beach Party as showing the group's "sawn off rock potential all the way down to the bleached white of the bone, the lyrics reveal all the anger, insight and humour that makes [them] one of the most powerful rock bands in the world today". In April 1994 The Celibate Rifles issued Spaceman in a Satin Suit which according to Australian rock music historian, Ian McFarlane "was [their] best studio album since Blind Ear". Lovelock undertook a solo career and issued two albums as well as becoming a TV sports presenter prior to his death in 2019.

== History ==
The Celibate Rifles were formed in 1979 in Sydney as a punk rock group with a line-up of Michael Couvret on bass guitar, Phillip Jacquet on drums, Dave Morris on guitar and Kent Steedman on guitar. The four band members were still at high school when the group started performing. Their original vocalist, Ian Martin, soon joined. Their name is a response to the Sex Pistols – as an antonym or inspiration. In 1980 Damien Lovelock (ex-Street Noise) replaced Martin on lead vocals – he was ten years older than the others and provided a "lyrical focus for the band's unremitting energy". In 1985 the group's style was described as post-Radio Birdman sound which is "a combination of fast, guitar-driven, hard rock and power pop".

In March 1982 the group independently recorded a four-track extended play, But Jacques, the Fish?, at Honey Farms Studio, Duffys Forest. It was produced by Colin J Ford and engineered by Dave Connor with additional backing vocals by Martin, James Darroch, Tom Couvret and Steve Vineburg. The band was signed by Hot Records, which reissued their EP in March 1983. Darroch (ex-Trans Love Energy, Fifth Estate, Slaughterhouse 5) replaced Michael Couvret on bass guitar, who went on to join the Mushroom Planet. In April the same year, the group released their debut album, Sideroxylon. Eucalyptus sideroxylon is the scientific name of the red or mugga ironbark. The album was produced by Connor and Ford with additional musicians including Simon Knuckey (Wet Taxis) on guitar, Tracey Pearson on saxophone, Sandie Rose on trumpet, Scott Spillane on backing vocals, Duncan Sproul on trombone, and Bruce Tatham on piano and organ. RAM's Frank Brunetti found the band's "white trash thrash is one of the best manifestations of their style of music by the judicious use of other instruments – sax, trombone, trumpet, keyboards, extra guitars and vocals – the strength, humour, style and intelligence of their sonic attack comes through with undiminished force".

Upon Sideroxylon's release both Lovelock and Steedman focused on separate side-projects. Lovelock formed an acoustic studio band, No Dance, with Bruce Calloway (New Christs) on guitar; Brett Myers (Died Pretty) on guitar and backing vocals; and Louis Tillett (Wet Taxis) on vocals, keyboards and harmonica. In March 1984 No Dance issued a three-track EP, Carnival of Souls, on Hot Records, which was produced by Connor and Steedman. Meanwhile Steedman had joined New Christs which supported Iggy Pop on his June 1983 Australian tour. Steedman appeared on New Christs' single, "Born Out of Time", and stayed with them until October, when The Celibate Rifles resumed.

Michael Mackie, writing in The Australian Almanac (1985), found two distinguishing qualities in The Celibate Rifles: they are "based in the upper middle-class area of Sydney ... [and are] prepared to comment on a variety of social issues ranging from the destruction of rainforests to the problems created by an ever-increasing suburbia".

The Celibate Rifles' next singles, "Pretty Pictures" (October 1983) and "Merry Xmas Blues" (December) included acoustic guitars instead of the usual all-electric front. Rolling Stone's Clinton Walker described "Pretty Pictures", as "a delicate acoustic ballad that surprised more than a few people". In January 1984 Darroch left to form The Eastern Dark – he died in a van accident in March 1986 which also injured his band mates. Couvret returned for the second album, The Celibate Rifles (May 1984), which is also called 5 Languages for its cover depicting the band's name in French, Arabic, English, Chinese and Spanish. The album was produced by Connor and Steedman and provided the singles "Wild Desire" (April 1984) and "Sometimes" (November). Australian rock historian, Ian McFarlane, described it as "still rough-hewn but with more variation, style and power than the debut". David Fricke of Rolling Stone felt it displayed "urban teen frenzy with lyricist Lovelock's adult fears erupting in a glowing atomic fireball of bazooka guitars and terminal volume".

The band's only release for 1985 was the single, "6 Days on the Road", in July. Their third album, The Turgid Miasma of Existence, appeared in June 1986. It was produced by Steedman. Helen Fitzgerald of Melody Maker saw the group "evolve into a bucking, rearing creature that hijacks your turntable and confounds your friends ... [by a] series of evolutionary stages to reach peak form with this album that sees them oscillate wildly from loud and thrashy to subdued and glowering". The first 500 copies of the album included a limited edition EP of three tracks: "Eddie", "Ice Blue" and "Thank You America". The Celibate Rifles toured the United States, where their records were praised by the underground press. The tour was arranged and financed independently by the band. In July that year they recorded a live performance at New York's CBGB music club, which was issued in November as Kiss Kiss Bang Bang and "captured the band's sound in all its blistering glory".

In September 1986 Couvret was replaced by Rudy Morabito (ex-Amused) on bass guitar and Jacquet by Paul Larsen (a.k.a. Paul Loughhead) on drums (Funhouse, Gun Control). Couvret later played with Lime Spiders and Jacquet joined Voodoo Lust, then Mushroom Planet. The Celibate Rifles toured Europe and, during June 1987, recorded their next studio album, Roman Beach Party, in Weesp, Netherlands. It appeared in September with Steedman and Rene Roth producing. Sounds magazine's Roger Holland described the songs as showing the group's "sawn off rock potential all the way down to the bleached white of the bone, the lyrics reveal all the anger, insight and humour that makes [them] one of the most powerful rock bands in the world today". In 1988 Morabito was replaced by Jim Leone (No Man's Land). The Celibate Rifles' next release on Hot Records was a 12-inch EP featuring a cover of Patti Smith's "Dancing Barefoot" (May 1988).

The Celibate Rifles signed to True Tone Records and, in April 1989, they issued Blind Ear. Steve Gardner of Noise for Heroes praised the album, "[l]yrically the band are obviously sharpening their focus on what ought to be fixed in the world, which is a great thing in my book ... there's nothing better than words that cut set to music that rips [...] they are aware of global problems, and they're also aware of personal problems, and they sing about both with equal perception". It contained several singles, "Johnny" (February 1989), "O Salvation!" (June) and a double 7-inch with five tracks "Wonderful Life", "5 Lamps", "Where the Action Is", "She's So Fine", and "Hot Stuff" (March 1990). The band contributed a cover of John Paul Young's "Where the Action Is" to radio station 3RRR's Various Artists album, Used and Recovered By (1990). In October that year Hot Records issued a compilation album, Platters du Jour (English: Records of the Day), which featured a selection of rare early singles and EP sides with a limited edition 7-inch EP containing three unreleased tracks.

The band members undertook further side projects between 1988 and 1993. In June 1988 Lovelock issued his debut solo album It's a Wig Wig Wig Wig World followed by a single, "Disco Inferno" in April 1990. His second solo album, Fishgrass was released in December 1991. Lovelock has also been a sports commentator on SBS TV show, The World Game covering football. In 1989 Steedman formed a rock duo, Crent, with Chris Townend from Kiss My Poodles Donkey. Crent issued the singles, "A.I.D.S." (1989) and "9K.?" (1990) plus the mini-album Crent (1990) on Waterfront Records. Crent issued a second album, Pink Album, on the Shagpile label (through Shock) at the end of 1993. Steedman also guested on bass guitar with Ed Kuepper's band The Aints, playing on their live album, S.L.S.Q. (1991). Meanwhile Larsen and Leone joined Roddy Rayda and The Surfin' Caesars for the album Orgazmatazz (1991).

In October 1990, Larsen had left The Celibate Rifles to join The Screaming Tribesmen, he was replaced by Nik Rieth on drums. At the end of 1991, the group signed to Festival Records and in March 1992 they issued a double album, Heaven on a Stick, which was produced by Rob Younger (vocalist for Radio Birdman). Andrew Stafford was disappointed by "a slight letdown, and while it has its high spots, there's nothing on this album (with the possible exception of "Electric Flowers") as immediate as the best of Blind Ear". The single "Groovin' in the Land of Love" (December 1991) peaked at number 123 on the ARIA Chart. The latter had tracks by fellow Sydney hard rockers, Hard-Ons, to coincide with a joint Australian tour the two bands undertook mid-year. The Celibate Rifles' tracks were "5 Lamps" and "Electric Flowers". The group then embarked on the Live Stick '92 world tour across the UK, Europe and the US. Festival issued a second, double 7-inch single from Heaven on a Stick, "Cold Wind", in May 1992.

Late in 1992 Hot Records issued re-mastered CD versions of the band's first five albums. The group returned to Hot Records which released Yizgarnnoff (May 1993) – a second live album – and Sofa – a 20-track compilation (December 1993). In late 1993, Rieth and Steedman joined Deniz Tek to record his album, Outside (1994). Rieth and Steedman toured with The Deniz Tek Group over the next few years and recorded another album in 1996, Le Bonne Route. In April 1994 The Celibate Rifles issued Spaceman in a Satin Suit which according to McFarlane "was [their] best studio album since Blind Ear". It was produced by Phil Punch and Paul Tagg. The band contributed a cover of The Sports' "Boys! (What Did the Detective Say?)" to the various artists project Earth Music. It appeared on the Eternally Yours ... for Earth Music EP (August 1994) along with Died Pretty covering Laughing Clowns' "Eternally Yours" and Painters and Dockers doing Mental as Anything's "The Nips Are Getting Bigger". In 1995 Hot Records released a video album, Scratch? My Arse! on VHS, which includes ten tracks by The Celibate Rifles and five Lovelock solo tracks.

In September 1996 Hot Records issued a compilation album, On the Quiet, as a selection of acoustic re-workings of previously released material. It was produced by Rodney Ellis and Steedman. It came with a limited edition bonus all-electric EP of Australian covers. In November 2000 the group issued their eighth studio album, A Mid-Stream of Consciousness. Allmusic's Mark Deming applauded the release, "[it] makes it clear this band has lost nothing in the way of flash, fire, or smarts during their time away from the studio. If you're looking for lean and mean rock & roll, The Celibate Rifles have still got it in spades". On 19 July 2004 the group's ninth studio album, Beyond Respect, was issued. J T Lindroos writing for Allmusic found "[i]t's no small feat that Lovelock's vocals manage to echo the distinct mannerisms of both Iggy Pop and Jim Morrison while still sounding original". On 18 August 2007 they released a 5×CD compilation box set, Ten Thousand Days, on Shock Records. In August 2011 The Celibate Rifles headlined the Big Freeze concert. Mess+Noise's Max Easton described their appearance at the Golden Plains Festival in Meredtih in March 2012, as "one of the festival's most successful dips into the past. Their appearance was chaotic ... with a set of Aussie garage classics, including the blistering song that broke them, 'Johnny'".

The Celibate Rifles announced that they would perform no longer, following the death of lead singer Damien Lovelock on 3 August 2019, with the exception of a tribute show to him in November 2019. On 1 January 2020 The Celibate Rifles released a new single 'I'm Gonna Try' which was a song recorded during Lovelock's final studio session prior to his death.

== Discography ==
=== Studio albums ===
List of albums, with selected chart positions
Title	Album details	Peak chart positions
Title	Album details	AUS
Sideroxylon	Released: 1983; Label: Hot Records HOT 1001	-
The Celibate Rifles (a.k.a. 5 Languages)	Released: April 1984; Label: Hot Records HOT 1007	-
The Turgid Miasma of Existence	Released: June 1986; Label: Hot Records HOT 1024	-
Roman Beach Party	Released: September 1987; Label: Hot Records HOT 1030	-
Blind Ear	Released: April 1989; Label: True Tone Records TLP 792077	-
Heaven on a Stick	Released: March 1992; Label: Festival Records L30736	51
Spaceman in a Satin Suit	Released: April 1994; Label: Hot Records HOT 1047	124
A Mid-Stream of Consciousness	Released: November 2000; Label: Oracle Records ODCD303	-
Beyond Respect	Released: 19 July 2004; Label: MGM Distribution CRCD3012	-

=== Compilation albums ===
Title	Details
Quintessentially Yours – (UK compilation of Sideroxylon and But Jacques, the Fish?)	July 1985, (What Goes on Records RIFLE1)
Mina Mina Mina – (UK compilation of Sideroxylon and 5 Languages)	August 1986, (What Goes on Records GOES ON 5)
Platters du Jour – (Compilation of released singles)	October 1990, (Hot Records HOT1033/34)
Sofa – (Compilation album of first five studio albums)	June 1993, (Hot Records HOT1043)
On the Quiet – (Acoustic re-workings of previous songs)	September 1996, (Hot Records HOT1067)
Wonderful Life – (Brazilian best of compilation album)	1997, (Tronador Records WOM TR001)
Ten Thousand Days	18 August 2007

=== Live albums ===
Title	Details
Kiss Kiss Bang Bang – (Recorded on 12 July 1986 at CBGB, New York City)	November 1986, (Hot Records HOT 1029)
Yizgarnnoff – (Recorded at Promises, Sydney and CBGB, New York City)	May 1993, (Hot Records HOT 1041)
Meeting the Mexicans – (Recorded at The Thornbury Theatre, Melbourne in 2017)	March 2018, (Laneway Music)

=== Extended plays ===
- But Jacques, the Fish? (March 1982), Custom
- The Turgid Miasma of Existence (June 1986, bonus three-track EP for first 500 copies of the album), Hot Records
- Dancing Barefoot (May 1988), Hot Records
- Wonderful Life (March 1990, double 7-inch with four tracks)

=== Charted singles ===
List of charted singles (in the top 200), with selected chart positions
Title	Year	Chart positions
Title	Year	AUS
"Johnny"	1989	128
"O Salvation!"	1989	123
"Wonderful Life"	1990	138
"Groovin' in the Land of Love"	1991	123
"Cold Wind"	1992	138

== Band members ==
Members

- Damien Lovelock – lead vocals (1980–2019)
- Kent Steedman – lead guitar, backing vocals (1979–2019)
- Dave Morris – rhythm guitar, backing vocals (1979–2019)
- Paul Larsen (a.k.a. Paul Loughhead) – drums (1986–1991, 2001–2019)
- Jim Leone – bass guitar, backing vocals (1988–2001, 2011–2019)
- Michael Couvret – bass guitar, backing vocals (1979–1982, 1984–1986, 2001–2011)
- Phil Jacquet – drums (1979–1986)
- Ian Martin – vocals (1979–1980)
- James Darroch – bass guitar, backing vocals (1982–1984) (died March 1986)
- Rudy Morabito – bass guitar, backing vocals (1986–1988)
- Nik Rieth – drums (1991–2001)
