= Radios Appear =

Studio album by Radio Birdman
- Released: July 1977
- Recorded: 1976–77
- Studio: Trafalgar Studios, Sydney
- Genre: Punk rock, hard rock
- Length: 37:08
- Label: Trafalgar
- Producer: John Sayers; Charles Fisher

Radio Birdman chronology
Burn My Eye; EP (1976)	Radios Appear (1977)	Living Eyes (1981)

Radios Appear is the first full-length studio album by Australian punk rock band Radio Birdman. The album was recorded at Birdman's Trafalgar Studios, Sydney, during 1976 and 1977. Trafalgar initially distributed the album via mail order and by sales from the backs of friend's and band members' station wagons. This laid the groundwork for future DIY punk bands in Australia. Radios Appear was hailed by many as a breakthrough album in Australian rock and a decisive change from the uneventful early mid-seventies scene.

The album's title was taken from the song "Dominance and Submission" by Blue Öyster Cult, one of the band's most important early influences.

== Critical reception ==
Professional ratings
Review scores
Source	Rating
AllMusic	4.5/5 stars

Radios Appear was ranked the third best Australian album of all time in a 2008 list compiled by Melbourne newspaper The Age. In October 2010, it was ranked no. 13 in the book 100 Best Australian Albums.

== Track listing ==
=== 1977 original (Trafalgar version) ===
All songs written by Deniz Tek, except where noted.

1. "TV Eye" (Dave Alexander, Ron Asheton, Scott Asheton, Iggy Pop) (The Stooges cover)
2. "Murder City Nights"
3. "Anglo Girl Desire"
4. "Man with Golden Helmet" (Dennis Tek / S. Kambly)
5. "Descent into the Maelstrom"
6. "Monday Morning Gunk"
7. "Do the Pop" (Dennis Tek / Mark Sisto)
8. "Love Kills"
9. "Hand of Law"
10. "New Race"

=== 1978 overseas release (sire version) ===
All songs written by Deniz Tek, except where noted.

1. "What Gives?" (Tek, Warwick Gilbert) – 2:22
2. "Non-Stop Girls" – 2:40
3. "Do the Pop" (Tek, Mark Sisto) – 2:30
4. "Man with Golden Helmet" – 5:37
5. "Descent into the Maelstrom" – 4:22
6. "New Race" – 2:35
7. "Aloha Steve and Danno" (Rob Younger, Denis Tek, Mort Stevens) – 3:57
8. "Anglo Girl Desire" – 3:04
9. "Murder City Nights" - 2:22
10. "You're Gonna Miss Me" (Roky Erickson) (13th Floor Elevators cover) – 2:25
11. "Hand of Law" – 4:44
12. "Hit Them Again" (Tek, Ron Asheton) – 4:32

=== 1995 reassembled and remastered version ===
1. "Aloha Steve & Danno"
2. "Non Stop Girls"
3. "Anglo Girl Desire"
4. "What Gives"
5. "Murder City Nights"
6. "Man with Golden Helmet"
7. "Descent into The Maelstrom"
8. "Do the Pop"
9. "Hand of Law"
10. "New Race"
11. "Love Kills"
12. "Monday Morning Gunk"
13. "Hit Them Again"
14. "TV Eye" (Dave Alexander, Ron Asheton, Scott Asheton, Iggy Pop) (The Stooges cover)
15. "You're Gonna Miss Me" (Roky Erickson) (13th Floor Elevators cover)

== Charts ==
Chart (1977)	Peak position
Australia (Kent Music Report)	51

== Personnel ==
Radio Birdman

- Rob Younger – lead vocals
- Deniz Tek – guitar, backing vocals
- Chris Masuak – guitar; piano on "Descent into the Maelstrom", backing vocals
- Warwick Gilbert – bass
- Ron Keeley – drums
- Pip Hoyle – organ, piano

with:

- Ron Asheton – co-writer for "Hit Them Again"

== See also ==
- Protopunk
- Australian indie rock
