= Wylde Ratttz =

American punk rock supergroup

- Genres: Punk rock
- Past members: Ron Asheton; Thurston Moore; Mark Arm; Mike Watt; Steve Shelley; Don Fleming; Sean Lennon; Jim Dunbar

Wylde Ratttz were an American punk rock supergroup. Composed of Sonic Youth's Thurston Moore and Steve Shelley, Ron Asheton (The Stooges), Don Fleming (Gumball), bassist Mike Watt (Minutemen), Jim Dunbar, and Mark Arm (Mudhoney) the band provided the music for Ewan McGregor's Curt Wild character in the film Velvet Goldmine.

An alternate version of the group's cover of "T.V. Eye", with lead vocals by Arm, also appeared in 2003's School of Rock.

In April 2020, the band released an album with proceeds going to The Ron Asheton Foundation. The tracks had been recorded in New York city in 1997 after the production of the film soundtrack, when Arm and Moore convinced their manager to lobby for the band to record and tour. The album featured ten tracks, with lead vocals handled by Arm, Moore, Watt and Asheton on different songs. Sean Lennon contributed to the sessions and features on the album.

Later that year the band released a cover of The Stooges' song "Fun house" to celebrate the 50th anniversary of the Fun House album. The recording featured the lineup of Asheton, Moore, Watt, Shelley, Arm on vocals and Sabir Mateen on tenor saxophone.

Between June and September 2020 the band released six tracks recorded during a three-hour improv session in 1997 featuring a line-up of Asheton, Lennon, Moore, Shelley and Watt.

== Discography ==
Appearances:

- Velvet Goldmine (soundtrack, 1998) - only "T.V. Eye" with Ewan MacGregor on vocals.

Albums:

- Wylde Ratttz (Digital album, 2020)

Singles/EPs:

- Flow/Judy's Blues (Digital single, 2020)
- Gas huffer/Pipe (Digital single, 2020)
- Fun house (Digital single, 2020)
- Smoke/Stiff (Digital single, 2020)
