= New Race =

- Origin: Sydney, Australia
- Genres: Alternative punk rock, indie rock, garage, proto-punk
- Years active: 1981
- Past members: Rob Younger; Ron Asheton; Deniz Tek; Warwick Gilbert; Dennis Thompson

New Race was a Detroit rock–styled supergroup based in Sydney, Australia, formed in April 1981. New Race was a concept band featuring three members of Radio Birdman: Deniz Tek, Rob Younger, and Warwick Gilbert, along with their inspirational mentors: Ron Asheton of The Stooges, and Dennis "Machine Gun" Thompson of MC5.

New Race played one tour of the East Coast of Australia, which consisted of seventeen shows. Many of these shows were recorded in anticipation of a live album at the end of the tour, and it was these recordings which formed the band's only "official" album, The First and the Last. There are two quality "bootleg" albums, also from these recordings, released on French label Revenge Records. The three albums include Radio Birdman originals, songs from the MC5 and The Stooges, and songs from Deniz Tek's post-Birdman band, The Visitors, and Asheton's post-Stooges band, Destroy All Monsters, along with one original song, "Columbia", credited to the entire band.

At the conclusion of the tour, both Ron Asheton and Dennis Thompson returned to the United States to pursue new musical avenues.

== Tour dates and venues ==
The tour consisted of 17 bookings:

- April 21, 1981: Wollongong, Wollongong Leagues Club
- April 22: Lismore (NSW), Lismore RSL
- April 23: Grafton (NSW), Grafton RSL
- April 24: Mooloolaba (Qld), Thompson's Hotel
- April 25: Brisbane, University of Queensland refectory
- April 27: Sydney, Sundowner Hotel
- April 28: Sydney, Family Inn, Rydalmere.
- April 30: Melbourne, Armadale Hotel
- May 1: Melbourne, Bombay Rock
- May 2: Melbourne, Crystal Ballroom
- May 3: Adelaide, Thebarton Theatre
- May 5: Canberra, Ainslie Hotel
- May 6: Sydney, Selina's
- May 7: Sydney, Sylvania Hotel
- May 8: Sydney, Comb & Cutter Hotel
- May 9: Sydney, Manly Vale Hotel
- May 10: Sydney, Sgt Pepper's Rock Café

It is doubtful that all of the bookings (listed above) were actually completed. Some sources state that only 16 shows were actually played, and according to Deniz Tek and Dennis Thompson, there was an additional gig on the Gold Coast at The Playroom, soon after the Wollongong show. Tek commented: “The first show was a predictably rough event in Wollongong, a tough steel city down south... then drove overnight 1,000 km north to the Gold Coast, to The Playroom which is still sitting there on one of the prettiest beaches in the world”. According to Thompson: “When we arrived at the Gold Coast... I can’t remember if it was The Beenleigh Tavern or The Playroom ... the marquee out the front of the venue had us billed as Radio Birdman”. May 10, 2021: They definitely played at The Playroom at Tallebudgera on the Gold Coast on Friday Apr 24 1981. I was at this gig and met Dennis and Ron after. Also saw them the next night at the Queensland University Refectory in Brisbane.

== Members ==
- Rob Younger – lead vocals
- Ron Asheton – guitar
- Deniz Tek – guitar, backing vocals
- Warwick Gilbert – bass
- Dennis Thompson – drums, backing vocals

Additional personnel

- Chris Masuak – guitar (played some shows on the songs "Looking At You" & "Columbia")
- Clyde Bramley – backing vocals (overdubbed during the sessions for The First And The Last album)

== Discography ==
Release date	Title	Notes
1982	The First and the Last	vinyl LP
1983	The First and Last	German pressing vinyl LP
1983	Crying Sun/Gotta Keep Movin	vinyl single
1983	The First and Last	UK version vinyl LP
1989	The First to Pay	vinyl LP and CD
1989	Hail Columbia 45	green vinyl single, only 1000 copies pressed
1990	The Second Wave	vinyl LP and CD
1997	The First and Last Reissue	vinyl LP and CD
