= Distemper (album) =

Studio album by The New Christs
- Released: August 1989
- Recorded: Trafalgar Studios, Sydney, Australia; January 1989
- Studios: Garage rock; punk rock; post-punk; garage punk
- Length: 44:03 (LP); 50:13 (CD)
- Label: Blue Mosque/Citadel
- Producer: Rob Younger

Distemper is the first non-compilation album by The New Christs. It reached #1 on the Australian Alternative Charts.

== Reception ==
According to Sydney Morning Herald, the album received critical acclaim upon its release. Trouser Press noted the "dark, brooding" and "apocalyptic tone" of the album, writing that it is "nothing short of a 40-minute call to emotional jihad."

=== Legacy ===
Louder than War described the album as "rabid [and] incredibly feral", calling it "a classic case of an album being so definitive that it was hard to see how it could be bettered, despite the consistently high quality of subsequent New Christs’ albums." Mark Lanegan of The Screaming Trees named the album as an influence on his music, calling the album "catchy in a really weird way and [Rob Younger's] singing is so out there and unique. He works around the music and he’s really aggressive." The US website Fast 'n' Bulbous ranked it 83rd best album of the 1980s.

== Track listing ==
1. "No Way on Earth" (Rob Younger) 4:42
2. "There's no time" (Younger) 3:32
3. "Another Sin" (Jim Dickson, Nick Fisher, Charlie Owen, Younger) 3:33
4. "The March" (Owen, Younger) 5:28
5. "The Burning of Rome" (Younger) 5:14
6. "Afterburn" (Owen, Younger) 4:47
7. "Circus of Sour" (Owen, Younger) 3:56
8. "Coming Apart" (Younger) 2:55
9. "Bed of Nails" (Dickson, Younger) 6:26
10. "Love's Underground" (Dickson, Fisher, Owen, Younger) 3:14
11. "Disconnected" (Dickson, Younger) 6:26
12. "Headin' South" (Younger) 4:09

Tracks 11 and 12 only appear on the CD.

== Personnel ==
The New Christs

- Rob Younger – Lead Vocals
- Charlie Owen – Guitar, Piano, Organ
- Jim Dickson – Bass, Vocals
- Nick Fisher – Drums

with

- Louis Tillett – Piano, Organ (1,5,10)
