= Burn My Eye =

EP by Radio Birdman
- Released: October 1976
- Recorded: 1976
- Studio: Trafalgar Studios, Sydney
- Length: 11:32
- Label: Trafalgar
- Producer: John Sayers, Charles Fisher

Radio Birdman chronology
Burn My Eye (1976)	Radios Appear (1977)

Burn My Eye was the debut EP recorded by Sydney punk rock band Radio Birdman, in October 1976. It was a low-budget EP recorded at Trafalgar Studios, Sydney and released on the studio's own Trafalgar label after the band had been rejected by many other labels. Part of the reason that many labels were reluctant to sign the band was because of their unconventional sound, which was quite different from the music then popular in the Australian rock scene during the 1970s.

The members of Birdman were not impressed with the acoustics of Trafalgar, a typical 1970s studio which they described as "dead sounding and quiet", in contrast to the high tempo, hard-rock sound for which Birdman is known. To the sound engineers' horror, Birdman decided to alter the studio's sound more to their liking by hauling sheets of corrugated iron from nearby demolition sites up the stairs of the studio and covering the walls with them to 'lighten up the sound'.

Birdman also experimented with some other unconventional sounds on the EP, such as the smashing of VB cans on their heads, as a percussion instrument throughout the recording.

The Burn My Eye EP was only produced once and has not been re-issued, so original copies of the EP are extremely rare. All tracks from the EP appear on the bonus disk of the 2015 CD reissue of the Trafalgar version of their first album, Radios Appear.

== Track listing ==
1. "Smith and Wesson Blues"
2. "Snake"
3. "I-94"
4. "Burned My Eye"

== Personnel ==
Radio Birdman

- Rob Younger - lead vocals
- Chris Masuak - guitar, vocals, piano
- Deniz Tek - guitar, vocals
- Warwick Gilbert - bass
- Ron Keeley - drums

== See also ==
- Proto-Punk
