= Rob Younger =

Australian musician, songwriter and producer

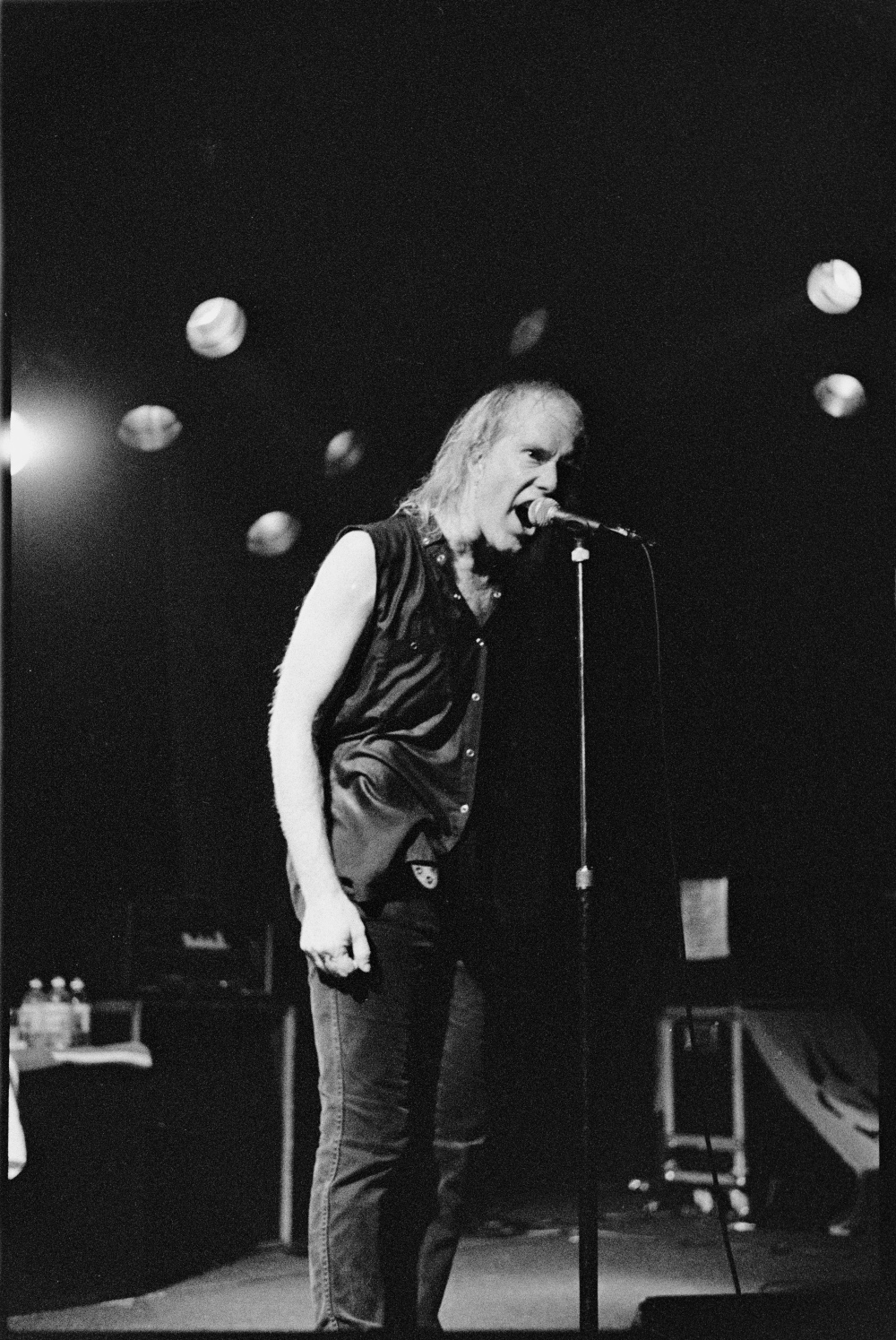
- Younger during a performance by Radio Birdman in Melbourne in 1996.

Background information
- Born: Robert Kent Younger; Sydney, New South Wales, Australia
- Genres: Punk rock; indie rock
- Occupations: Musician; producer
- Instrument: Vocals
- Years active: 1974–present
- Labels: Citadel: The Rats; Radio Birdman; New Christs; New Race

Rob Younger (born Robert Kent Younger) is an Australian rock musician, vocalist, songwriter and producer. He is a founding mainstay of the punk rock group Radio Birdman, and he is a pioneer of the local independent music scene. Radio Birdman, formed with Deniz Tek on guitar in November 1974, was one of the first punk rock bands ever formed in Australia, and it is considered one of the most influential and crucial bands in Australian music history. Younger formed a short-term super-group, New Race, in 1981. He also formed New Christs in that year, who is still active today.

Younger undertook production work, particularly with bands on the Citadel Records label. He has teamed up with the label's engineer-producer, Alan Thorne, and has worked independently in Australia and Europe. Younger and Radio Birdman are cited as influential by various rock artists, including The Hives and Silverchair. At the ARIA Music Awards of 2007, Daniel Johns of Silverchair announced the induction of Radio Birdman into the ARIA Hall of Fame.

== Biography ==
Rob Younger was lead vocalist of the Rats in 1974 alongside Warwick Gilbert on guitar, Mick Lynne, Ron Keeley on drums and Carl Rourke on bass guitar. They played cover versions of material by New York Dolls, the Stooges, and Velvet Underground. Younger shared a house with fellow musician, Deniz Tek, who was a member of TV Jones. Younger, Keeley, Rourke and Tek on lead guitar formed a punk rock group, Radio Birdman, in Sydney in November 1974 with Philip "Pip" Hoyle on keyboards. Rourke was soon replaced on bass guitar by Gilbert. Fellow Australian musician, and some-time rock music journalist, Vince Lovegrove, observed, "[they] turned the volume up full bore on their amplifiers, screamed out about revolution into the microphones, raised clenched fists in the air and in the process heralded in a brand new era for Australian rock'n'roll music."

The group's debut four-track extended play, Burn My Eye, appeared in October 1976. It was followed by their debut studio album, Radios Appear, in July 1977. Younger co-wrote a track, "Aloha Steve and Danno", for the international version, which appeared early in the following year. However, the group disbanded in June 1978. According to Australian musicologist, Ian McFarlane, "From the outset, [they] played an Americanised brand of rock'n'roll that was totally honest and totally committed... Although generally loathed and shunned by the mainstream music industry of the day... [as] one of the most potent rock bands ever to emerge from Australia, [they] holds pride of place as THE cult band of the last 25 years. The band's iconoclastic approach, uncompromising do-it-yourself ethos and outsider status in the face of overwhelming hostility remain the stuff of legend."

Younger formed the Other Side in 1978 with Clyde Bramley on bass guitar and Charlie Georgees on guitar (ex-the Hellcats). and Mark Kingsmill (also ex-the Hellcats) Ron Keeley replaced Kingsmill on drums. The group disbanded in the following year. In 1980 Younger was involved in production work on a four-track extended play, The Visitors, by local punk group of the same name – which included former bandmates Hoyle, Keeley and Tek.

The New Christs were formed in 1980 as a hard rock group by Younger and Bramley (ex-the Hitmen) with Bruce "Cub" Callaway on guitar (X-Men, the Saints), John Hoey on keyboards (X-Men) and Don McGloneon on drums (Bedhogs). The line-up never performed live but released a single, "Face a New God" (1981), which was co-written by Younger and Callaway. McFarlane described it as "searing acid-punk" which has "since emerged as one of the most collectable artefacts of the Australian punk/new wave era." The group disbanded later that year.

Early in 1981 Younger, Gilbert and Tek formed a short-term punk super-group, New Race, with Ron Asheton (of the Stooges, Iggy Pop Band) on guitar, and Dennis "Machine Gun" Thompson (of MC5) on drums. They toured Australia's east coast during April and May and recorded a live album, The First and Last, which was issued posthumously in the following year. It was co-produced by Younger with Charles Fisher and Alan Thorne. McFarlane felt it was "one of the greatest live albums in the history of Australian rock'n'roll... hard'n'fast Detroit rock'n'roll at its very best, with Tek and Asheton's incendiary guitar interplay well to the fore."

The New Christs reformed in June 1983 with Younger joined by Kingsmill, Chris Masuak on guitar and Tony Robertson on bass guitar (all from the Hitmen) and Kent Steedman on guitar (also in the Celibate Rifles). The group, according to AllMusic's Geoff Ginsberg, "have managed to persevere through many personnel changes, as well as Younger's many commitments producing other bands." They issued five studio albums, Distemper (1989), Lower Yourself (1997), We Got This! (2002), Gloria (May 2009) and Incantations (2014).

Younger had teamed up with the Celibate Rifles on a live four-track EP, Rob Younger and the Celibate Rifles (1991), which was recorded in July 1988 at one of that group's performances in Backnang, Germany. He had joined them on stage to provide vocals for cover versions of "I-94" (originally by Radio Birdman), "She's so Fine" (The Easybeats), "Shakin' All Over" (Johnny Kidd & the Pirates) and "It's a Long Way to the Top (If You Wanna Rock 'n' Roll)" (AC/DC).

In April 1997 he was interviewed by Lovegrove: he described his recent work with New Christs and as a producer for other artists, "Yeah, I haven't done anything exceptionally odd, just work in studios, written songs and produced bands. I've got a family to support, a little girl aged 18 months and a four year old boy, so I've even had to work a few day jobs at various times. The band doesn't have a big audience in Australia, so I'm champing at the bit to do this European tour. I think the lack of commitment on our part over the past few years hasn't helped our Australian following, so we've had a real slump. But a band's only as good as the songs that it writes, and we've got some good songs at the moment. We can rock, we know how to rock".

Younger has participated in reformations of Radio Birdman in 1996 and the following year; they reunited sporadically thereafter. In July 2007 the group were inducted into the ARIA Hall of Fame. They had refused an earlier nomination in the previous year but relented according to Shane Pinnegar, "to pacify friends & family who wanted to see them acknowledged for their contribution to Australian rock n’ roll." Younger reflected, "I didn't really want to accept [the Aria] because I didn't think the music business was ever really on our side, but there were people that did help us out, whether they were journalists or the odd agent or whatever. But generally, of course, I was always on my high horse about what assholes most of the people in the music business were, but I was just scattering my antipathy around at the world really. I don't know where it all fell, whether it landed on the right people or anything like that."

== Production work ==
Title	Artists	Details
Phantom EP	The Visitors	1980 EP, Phantom Records
The First and the Last	New Race	August 1982, WEA
The Name of the Game	City Kids	1983
City Kids	City Kids	1984
Next to Nothing	Died Pretty	August 1985 EP, Citadel Records
Strange Device	The Melting Skyscraper	1985, Waterfront Records
Love Will Grow	The Stems	February 1986 EP, Citadel Records
Long Live The New Flesh!	The Eastern Dark	1986
Destroy Dull City	The Psychotic Turnbuckles	August 1986 EP, Rattlesnake Records
Free Dirt	Died Pretty	August 1986, Citadel Records
"Indignation"	Porcelain Bus	August 1986, Citadel Records
The Orphans Parade	City Kids	1986
Long Sweet Dreams	Playmates	1986
In the Pouch	Joeys	1987
This Is the Planet	Meera Atkinson	1987
Vital Hours	Fixed Up	1987 EP
Lost	Died Pretty	June 1988, Blue Mosque/Festival Records
Home Sweet Home	Asylum	1988
Out	Happy Hate Me Nots	1988
Headcleaner	Lime Spiders	1988, Virgin Records
Taste This!	Bits of Kids	1989 EP
Have no More	Toys Went Berserk	1989 EP
Wired	Horny Toads	1989 EP
Distemper	New Christs	August 1989, Blue Mosque/Citadel Records
The Smiler with a Knife	Toys Went Berserk	1989
Mindless	Thrust	1989
Sarah's not Falling in Love	The Plunderers	April 1990 EP, Citadel Records
The Mutated Noddys	The Mutated Noddys	1990
Da Da Da Da	Club Hoy	1991
Quit Slylarking	The Barbarellas	1991 EP
Fringe	The Barbarellas	1991 EP
Home Movie	The Plunderers	July 1991 EP, Citadel Records
The Lost Generation	The Trilobites	February 1992
Heaven on a Stick	The Celibate Rifles	March 1992, Festival Records
A Place to Live	Happy Hate Me Nots	1992
Dateless Dudes Club	Hard-Ons	May 1992, Waterfront Records/Festival Records
Formaldehyde	The Screaming Tribesmen	1993, Survival Records
"Caressing Swine"	Died Pretty	June 1993
Woe Betide	New Christs	1995 EP
Sold	Died Pretty	February 1996, Columbia Records
Lower Yourself	New Christs	1997, Citadel Records
Remember The River	Halfway (band)	November 2006, Laughing Outlaw Records
Cremation Day In The Court Of Miracles	Dimi Dero Inc.	2010
Hikikomori	HITS	March 2014
Transmission	The Volcanics	October 2015

Credits:
