= The Visitors (Australian band) =

- Origin: Sydney, Australia
- Genres: Alternative rock, punk rock, indie rock, garage rock, proto-punk
- Years active: 1978–1983, 1994
- Labels: Phantom (1980); Citadel (1983); Red Eye Records (1994)

The Visitors were an Australian rock band formed in 1978 after the breakup of popular punk rock band Radio Birdman. The songs were written by Deniz Tek but unlike many other Tek bands, Tek did not sing vocals in The Visitors. Instead the vocals were sung by long-time friend of the band Mark Sisto. The addition of Sisto's vocal alongside a predominantly ex-Birdman lineup, created what many believed as the next generation of Birdman, with a vocal which mirrored that of The Doors. They played only 12 shows in the Sydney area starting in late 1978 and continuing into August 1979.

== History ==
In 1978, when Deniz Tek and Rob Younger returned from the United States to Australia, their band Radio Birdman had taken heavy losses on the British tour which resulted in the dissolution of the band. Tek and Younger expected to reconstitute the band in Australia, but the damage done on the British tour was too great to repair. Ron Keely had already quit, Warwick Gilbert had said nothing but was expected to leave. What they didn't expect was Chris Masuak informing them, upon their return, that he would no longer play in the band, choosing instead to join the band The Hitmen.

Tek and Younger had decided that the days of Radio Birdman were over, as they felt there was no longer a critical mass of dedicated original members to work with. Younger stayed in Sydney where he formed the band The Other Side, whilst Tek relocated to Newcastle to finish his medical internship. He didn't play for about 6 months until the pain of withdrawal became too great and he began to collaborate with Mark Sisto, the old Birdman master of ceremonies and bodyguard who had remained loyal even after being unceremoniously ejected from the British tour a year earlier.

It was from an intense desire to play that the energy came to form The Visitors, the same desire fuelled the live performances and recording of the album. From 1978 to 1979 The Visitors were Deniz Tek on guitar, Mark Sisto on vocals, Ron Keeley on drums, Pip Hoyle on keyboards and Steve Harris on bass. Their style was a dark mixture. The band being 3/5ths Birdman, including the chief songwriter, was almost like the next phase of Radio Birdman had that band continued on. At the same time, the sound of the band was more like the early Birdman days with the single guitar plus keyboard format.

There was much more technical ability this time around. The music was hard and heavy, while maintaining a melodic sense unusual in those immediate post-punk days. The band was crushingly loud, the guitar stage setup being two 100 watt Marshall Super Lead heads pushed through 16 twelve inch speakers. This in small clubs! But with the top end rolled off and compression applied, the overall effect was survivable for the audience. Sisto brought a strong Doors influence. Visually they were striking, combining black clothing and shades with various dada/surrealist accoutrements.

The band reformed for two shows in Newcastle and Sydney December 2005 with a new rhythm section of Art and Steve Godoy (bass and drums respectively.) The pair were members of California punk band the Exploding Fucks Dolls and The Golden Breed, a power trio headed by Deniz Tek.

A new line-up convened in February 2008 and supported the Hitmen in Sydney and touring US band the BellRays in Brisbane. Tek, Sisto and Hoyle remained at the core with Andy Newman on bass and Nik Rieth on drums (ex-Celibate Rifles, Deniz Tek Group, Radio Birdman and Tumbleweed.) The band added sax player Jack Shanley as a new member. A mini tour of Wollongong, Sydney and Melbourne took place in August and September 2008 to coincide with the re-issue of their album on the Citadel label.

== Personnel ==
- Deniz Tek – guitar, backing vocals
- Mark Sisto – lead vocals
- Ron Keely – drums
- Pip Hoyle – keyboards
- Steve Harris – bass

== Discography ==
- Phantom EP (1980)
- The Visitors LP (1983)
- Visitation '79 LP (1994)
