= Chris Masuak =

Canadian-Australian musician (born 1959)

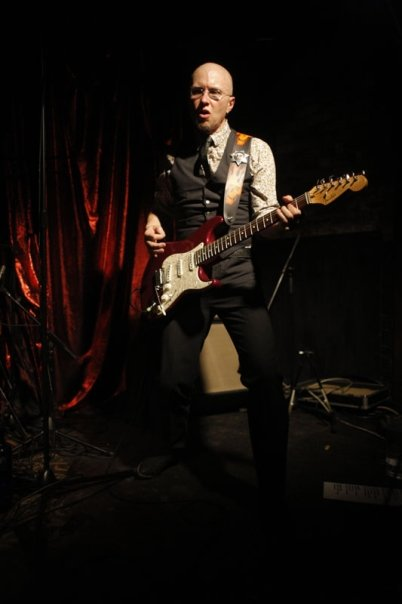
- Masuak with Hitmen DTK at the Cherry Bar, Melbourne in October 2009

Background information
- Also known as: Chris Boy King, Klondike
- Born: Christopher William Masuak; 1959 (age 66–67); Kamloops, British Columbia, Canada
- Origin: Sydney, New South Wales, Australia
- Genres: Punk rock, rock
- Occupation: Musician
- Instruments: Guitar, vocals, piano, percussion
- Years active: 1974–present
- Label: Rattlesnake
- Website: chrismasuak.net

Christopher William Masuak (born 1959) is a Canadian-born Australian musician, guitarist, songwriter and record producer. He joined the punk rock group Radio Birdman (1976–1978, 1995–1996, 1997, 2005–2007), then the hard rockers, the Hitmen (1978–1984, 1989–1992), and the Screaming Tribesmen (1984–1989). Masuak has also been a member of New Christs (1983–1984), the Juke Savages (1992–1996), the Raouls (1996–1997), and Klondike's North 40 (2002–2008). He currently plays with The Viveiro Wave Riders in his adopted country of Spain. He has released material as Chris Boy King and as Klondike. Radio Birdman were inducted into the ARIA Hall of Fame in July 2007.

== Biography ==
Christopher William Masuak, born in Kamloops, British Columbia, in Canada, migrated to Australia by 1974 as a teenager. His nickname of "Klondike" came from his Canadian youth. He attended Maroubra Bay High School. Masuak was a member of J.K. and the Can Openers in 1974 and then joined the Jackals alongside Rubin Acosta, Archie Archilles, Alf Azzopardi, Johnny Kannis and Steve Willman during 1974 and 1975.

According to Kannis the Jackals were "a school band that Chris Masuak and I started while we were in year 10 [with a] Maltese rhythm section." They played cover versions of material by Aerosmith, Alice Cooper, Blue Öyster Cult, Ted Nugent, Lou Reed and original country rock tracks written by Masuak, including "Death by the Gun". Kannis remembered that "Chris' guitar playing was so raw, original and his lead breaks took your head off!" After their third gig Masuak and Kannis met Deniz Tek of punk rockers, Radio Birdman, who jammed with them.

In late 1976 Masuak joined Radio Birdman replacing Philip "Pip" Hoyle on guitar, vocals and piano; fellow members were Warwick Gilbert on bass guitar, Ron Keeley on drums, Tek on guitar and vocals, and Rob Younger on lead vocals. They issued their debut four-track extended play, Burn My Eye, in October. They followed with their first studio album, Radios Appear, in July 1977. They disbanded in June 1978 after recording their second album, Living Eyes in April, which was issued posthumously in early 1981.

In November 1977, while still members of Radio Birdman, Masuak, Gilbert and Keeley, joined Kannis in Johnny and the Hitmen together with Charlie Georgees on guitar (ex-Hellcats). Early in 1978, when Radio Birdman were touring overseas, Kannis formed a new version of Johnny and the Hitmen which disbanded soon after. In July 1978, after Radio Birdman had dissolved, Masuak and Kannis revived the Hitmen with new members, Ivor Hay on drums (ex-the Saints) and Phil Sommerville on bass guitar. Gilbert rejoined in September, initially on rhythm guitar and took over bass guitar when Summerville left in the following year.

Greg Falk of The Canberra Times caught a gig by the Hitmen in April 1979, they played "Hard and fast rock at an incredible volume became the norm for their presentation." Most of the group's material was written by Masuak or Gilbert. They released three singles ahead of their debut self-titled album in July 1981 on WEA Records. Earlier Masuak explained that for the album, "we should just do our best, be ourselves and play on it representing our songs the way they should be represented." They followed with a second album, It Is What It Is, in November 1982 but early in the next year they went into hiatus.

Back in 1980 Masuak produced a single, "Cool in the Tube", for Surfside 6, a briefly existing punk pop group with the line up of Jolyon Burnett on lead vocals, Catherine Courtenay on bass guitar, Toby Creswell on keyboards, Geoff Datson on guitar, John Hackett on drums, Greg Masuak on guitar and Richard McGregor on guitar. He also wrote and produced their next single, "Can't You See the Sign", in 1981.

In June 1983 Masuak teamed up with former Radio Birdman band mate, Younger, in a new line-up of his hard rock group, New Christs, with Mark Kingsmill on drums and Tony Robertson on bass guitar (both from a latter day version of the Hitmen) and Kent Steedman on guitar (also in the Celibate Rifles). They supported Iggy Pop on the Australian leg of his international tour. New Christs issued a single, "Like a Curse", in April 1984 before disbanding in the following month. In June Masuak and Kannis reformed the Hitmen with Kingsmill, Robertson and Richard Jakimyszyn on guitar (ex-Lime Spiders, New Christs). They recorded a live album, Tora Tora DTK, which was released in November, after they had disbanded.

Masuak, Kingsmill and Robertson all joined Mick Medew, on lead vocals and guitars, in July 1984, for a new line up of his rock band, the Screaming Tribesmen. Masuak had previously produced that group's 1983 single, "Igloo". By November Kingsmill and Robertson had left and were replaced by Michael Charles on drums and Bob Wackley (aka Bob Hood) on bass guitar (ex-Razar, The Buddies, Grooveyard). The group's debut studio album, Bones and Flowers, released in October 1987, was co-produced by Masuak with Alan Thorne (Hoodoo Gurus, The Stems). Masuak remained with the group until 1989.

While a member of the Screaming Tribesmen, Masuak undertook a side project, Chris Boy King and The Kamloops Swing, as a country rock group in 1986, which issued a four-track EP, Klondike, in the following year. The Kamloops Swing were Hay, Kannis and Sommerville. In 1989 he formed Klondike and the Kamloops Swing which released a six-track EP, Cowboy Angel. Helping him out on the EP were fellow Screaming Tribesmen, Wackley on bass guitar and Warwick Fraser on drums.

Masuak and Kannis reformed the Hitmen as Hitmen D.T.K. in April 1989 with Gye Bennetts on drums (ex-Terminal Twist, Johnny Kannis Explosion), Brad Ferguson on bass guitar (ex-Voodoo Lust) and Matt Le Noury on guitar (ex-Vampire Lovers, Flying Tigers). They issued a studio album, Moronic Inferno, in November 1991 – co-produced by Masuak and Andy Bradley – and disbanded early in the next year.

In April 1992 Masuak formed a country rock and R&B group, Juke Savages, with Ferguson on drums and Paul Larsen on bass guitar. They released a self-titled CD EP in December. Ferguson and Larsen were replaced by Red Porter on bass guitar and Gerard Presland on drums (ex-Hitmen DTK), late in the next year. They released their debut studio album, Pagan Rites and Big Juju on the Road to Ascension, in 1994.

Early in the following year Masuak worked with fellow Radio Birdman members to remaster and remix Radios Appear and Living Eyes for their CD versions. Alongside Masuak were Gilbert, Hoyle, Tek and Younger; Tek later recalled "we just realised it was pretty good to be together we've all stopped being psychotic, and we thought, 'Well, maybe we were a little bit hasty in terminating the association', because the music sounded pretty good, and we enjoyed each others' company." Radio Birdman reformed in 1996 for the Big Day Out tour and recorded a live album, Ritualism, which appeared in December.

In December 2005 Radio Birdman recorded a new album, Zeno Beach (26 June 2006), with the line-up of Masuak, Hoyle, Tek and Younger joined by Jim Dickson on bass guitar and Russell Hopkinson on drums (on loan from You Am I). The group were inducted into the ARIA Hall of Fame in July 2007. They broke up again in 2010.

Klondike's North 40 released their debut rock album, The Straight Path, on I-94 Bar Records in November 2007. Influenced in part by middle eastern ragas, Masuak was joined by soul singer Matt Sulman and bass player Red Porter.

Masuak re-joined a new line-up of the Hitmen in December 2007. National tours followed, including an appearance at Cherry Rock in Melbourne and an Australian run with Detroit punk rock diva, Niagara, as special guest. Masuak re-located to Spain in January 2010 with European tours lined up as guest guitarist with French band the Outside and Brazil-based Australian Simon Chainsaw, formerly of Sydney band Vanilla Chainsaws. Before leaving Australia he completed work on his album "Workhorse" which was released in 2011 on I-94 Bar Records.

In 2011, Masuak joined a reformed line-up of the Screaming Tribesmen for Australian shows, playing Brisbane, Melbourne and Sydney. The Bones and Flowers line-up toured Europe in 2012, playing Spain's Azkena Festival and four dates in France. In December 2013 and January 2014, Masuak played a string of solo band shows around Sydney.

With a box set released, Radio Birdman reformed in October–November 2014. Masuak was omitted from the line-up. He described his disappointment, "There is absolutely no professional or musical impediment or rationale to preclude me from participating in this event. Rather, this decision is a result of a last desperate and bullying demand from a singer who's [sic] animosity towards me has spanned decades and whose antipathy towards the band is well documented." Younger responded, "Are relations between the two of us simply unsalvageable? Yes – but I didn't exclude him from the band. He published a statement. I can understand why he'd be gutted by it, but my view is it would have been naive of him to think anything would've happened other than what has happened. I didn't exclude him from the band even though he thinks that's the case. I was offered to participate on the basis that he wasn't in the band."

In April 2016, Masuak released his new solo band CD, "Brujita", with his Spanish band The Viveiro Wave Riders on Australian label I-94 Bar Records. He followed this with "Address To The Nation" in 2019 on the same label.

In early 2023, Masuak announced an Australian East Coast tour in May and June, his first local run in six years. He will be backed by Dog Soldier, comprising Tony Bambach (Aberration, ex-Lime Spiders) on bass and Stuart Wilson (Leadfinger, ex-New Christs, ex-Lime Spiders) on drums. Masuak also began recording with one of his Spanish band, Los Revolaters, for a planned four-song EP.

== Discography ==
=== EPs ===
- Klondike 12" (by Chris Boy King and the Kamloops Swing) (1987) Rattlesnake RAT1204
- Cowboy Angel (by Klondike and The Kamloops Swing) (1989) Rattlesnake RAT1212

=== Singles ===
- Let the Kids Dance/Sweet Jane (by Chris Masuak and Deniz Tek) (1999) Undead 002 (1999)
- Another Lost Weekend (by Chris Masuak & Los Eternos) (1999) H-Records HR-061 (2013)
- Stone Cold Pity/Single White Male 7" (2014) Pitshark Records RIK049

=== CDs ===
- The Straight Path (by Klondike's North 40) (2007) I-94 Bar I94BAR-001
- Workhorse (by Chris "Klondike" Masuak and Klondike's North 40) (2011) I-94 Bar I94005
- Bruijita (by Chris Masuak and The Viveiro Wave Riders) (2016) I-94 Bar I94006
- Address To The Nation (by Chris Masuak and The Viveiro Wave Riders) (2019) I-94 Bar I94007

=== Digital ===
- Outtakes & Oddities (by Chris Masuak and The Juke Savages) (2020) I-94 Bar Digital
- Cowboy Angel and More (by Chris Masuak) (2020) I-94 Bar Digital
