= Ron Asheton =

American rock musician (1948–2009)

- Asheton in 1969

Background information
- Born: Ronald Franklin Asheton; July 17, 1948; Washington, D.C., US
- Died: c. January 6, 2009 (aged 60) Ann Arbor, Michigan, US
- Genres: Punk rock; heavy metal; hard rock; garage rock; proto-punk
- Occupations: Musician; songwriter
- Instruments: Guitar; bass guitar; vocals
- Years active: 1963–2009
- Labels: Elektra; Columbia; Virgin
- Formerly of: The Stooges; The New Order; Destroy All Monsters; New Race; Wylde Ratttz

Ronald Franklin Asheton (July 17, 1948 – c. January 6, 2009) was an American musician, best known as the guitarist, bassist, and co-songwriter for the rock band the Stooges. He formed the band along with Iggy Pop and his brother, drummer Scott Asheton, and bassist Dave Alexander in 1967. The band is regarded as the seminal proto-punk band and a major influence on the punk rock genre with the albums The Stooges (1969), Fun House (1970) and Raw Power (1973). Following break-ups in 1971 and 1974, the Stooges reformed in 2003 and Asheton remained with the band until his death from a heart attack on January 6, 2009. Asheton was inducted into the Rock and Roll Hall of Fame in 2010 as a member of the Stooges, and ranked as number 29 and 60 on Rolling Stone's list of 100 Greatest Guitarists of All Time in 2010 and 2015 respectively.

== Early life ==
Ronald Franklin Asheton was born July 17, 1948, in Washington, D.C. He described his family as his first big musical influence. His first instrument was a violin which was given to him by his mother. He was then gifted an accordion at age 5, which he practiced more seriously. At the age of 10 he took up both the guitar and the bass which ultimately took up the majority of his practice time and interest.

He described himself as a child who was different when compared to other kids his age, as the majority of the kids that lived in his area were more interested in sports and physical activities, while he spent his time listening to music and practicing his guitar and bass. When he was 13, the family relocated to Ann Arbor, Michigan. He and his brother, Scott, attended Pioneer High School.

He played with some local bands including the Prime Movers and The Chosen Few (briefly overlapping with James Williamson, later of the Stooges). He met Iggy Pop soon after and they formed the hard rock band the Stooges. Like his father who was a Marine, Ron had a strong interest in military history, including a controversial, albeit apolitical, obsession with collecting Nazi memorabilia.

== The Stooges ==
By 1967, Asheton was jamming with his brother Scott and friend Dave Alexander. They were soon joined by James "Iggy" Osterberg who remembered Asheton from the Chosen Few. The "Psychedelic Stooges" played their first show Halloween 1967. In 1968, they were signed to Elektra Records along with MC5 by Danny Fields. He played guitar on and wrote most of the music for their first two albums, debut album The Stooges (1969) and Fun House (1970). Shortly after recording Fun House, a second guitarist was added to the band, initially former roadie Bill Cheatham, who was shortly thereafter replaced by James Williamson. Infighting between Asheton and Williamson, whom he saw as usurping his role as songwriter and lead guitarist, as well as the toll of extensive drug use, caused the band to break up in 1971.

In 1972, David Bowie invited Pop and Williamson to London to reform the band and record a new album. Eventually, after being unable to find suitable local replacements, Pop invited the Asheton brothers to rejoin but with Ron on bass, a role Ron accepted only begrudgingly. The resulting album, Raw Power, sold poorly initially, but has since been seen as a seminal album in the development of what would later be called punk rock. Tensions and drug use had not gone away during the brief reunion, however, and the band would disintegrate again in February 1974. Several more releases continued sporadically during the next several decades, mostly recordings of live shows, album remixes, and collections of unreleased recordings, but the Stooges would not tour or record again during the 20th century.

When the Stooges reformed in 2003 he once again appeared as the band's guitarist. He stayed with the band until his death on January 6, 2009 and was replaced by Williamson.

== Post-Stooges ==
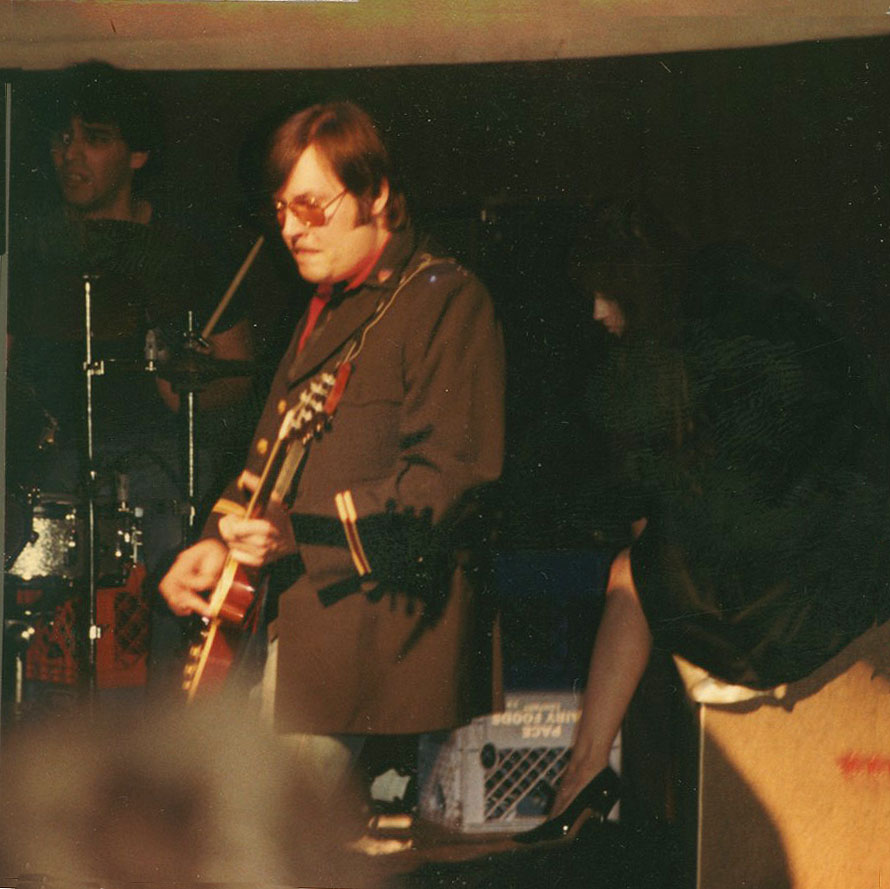
Asheton (center) performing with Destroy All Monsters in 1982

Apart from The Stooges, Asheton also played in the bands The New Order (not the UK band New Order), Destroy All Monsters, Dark Carnival, New Race and The Empty Set.

More recently he played with Wylde Ratttz, a band composed of some of punk and alt-rock's most renowned and respected musicians. The band included Mike Watt of Minutemen, J. Mascis of Dinosaur Jr., Thurston Moore of Sonic Youth, and Mark Arm of Mudhoney. It contributed a cover version of the Stooges song "T.V. Eye" to the soundtrack for the Todd Haynes film Velvet Goldmine, which starred Ewan McGregor and Jonathan Rhys Meyers. Asheton's final song "3 Stooges" appeared during the credits of the 2012 comedy film The Three Stooges.

Asheton also acted, appearing with The Texas Chain Saw Massacre star Gunnar Hansen in Mosquito, which was released 1995. He also appeared in two other films: Frostbiter: Wrath of the Wendigo and Legion of the Night.

Following the band's 1974 breakup, Ron Asheton returned to Ann Arbor, Michigan and spent most of the rest of his life living with his mother in her large house. He was an avid collector of horror movies, military history books and Nazi memorabilia and regalia, which included uniforms, medals, pins and a Nazi flag.

== Death ==
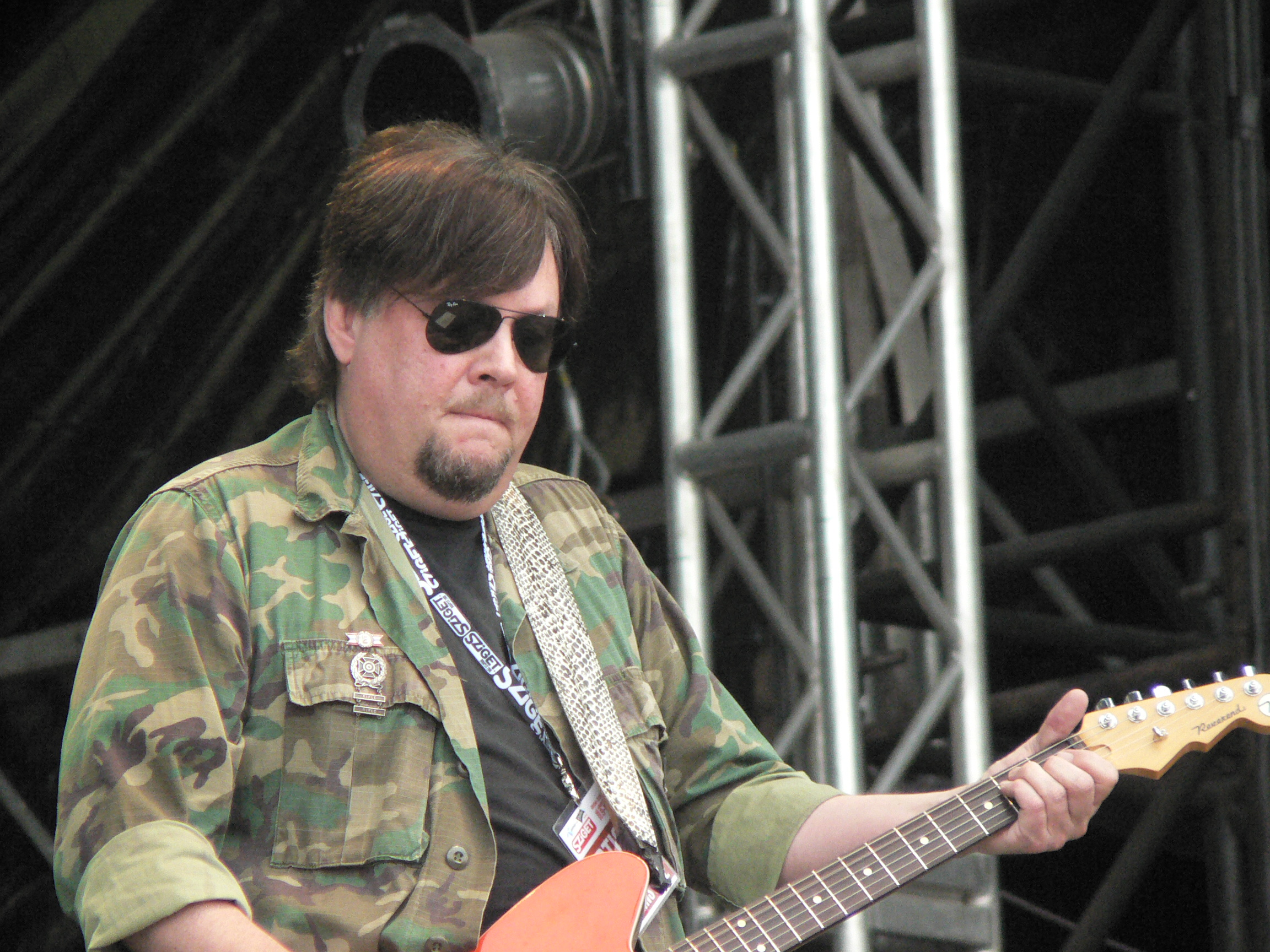
Ron Asheton playing at Sziget Festival in 2006, three years before his death

During the early hours of January 6, 2009, police were summoned to Asheton's home in Ann Arbor, Michigan, by his personal assistant, who had been unable to reach him for several days. Asheton was found dead in his bed, apparently having died of a heart attack. Sonic Youth's album The Eternal is dedicated to him.

His brother Scott died on March 15, 2014, also from a heart attack.

On July 17, 2018, for what would have been Asheton's 70th birthday, a tribute concert was held in his hometown of Ann Arbor, Michigan, featuring Mike Watt; Dinosaur Jr's J Mascis; Kim Gordon of Sonic Youth and Free Kitten; Mark Arm of Mudhoney; Jennifer Herrema of Royal Trux; Mario Rubalcaba of Hot Snakes; and Don Fleming of Gumball.

== Discography ==
With the Stooges

- The Stooges (1969)
- Fun House (1970)
- Raw Power (1973)
- The Weirdness (2007)

With The New Order

- New Order (1977)
- Victim of Circumstance (1989)
- Declaration of War (1990)

With Destroy All Monsters

- November 22, 1963 (1989)
- Bored (1999) – recorded in 1978

With New Race

- The First and the Last (1982)
- The First To Pay (1989)
- The Second Wave (1990)

With Dark Carnival

- Live - Welcome to Show Business (1990)
- Greatest Show in Detroit (1991)
- Last Great Ride (1996)
- HOTBOX Greatest Hits 6 Disc set (2006)

With The Empty Set

- Thin Slim & None/Flunkie (1996)

With Powertrane

- Ann Arbor Revival Meeting (2003)

Other contributions

Asheton played the double tracked guitar solo (referred to as a "guitar duet" in the liner notes) on Ragnar Kvaran's 1981 recording, Wrecked on Love.
He is credited for helping to write the song "Hit Them Again" on the album Radios Appear (1977) by Radio Birdman, as well as one track that can be heard at the end of the movie Mosquito. Some other tracks Asheton wrote had been recorded by the group "Wylde Ratttz", for the original score of the 1998 movie Velvet Goldmine, but only one song was featured on the soundtrack. He contributed another song to Beyond Cyberpunk, a 2001 compilation assembled and produced by Wayne Kramer of MC5.
