= Deniz Tek =

American singer (born 1952)

- Born: November 10, 1952 (age 74); Ann Arbor, Michigan, U.S.
- Genres: Hard rock, proto-punk, garage rock
- Occupations: Musician, composer, producer
- Instruments: Vocals, guitar
- Years active: 1972–present
- Labels: WEA, Citadel
- Website: www.deniztek.com

Deniz Tek (born November 10, 1952) is an American singer, guitarist and songwriter and a founding member of Australian rock group Radio Birdman. He has played in many of the underground rock bands of the 1970s, including Australian bands The Visitors and New Race, but is most known for exerting his burning Detroit-style guitar influence over the punk rock genre in Australia.

Tek was born and raised in Ann Arbor, Michigan, United States. He spent 1967 in Sydney with his family and was greatly attracted to the Australian landscape, moving there permanently in 1972 to commence his medical studies at University of New South Wales in Sydney. Tek is a trained ER doctor and ex-navy flight surgeon who currently splits his time working in emergency departments in hospitals in New South Wales and Hawaii while still taking time to record and tour.

== Biography ==
=== Early life ===
Tek was born to a Turkish father and an American mother and grew up in Ann Arbor, Michigan, a university town near Detroit where Tek was exposed to Motor City music icons such as MC5, The Stooges and The Rationals. In the late '60s Ann Arbor became somewhat of a nexus for rock music, hosting festivals which drew performers from all around the world such as Pink Floyd, Janis Joplin, Johnny Winter, Captain Beefheart, and a personal favourite of Tek's, The Rolling Stones. Headlining world acts such as The Rolling Stones aside, Tek was heavily influenced by the mushrooming local underground scene of Ann Arbor, which included bands such as The Frost, Mitch Ryder, Carnal Kitchen with Steve Mackay, The Up, The SRC plus jazz greats Pharoah Sanders, Sun Ra, Archie Shepp and Yusef Lateef. In 1971 Tek left the rock metropolis of Ann Arbor to pursue his medical studies in Sydney.

=== 1972–73 with TV Jones ===
In late 1972 Tek had joined the band TV Jones as lead singer/guitarist along with Chris Jones on guitar, Gerry Jones on drums (brother of the now successful jazz trumpet player Vince Jones), Giles Vanderwerf on bass. TV Jones had a fanatical cult following in Wollongong, to the point where things got crazed and dangerous where by in 1974, the group fled north of the city. The band was hopeful of success, but amid disastrous engagements at Chequers and the Whisky A Go Go, ran afoul of both the police and organised crime simultaneously. After unsuccessful album recording sessions in North Sydney, the group began to disintegrate, sacking Tek from TV Jones as a negative influence.

=== 1974–78 with Radio Birdman ===
After being dismissed from TV Jones, Tek proceeded to form a new band with longtime friend Rob Younger, with the addition of Chris Masuak, Warwick Gilbert, Pip Hoyle and Ron Keeley, and called themselves Radio Birdman, after a misheard Stooges lyric. Radio Birdman were arguably the most successful band that Tek was associated with, despite the band's initial shunning from the Australian music scene. The Radio Birdman sound was unconventional and raw and echoes the Motor City influences of Tek's youth. Birdman are often attributed with the initiation of the Australian indie rock scene, as after being repeatedly rejected from various clubs and bars in the Sydney area, Birdman took it upon themselves to record and release their first recording Burn My Eye, and distribute it out the back of the band members' station wagons. Radio Birdman began a world tour in 1977 travelling to England and playing a few shows around London as well as recording their second album Living Eyes, until in 1978 the band broke up mid-tour due to "personality conflict".

=== 1978–81 with The Visitors, Angie Pepper Band, and the New Race tour ===
Following the demise of Radio Birdman, Tek proceeded to experiment musically in several different bands. From 1978 to 1979 Deniz dabbled in a band called The Visitors with Deniz on guitar, Mark Sisto on vocals, Ron Keeley on drums, Pip Hoyle on keyboards and Steve Harris on bass. The band being 3/5ths Birdman members was often compared to the early sound that Birdman had, but with a new twist of the Sisto vocal which likened the sound to that of The Doors. During these years Tek had also committed to writing the songs for Angie Pepper's new band The Angie Pepper Band after the breakup of her more successful band The Passengers.

What has often been hailed as the ultimate Motor City supergroup New Race, was formed by Tek with fellow Birdman members Rob Younger, and Warwick Gilbert, along with guitarist from The Stooges, Ron Asheton, and the drummer of MC5, Dennis Thompson, for a once off tour along the east coast of Australia in 1981. The band performed to sold out shows and many bootleg recordings of the shows were made, which resulted in the formation of several bootleg releases. The only official live recording of the shows was released in 1982 by Birdman's Trafalgar Studios as The First and the Last.

=== The between years ===
Tek then moved back to America where he became a licensed physician, specialising his qualifications in emergency and aerospace medicine. When in America he is based in Montana.

Tek's brother was a pilot of F-16s in the USAF. Tek joined the US Navy as a flight surgeon, and trained as a pilot. He then served with the US Marines, and flew F-4 Phantoms in the squadrons VMFA-212 and VMFA-232. It was thought that his callsign of "Iceman" was noticed by producers of the Top Gun film during a research visit to the squadron and may have been appropriated for Val Kilmer's character in the film. However, Top Gun screenwriter Jack Epps clarified that he never encountered Tek during his time there, and that characters and callsigns were made original and not based on any single individual to prevent potential legality issues.

=== 1991 with The Deniz Tek Group ===
Encouraged by his friend and ex-Birdman compadre Chris Masuak, Deniz came back to Australia in 1991, intent on renewing himself musically. He began extensive touring in 1992 and, following a near career destroying disaster on the Take It To The Vertical tour of 1992 initiated a line-up that became known as The Deniz Tek Group. This line-up spent the next few years touring Europe, Australia and the US, while releasing an EP and several albums (Outside, 444 The Number Of The Beat, La Bonne Route) Geographical difficulties became untenable in late '96 and the group split up. Deniz then continued with US based lineups and recorded albums with Wayne Kramer (MC5, Dodge Main), skateboard stars Art and Steve Godoy (Golden Breed, The Last Of The Bad Men), a Montana-based trio (Equinox), an experimental electronic duo with Jimi Hendrix's sidekick and amplifier designer Dave Weyer (Glass Insects), east coast hard rockers (Deep Reduction and DR2 featuring Rob Younger), and live work including tours and live albums with the Rationals' Scott Morgan (Three Assassins, Powertrane) and surviving members of Sonic's Rendezvous Band (Getting There Is Half The Fun). Deniz and wife Angie Pepper (Passengers) recorded her album Res Ipsa Loquitor in 2001. Deniz continued to record and tour extensively in the late '90s, while Radio Birdman reunified and began to work again.

=== The reformation of Radio Birdman ===
Radio Birdman reformed in January 1996, with all original members, touring Australia extensively, including their headlining of the 1996 Big Day Out Tour. Critics and fans old and new expressed the belief that they more than lived up to the legend.

They recorded a "live" album, performed to an exclusive, invited audience of 24 and released this on CD as Ritualism. Initially it was only available by mail order on their own Crying Sun Records label, a low budget, but high quality DIY project which is consistent with their earlier work both sonically and philosophically.

Radio Birdman played and toured sporadically over the next ten years, losing the original drummer and bass player along the way. With Jim Dickson on bass and Rusty Hopkinson (You Am I) on drums, they played shows around Australia, returned to the recording studio in 2006, and released their first new studio album in 25 years, Zeno Beach. Zeno Beach was accompanied by a national tour of Australia and an extensive world tour, which included New Zealand, Europe, and for the first time ever, the United States. Radio Birdman again toured the world in 2007. In July 2007 Radio Birdman was inducted into the ARIA Hall of Fame.

=== Current projects ===
The Soul Movers is one of Deniz's latest musical projects (commenced 2008) with ex-Birdman member Pip Hoyle on keys, Andy Newman and Calvin Welch on drums with co-songwriter Lizzie Mack on vocals. On the Inside (Career/Cool Time Records) was released September 2009. In April 2011 Deniz joined with Iggy and the Stooges, as a special guest, for a tribute performance in Ann Arbor. The remainder of 2011 saw Tek recording a new solo album and touring with Art and Steve Godoy as the Golden Breed. 2013 saw Deniz team up with Scott Morgan (musician) and release the 3 Assassins album.

Tek and his wife run a Kona coffee farm in Hawaii, but he also performs around 50 concerts a year.

== Discography ==
=== Radio Birdman ===
Title	Release
Burn My Eye EP	1976
Radios Appear LP	1977
Living Eyes LP	1981
"Alone in the Endzone" 45	1981
Zeno Beach CD	2006
Live In Texas	2011

=== The Visitors ===
Title	Release
Phantom EP	1980
The Visitors LP	1983
Visitation '79 LP	1994
The Visitors CD	2008

=== New Race ===
Title	Release
The First and the Last	1982
The Second Wave	1990

=== Angie Pepper ===
Title	Release
Frozen World 7" single	1984
Its Just That I Miss You LP	2001
Res Ispa Loquitor LP	2003

=== The Deniz Tek Group ===
Title	Release
Outside LP	1994
4-4 The Number of The Beat EP	1995
Italian Tour EP	1996
Le Bonne Route	1996
Bad Road EP	1997
Citadel Years double CD compilation	2011

=== Deniz Tek solo ===
Title	Release
Orphan Tracks LP	1989
Good 'Nuff EP	1992
Take It to the Vertical LP	1992
Outside LP	1994
Equinox LP	1998
Got Live Live LP	1999
Detroit LP	2013
Can of Soup 7" Single	2014
Crossroads 7" Single	2014
Mean Old Twister LP	2016
Prison Mouse 7" Single	2017
Lost for Words LP	2018
Long Before Day LP	2022

=== Deniz Tek and Scott Morgan ===
Title	Release'
3 Assassins CD	2004

=== Soul Movers (Deniz Tek with Lizzie Mack) ===
Title	Release
Soul Movers LP	2009

=== Deniz Tek and The Golden Breed ===
Title	Release
Glass Eye World CD	2013

=== Deniz Tek and James Williamson ===
Title	Release
Acoustic K.O. 10" EP	2017
