= Lost (Died Pretty album) =

Studio album by Died Pretty
- Released: June 1988
- Recorded: Early 1987
- Studio: Trafalgar Studios, Sydney
- Genre: Rock
- Length: 46:25
- Label: Blue Mosque/Festival Records
- Producer: Rob Younger

Died Pretty chronology
Pre-Deity (1987)	Lost (1988)	Every Brilliant Eye (1990)

Singles from Lost
- 1. "Winterland" Released: October 1987; 2. "Towers of Strength" Released: June 1988; 3. "Out of My Hands" Released: November 1988

Professional ratings
Review scores
Source	Rating
Allmusic	4.5/5 stars

Lost is the second album by Australian rock band Died Pretty. It was released in 1988.

The album, produced by former Radio Birdman vocalist Rob Younger, became the second biggest-selling alternative album for 1988, behind Ed Kuepper's Everybody's Got To and ahead of The Church's Starfish. It yielded three singles, including "Winterland," the fourth best-selling alternative single for 1987.

The album's release was delayed for 18 months by protracted negotiations with Festival Records over a distribution deal. An expanded version, featuring the 1989 single "Everybody Moves," as well as B-sides and alternative versions, was released in 2013 by Sandman Records.

== Background and recording ==
The band entered Trafalgar Studios in early 1987, soon after returning home from a two-month, 70-date tour of Europe and the United States, physically exhausted but creatively energised. Keyboardist Frank Brunetti recalled: "Even though we weren't making much money out of it we could see that people were taking an interest, not just in Australia but in the States and Europe. There was demand from people to make another record." Bassist Mark Lock announced he would quit the band because he did not want to tour any more, but agreed to join them for the recording sessions while they searched for a replacement.

Myers said there was a determination to give the album more space and more light and shade than its predecessor. "A lot of the tracks on Free Dirt were very dense, everyone's playing flat out all the time. On Lost I wanted to shift that emphasis."

As part of that process, the band used singer Astrid Munday for backing vocals and former Cold Chisel keyboardist Don Walker on piano for the song "Free Dirt," which had been left off the debut album. Myers said: "I really liked the song itself and I wanted to give it another go." The band had hired Munday after hearing her vocals on Paul Kelly's "Before Too Long". The band asked for Walker's contribution when they saw him walking through Trafalgar Studios to collect some tapes. Myers said: "I thought what this song needs is some really beautiful piano and I was thinking "Flame Trees" and I went, 'hmmmm' ... Don had a listen to the song and he was very gracious ... he just went 'yeah, okay' and went into the studio and played the piano, did two takes and it was fantastic, just beautiful. It was exactly what I wanted."

The album's opening song, the title track, had been written by guitarist Brett Myers for his former Brisbane-based band, The End, and was the last to be recorded for the Lost sessions. Myers said the suggestion to record the song had come from Citadel Records owner John Needham, who had seen the band perform it at early Died Pretty gigs.

The first single released from the sessions, "Winterland"/"Wig-Out" (acoustic version) was released on Citadel Records in October 1987. The single reached No.1 on the independent chart and was accompanied by a video clip filmed in a disused rubble-strewn underground car park in Woolloomooloo, with new bassist Steve Clark miming to the bass line recorded by Lock. Needham was by then negotiating with Festival Records for a distribution deal for the album to maximise its chances for success and it was not until June the following year that Lost was finally released, along with a second single, "Towers of Strength"/"From a Buick 6." Both single and album debuted at No.1 on the independent charts.

The album cover featured a photo of a French woman, Sophie, taken by Robyn Stacey, the girlfriend of keyboardist John Hoey, who replaced Brunetti. Stacey's work also appeared on the covers of Every Brilliant Eye, Trace and Sold.

== "Everybody Moves" ==
By the time of its release, the band had undertaken a second European and US tour (December 1987 to February 1988) and replaced both Lock (October 1987) and Brunetti (April 1988).

But before Brunetti's departure they had recorded one last song, "Everybody Moves". Myers says he regrets that the song—written and originally recorded during the Free Dirt sessions in November 1985 and a mainstay of the band's subsequent live set—was not included on Lost. "We recorded 'Everybody Moves' [for Free Dirt)] but it didn't really jell in the studio ... we knew it was a strong song when we played it live, but we found it wasn't quite so strong when we recorded it in the studio. So we left it off. So in 1988 we were still waiting for the album to come out and we got really bored and went back into the studio to record and we thought, 'What song have we got?' We wanted to record a single and just stick that out; we thought it was a cute idea. So we recorded 'Everybody Moves'."

"Everybody Moves" was eventually released in April 1989—five months after Lost's third and final single, "Out of My Hands" (November 1988). But Myers says: "Lost is the proper home for 'Everybody Moves', we'd always wanted it to go on the second album, that's where it should have gone ... if we'd done the right thing and put it on the album and then released it as a single from the album it probably would have done a lot better." Brunetti describes it as "the best song we recorded while I was in the band. It's a beautiful song, it's perfect in and of itself. I'm glad it's got that stand-alone identity."

The song was included on Citadel's second compilation album, Positively Elizabeth Street (1989) and on the 2013 Sandman reissue of Lost. In July 2013 it was performed by Courtney Barnett and former Hoodoo Gurus singer-guitarist Dave Faulkner on the SBS TV show RocKwiz.

== Track listing ==
1. "Lost" (Brett Myers) – 3:05
2. "Out of My Hands" (Myers) – 4:18
3. "As Must Have" (Brett Myers, Ron Peno) – 3:38
4. "Springenfall" (Brett Myers, Ron Peno, S. Simpson) – 6:53
5. "Winterland" (Myers, Peno) – 4:28
6. "Caesar's Cold" (Myers, Peno) – 6:33
7. "Crawls-Away" (Myers, Peno) – 4:45
8. "One Day" (Myers) – 3:58
9. "Towers of Strength" (Myers, Peno) – 4:44
10. "Free Dirt" (Myers) – 4:03

=== 2013 Sandman expanded version ===
11. "Everybody Moves" (Myers, Peno) – 4:50 (single, March 1989)
12. "In Love Prison" (Myers, Peno) – 3:04 (B-side of "Everybody Moves" single)
13. "Wig-Out" (acoustic version) Myers, Peno) – 3:33 (B-side of "Winterland" single, October 1987)
14. "From a Buick 6" (Bob Dylan) – 3:53 (B-side of "Towers of Strength" single, June 1988)
15. "When You Dance" (Neil Young) – 4:05 (B-side of "Out of My Hands" single, November 1988)
16. "Everybody Moves" (early version) (Myers, Peno) – 4:46
17. "As Must Have" (demo) (Myers, Peno) – 3:29
18. "Free Dirt" (demo) (Myers) – 4:03

== Personnel ==
- Brett Myers – guitar, harmonies, lead vocals ("Free Dirt," "Out of My Hands")
- Ron Peno – vocals
- Mark Lock – bass
- Chris Welch – drums, percussion
- Frank Brunetti – organ, piano

=== Additional personnel ===
- Don Walker – piano ("Free Dirt")
- Tim Fagan – saxophone ("Caesar's Gold")
- Astrid Munday – backing vocals ("Free Dirt")
