= The Psychotic Turnbuckles =

Australian garage punk band

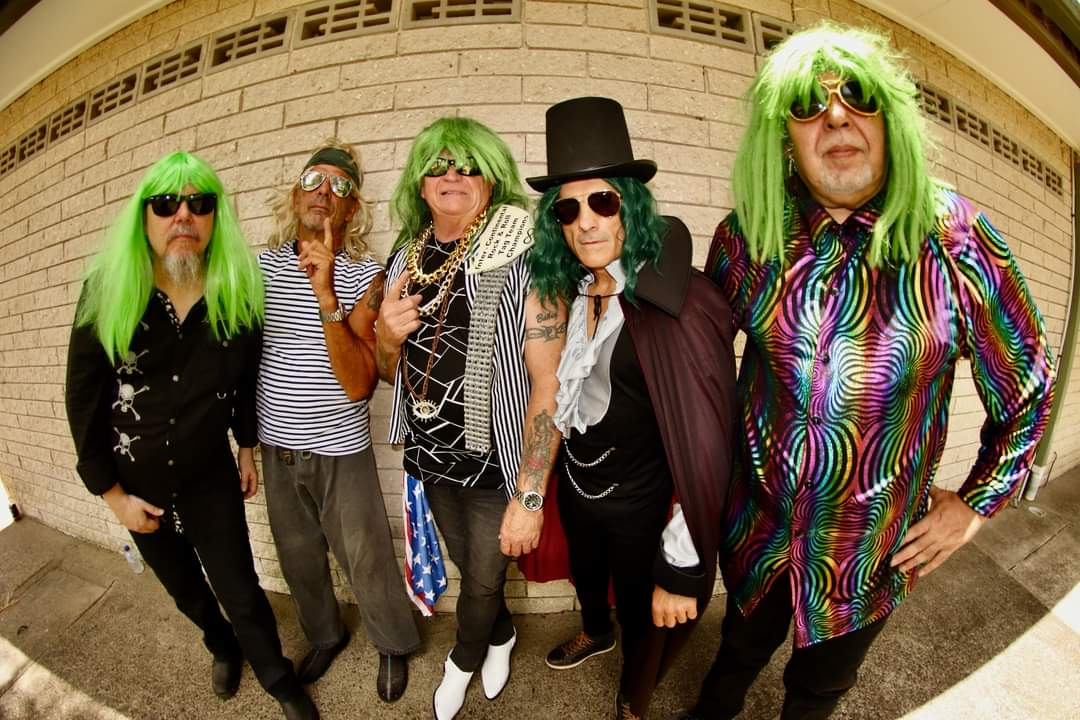
- The Psychotic Turnbuckles, February 2023

Background information
- Origin: Sydney, Australia
- Genre: Garage punk
- Years active: 1984–1994; 2012–present
- Labels: Vi-nil; Citadel; For the Record; Shagpile/Shock; Vi-nil; Rattlesnake
- Members: Jesse the Intruder (vocals); The Grand Wizard (guitar); Buddy "Bam Bam" Balam the Brooklyn Bruiser (drums); Count Forza (guitar); The Infliktor (bass)
- Past members: The Creep; The Spoiler; El Sicodelico; The Psychedelic Unknown; Bud "The Sledgehammer" Slater; Kid Sunshine; Mr Ultimate; Gorgeous Lord Karl Domah)
- Website: psychoticturnbuckles.com.au

The Psychotic Turnbuckles are an Australian garage punk band formed in 1984. The group's original members were Jesse the Intruder on lead vocals, The Creep on bass guitar and vocals, The Grand Wizard on guitar, The Spoiler on drums and El Sicodelico on guitar. Other long-term members were The Psychedelic Unknown/The Unknown on bass guitar and guitars and Gorgeous Lord Karl Domah on drums.

The group issued three studio albums, Beyond the Flip-out (October 1987), Pharaohs of the Far Out (1989) and Figure Four Brain Trance (October 1993), before disbanding in 1994. The Spoiler died in 2013. The Psychotic Turnbuckles reformed in 2012 and issued a compilation album in the following year, thereafter they have performed sporadically in the 2020s. They toured Japan in October 2023, playing four shows including an appearance at the Tokyo Halloween Ball. The band undertook an Australian tour "40 Years Undefeated" in 2024 to mark their fourth decade.

== History ==
The Psychotic Turnbuckles were formed in Sydney in 1984 as part of a wave of hard rock bands that sprang up in Australia in the first half of the 1980s with roots in the US 1960s punk and 1970s big-energy Detroit rock scenes. The band were professional wrestlers who re-located from Pismo Beach in California after being banned by the Pismo Beach Wrestling Alliance. Founding members were Jesse the Intruder on lead vocals, The Creep on bass guitar and vocals, The Grand Wizard on guitar, The Spoiler on drums and El Sicodelico on guitar. Their influences were the 13th Floor Elevators, Radio Birdman, the Moving Sidewalks, the Masters Apprentices, the Sonics and the Aztecs.

The Psychotic Turnbuckles released two singles on Vi-nil Records, "The Creeps" (May 1985) and "Psychotic Situation" (November),. while the latter had been co-written by The Intruder and The Grand Wizard for another band, band, Conspirators. Australian musicologist Ian McFarlane described these singles as "primitive slices of buzzing R&B/garagemania" with "authentic 1960s sound and sheer acid-guitar firepower". In 1986 they appeared on Network 10's TV talent show Star Search, performing "The Creeps".

Their debut extended play of six tracks, Destroy Dull City, followed in August 1986 via Rattlesnake Records, which was produced by Rob Younger (Died Pretty, Lime Spiders, the Stems). The Music's Michael Smith referred to the band's "mythical" origin story. According to Destroy Dull City's liner notes the members were former professional American wrestlers who re-located to Australia by 1982 from Pismo Beach, California, after banishment from Pismo Beach Wrestling Alliance by promoter Sammy Duke. Their publicity described "a nuclear accident during the band's daily surf which turned their hair psychedelic green and purple. They now drink Turnbuckle Tonic to keep it that way."

The Canberra Times' Lisa Wallace described their third EP, Go Go Gorilla (1987), as "throwbacks from a bad '60s acid trip [which] made me smile... Be different, be daring." In that year the group were in an episode of comedy TV series, Willing and Abel performing a non-released track, "Your Face is Driving Me Insane".

The Psychotic Turnbuckles' first studio album, Beyond the Flip-out (October 1987), was recorded in March with Clark (The Creep) leaving before it was released. He was replaced on bass guitar by The Psychedelic Unknown/The Unknown). Bud "The Sledgehammer" Slater replaced El Sicodelico on guitar later that year, who was replaced in turn by Kid Sunshine in 1988. Psychotic Turnbuckles were a regular attraction on the Sydney live music circuit and shared stages with the Troggs, the Hitmen, Dark Carnival, Beasts of Bourbon and the Screaming Tribesmen. They regularly worked as the house band at the Petersham Inn, Sydney, which ran The Pismo Bar, in their honour. Their single, "Good Times Outweigh the Bad Times" (1988), was reviewed by Wallace's colleague Kathryn Whitfield, "these boys have attempted to not only hide their identities, but also any inkling of talent... 60s-flavoured thrash rock that makes a lot of noise about nothing".

The line-up of The Intruder, The Unknown, The Grand Wizard and Mr Ultimate on drums recorded the band's second studio album, Pharaohs of the Far Out (1989) for Survival Records. The disc was produced by Johnny Kannis (ex-the Hitmen). Mr Ultimate was replaced on drums by Gorgeous Lord Karl Domah before the album appeared. The Intruder, Wizard, The Unknown and Domah line-up issued an EP, Lunar Chik (1989). Two members of touring US band Guns and Roses, Duff McKagan and Slash, attended a 1992 show by the band at the Lansdowne Hotel, Sydney.

Psychotic Turnbuckles released their next studio album, Figure Four Brain Trance (October 1993) via Shagpile/Shock. Late in 1994 The Unknown was replaced on bass guitar by Chuck the Rock and the group issued a compilation album, Ride the Wild Sounds (1994), before disbanding. The band existed for a decade and had signed to US label Sympathy for the Record Industry as well as several Australian imprints. The band eventually dissolved as members moved back to the US in the early 1990s. In June 1997 the line-up of The Intruder, The Grand Wizard, The Unknown (on guitar), Chuck the Rock (on bass guitar) and Karl Domah reformed for a one-off gig, where they provided a giveaway EP, Louder than Distortion (1997).

Supposedly inspired by a fan's social media page, the line-up of Jesse the Intruder, The Grand Wizard, The Unknown and Karl Domahreunited in Sydney in December 2012. Encouraged by their audience's reaction, they signed to Citadel and issued a retrospective 2× CD compilation album, Destroy Dull City (2013). The collection includes the EP of the same name, their first studio album, previously unreleased demos, out-takes and their singles.

The band played shows in Melbourne, Sydney and Brisbane. Former member The Spoiler died in 2013. The Psychotic Turnbuckles have performed sporadically since then and toured Japan in 2023, including an appearance at the Tokyo Halloween Ball. The band is undertaking an Australian tour "40 Years Undefeated" in 2024 to mark their fourth decade.

== Members ==
- Jesse the Intruder — lead vocals (1984–1994, 2012–present)
- The Creep — bass guitar, backing vocals (1984–1987)
- The Grand Wizard — guitars (1984–1994, 2012–present)
- The Spoiler — drums (1984–1989, died 2012)
- El Sicodelico — guitars (1984–1987, 2012–2015)
- The Psychedelic Unknown/The Unknown — bass guitar, guitars (1987–1993, 2012–2022)
- Bud "The Sledgehammer" Slater — guitars (1987–1988)
- Kid Sunshine — guitars (1988–1989)
- Mr Ultimate — drums (1989)
- Gorgeous Lord Karl Domah — drums (1989–1994, 2012–2023)
- Chuck the Rock — bass guitar (1994)
- Solomon Grande — guitar (2016)
- Buddy "Bam Bam" Balam the Brooklyn Bruiser — drums (2016, 2023–present)
- Count Forza — guitars (2020–present)
- The Infliktor — bass guitar (2022–present)

== Discography ==
=== Studio albums ===
- Beyond the Flip-out (October 1987) - Rattlesnake (RAT 1207)
- Pharaohs of the Far Out (1989) - Rattlesnake/Survival (RAT 501)
- Figure Four Brain Trance (October 1993) - Shagpile/Shock (SHAG CD 0008)

=== Compilation albums ===
- Ride the Wild Sounds (1994) - Shock (MOTOR04)
- Destroy Dull City (2×CD, 2013) - Citadel (CITCD570)

=== Extended plays ===
- Destroy Dull City (August 1986) - Rattlesnake (RAT 1201)
- Psychotic Turnbuckles (1987) - Rattlesnake RAT 1203
- Go Go Gorilla (August 1987) - Rattlesnake (RAT 1206)
- Lunar Chik (1989) - Rattlesnake (RAT 1213)
- Louder than Distortion (1991) - self-released (ML10452)
- She's Afraid to Love Me (1992) - Shagpile/Shock (SHAG 7006)
- You Hurt My Head (November 2013) - self-released

=== Singles ===
- "The Creeps" (1984) - Vi-nil
- "Psychotic Situation" (1985) - Vi-nil
- "Good Times Outweigh the Bad Times" (1988) - Rattlesnake
- "Rock and Roll Terrorists" (1991) - Shock
- "The American Ruse" - (1991)
- "Crazy Times Ahead" (1993) - Sympathy for the Record Industry
