= The Moffs =

1980s Australian psychedelic rock band

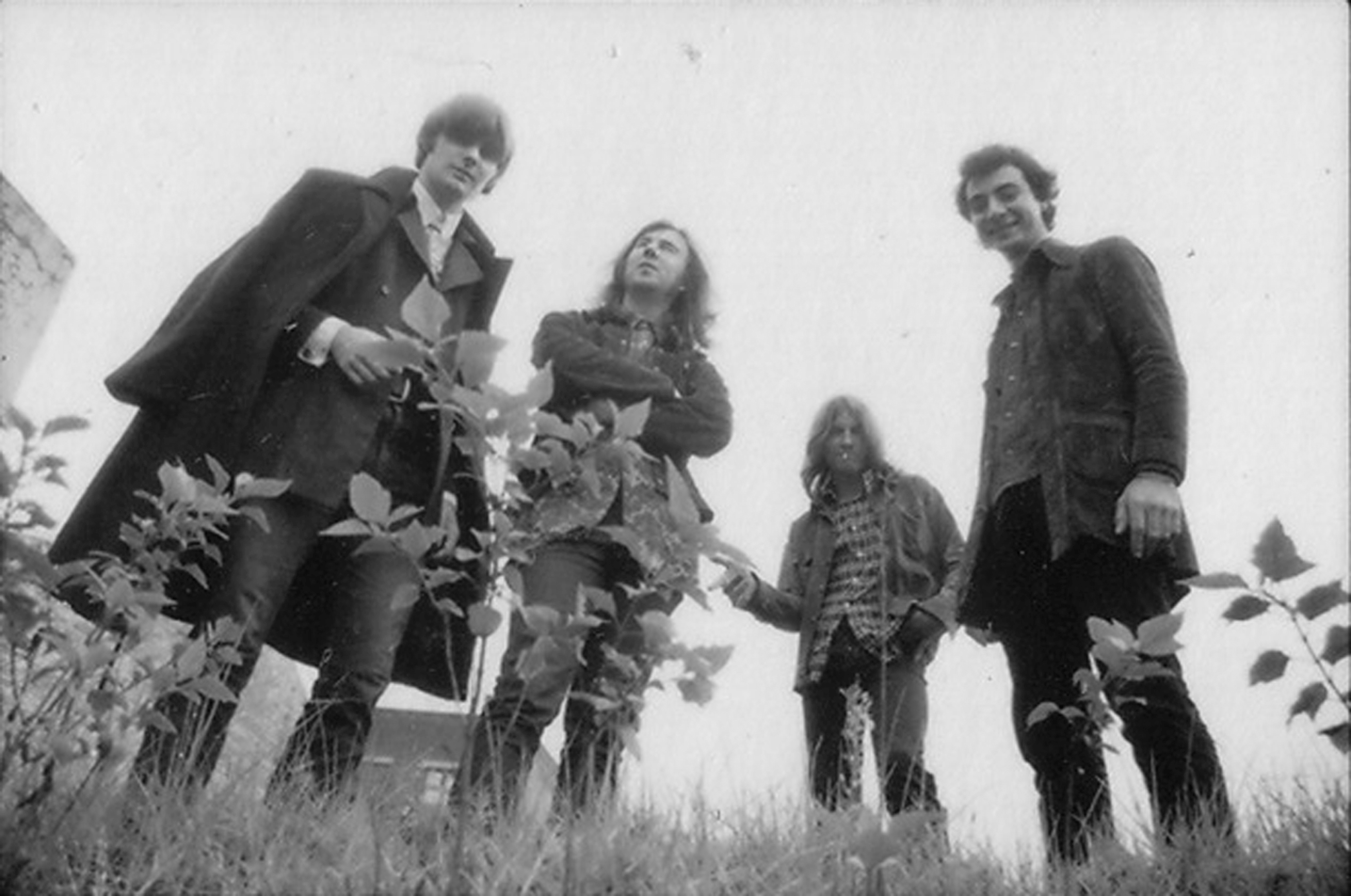
- The Moffs 1985 original line up

Background information
- Origin: Sydney, Australia
- Genres: Neo-psychedelia, progressive rock
- Years active: 1984–1989 (Note: One-off reunions: 1994, 2008, 2011)
- Label: Citadel Records
- Past members: Tom Kazas; David Byrnes; Nick Potts; Alan Hislop; Andrew Byrnes; Scott Barnes; Mick Duncan; Damon Giles; Brandon Saul
- Website: themoffs.bandcamp.com

The Moffs were an Australian psychedelic rock band formed in Sydney in 1984. Their 1985 song "Another Day in the Sun" attracted local and international underground attention. Led by Tom Kazas, they incorporated many styles during their five-year career: psychedelic rock, progressive rock, blues rock, early post rock, 1960s and 1980s pop, free improvisation, impressionistic lyrics, Greek folk music styles, experimental composition and repetitive minimalist structures. The band's name was invented by misspelling the word 'moths'.

== The early years 1980–1983 ==
The band was formed by high school friends Tom Kazas and David 'Smiley' Byrnes, who lived in the beachside suburb of Maroubra, Sydney, Australia. Absorbing early influence from Led Zeppelin and Pink Floyd, the pair soon enough embraced the punk-new wave zeitgeist of the late 1970s and early 1980s, with bands like the Jam and the Cure. In 1980, Tom had formed a high school band called Antiscan, that played covers from these bands and some of his early original songs. During 1982–3, Tom and David were part of the 1960s inspired Mod scene of the inner-city of Sydney, that embraced the sound of the 1960s British Blues Invasion with bands like the Yardbirds. The pair also took to Jimi Hendrix, the Beatles, and early Pink Floyd.

It was in the mod scene that Tom and David met harmonica-playing Nick Potts, whose large record collection included rare 1960s psychedelic music that became influential in shaping the future sound of the band. Together with Nick and drummer Andrew Watson, the group played the formative gig in 1984 at The Freakout in the share-house in Darlinghurst Sydney, where future Moffs art director Ben Evison lived. This psychedelic-happening house-party gig was where the band met Alan Hislop, of the garage-psyche band The Suicidal Flowers, who was soon invited to join the band.

== Formation and success 1984–1986 ==
Greg 'Quick' Smyrell, former road manager of the Scientists, saw the band at a 1984 gig and took on the role of manager. Quick enlisted the Scientist's record producer Chris Logan to oversee the band's first recording, that became their 'demo tape'. This cassette tape was successful in not only securing more inner-city gigs for the band, but became sought after by the now increasing audience. In late 1984, Quick handed the demo tape to John Needham of Citadel Records (bands on the label included Died Pretty, Lime Spiders, Screaming Tribesmen, the Stems), who signed the band to the label.

Another Day in the Sun, with its flip side Clarodomineaux, was recorded in February 1985 at Paradise Studios Sydney and released in April. The single became a major independent success. It reached no.1 on the Australian Independent Charts and stayed in the top 20 for over four months. Australian music magazine Rock Australia Magazine (RAM) at the time wrote, "The Moffs have strung together every solemn rock'n'roll cliché and somehow succeeded in creating the most perfect yearning melancholy spine-tingler since White Rabbit." The song was also embraced by the underground music scenes in the UK and Europe, with Jon Storey of influential UK fanzine Bucketfull of Brains calling it single of the year; "this is the best of the flawless series of Citadel singles, and believe me, the competition is fierce". Tom recalls that the writing of the song Another Day in the Sun was influenced more by early Brian Eno than by 1960s psychedelia. The band began what was to become their consistent touring of Sydney and Melbourne where audiences continued to grow, and where the vibrant community radio scene of Melbourne (3RRR, 3CR, 3PBS) embraced and supported the band.

Having moved away from the early bluesy sound, the band started to experiment with longer developmental forms and wide dynamics. The live shows took on a reputation for intensity and atmosphere. Due to emerging stylistic differences, Nick departed the band. He was replaced on organ by Mick Duncan, who was the guitarist for local band No Mans Land. A highlight for the band at the end of 1985 was playing the support spot for John Cale (Velvet Underground) in Sydney and Brisbane. In December 1985 the band entered the studio again with producer Chris Logan to record the Mini-Album. This album had some of the band's best known songs of Tom's, e.g. Look to Find and I Once Knew, but also a lengthy improvisation taking on a more progressive feel, with King Crimson becoming a big influence. This inspired Tom to buy one of the few Mellotrons that existed in Australia. The self-titled Mini Album reached no. 1 on the independent charts, despite the mixed reviews. By the end of 1985 both Alan Hislop and Mick Duncan had left the band.

The Moffs received new energy when Smiley's younger brother, Andrew Byrnes, who had quickly become quite accomplished on the drums, joined the band in 1986. The new dynamism in the rhythm section of the two brothers, both pushing the expressiveness of their instruments, was to become a feature of all future live performances. Organist Damon Giles, from Sydney band Stupidity, completed the quartet who recorded the next single Flowers/By The Breeze. This single also reached no.1 on the independent charts. The band continued to gig in Sydney and Melbourne, while also touring Adelaide, Brisbane and some regional New South Wales venues. In mid 1986, Damon left the band and was replaced by Brandon Saul, who would later become a promoter of the Falls Music Festival. Brandon departed at the end of 1986 and the band was close to calling it a day.

== Final phase 1987–1989 ==
A critical boost was received when Scott Barnes joined the band in early 1987. The band recorded The Traveller/Quakers Drum, with a new producer and revitalised outlook. The single reached no.1 on the Australian Independent Charts. The band continued to play in Sydney and Melbourne, and performed what was regarded as a legendary gig of dynamics and atmospherics, in the Great Hall at Montsalvat, Melbourne.

The band enlisted producer Tony Espie at Studios 301 to record their official debut full-length debut album Labyrinth. Released in June 1988, Labyrinth was emblematic of the Moffs sound that incorporated episodic songs and arrangements, dynamic rock performances and minimalist repetitive motifs. Many praised the album, with RAM saying; "Along with the Church and Not Drowning Waving, the Moffs have proved with Labyrinth to be the most sophisticated atmosphere conjurors in the country. And if this isn't enough recommendation, all four players are so proficient that live, their complex arrangements and full scope of dynamics fuse with liberal sprinklings of improvisation to create what can only be described as magic." The album reached no.3 in the Australian independent charts. Normal Records in Germany gave the album a European release and international attention on the band was again high. However, in spite of the renewed attention and success, a lack of funds and management meant the Moffs were unable to travel to Europe and the UK to promote themselves.

The band continued to headline shows in 1989, while also supporting leading Australian bands such as the Triffids, Died Pretty and Not Drowning Waving. However, the strains of being a staunchly independent band, temperamentally and stylistically non-mainstream, again began to take their toll on the group. Tom had released a solo album of ambient music in 1989, and further aesthetic and personal differences were atomizing the band. The Moffs performed two final shows, one at the Paddington RSL in Sydney and a sellout at the Old Greek Theatre in Melbourne. By the end of 1989 the band had ceased.

== Reformations and beyond ==
The compilation album Psychadelicatessen was released in 1994 and the band reformed for shows in Sydney and Melbourne. In 2004, Another Day in the Sun was included in Tales of the Australian Underground, Singles 1976–1989, Vol. 1 , a compilation by Tim Pittman of record label Feel Presents. This album included the cream of the internationally regarded independent Australian rock music scene. In 2008 Tim produced and released the comprehensive double CD, the Moffs the Collection, that contained all the recorded material of the Moffs, and a multi-page booklet with a detailed history of the band with rare photos. To support this release, the last line-up of the Moffs reunited again and performed shows in Sydney and Melbourne. Another Day in the Sun was included in the 2010 Australian TV series, Spirited. In 2011 the original line-up reunited and performed music of the band's early years for gigs in Sydney and Melbourne. In 2015 Jagwar Ma released a dub inspired cover of Another Day in the Sun. In 2016 the Moffs were mentioned in the book Australian Rock and Pop music 1960–85 by David Nicholls. In 2018, Tom Kazas produced the compilation albums The Young Person's Guide and Trails to bring the band's music to the digital platforms.

== Members ==
=== Original lineup ===
- Tom Kazas - guitars, lead vocals, mellotron, piano, extras (1984–1989)
- David Byrnes – bass guitar, backing vocals, extras (1984–1989)
- Nick Potts – organ, harmonica (1984–1985)
- Alan Hislop – drums (1984–1986)

=== in 1986 ===
- Mick Duncan – organ, piano
- Damon Giles – organ
- Brandon Saul – organ

=== Last lineup ===
- Andrew Byrnes – drums, percussion (1986–1989)
- Scott Barnes – keyboards, piano (1987–1989)
- David Byrnes – bass guitar, backing vocals, extras (1984–1989)
- Tom Kazas – guitars, lead vocals, extras (1984–1989)

== Discography ==
=== Singles/albums ===
- 11 to 5 – demo cassette (1984)
- Another Day in the Sun b/w Clarodomineaux – 7" vinyl single (1985)
- The Moffs – self titled mini album – 12" vinyl album (1985)
- Flowers b/w by the Breeze – 7" vinyl single (1986)
- Traveller b/w Quakers Drum – 7" vinyl single (1987)
- Labyrinth – 12" vinyl and CD album (1989)

=== Compilations ===
- Entomology – album 12" vinyl (1987 and 2021)
- Psychadelicatessen – album CD (1994)
- The Moffs The Collection – double CD album and booklet (2008)
- A Young Person's Guide – digital album – bandcamp (2018)
- Trails – digital album – bandcamp (2018)

=== Recorded covers ===
- Tomorrow Never Knows by The Beatles – on the demo cassette: 11 to 5 (1984)
- Eight Miles High by The Byrds – Tribute album: Time in Between, Imaginary Records (1989)
- What Do You Do by Bonzo Dog Doo-Dah Band – recorded for Imaginary Records 1987 (released 2008 on the Moffs the Collection)

== Notable gigs ==
=== Sydney ===
- The Freak Out, Darlinghurst
- Players, Paddington
- Strawberry Hills Hotel, Surry Hills
- Trade Union Club, Surry Hills
- Harold Park Hotel, Glebe
- The Channon Hall, Lismore (regional NSW)

=== Melbourne ===
- The Prince of Wales, St. Kilda
- The Tote, Collingwood
- The Punters Club, Fitzroy
- Montsalvat, Eltham
- The Old Greek Theatre, Richmond
