= Roger Grierson =

New Zealand musician (born 1957)

Roger Grierson (born June 1957) is a New Zealand born musician and music industry executive.

== Career ==
In 1975 Grierson headed to London and Egypt to live but found himself lured back to Sydney in 1976 to work at White Light Records. Soon afterwards he formed the punk band The Thought Criminals.

In 1978, Grierson started Doublethink Records to record local Australian bands including Singles, Rejex, and Suicide Squad. In 1980 he started GREEN Records with Stuart Coupe and Warren Fahey, and together they released records by Tactics, Allniters, Lime Spiders, Spy V Spy, Do-Re-Mi, Dropbears, Beasts of Bourbon, New Christs and The Johnnys, Grierson producing the first Beasts of Bourbon record The Axemans Jazz.

Grierson managed The Allniters, Tactics and Spy v Spy in 1981. During this period he was the distribution manager for Larrikin Records; in 1983 he took on The Johnnys, and in 1985 The Wreckery: a "junk rock" group formed by ex members of Nick Cave's backing band The Bad Seeds. In 1985, he teamed up with Rick Tanaka, radio presenter / producer of Tokyo Hit Beat and the award-winning Nippi Rock Shop on JJJ, and they started 135 Music (135 being the line that joins Aust and Japan on the map) to encourage cross cultural promotion. This partnership has lasted over 30 years, and they now run escorted tours of oddball Japan, as LobrowJapan.com

In 1987 Grierson started promoting Australian tours for acts signed to the New Zealand label, Flying Nun Records. These acts include The Bats, The Chills, Straitjacket Fits and JPS Experience. In 1988 he started managing The Go Betweens and Nick Cave and the Bad Seeds. In 1989 he toured Tackhead, Public Image Ltd, Pop Will Eat Itself and began managing bands such as The Hummingbirds and Tall Tales and True. At this time he also formed Lost in Music publishing and signed Tex Perkins, Rebecca's Empire, Caligula, Dave Graney, Clouds, Falling Joys, Crystal Set and Kim Salmon to name but a few.

In 1990 he promoted tours by Pop Will Eat Itself, Buzzcocks, Jesus Jones, the Fall, Norman Cook/ Beats International. 1991 saw more touring with PWEI, Jesus Jones, Ned's Atomic Dustbin, The Godfathers, Dread Zeppelin, and Mojo Nixon. In 1983 Grierson was involved in the Dead Kennedys tour in 1986, with The Gun Club and in 1989 with Sonic Youth and Dinosaur Jr. In the 1990s, he also started and organised The Big Backyard Concert.

In 1992 Grierson moved the Lost in Music catalogue to Polygram Music Publishing and became managing director of the now defunct Polygram Music Australia, a position he retained until 1997. During his time at the helm of Polygram Music, he signed Pauly Fuemana, The Cruel Sea, David Hirschfelder, the LennOno catalogue, Leonard Cohen, Died Pretty, Nick Cave, Powderfinger, The Fauves and The Go Betweens.

In 1998 Grierson replaced the long-serving Alan Hely as Chairman of Festival Records and Festival Music publishing, working closely with James Murdoch. Under Griersons' stewardship, Festival Records acquired Michael Gudinski's 51% share of Mushroom Records to become Festival Mushroom Records in 1999.

In 2001, Grierson was promoted to Senior Vice President for Newscorp Music, continuing his existing roles but now also supervising Mushroom UK and Rawkus and he oversaw the Festival 50th anniversary in 2002.

In 2005 Grierson left Festival and retired from the music business. A year later, FMR sold to the Warner Music group, and its lucrative publishing assets were subsequently acquired by Michael Gudinski

In 2006 he proceeded to reform The Thought Criminals, released an EP "Peace Love and Under surveillance" and in 2007 formed the UnTh!nkables with Phillip Judd from Split Enz, releasing an album "UNTitled"

In 2010 he became a director of Moshcam.com, the world's leading online streaming live music concert platform.

In 2015, he commenced lecturing on music publishing and music industry related issues at the Australian Institute of Music, while commencing his escorted tours of Oddball Japan, Lobrow Japan, with Rick Tanaka.
