= Pre-Deity =

Compilation album by Died Pretty
- Released: 1987
- Recorded: January 1984–May 1985
- Studio: Honeyfarm Studios, Trafalgar Studios, Sydney
- Genre: Rock
- Label: Citadel Records
- Producer: Rob Younger

Died Pretty chronology
Free Dirt (1986)	Pre-Deity (1987)	Lost (1988)

Professional ratings
Review scores
Source	Rating
Allmusic	4/5 stars

Pre Deity is a compilation album by Australian rock band Died Pretty. It was released in 1987 in the wake of their debut album Free Dirt and comprised tracks from the band's early singles and their 1985 "Next to Nothing" EP. The album was re-released on CD in 1992 and all the tracks were included on the bonus disc of the 2008 Aztec Music remastered reissue of Free Dirt.

== Track listing ==
(All songs by Brett Myers, Ron Peno)

1. "Out of the Unknown" – 4:06 (single originally released April 1984)
2. "World Without"– 3:41 (B-side of "Out of the Unknown")
3. "Mirror Blues" – 10:03 (A and B sides of single originally released October 1984)
4. "Ambergris" – 4:20 (From "Next to Nothing" EP, July 1985)
5. "Plaining Days" – 4:11 (From "Next to Nothing" EP, July 1985)
6. "Desperate Hours" – 8:03 (From "Next to Nothing" EP, July 1985)
7. "Final Twist" – 4:16 (From "Next to Nothing" EP, July 1985)

== Personnel ==
- Brett Myers – guitar
- Ron Peno – vocals
- Jonathan Lickliter – bass (tracks 1, 2)
- Mark Lock – bass (tracks 3 to 7)
- Colin Barwick – drums (tracks 1 to 3)
- Chris Welsh – drums (tracks 4 to 7)
- Frank Brunetti – keyboards

=== Additional personnel ===
- Joe Porkowski – cello ("Plaining Days")
