= D.C. (Died Pretty song) =

Single by Died Pretty

from the album Doughboy Hollow
- Recorded: September 1991
- Studio: Trafalgar Studios, Annandale, Sydney
- Label: Blue Mosque
- Songwriters: Ronald Peno, Steve Clark
- Producer: Hugh Jones

"D.C." is a song by Australian alternative rock band Died Pretty. It was released in September 1991 as the second single from their fourth studio album Doughboy Hollow. The song peaked at number 124 on the ARIA Charts. It was nominated for Best Video at the 1992 Aria Awards.

== Lyrical content ==
Talking to Richard Kingsmill of Triple J in 1996, Peno explained, "The lyric is about the passing of someone, and coming to terms with it. Lyrically I wrote it about a dear friend that passed away while we were on tour in Europe. His name was David Cox—hence the "D.C." title. He was this wonderful person who came into my life, influenced me and left it again before his time." Peno agreed with Kingsmill's assessment that the song was "a bit of an anthem", stating that he "love[s] the song" because "it's straight from the heart".

== Reception ==
Double J named it in the top fifty Australian songs of the 1990s, saying, "Like so many of their songs, "D.C." is passionate, euphoric and transcendent. Ron Peno sings his heart out against a backdrop of rich instrumentation in exquisite balance. Klein Blue perfection in a song."

Rolling Stone Australia said, "featuring Go-Betweens violinist Amanda Brown, the poppy single "DC" finds the bright side of saying goodbye just as Hoey's churchy organ enters the frame." Caz Tran at Double J agreed, "his voice is laced with stirring emotion. It feels as though he’s singing it to the sky from a mountaintop, at once jubilant as much it is deeply mournful. Brown's violin and Sarah Peet's cello combine with Brett Myers' chiming guitar licks, as the song ends with a gorgeous emotional release."

In The Sydney Morning Herald, Mark Seymour said, "It is full of yearning and melancholy - the lyric is still fresh, like all great love songs. "D.C." captures the essence of events as though they have occurred only minutes before. We feel as though the song has simply erupted, the singer seemingly overwhelmed with feeling."

== Track listing ==
1. "D.C." - 4:33
2. "Wonder" - 3:44
3. "Everybody Moves" - 4:50
