= Every Brilliant Eye =

Studio album by Died Pretty
- Released: March 1990
- Studio: American Recording, NRG Recording Studios, Los Angeles
- Genre: Rock
- Length: 45:30
- Label: Blue Mosque/Festival Records
- Producer: Jeff Eyrich

Died Pretty chronology
Lost (1988)	Every Brilliant Eye (1990)	Doughboy Hollow (1991)

Singles from Every Brilliant Eye
- 1. "Whitlam Square" Released: February 1990; 2. "True Fools Fall" Released: May 1990

Professional ratings
Review scores
Source	Rating
Allmusic	4/5 stars

Every Brilliant Eye is the third album by Australian rock band Died Pretty. It was released in 1990 and produced by Jeff Eyrich, whose previous production credits included the Gun Club, the Plimsouls and T Bone Burnett.

The album was recorded in Los Angeles at the close of a tour of Europe and the United States. It was the first to feature new keyboardist John Hoey (ex-X-Men, the Thought Criminals and New Christs) following the departure of long-time member Frank Brunetti and bassist Steve Clark (ex-Glass), who replaced Mark Lock.

== Track listing ==
(All songs by Brett Myers, Ron Peno except where noted)

1. "Sight Unseen" – 4:39
2. "The Underbelly"– 6:24
3. "Herr Godiva" – 4:19
4. "Face Toward the Sun" – 5:59
5. "Prayer" – 4:22
6. "True Fools Fall" – 4:15
7. "Whitlam Square" – 4:27
8. "Rue the Day" (Ron Peno, Steve Clark) – 3:53
9. "From the Dark" – 7:12

== Personnel ==
- Brett Myers – guitar
- Ron Peno – vocals
- Steve Clark – bass
- John Hoey – keyboards
- Chris Welsh – drums, percussion

=== Additional personnel ===
- J'Anna Jacoby – violin
- Shandra Beri – backing vocals
- Gary McLaughlin – percussion
- Gonzalo Quintana III – drums

== Charts ==
Chart (1990)	Peak position
Australian Albums (ARIA)	79
