= Stuart Coupe =

Australian music journalist and band manager

Stuart Coupe is an Australian music journalist, author, band manager, promoter, publicist and music label founder. A renowned rock music writer, Coupe is best known for his work with Roadrunner, Rock Australia Magazine, The Sun-Herald, and Dolly; the music labels, GREEN Records and Laughing Outlaw; and the author of books including The Promoters, Gudinski, Roadies, and Paul Kelly.

Coupe is a former manager of the Australian bands Hoodoo Gurus and Paul Kelly and is currently a presenter on Sydney radio stations 2SER and FBI Radio. He is also known for his writing as a reviewer of crime fiction for the Sydney Morning Herald and for founding the Australian crime fiction magazine, Mean Streets.

== Early life and education ==
Stuart Coupe was born in Launceston, Tasmania on the 11th of September 1956.

He attended Scotch Oakburn College Launceston and Launceston College, Tasmania. During his school years, he developed a passion for music and writing, and had an interest in film, screening films supplied by the Sydney Filmmakers Co-operative to Launceston audiences.

On completing high school, he studied to be an English speech and drama teacher in Launceston in 1975, and then moved to Adelaide, South Australia, and enrolled in an arts degree at Flinders University at the beginning of 1976. He did not complete the degree, dropping out of uni to move to Sydney for a writing job in 1978.

== Career ==
=== Writing ===
Coupe started music writing in high school, publishing one issue of a school newspaper, Labyrinth, at the age of 15. In 1977 he was one of the editors of Empire Times, Flinders University's student newspaper. In 1977 he started a punk rock fanzine, Street Fever, with Donald Robertson, which folded after one issue. In early 1978 he co-founded the Adelaide what's-on guide, Preview, with Dennis Atkins, Kim Krummel, Terry Plane, and Phillip White.

In 1978, together with Donald Robertson and others, he co-founded the Adelaide-based music magazine, Roadrunner. After co-editing and writing for the first five issues of Roadrunner, Coupe moved to Sydney to join RAM (Rock Australia Magazine), where he worked as a staff writer for 18 months.

In 1980 he was Sydney editor of TAGG (The Alternative Gig Guide), and a year later started writing the Rockbeat column for The Sun-Herald, which continued through to 1991. During the eighties and nineties, Coupe was also a freelance music writer for The Age, The Canberra Times, Rolling Stone Australia, Vox (Melbourne), Nation Review, Australian Playboy, Sydney Shout, On the Street, and Drum Media (now known as The Music. He was also the first editor of Triple J radio network's JMag.

Coupe continues to contribute to Rhythms magazine.

Coupe is frequently asked to participate as speaker and panellist at music industry events and conferences, such as Mumbrella Entertainment Marketing Summit 2016 and Australian Music Week 2019.

=== Music labels ===
In 1980 Coupe, Roger Grierson (ex-The Thought Criminals), and Warren Fahey founded the independent GREEN Records, which released artists including: The Allniters, Beasts of Bourbon, Do Re Mi, Drop Bears, Lime Spiders, New Christs, North 2 Alaskans, Spy vs Spy (Australian band), Super K, Tactics (band) and The Johnnys.

In 1996 he was involved with setting up early Internet start-up, Velvet, an online music and music news subscription service that folded in the first year.

In 1999 Coupe and Jules Normington (a co-founder of Phantom Records) set up the Laughing Outlaw music label focussing on new and emerging Australian artists and a selection on overseas acts. After 16 years he left Laughing Outlaw in 2015 by which time it had released over 150 CDs from artists including writer Andrew McMillan, Anne McCue, Black Cab, Dusty Ravens, Emma Swift, Jason Walker, John Kennedy, L.J. Hill, Mic Conway, New Christs, Perry Keyes, the Widowbirds and Clinton Walker's Inner City Sound compilation. In 2005 Coupe also opened and ran the Laughing Outlaw record shop in the inner-city Sydney suburb of Lewisham, which closed in 2014.

=== Band management ===
In 1983 and 1984 Coupe was the first manager of Hoodoo Gurus and toured the United States with the band after the release of their first album, Stoneage Romeos. From 1984 to 1990 he was the manager of Paul Kelly (Australian musician) during the time Kelly released the albums Post, Gossip, Under The Sun and So Much Water So Close To Home. During these years Coupe also did stints as the manager of X (Australian band), the Flaming Hands, Drop Bears, The Amazing Woolloomooloosers and the Danglin' Bros. He later managed Ian Rilen, Dan Brodie and Perry Keyes.

=== Publicity and tour promotion ===
Coupe's involvement in the Australian music industry has included providing publicity and tour promotion for Australian and international bands from the early 1980s to the present day. He worked on publicity for the tours by The Clash, The Cramps, Gary Glitter, The Dead Kennedys, The Gun Club, The Teardrop Explodes, and Jonathan Richman.

In the late eighties he formed the band touring company, BBC, with Bicci Henderson and Rob Barnham, and later dropped the name after objections from the British broadcaster, the BBC. Under the auspices of BBC and later with promoter Keith Glass, Coupe was the promoter of Australian tours for Lucinda Williams, Rosanne Cash, Mary-Chapin Carpenter, Tom Russell, Dave Alvin, Ted Hawkins, Guy Clark, Chris Whitley, Harry Dean Stanton, Dick Dale, and Link Wray.

Coupe was also involved in promotion and publicity for international crime fiction writers. He and Keith Glass brought Elmore Leonard to Australia in 1993 and James Elroy in 1995. He went on to arrange Australian appearances for Kinky Friedman, Andrew Vachss, Ed McBain and P. J. O'Rourke. In the 1990s Coupe also appeared at writers festivals interviewing Walter Mosley, Michael Connelly, Lawrence Block and Ken Bruen.

In 2016 he resumed providing publicity services for a range of international and Australian acts including P.P. Arnold, Alejandro Escovedo and Steve Poltz, the Out On The Weekend music festival and numerous Australian artists.

=== Books ===
Coupe has authored, co-authored, and edited a number of books since the early eighties. His first books were music encyclopedias, The New Music (1980) and The New Rock'n'Roll (1983) co-authored with Australian rock writer and historian, Glenn A Baker. He later published The Edge Ultimate CD Guide (1989) and an authorised biography, Craig McLachlan, the official book (1990).

In the early nineties, Coupe and Julie Ogden edited three anthologies of crime fiction: Hardboiled: Tough, Explicit and Uncompromising Crime Fiction (1992); and Case Reopened (1993), where crime writers were commissioned to write fictional solutions to real unsolved Australian murders and mysteries; and with Robert Hood Crosstown Traffic (1993), crime fiction that switched genres during the story.

Coupe co-authored Triple J's Internet Music Guide,(1998) with Richard Kingsmill. Coupe's more recent books include The Promoters (2003), Gudinski (2015); Roadies (2018); and Tex (2017), co-authored with Tex Perkins. In 2020, he published a biography of Australian musician, Paul Kelly (Australian musician). Also in 2020 came Coupe's book length collection of interviews with James Burton, Ron Tutt, Glen D. Hardin and Jerry Sceff who were Elvis Presley's TCB Band. The book is entitled On Stage With Elvis Presley (SEG Publishing). Coupe's interview with Beat Generation poet Allen Ginsberg was included in Conversations With Allen Ginsberg, edited by David Stephen Calonne (University Press Of Mississippi).

=== Broadcasting ===
Coupe's first foray into broadcasting was presenting the music program, Funk To Punk, on Sydney community radio station, 2SER in 1981. He was co-presenter with Bruce Stalder of the Sunday night Album Show on Sydney commercial radio station Triple M in 1987.

In 2003 Coupe began presenting a music program called Lyricism on FBi Radio in Sydney. He went on to present other programs, including Out Of The Box and Tune Up. He is one of the station's longest serving broadcasters and is currently the presenter of Wild Card at midday on Tuesdays. In 2013 he filled in as a presenter of the roots and world music program, The Planet, on ABC Radio National while its regular presenter, Lucky Oceans, was on leave.

Since 2013, Coupe has presented the weekly roots-based music program, Dirt Music, on 2SER, the first hour of which is syndicated nationally by the CBAA on community radio stations across Australia. In 2015 Dirt Music was awarded best 2SER music program.

== Bibliography ==
Works by Stuart Coupe
Title	Year	Notes	Ref Code
The New Music	1980	By Stuart Coupe & Glenn A. Baker (Published by Bay Books)	978-0-85835-493-7
The New Rock'n'Roll	1983	By Stuart Coupe & Glenn A. Baker (Published by Omnibus Press)	978-0-949789-02-0
Rock, The Year That Was '85	1985	By Stuart Coupe & Glenn A. Baker (Published by Bay Books)	Bib ID: 306877
1986, The Rock'n'Roll Year	1986	By Stuart Coupe & Dolly (Published by Fairfax Magazines)	Bib ID: 2432013
The Edge Ultimate CD Guide	1989	By Stuart Coupe (Century Magazines) (Published in a magazine format)	Bib ID: 706334
Craig McLachlan, the official book	1990	By Stuart Coupe (Published by Century Magazines)	978-0-646-04497-2
Hardboiled: Tough, Explicit and Uncompromising Crime Fiction (anthology)	1993	Edited by Stuart Coupe & Julie Ogden (Published by Allen and Unwin)	978-1-86373-221-5
Crosstown Traffic (anthology)	1993	Crime fiction by 12 Australian authors, edited by Stuart Coupe, Julie Ogden & Robert Hood (Published by (Five Islands Press)	978-1-875604-15-9
Case Reopened	1994	Edited by Stuart Coupe & Julie Ogden (Published by Allen and Unwin)	978-1-86373-531-5
Triple J's Internet Music Guide	1998	By Richard Kingsmill & Stuart Coupe (Published by ABC Books)	978-0-7333-0664-8
The Promoters: Inside stories from the Australian rock industry	2003	By Stuart Coupe (Published by Hodder Headline)	978-0-7336-1503-0
Gudinski: The Godfather of Australian Rock	2015	Biography on Michael Gudinski by Stuart Coupe (Published by Hachette Australia)	978-0-7336-3310-2
Tex	2017	By Tex Perkins & Stuart Coupe (Published by (Pan Macmillan Australia)	978-1-925481-35-8
Roadies: The Secret History of Australian Rock'n'roll	2020	By Stuart Coupe (Published by Hachette Australia)	978-0-7336-3874-9
On Stage With Elvis Presley: The Backstage Stories Of Elvis's Legendary TCB Band	2020	By Stuart Coupe (Published by SEG Publishing)	978-0-578-77746-7
Paul Kelly: The Man, The Music And The Life In Between	2021	By Stuart Coupe (Published by Hachette Australia)	978-0-7336-4234-0
Shake Some Action: My Life In Music (and Other Stuff)	2023	Autobiography by Stuart Coupe (Published by Penguin Books)	978-1-76104-636-0
Winners Never Quit! My Story	2025	Biography by Peter Noble with Stuart Coupe (Published by AIM Entertainment)	978-1-7635701-3-9
Saffron Incorporated: The First King of the Cross and Fifty Years of Sex, Murder, Music and Mayhem	2025	Book on Abe Saffron by Stuart Coupe (Published by Hachette Australia)	978-0-7336-4823-6

Book Chapters

Stuart Coupe has contributed chapters to the following anthologies:

- How to Write Crime Fiction, edited by Marele Day (Allen and Unwin, 1996) ISBN 978-1-86373-998-6
- Dear Santa, edited by Samuel Johnson (Hachette Australia, 2018) ISBN 978-0-7336-4186-2
- Allen Ginsberg: The Last Australian Interview, edited by David Stephen Calonne (University of Mississippi Press, 2019) ISBN 978-1-4968-2352-6
- Dear Dad, edited by Samuel Johnson (Hachette Australia, 2019) ISBN 978-0-7336-4314-9
- Dear Lover, edited by Samuel Johnson (Hachette Australia, 2023) ISBN 978-0-7336-4980-6

== Awards ==
- Ned Kelly Awards for Crime Fiction, Lifetime Achievement Award, Crime Writers Association of Australia (2005)
- Shortlisted, Biography book of the year, Australian Book Industry Awards for Paul Kelly (2021)
