= Another Day in the Sun =

1985 song by the Moffs

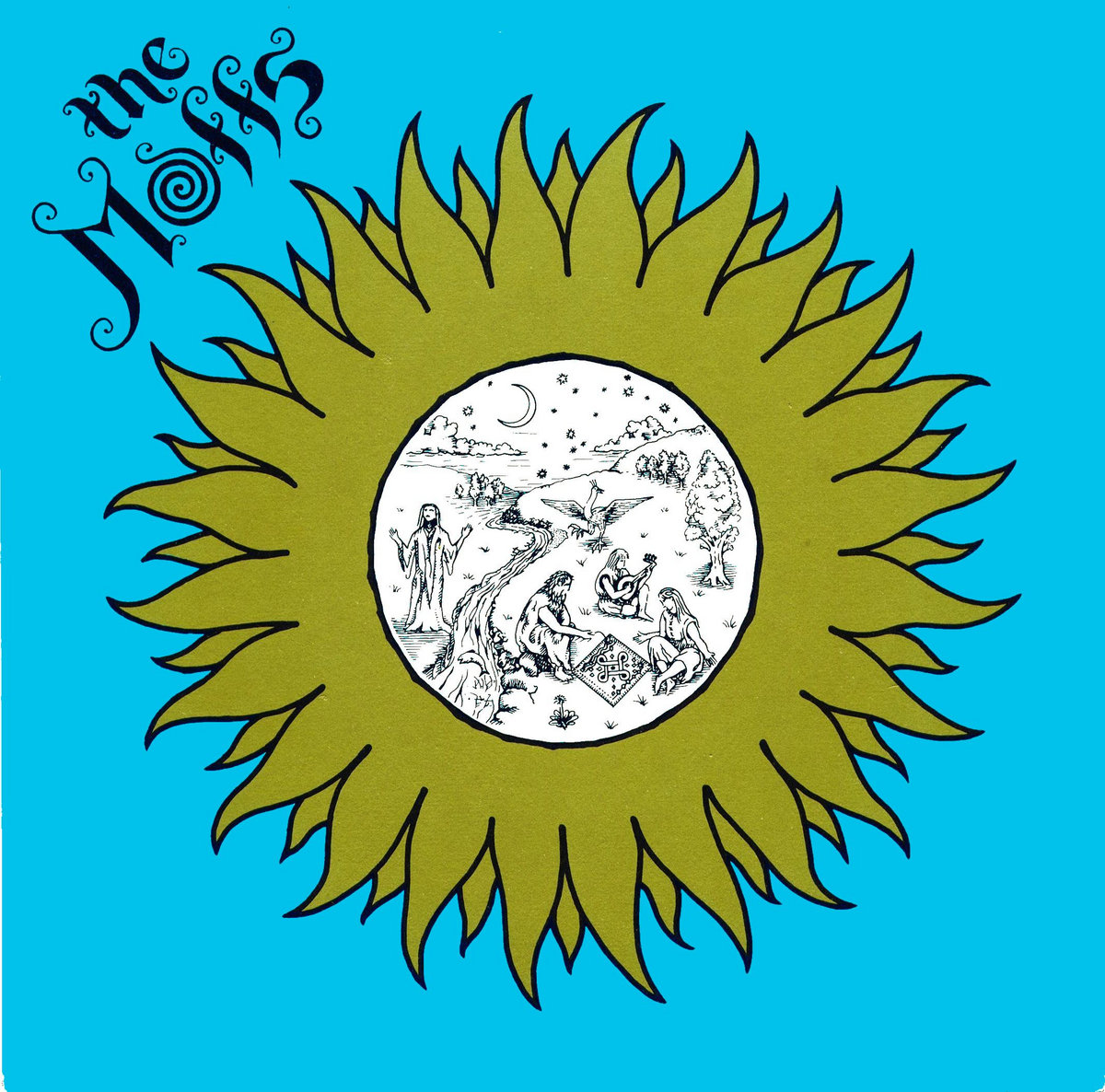

Single by the Moffs
- Released: 21 May 1985
- Recorded: 7 February 1985
- Studio: Paradise (Sydney)
- Genre: Neo-psychedelia
- Length: 4:51
- Label: Citadel
- Songwriter: Tom Kazas
- Producer: Chris Logan

"Another Day in the Sun" is a song by Australian rock band the Moffs. It was originally released as a 7" vinyl single in May 1985 on the Citadel Records label. The song became a signature song of the band. It was recorded at Paradise Studios in Sydney in February 1985. It was produced by Chris Logan, and engineered by Tom Colly. It was the band's first vinyl single, that followed their initial self-titled six-track cassette.

== Writing ==
The song was written by Tom Kazas, vocalist and guitarist of the Moffs. Kazas recalls that the song was influenced more by early Brian Eno than by 60s psychedelia. It is an example of the experimental nature of Kazas' songwriting for the Moffs.

The form of "Another Day in the Sun" is unconventional in a few ways. The vocal only enters after a long guitar solo. It has only seventeen lines, and then exits, to return to the guitar solo again. The four chords of the song, G/D/C/Em, were not unusual in themselves, but their re-arrangement was. The change from the more ubiquitous C/D/Em/C to the rarer G/D/C/Em, gave the song a dramatic and altered feel. The separately staggered entry of the instruments: drums – bass guitar – organ – guitar – voice, was also unusual. The fade out of the band at the ending of the songs reveals a piano arpeggiating the chords, was also unconventional. At a length of 4:51 it was rather long as a single, but this did not hinder the song being played on extensively on radio at the time.

The guitar solo is a semi-improvised take that only came to life in the studio when producer Chris Logan urged Kazas to turn on his tube screamer pedal, that he usually used live, but had strangely left off in an attempt to try for a different sound. The lyrics, a short poem, can be interpreted as positive and uplifting, but also somewhat melancholic. Kazas thinks this juxtaposition is also part of the song’s appeal.

== Cover art ==
The front cover art was designed and hand drawn by graphic artist Benevision, a.k.a. Benjamin Evison. It is a literal rendering of the song title, with four people, ostensibly the four band members, 'in' the sun. Benevision created most of the visual material for the band, including cassette covers, album covers, posters and flyers.

== Reception ==
"Another Day in the Sun" became a major independent success in Australia and internationally. It reached no.1 on the Australian Independent Charts and stayed in the top 20 for over four months. Australian music magazine Rock Australia Magazine (RAM) at the time wrote, "The Moffs have strung together every solemn rock'n'roll cliché and somehow succeeded in creating the most perfect yearning melancholy spine-tingler since White Rabbit". The song was also embraced by the underground music scenes in the UK and Europe, with Jon Storey of influential UK fanzine Bucketfull of Brains calling it "single of the year...this is the best of the flawless series of Citadel singles, and believe me, the competition is fierce".

== B-side ==
"Clarodomineaux" is the B-side of the single, written by Tom Kazas. The song's name is a portmanteaux of 'Clarendon' (name of the Clarendon Hotel in Surry Hills, Sydney), and 'dominoes' (the tile game). The 'eaux' suffix extended the word play of the title. Playing dominoes at the Clarendon Hotel was a favourite past-time of David Byrnes (bass player) and Alan Hislop (drummer) at the time of recording the song. Apart from the more recognisable 60s-style rock riff, the song is notable for its middle section. This has a 3/4-time lilt, that along with the chords and melodies, give this section a medieval folk feel. It also features a vocal by Tatjana Grujic. The lyrics allude to the unstable nature of words, to the doubt created by language itself, and to the logic it entrenches.

== Personnel ==
- Tom Kazas – guitar, vocals, piano
- David Byrnes – bass guitar
- Alan Hislop – drums
- Nick Potts – organ
- Tatjana Grujic – vocals on "Clarodomineaux"

== Usage in media ==
- The song was used in a 2010 episode of the Australian TV series Spirited. It appears on the series soundtrack.
- The song was used in an Australian Vogue Ksubi fashion show in 2010.
- Jagwar Ma + Dreems covered the song in 2015.
- Words of the song are physically embodied at a memorial at Leighton Beach, Fremantle Beach, Western Australia.
