= Caressing Swine =

Single by Died Pretty

from the album Trace
- Released: June 1993
- Recorded: Studio 227, Sydney
- Length: 4:08
- Label: Columbia Records
- Songwriter(s): Ronald Peno, Brett Myers
- Producer(s): Hugh Jones

Died Pretty singles chronology
| "Sweetheart" (1992) | "Caressing Swine" (1993) | "Harness Up" (1993) |

"Caressing Swine" is a song by Australian alternative rock band Died Pretty. It was released in June 1993 as the lead single from their fifth studio album Trace. The song peaked at number 74 on the ARIA Charts.

== Reception ==
Professional ratings
Review scores
| Source | Rating |
|---|---|
| Allmusic | 3/5 stars |

Ned Raggett from AllMusic called the song "one of the band's best slow-burn numbers". Raggett called out the B-side "This Reason" and "A Song for Me", saying "'This Reason' is a tight little number, Hoey's Hammond organ a nice link to the band's past, while ('A Song for Me') is a slower, gentle song that's a low-key winner." Raggett continued saying, "The surprise highlight, taken from a radio performance, comes at the very end, 'The Cross', a remake of the dramatic epic from Prince's Sign O' the Times album."

== Track listing ==
Australian CD & 7" single (Columbia – 659411 2)

1. "Caressing Swine" - 4:08
2. "This Reason" - 3:21
3. "A Song for Me" - 4:57
4. "The Cross" (recorded live at JJJ at the Wireless) - 5:46

== Charts ==
Weekly chart performance of "Caressing Swine"
| Chart (1993) | Peak position |
|---|---|
| Australia (ARIA) | 74 |
