= Everydaydream =

Studio album by Died Pretty
- Released: October 2000
- Recorded: Paradise Studios, June 2000
- Genre: Rock
- Length: 47:38
- Label: Citadel
- Producer: Wayne Connolly, Died Pretty

Died Pretty chronology
Using My Gills as a Roadmap (1998)	Everydaydream (2000)	Something We Left Behind (2016)

Singles from Everydaydream
- 1. "That Look Before" / "Misunderstood" Released: November 2000

Professional ratings
Review scores
Source	Rating
AllMusic	4/5 stars
The Courier-Mail	4/5 stars
The Daily Telegraph	4/5 stars
Sunday Herald Sun	3/5 stars

Everydaydream is the eighth and final studio album by the Australian rock band Died Pretty. The album, recorded with producer Wayne Connolly and released in October 2000, injected a strongly electronic feel into the band's sound with its extensive use of synthesizers and drum machines.

== Track listing ==
(All songs by Brett Myers and Ron Peno)

1. "Misunderstood" – 5:00
2. "Brighter Ideas" – 3:30
3. "Special Way" – 3:49
4. "Burning Mad" – 5:53
5. "That Look Before" – 3:59
6. "Here Comes the Night" – 5:56
7. "Call Me Sir" – 4:54
8. "Dream Alone" – 4:27
9. "Watch Out Below" – 5:20
10. "The Evening Shadows"– 4:50

== Personnel ==
- Ron S. Peno — vocals
- Brett Myers — guitar
- John Hoey — keyboards
- Robert Warren — bass guitar
- Simon Cox — drums
