= Tom Kazas =

Australian performer, composer, producer, and film maker (born 1965)

Tom Kazas (born 1965 in Sydney, Australia) is an Australian performer, composer, producer, and short film maker.

Kazas was the singer, guitarist, songwriter/composer of the Australian psychedelic rock group the Moffs (1984–1989), who garnered international underground attention in 1985 with their song "Another Day in the Sun".

Kazas continues to produce varied music: from the avant-rock "Sisyphus Happy," to the modern classical "Verdigris," to experimental electronica of "Argot," and to the post-croon of "Metastatic" and "Libidinizer".

Kazas has composed for theatre, including the 1999 staging of "The Wound", directed by Lex Marinos.

Kazas was the composer and arranger for the Greek Jazz band Xitzaz.

Kazas has produced albums for T J Eckleberg, Magic Lunchbox, Metabass'n'Breath, Tiny Tim, and You Am I.

Kazas composed the soundtrack for The Ifs of Language, a short film by Peter Lyssiotis and Michael Karris, which was a finalist in the 2002 Dendy Short Film Festival.

Kazas has made several music videos and short films, including the 2009 16 minute cinema poem 'The Topologist'. Most recently he has made a video-cycle of four pieces for the songs from his ep 'Libidinizer'.

He released his most recent album, Dysomphē, in 2026.

== Discography ==
=== Solo albums ===
- Deliquescence 1989 (Third Eye Records)
- Book of Saturday 1993 (Saturday Records)
- Tom Kazas 1995 (Ravenswood Records)
- Saint or Fool 1997 (Hitch Hyke Records)
- Telemetry 2003 (TKMusic)
- Fleeting Eternities 2006 (TKMusic)
- Verdigris 2011 (TKMusic)
- Melbn Pyxis ep 2012 (TKMusic)
- Sisyphus Happy ep 2013 (TKMusic)
- Manoeuvres 1995-2005 2015 (TKMusic)
- Argot 2017 (TKMusic)
- Love, They Said, With Their Backs To The Precipice 2019 (TKMusic)
- Metastatic 2023 (TKMusic)
- Libidinizer ep 2025 (TKMusic)
- Dysomphē 2026 (TKMusic)

=== Compilation Contributions ===
- The Thing: From Another World vol. 3' CD 16th Issue 1996 Athens
- Revolution in a Room: CD37 Audio World Magazine 1997 Athens
- Floralia 3 1998 Italy/Netherlands (Mizmaze/WoT4 Records)
- The Vegetable Man 10" Project (OVNI Records - Italia - 2003) a tribute to Syd Barrett
- Midday Moon 2018 Australia (Bedroom Suck Records)
- Yes Yes: An Unfashionable Compilation 2023 Australia (Garden Seat)

=== Collaborations ===
- Bob Armstrong and the Navigators 1990 (Ravenswood Records)
- In A Sea With by Taj Orange 1991
- Shift the Teli by the Ducers 1996
- The Wound by Tom Kazas and Others 1999 (Sidetrack Theatre)
- Turbulence by Xitzaz 1999
- Something Like An Emergency with Josephine Scicluna 2010
- Conversation in an Air Raid Shelter with Josephine Scicluna 2013

=== With "The Moffs" ===
- "Another Day in the Sun" 1985
- Flowers 1986
- The Moffs 1986
- The Traveller 1987
- Labyrinth 1988
- Psychedelicatessen 1994
- The Moffs: The Collection 2008
- A Young Person's Guide 2018
- Trails 2018

== Filmography ==
- Traces 9 mins 2002
- The Topologist 16 mins 2009
- The Room 2 mins 2009
- Post Utopian Pause 5 mins 2009
- Collection of Cuts 7 mins 2012
- Transfusion [TJ Eckleberg Remix] 6 mins 2014
- Condenser 4 mins 2018
- Libidinizer Cycle 18 mins 2025
