= Doughboy Hollow =

Studio album by Died Pretty
- Released: August 1991
- Recorded: Trafalgar Studios, Annandale, Sydney, April 1991
- Genre: Rock
- Length: 47:36
- Labels: Blue Mosque; Beggars Banquet
- Producer: Hugh Jones

Died Pretty chronology
| Every Brilliant Eye (1990) | Doughboy Hollow (1991) | Trace (1993) |

Singles from Doughboy Hollow
- 1. "Stop Myself" Released: June 1991; 2. "D.C." Released: September 1991; 3. "Sweetheart" Released: February 1992

Doughboy Hollow is the fourth album by Australian rock band Died Pretty. The album, recorded with English producer Hugh Jones, was released in 1991.

Described by Ian McFarlane's Encyclopedia of Australian Rock and Pop as "brimming with passionate, dramatic and alluring musical vistas", it took the band into the Top 20 album charts for the first time, peaking at No.19 in September 1991. The album led to three ARIA Award nominations in 1992—Album of the Year for Doughboy Hollow, Independent Single of the Year for "D.C." and Best Video, also for "D.C.". It was also included in the 2010 book 100 Best Australian Albums.

== Recording and release ==
The band "road-tested" the songs to a greater extent than their recent albums. Guitarist Myers said, "In the past, we'd choose 10 or 12 songs and go into the studio and record them. But this time around we recorded 20 and could pick and choose. With this one, we did kinda play them to people a few times before we recorded them."

Juke noted that compared to previous albums, Peno's lyrics were, "startlingly clear and direct." Myers said, "In the old days, he wanted us to mix his voice down on the records. But the more confident he's become as a writer, and the more proud he's become of his words, the more he wants them to ne heard."

At the time of release, "try before you buy" free sample packs where offered at some retailers in Victoria.

== Impact and legacy ==
Reviewed at the time of release, Juke said, "Died Pretty's ability to go from ferocious speed attack to building near Doorsian atmosphere, as well as the songs themselves, should put them in the top rank of Australian bands."

Interviewed in 1996, five years after Doughboy Hollow's 1991 release, singer and co-writer Ron Peno said the album remained the band's creative watermark. "Now there's an album that should have done something," he told the Daily Telegraph. "It's a very loved album and I think it was a special record for us. I think it was criminal that it got ignored."

Thirty years after the album's release, Double J featured Doughboy Hollow on their weekly Classic Albums show in August 2021. Caroline Tran reflected that "Doughboy Hollow should have made Died Pretty a household name", and that "its songs show the Sydney band at the peak of their creative powers." She concluded: "Thirty years on though, it is clear Doughboy Hollow occupies a special place in Australian music, popping up with stubborn consistency on essential albums lists to this day."

Named the 96th best Australian album by Rolling Stone Australia in 2021, they said, "More closely aligned with the overcast melodies of bands like R.E.M. and the Dream Syndicate, the Sydney ensemble were almost anti-grunge in their love of crystalline adornment and poetic melodrama. And most damning of all, singer Ron Peno rendered his tortured emotions through subtle delicacy rather than angsty outbursts."

== Track listing ==
(All songs by Brett Myers and Ron Peno except where noted)

1. "Doused" – 4:10
2. "D.C." (Ron Peno, Steve Clark) – 4:33
3. "Sweetheart" – 4:13
4. "Godbless" (Ron Peno, John Hoey) – 3:31
5. "Satisfied" – 6:04
6. "Stop Myself" – 3:34
7. "Battle of Stanmore" – 2:19
8. "The Love Song" – 5:00
9. "Disaster" – 3:54
10. "Out in the Rain"– 4:21
11. "Turn Your Head" – 5:19

== Personnel ==
- Ron Peno — vocals
- Brett Myers — guitar
- John Hoey — keyboards
- Steve Clark — bass
- Chris Welsh — drums

=== Additional personnel ===
- Amanda Brown — violin ("The Love Song," "D.C.," "Battle of Stanmore")
- Sarah Peet — cello ("The Love Song," "D.C.," "Disaster")
- Sunil de Silva — percussion

== Charts ==
Weekly chart performance for Doughboy Hollow
| Chart (1991) | Peak position |
|---|---|
| Australian Albums (ARIA) | 24 |
| Chart (2026) | Peak position |
| Australian Vinyl Albums (ARIA) | 11 |
