= EG Awards of 2008 =

Annual Australian music awards ceremony

- Date: 4 December 2008
- Venue: Prince of Wales, Melbourne, Victoria

Highlights
- Most nominations: Geoffrey Gurrumul Yunupingu (4)

The EG Awards of 2008 are the third and Annual The Age EG (Entertainment Guide) Awards and took place at the Prince of Wales on 4 December 2008.

== Hall of Fame inductees ==
Died Pretty

== Performers ==
- Died Pretty
- Little Red the EG Allstars
- Dave Faulkner
- Mark Seymour
- Katy Steele

== Award nominees and winners ==
Winners are unknown, some nominatees are below.

Best Album	Best Song
Nick Cave and the Bad Seeds - Dig, Lazarus, Dig!!!; The Drones - Havilah	
Best Male	Best Female
Geoffrey Gurrumul Yunupingu	Sophie Koh
Best Band	Best New Art
Nick Cave and the Bad Seeds; The Drones	Little Red
Best Tour	Best Album of All Times
Rage Against the Machine, Festival Hall	Skyhooks - Living in the 70's; You Am I - Hi Fi Way; AC/DC - Back in Black
