= Mick Medew =

Australian singer-songwriter

- Born: Robert Michael Medew; Brisbane, Queensland, Australia
- Genres: Alternative rock
- Occupations: Musician, singer, songwriter, guitarist
- Years active: 1979–present

Robert Michael Medew is an Australian singer-songwriter who fronted The Screaming Tribesmen, which formed in Brisbane in 1981. Medew has written or co-written a number of independent hits, "Igloo", "Date with a Vampyre" and "I Got a Feeling", which peaked at number seven on the Billboard Hot Modern Rock Tracks college charts.

== Biography ==
=== 1979-1998: The 31st & The Screaming Tribesmen ===
Mick Medew as lead vocalist and guitarist formed a straight-ahead hard rock band, The 31st, in Brisbane in 1979, with Ron Peno (ex-The Hellcats) on vocals, Tony Robertson (ex-Credits, ex -Wasted Daze) on bass guitar and Chris Welsh on drums. They were joined by Brad Shepherd (ex-Fun Things) on guitar in mid-1980. Medew and Peno co-wrote "Igloo" and "Stand Alone".

In early 1981, Peno and Welsh left (eventually forming Died Pretty), Robertson and Shepherd joined The Hitmen in Sydney and Medew formed Screaming Tribesmen in Brisbane. Medew recruited John Hartley (ex-Fun Things) on bass guitar and backing vocals and Brad's younger brother Murray Shepherd (ex-Fun Things) on drums. Screaming Tribesmen had a variable line-up and relocated to Sydney. They had a number seven hit single on the Alternative Songs (formerly Billboard Hot Modern Rock Tracks) with the Medew-penned, "I Got a Feeling" in 1988.

=== 2008-2011: Mick Medew and the Rumours ===
In 2008, he formed Mick Medew and the Rumours, after a sabbatical from the music industry, with Ash Geary on guitar and vocals, Paul Hawker on bass guitar and Chris Dixon on drums. The band released a debut album, For Your Love, on I-94 Bar Records in 2009, then toured the east coast of Australia in 2010. They went on hiatus in 2011.

In 2011 the "classic" line-up of the Screaming Tribesmen re-formed to play dates on the east coast of Australia and release re-mastered version of their classic recordings Date with a Vampyre, Top of the Town and Bones and Flowers.

In 2013, Medew released The Mesmerisers with The Mesmerisers.

On 30 March 2015 he was awarded the prestigious GW McLennan Lifetime Achievement Award at the 2015 Queensland Music Awards.

In 2019, Open Season, was released in June 2019 on I-94 Bar Records.

== Discography ==
Title	Details
All Your Love (as Mick Medew and the Rumours )	Released: 2009; Label: I-94 Bar (I94-002); Format: CD, digital download
The Mesmerisers	Released: November 2013; Label: Citadel (CITCD 577); Format: CD, digital download
Open Season (as Mick Medew & The Mesmerisers)	Released: January 2019; Label: I-94 Bar (I94-007); Format: CD, digital download
Psychopharmacologist	Released: 2020; Label: I-94 Bar (I94-008); Format: CD, digital download, streaming

== Awards ==
=== Queensland Music Awards ===
The Queensland Music Awards (previously known as Q Song Awards) are annual awards celebrating Queensland, Australia's brightest emerging artists and established legends. They commenced in 2006.

Year	Nominee / work	Award	Result
2015	himself	Grant McLennan Lifetime Achievement Award	awarded
