= Trace (Died Pretty album) =

Studio album by Died Pretty
- Released: September 1993
- Recorded: February–March 1993
- Studios: Studios 301, Sydney
- Genre: Rock
- Length: 53:29
- Label: Columbia
- Producer: Hugh Jones

Died Pretty chronology
Doughboy Hollow (1991)	Trace (1993)	Sold (1996)

Singles from Trace
- 1. "Caressing Swine" Released: June 1993; 2. "Harness Up" Released: August 1993; 3. "Headaround" Released: November 1993; 4. "A State of Graceful Mourning" Released: 1994

Professional ratings
Review scores
Source	Rating
Allmusic	4/5 stars

Trace is the fifth album by Australian rock band Died Pretty. It was released in September 1993. The album was the most commercially successful of the band's career, peaking at No.11 on the ARIA album charts.

Despite its commercial success, singer and songwriter Ron Peno has expressed disappointment with it. In a 1995 interview he said: "There were some nice moments on Trace, and there were some moments that fell short of the mark. Some songs that just didn't quite get there. It was a valiant attempt, but it didn't make it. Out of all the songs that came from Trace, we only perform one with any regularity, and that's 'Harness Up'. Occasionally we have been doing 'State of Graceful Mourning'—to me, they're the two highlights of the album." Peno acknowledged the production of Trace might have been too polished. "I think we're were getting a bit soft in the sound department. We were losing that hard edge."

In 2011 Peno was still distancing himself from the record. He said that after signing to Sony Records on the strength of 1991's Doughboy Hollow, the band delivered Trace, which turned out to be their weakest album. He told Mess+Noise: "I never liked the album at all. I was weak in my decision-making in saying yes or no to songs. We had (producer) Hugh Jones coming back out to do the album, but it was a bit too soon for him to come out. But I don’t think the songs were strong enough—there were some good songs, but there were some very weak songs, and I should’ve said that at the time, but I didn’t. I took a weak-arsed approach. I could’ve said, 'Stop, right now', whether Hugh Jones was coming or not. We could’ve pushed it out a month or so, but we didn’t.

"People love Trace, but for me personally I thought it was some of my weakest songwriting, and some of Brett (Myers)' weakest songs. Unfortunately for us, it was our first album on a major label — although it did really well overseas. I wish we could have cut out Trace and gone straight to Sold and Using My Gills as a Roadmap."

It was the final Died Pretty album to feature drummer Chris Welsh, and the first to feature bassist Robbie Warren.

== Track listing ==
(All songs by Brett Myers and Ron Peno except where noted)

1. "Harness Up" — 4:07
2. "Caressing Swine" — 4:07
3. "Headaround" — 3:16
4. "Til We Get It Right" (Myers) — 4:06
5. "The Rivers" — 7:15
6. "A State of Graceful Mourning" — 5:53
7. "Just Forever" — 5:28
8. "Through My Heart" (Myers) — 3:47
9. "110 B.P.M." (Hoey, Peno) — 5:07
10. "Dreamaway" (Hoey, Peno) — 5:35
11. "Seize Your Ways" — 4:48

== Personnel ==
- Ron Peno — vocals
- Brett Myers — guitar, lead vocals on 4 & 8
- John Hoey — keyboards
- Chris Welch — drums
- Robert Warren — bass, backing vocals

=== Additional personnel ===
- Sumil De Silva — percussion
- Eleanor Rodgers — harmonies
- Caroline Lavelle — cello
- Jack Howard — trumpet

== Charts ==
Weekly chart performance for Trace
Chart (1993)	Peak position
Australian Albums (ARIA)	11
