= Using My Gills as a Roadmap =

Studio album by Died Pretty
- Released: 1998
- Recorded: Paradise Studios
- Genre: Rock
- Length: 47:21
- Label: Citadel
- Producer: Wayne Connolly, Died Pretty

Died Pretty chronology
Sold (1995)	Using My Gills as a Roadmap (1998)	Everydaydream (2000)

Singles from Using My Gills as a Roadmap
- 1. "Radio" Released: November 1997; 2. "Slide Song" Released: February 1998

Professional ratings
Review scores
Source	Rating
Sydney Morning Herald	3/5 stars
The Age	4/5 stars
The Daily Telegraph	7/10 stars

Using My Gills as a Roadmap is the seventh album by Australian rock band Died Pretty. The album, their second working with producer Wayne Connolly, was released in 1998.

== Details ==
Guitarist and co-songwriter Brett Myers said the album marked a return to more experimental work, with little concern about the potential for radio airplay. "We all made a conscious decision to do something different with this album that we hadn't done before," he said. "We wanted to make songs that didn't have such rigid structures and to get away from the pop groove we'd fallen into a bit in the past."

He said the album was also the one the band had taken most charge of in the production process. "It's a hell of a lot more work—we couldn't lounge around and relax as much. In the end, it's ultimately more rewarding, though. With the stuff on this album, we were so secure with what we wanted to do. I knew the sounds I wanted to create, I had a good idea about what I wanted to get. We ended up writing the songs around the sounds. We listened to lots of late '70s music like Bowie's Low and "Heroes"—especially the second sides, with the really long instrumental passages. We even listened to some of the psychedelic trance that's around at the moment."

Myers said that with the ideas firmly in their minds, the recording process was very quick and most of the album was completed in just two weekends. "It all just fell into place." He said the first single, "Radio", was more similar to the band's earlier material, but said: "The song makes sense in the context of the album. It's a good mid-point, it sort of serves as a cross-over from what we used to do, to now. I think it's a good bridge."

== Reception ==
John Encarnacao at The Sydney Morning Herald said, "Almost absent are the familiar epic electric guitar and organ arrangements that have become the Pretty trademark. Brett Myers favours acoustic tones which make an earthy counterpoint to John Hoey's sometimes ethereal, sometimes buzzing synths. Where electric guitars appear, they slither elliptically la Fripp. And Peno hardly raises his voice throughout the whole disc."

== Track listing ==
(All songs by Brett Myers and Ron Peno)

1. "Slide Song" – 3:59
2. "She Was" – 5:36
3. "Stay" – 5:01
4. "The Daddy Act" – 6:12
5. "Paint It Black, You Devils" – 6:24
6. "Radio" – 4:22
7. "Gone" – 6:05
8. "Away" – 6:03
9. "Drive" – 3:39

== Personnel ==
- Ron Peno — vocals
- Brett Myers — guitar
- John Hoey — keyboards
- Robert Warren — bass
- Simon Cox — drums
