= Porcelain Bus =

Australian musical group

- Origin: Sydney, New South Wales, Australia
- Genres: Rock; R&B
- Years active: 1985–1991
- Labels: Citadel; Blue Mosque/Festival
- Spinoffs: Gentle Assassins
- Spinoff of: Mr Pharmacist
- Past members: Ian James; Robert McKiernan; John Nolan; Paul Patrick; Adam Toole

Porcelain Bus were an Australian rock and R&B group formed in late 1985 by Ian James on lead vocals, Robert McKiernan on lead guitar and vocals, John Nolan on drums and Paul Patrick on bass guitar. They released two studio albums Talking to God (October 1988) and Fragile (July 1990). After touring Europe in late 1990 they returned to Australia where they toured its east coast before breaking up in 1991.

== History ==
Porcelain Bus were formed in Sydney in late 1985 by Ian James on lead vocals, Robert McKiernan on lead guitar and vocals, John Nolan on drums and Paul Patrick on bass guitar. James, McKiernan and Patrick were school friends and had formed Mr Pharmacist early in 1985 as a 1960s acid-punk/R&B group. Porcelain Bus were named for a euphemism for vomiting, "driving the porcelain bus".

The group's debut single "Indignation" (August 1986) was produced by Rob Younger. Australian musicologist Ian McFarlane observed that it "defined the band's sound (sparse, melodic guitar and husky vocals laid over a dark, rumbling rhythm section)." Their second single, "The Well is Dry" (July 1987) and a six-track extended play, Steel Bros (1987) were both produced by Brett Myers (of Died Pretty) for Citadel Records. On the EP's lead track "Talk to Me" Astrid Munday guested on backing vocals. Jim Dwyer of Tharunka praised James' "appealing" vocals on "The Well Is Dry" and its use of slide and acoustic guitar. Dwyer found Steel Bros to be an "absolutely excellent a killer record."

Myers also produced their debut studio album Talking to God, which was issued in October 1988. Nostalgia Central's writer felt it "presented a great mix of strong rockers and softer tracks". It provided two singles "Own Little World" (October) and "Rats" (June 1989). Adam Toole replaced Nolan on drums in November 1989. The group issued their second album Fragile in July 1990, which included the single "Blue on Blue" (June). The album was described by Penelope Layland of The Canberra Times as "excellent" and displaying "rich guitar rock with a '60s edge and a dominant, complex rhythm line." Citadel Records authorised a compilation album Sacred Relics (1990) for release in Europe and the group supported it with a European tour later that year. Upon return to Australia they undertook an east coast tour and disbanded in 1991.

In 1995 Ian James (as Ian Towart) and Rob McKiernan formed Gentle Assassins as a "hard rocknpop and alt.country" five-piece band. Other members were Iain Jepson on keyboards, Andrew Lay on drums and James Lacey on bass guitar and vocals. The group released their debut album They Knew too Much (March 2005) via Endgame Records, which was produced by Shane Fahey.

== Members ==
- Ian James (a.k.a. Ian Towart) – lead vocals
- Robert McKiernan – lead guitar, vocals
- John Nolan – drums, vocals
- Paul Patrick – bass guitar
- Adam Toole – drums

== Discography ==
=== Albums ===
- Talking to God (October 1988) – Citadel Records (CIT LP 519)
- Fragile (July 1990) – Citadel/Festival Records (CGAS 814), Blue Mosque (L30368)
- Sacred Relics (compilation, 1990) – Citadel (CGAS 811), Blue Mosque/Festival Records

=== Extended plays ===
- Steel Bros – Citadel Records (CIT LP 508)

=== Singles ===
- "Indignation" (1986) – Citadel Records (CIT 021)
- "The Well is Dry" (1987) – Citadel Records (CIT 030)
- "Own Little World" (1988) – Citadel Records (CIT 041)
- "Rats" (1989) – Citadel Records (CIT 048)
- "Blue on Blue" (1990) – Blue Mosque Records (K10087)
