= Fun Things =

Australian punk rock band

The Fun Things
- Origin: Brisbane, Queensland, Australia
- Genres: Punk rock, Detroit rock
- Years active: 1979–1980
- Labels: Pennimann
- Past members: Murray Shepherd; Brad Shepherd; John Hartley; Graeme Beavis

The Fun Things were a punk rock band that was formed during the heyday period of punk rock. Known for their admiration of Radio Birdman, they also have been documented as being "modeled on almost exclusively on the Radio Birdman/Stooges/Sex Pistols mould". Original band members were Brad Shepherd on guitar and vocals, John Hartley on bass guitar, Graeme Beavis on guitar and Murray Shepherd on drums. Brad Shepherd and Murray Shepherd were brothers in the band, which released one highly acclaimed E.P. and has become "one of the most collectable artifacts from Australia's punk rock era".

The Fun Things were a primary group behind Brisbane's second wave punk scene between 1978 and 1980. According to music historian, Ian McFarlane, Brisbane produced "some of the most anarchistic bands of the Australian punk rock era" and that it was a city nationally renowned for its ultra conservatism. After The Fun Things dissolved both Shepherd brothers eventually went on to subsequent profile bands such as The Hitmen, The Hoodoo Gurus for Brad Shepherd and The Screaming Tribesmen for Murray Shepherd with John Hartley. In 1984 Beavis was a member of The Apartments.

== History ==
The Fun Things existed between 1979 and 1980, however, they were previously known as The Aliens in Brisbane during 1978. Coincidentally, there was another band called The Aliens from Adelaide at the same time. This other band were considered more new wave orientated. The Brisbane punk rock "Aliens" members featured Brad Shepherd on guitar and vocals, bassist John Hartley, and Murray Shepherd on drums but dissolved to form the Phantom Agents for a phase without Hartley.

After the Phantom Agents, The original Aliens reformed as The Fun Things with The Phantom Agents guitarist Graeme Beavis. This outfit rapidly gained a strong local following, which was due to their tight and energetic live shows.

The Fun Things were still teenagers but managed to record a self titled E.P. in 1980. Brad Shepherd recollections of this period were, "It was just part of the punk process. It was something you wanted to do. We were still at school at the time. I borrowed 400 bucks from my parents to make the thing happen". The songs were "mixed gutsy guitar riffs, breakneck tempos, punk attitude and youthful exuberance in equal measure," according to Ian McFarlane. McFarlane also claimed that, "The Fun Things issued what has emerged as one of the most collectable artefacts of the Australian punk rock era, the Fun Things EP which came in a pressing of only 500 copies." In 2000 the EP was re-released on Pennimann Records from Spain. Some of the tracks in the past had been subject to bootlegging from outside Australia.

The Fun Things earliest beginnings started in the mid 1970s with Brad Shepherd and John Hartley meeting each other to practice at their homes. According to Brad Shepherd, they used to practice Zeppelin and Sabbath and Deep Purple songs in Hartley's rumpus room, or at his place. He lived at The Gap, which is in the western suburbs of Brisbane and Hartley lived at Tarragindi, which is South. They were 14 at the time so they would get their mothers to drive them to each other's place and practice on Sunday afternoons. They did that for a couple of years until Shepherd started reading in RAM (Rock Australia Magazine) about Radio Birdman.

The band split in 1980 at the time of their E.P. release, which was followed by Brad Shepherd joining The 31st, an alternative rock outfit from Brisbane. Later on he joined The Hitmen, then The Hoodoo Gurus. Murray Shepherd and Hartley went to form The Screaming Tribesmen in 1981 with Mick Medew and Ronnie Peno from The 31st. Graeme Beavis went on join The Apartments in 1984.

== Legacy ==
Songs from the original E.P., Savage and When The Birdman Fly were included on several Australian CD compilations during the 2000s. Also during the early 2000s the Shepherd brothers formed a band called The Monarchs, which was loosely based on the Fun Things and Hitmen. A CD called Make Yer Own Fun was released by The Monarchs in 2001. The original recording of Savage had also been included as part of the 2015 CD Compilation called "Stranded, The Chronicles Of Australian Punk". This CD was a wide retrospective of Australian punk, officially released by the Australian Broadcasting Corporation's Four by Four label.

== Personnel ==
- Brad Shepherd – Guitar, Lead Vocals
- Graeme Beavis – Guitar, Vocals
- John Hartley – Bass, Vocals
- Murray Shepherd – Drums, Vocals

== Discography ==
- Fun Things – 7-inch E.P. 1980

"When The Birdman Fly", "Lipstick", "(I Ain't Got) Time Enough for Love", "Savage"

- Fun Things – 7 inch E.P. 2000, Pennimann Records PENN-EP005

"When The Birdman Fly", "Lipstick", "(I Ain't Got) Time Enough for Love", "Savage"

Tracks on compilation CD

- "Savage" – CD, Behind the Banana Curtain – 4zzz, 2001
- "Savage" – CD, Do the Pop! The Australian Garage-Rock Sound 1976–1987 – Shock Records, 2002
- "When The Birdman Fly" – CD, Tales from the AUSTRALIAN UNDERGROUND – Shock, 2003
- "When The Birdman Fly", "Lipstick", "(I Ain't Got) Time Enough for Love", "Savage" – CD, Murder Punk volume 2 – Murder Punk
