= Sold (Died Pretty album) =

Studio album by Died Pretty
- Released: February 1996
- Genre: Rock
- Length: 52:33
- Label: Columbia
- Producer: Wayne Connolly, Rob Younger

Died Pretty chronology
Trace (1993)	Sold (1996)	Using My Gills as a Roadmap (1998)

Singles from Sold
- 1. "Cuttin' Up Her Legs" Released: September 1995; 2. "Good at Love" Released: November 1995

Professional ratings
Review scores
Source	Rating
Sydney Morning Herald	4/5 stars
The Daily Telegraph	9.5/10 stars

Sold is the sixth album by Australian rock band Died Pretty. It was released in 1996 and peaked at No. 29 on the ARIA album charts. The album was the last to include drummer, Nick Kennedy, who left during recording; he was replaced in the sessions by Shane Melder, on loan from Sidewinder. It was co-produced by former Radio Birdman vocalist Rob Younger, who had produced the band's 1986 debut Free Dirt, and Wayne Connolly, who went on to co-produce their next two albums.

Singer and song co-writer Ron Peno said the album's lyrics, inspired by the departure of his long-time girlfriend, were very personal. He told the Herald Sun: "Every song can actually move me to tears. It was something I had to get out of my system. It was something that was happening in my life and it stopped happening and I'm trying to get over it."

The Age called the album a classic, the Sydney Morning Herald described it as "magnificent" and the Herald Sun's review said: "While it retains some of the rough edges associated with previous records, Sold is mostly pristine and polished, and pitched squarely at commercial radio."

It was Died Pretty's second and final album for Sony Records. The company dropped the band from its roster in April 1996.

== Track listing ==
(All songs by Brett Myers and Ron Peno except where noted)

1. "Sold" – 2:56
2. "Cuttin' Up Her Legs" – 3:10
3. "Good at Love" – 2:51
4. "Cry" – 4:53
5. "Slipaway" – 3:14
6. "B.loved" – 5:11
7. "She's Not There" – 3:02
8. "Stops 'n' Starts" – 3:12
9. "Which Way to Go" – 4:36
10. "1,2,3" – 4:00
11. "How I Feel" – 4:06
12. "Comin' Down" (Brett Myers, Ron Peno, Robert Warren) – 4:02
13. "Hallelujah" – 7:11

== Personnel ==
- Brett Myers – guitar
- John Hoey – keyboards
- Ron Peno – vocals
- Robert Warren – bass
- Shane Melder – drums
- Nick Kennedy – drums
- Sunil de Silva – strings

== Charts ==
Weekly chart performance for Sold
Chart (1996)	Peak position
Australian Albums (ARIA)	29
