= The Thought Criminals (Australian band) =

Australian punk band

- Origin: Sydney, Australia
- Genres: Punk
- Years active: 1977–1981
- Labels: Doublethink; Green
- Past members: Roger Grierson; Rique Lee Kendall; Bruce Warner; Mark Kingsmill; Ken Doyle; Stephen Philip; John Hoey

The Thought Criminals were an influential and enterprising Australian punk band based in Sydney. They formed in late 1977 and disbanded in late 1981. The "angular, fast and quirky punk rock" of the Thought Criminals "was a fixture in the burgeoning Sydney underground scene." The band's name was derived from the concept of 'thoughtcrimes' (unapproved thoughts) from George Orwell's book, Nineteen Eighty-Four. The Thought Criminals exemplified the do-it-yourself punk ethos of the late 1970s, with which they combined considerable business acumen. The band members formed the Doublethink record label and agency which provided recording and live performance opportunities for other new bands.

== History ==
=== An inner-city punk band ===
The Thought Criminals were formed in late 1977 with the initial line-up of Roger Grierson (aka Jack Boots; guitar), Rique Lee Kendall (aka Matt Black; bass) and Bruce Warner (aka Kit Identity; vocals). Various drummers played in the band during this early period. The band's first gigs were at Blondies in Bondi Junction in Sydney's Eastern Suburbs. Inspired by the DIY ethic of the Desperate Bicycles, the Thought Criminals' first recording was the EP Hilton Bomber, with Mark Kingsmill (aka Jim Boots) on drums. The EP was the inaugural release on the band's own Doublethink label.

Rique Lee Kendall left to join the Last Words and, in turn, the Last Words' drummer, Ken Doyle (aka Derik Wapillspoon), joined the Thought Criminals. With the inclusion of Stephen Philip (aka Vivi Sector) on guitar, Roger Grierson switched to bass. By the end of 1978 John Hoey (aka The General) had also joined the Thought Criminals, playing keyboards.

The Thought Criminals built up a following with performances at mainly inner-city venues. The music of the Thought Criminals, in their early recordings and live performances, has been described as a "jagged, frantic sound". Their songs often had an irreverent sense of humour, perhaps exemplified by the following extract from "Fun" (1978): "Don’t want no top ten hit / Don’t want no disco shit / Just wanna have fun".

The Thought Criminals' debut album, Speed. Madness.. Flying Saucers…, was released in February 1980. The songs were recorded in three separate sessions spread over a period of eighteen months. The Thought Criminals' Doublethink label evolved from a record label to include agency and PR functions. Other less-established bands such as Tactics, Popular Mechanics and Sekret Sekret became incorporated within the Doublethink stable.

In 1980 the band toured beyond the precincts of their usual inner-city venues, at the end of which they announced their intention to retire from live performances. In their own words: "The band were not enamoured of the Music Business and had made a pact that when it wasn’t fun they’d call it a day – so when it wasn’t, they did". The Thought Criminals' final gig was at Chequers in inner-city Sydney on 29 August 1980.

In their studio phase during the following year the Thought Criminals recorded a second album, You Only Think Twice, which "revealed the band expanding its scope with a more considered and diverse approach". In late 1981 the band played a live show at Chequers, after which the Thought Criminals disbanded.

Roger Grierson, Warren Fahey and rock journalist Stuart Coupe set up the Green record label in the early 1980s. Grierson continued to work in band and tour management, eventually attaining the position of Managing Director of PolyGram Music Publishing, and later Chairman of Festival Records. In 1982 guitarist Stephen Philip joined Do-Ré-Mi. In 1988 keyboardist John Hoey joined Died Pretty. Bruce Warner became an animator and the drummer Ken Doyle works in computing.

=== Occasional resurrections ===
In July 2005 a retrospective two-CD anthology (Chrono-logical) was released, which featured all the Thought Criminals' recordings released under the Doublethink and GREEN labels. On 4 February 2006 the band reformed for a one-off performance at the Annandale Hotel to publicise the CD. On the subject of reforming the Thought Criminals after 25 years Roger Grierson commented: "It seemed like everybody was doing it and with the release of the CD, and we put a website up to give away all the songs for free, it dragged a few people out of the woodwork".

In September 2006 the Thought Criminals took the stage again in a concert with Buzzcocks at Sydney's Century Theatre. In February 2007 they again reformed to play with T.V. Smith of The Adverts at the Annandale Hotel.

== Discography ==
=== Singles & EPs ===
- Hilton Bomber EP (Doublethink DTDT1, June 1978) – "Hilton Bomber" / "I Won’t Pay (for Punk Records)" / "Fun" / "O Bleak T.V."
- Food for Thoughtcrimes EP (Doublethink DTDT2, July 1979) – "More Suicides Please" / "The Cut-out Man" / "Display-Response: Action" / "So All the Superheroes" / "Stolen Air"
- "Edge of Time" / "Equidistance" (Doublethink DTDT10, August 1980)
- "Land of the Living Room" / "Oceania Oceania" (one-sided 7-inch gig giveaway - 29 August 1980)
- Peace, Love and Under Surveillance EP (7-inch reformation gig giveaway; 2007) – "Forty Days" / "Red Fingers" / "Noel Brown’s Visit" / "DNA" / "Takeover Target"
- "LOCKDOWN TOWN" (Online release - YouTube, August 2020)

=== Albums ===
- Speed. Madness.. Flying Saucers… (Doublethink DTDT8, February 1980)
- You Only Think Twice (Green / Larrikin LRG-082, October 1981)
- Chrono-Logical (Ascension Records, July 2005)
