= Ron S. Peno =

Australian musician (1955–2023)

- Photo by Tony Mott

Background information
- Also known as: Ron S. Peno
- Born: Ronald Stephen Peno; 26 July 1955; Boggabri, New South Wales, Australia
- Origin: NSW, Australia
- Died: 11 August 2023 (aged 68) Melbourne, Victoria, Australia
- Genres: Punk; rock; alternative rock
- Occupations: Performer; singer; songwriter
- Instrument: Vocals
- Years active: 1973–2023
- Labels: Citadel; Sony
- Formerly of: Uncle Mils; The Frozen Stiffs; Hellcats; The Screaming Tribesmen; The 31st; Died Pretty; Noises And Other Voices; The Darling Downs; Ron S. Peno and the Superstitions
- Spouse: Biba Charity Peno

Ronald Stephen Peno (26 July 1955 – 11 August 2023), who also performed as Ron S. Peno and Ronnie Pop, was an Australian rock singer and songwriter who fronted Died Pretty from 1983 to 2021.

Prior to forming Died Pretty (1983-2002), Peno was founder and frontman of punk band The Hellcats (1976-1977), followed by hard rock band The 31st (1979-1981) and a brief stint with The Screaming Tribesmen (1981).

After settling in Melbourne in 2003, Peno formed the alt-country duo The Darling Downs with Kim Salmon. During this time he worked on several other collaborative projects including experimental electronica album Noises and Other Voices with Died Pretty guitarist Brett Myers; as well as writing and recording with Melbourne outfits Black Pony Express; Penny Ikinger; and Black Cab, before forming Ron S. Peno & The Superstitions.

== Biography ==
Ron S. Peno was born at Boggabri District Hospital on 26 July 1955 and grew up in Baan Baa, regional NSW. He attended secondary school in Narrabri where he made up a band name, Virgin Frogs, he later explained "[it] was just something I had in the country, I made up a band name. A very left field thing to do. I put it into 'Sounds Blasts' (music column.) My friend and I were at school in Narribri [sic] and put it in to see if they'd print it." After completing high school Peno moved to Gosford where he joined Uncle Mils, with Warwick Fraser, which he described, "We were going through the glam thing together and they were looking for a lead singer. The classic Stones line-up. I just went out to Ettalong Memorial Hall – glammed up – and did a few songs from Get Yer Ya-Ya's Out! The Rolling Stones in Concert. 'Do you guys know "Straycat Blues?", do you know "Live with Me"?' So I was in. We did a couple of shows in Gosford and that was it."

Peno, as Ronnie Pop, on lead vocals and Charlie Georges on lead guitar, briefly joined the Frozen Stiffs, which "were more or less Mark Taylor's band... They wanted to do something and we were like, 'No, let's form our own band'." The pair formed the Hellcats in Sydney in 1976, as "a tough New York Dolls-inspired covers band" according to Australian musicologist, Ian McFarlane. Peno attempted song writing with Georges, "I tried to write something but nothing came of it. I don't know why – we'd have a verse or a chorus, but it never went beyond that." They supported shows by local punk rockers, Radio Birdman, Peno reflected, "I think The Hellcats only lasted about three or four months, but in that time we played shows with [them], yeah." He developed a friendship with Deniz Tek and Rob Younger of Radio Birdman.

Peno relocated to Brisbane and, in 1979, he formed a hard rock band, the 31st, with Mick Medew as co-lead vocalist and guitarist, Tony Robertson (ex-Credits) on bass guitar and Chris Welsh on drums. They were joined by Brad Shepherd (ex-Fun Things) on lead guitar in mid-1980. Peno and Medew co-wrote "Igloo" and "Stand Alone" for the group. Peno explained his writing "['Igloo'] actually came from me reading Franz Kafka's Metamorphosis. It was me talking about an igloo being all white and positive, the Shoeshine Boys being negative. The black-and-white, positive-negative thing, you know. Optimism and pessimism. I dunno, one of those silly things I was going through when I was very young." McFarlane observed "[they were] roundly disliked on the close-knit, post-punk, inner-city Brisbane scene."

Early in 1981, the 31st disbanded, Peno and Medew formed Screaming Tribesmen, which performed "Igloo" and "Stand Alone". However the early line-up "didn't work out." Peno told members of another Brisbane-based group, the End, "they were great but needed a lead singer, and he was the man they needed." That group disbanded in 1983 and in April, Peno formed a rock group, Final Solution, with Frank Brunetti on keyboards (ex-Super K) and Brett Myers on lead guitar and backing vocals (ex-the End, No Dance). Briefly Younger, of Radio Birdman, was their early drummer. After five gigs in Brisbane they changed their name to Died Pretty which Peno supplied, "No-one in Ron's new group actually liked Died Pretty as a name, but they didn't dislike it either." The band relocated to Sydney, where they were joined by Colin Barwick on drums and Jonathan Lickliter on bass guitar (both ex-the End).

Died Pretty signed with Citadel Records – Younger was their in-house producer – which issued their debut single, "Out of the Unknown" (April 1984). The track was co-written by Peno and Myers – the group's mainstays. They issued eight studio albums, Free Dirt (August 1986), Lost (June 1988), Every Brilliant Eye (April 1990, ARIA Albums Chart No. 79), Doughboy Hollow (August 1991, No. 24), Trace (September 1993, No. 11), Sold (February 1996, No. 29) Using My Gills as a Roadmap (June 1998) and Everydaydream (November 2000), before disbanding in mid-2002.

After Died Pretty, Peno formed The Darling Downs (2004), an alt.country collaboration with Kim Salmon., and released an experimental electronica album with Died Pretty songwriting partner, Brett Myers, under the title Noises and Other Voices (2006);

He later fronted Ron S. Peno & the Superstitions, releasing four studio albums: Future Universe (2011), Anywhere and Everything Is Bright (2013), Guiding Light (2017) and Do The Understanding (2021).

On 14 February 2019, it was announced that Peno had been diagnosed with esophageal cancer and that all upcoming Died Pretty shows would be cancelled while he underwent immediate treatment. A further message on the band's Instagram page stated that he "stands strong to beat it."

In August 2019, Peno successfully completed chemotherapy, and the tumour in his oesophagus was surgically removed. Medical staff were confident that all the cancer had been removed from his body. In December, Died Pretty announced Australian concerts for April and May 2020.

After a five year battle, Peno succumbed to cancer on 11 August 2023, in the presence of his wife Charity and his son Zebadiah, at home in South Yarra, Melbourne. He was 68 years old.

== Awards and nominations ==
=== EG Awards / Music Victoria Awards ===
The EG Awards (known as Music Victoria Awards since 2013) are an annual awards night celebrating Victorian music. They commenced in 2006.

| Year | Nominee / work | Award | Result |
|---|---|---|---|
| 2012 | Ron Peno | Best Male | Nominated |
