= Tactics (band) =

- Origin: Canberra, Australian Capital Territory, Australia
- Genres: Post-punk; art punk; new wave
- Years active: 1977–1989
- Labels: Green; Folding Chair; Regular/Festival; PolyGram
- Past members: Angus Douglas; Steve Kilbey; David Studdert; Robert Whittle; Steve Ball; Geoff Marsh; Ingrid Spielman; Garry Manley; Michael Farmer; Duncan McKenzie; Nicky Baruch; Tony Donohue; David "Snajik" Miller

Tactics are a post-punk group which formed in Canberra in 1977. The line-up changed periodically, with songwriter and vocalist, David Studdert, as the mainstay. They released four studio albums, My Houdini (December 1980), Glebe (November 1981), Blue and White Future Whale (1986) and The Great Gusto (1990). Which were critically acclaimed and they were respected for the quality of their live performances. However, they did not achieve wider commercial success and remained largely unacknowledged outside of the alternative independent music scene. Their reputation for running against the grain musically, lyrically, and stylistically was described by Bob Blunt as "frenetic, discordant, [and] full of unusual rhythms." Tactics disbanded late in 1989 and Studdert relocated to London. Since then, Tactics have played in Sydney 2006, 2008 and 2019). David Studdert has played periodically with ex-Tactics members in other projects.

== History ==
=== Formation and early years ===
Tactics were formed as a post-punk, pop group in 1977 in Canberra. An early line-up was Angus Douglas on lead guitar, Steve Kilbey (ex-Baby Grande) on bass guitar, Dave Studdert on lead vocals and rhythm guitar, and Robert Whittle on drums and percussion. Kilbey played "about four gigs" during his month long stint in the group before being asked to leave by Studdert. During 1978 Steve Ball became the bass player.

Studdert's inspirations included "Tom Verlaine (Television's vocalist and songwriter), as well as Arthur Lee (of Love), Dylan, Neil Young and the poet Rimbaud", which were "strong initial influence on his own songwriting style." He told The Canberra Times' Marie Ryan that "What I'm really aiming for with this band is our own identifiable sound. I want Tactics to sound like themselves in the way that Talking Heads sound like themselves, Love sound like themselves and Television sound like themselves." The band's "quirky, embryonic sound met with virtual indifference in Canberra."

In February 1979 Tactics relocated to Sydney at the invitation of fellow punk band, The Thought Criminals, which were pioneering alternative performance and recording opportunities there. Tactics worked at inner-city venues, such as French's, the Stage Door and the Civic, and began to build up a following. Prior to the shift Steve Ball had left. Geoff Marsh became the band's bass player and backing vocalist. According to Australian musicologist, Ian McFarlane, their early recordings – Long Weekend, a three-track extended play (June 1979) on the Folding Chair label, and a single, "Hole in My Life", on The Thought Criminals' Doublethink label (July 1980) – "suffered from poor sound quality and really only hinted at the band's potential."

In September 1979 they played a return gig in Canberra; Studdert reflected, "The crowd's reaction was tepid. In Sydney if an audience likes you, they won't hold back. People here are incredibly shy. Saturday was like a school social. I was surprised when people actually got up and danced." The Canberra Times' reviewer opined that "They play with energy, and power, but their interesting, poppy songs come across with a lightness that eludes most other new-wave bands. Their appearance at the Ainslie Rex, despite a few mix problems, was a demonstration of praiseworthy songwriting and sound musicianship." Before the end of 1979 Ingrid Spielman had joined the line-up on piano and keyboards.

=== 1980: My Houdini album ===
In December 1980 Tactics released their first album, My Houdini, via Green Records label, which McFarlane felt was "full of frantic energy, scratchy guitars, uneasy melodies, challenging songs and astute lyrical observations." It was co-produced by the group with Martin Bishop. Australian writer, Clinton Walker, recognised it as a definitive recording of that period:

My Houdini was a landmark Australian indy. It may hardly be remembered today, but that's probably because the sheer originality of Dave Studdert’s vision – and the shrillness of his voice – still asks too much of an audience.

My Houdini featured a wider range of instrumentation than the band’s live sound, with Spielman playing piano on the recording; additionally saxophones and flutes by Danny Field were used for some tracks. The album included a re-worked version "Buried Country" from Long Weekend, as well as some slower, more reflective songs "The Usual", "Frozen Park" and "A Settler's Complaint", which were not usually played in the band's live set.

Patrick Emery of I-94 Bar interviewed Studdert in October 2006 and asked about working on the album with Bishop, the vocalist recalled, "We were a pretty full-on and intense band. I was incredibly focused, and so were the other guys. He [Bishop] put us in a situation where we had to watch what he was doing, every five minutes, otherwise he'd do something we didn't want him to do ... we recorded during the day, played gigs at night and there was a lot of intensity and grinding poverty. So it was a pretty intense process. And he was a pretty intense guy too, but not necessarily in a positive way."

=== 1981–1983: from Glebe to hiatus ===
In 1981 Marsh was replaced by Garry Manley on bass guitar. Tactics' second album, Glebe, was released in November 1981. McFarlane highlighted the "departures from the earlier sound, featuring a stronger reggae/dub influence." Studdert told Emery that "From a marketing point of view the record was a wrong move but while recognising that it was, I don't regret it for one moment. I love the album, and I'm really happy that we did it and I know the reasons why we did a record that was so different to My Houdini. We weren't thinking in those terms about marketing, and we never had."

There were more line-up changes in 1982 with Studdert, Douglas and Manley joined by Michael Farmer on drums and Duncan McKenzie on keyboards. A live album, The Bones of Barry Harrison, was released in August 1982, which included live recordings from 1979 to 1982. However, McFarlane felt "the overall effect was lessened due to the low-fi sound on offer." During 1983 Dave Studdert broke up the band.

=== 1984–1989: from return to The Great Gusto ===
A year-and-a-half after the band broke up Tactics were re-formed in 1984 in Sydney by Studdert and Douglas with Nicky Baruch on vocals, keyboards, percussion and flute; Tony Donohue (ex-Same) on drums and David "Snajik" Miller on bass guitar. A single, "Fat Man", was released in July 1985 on Waterfront Records.

Their third studio album, Blue and White Future Whale, was released in November 1986. It was a departure from Tactics' earlier recordings, lacking "the frantic staccato rhythm that drives the band's earlier work."

In 1989 Tactics entered the studio to record their fourth studio album, The Great Gusto. The line-up comprised Studdert, Snajik, Garry Manley on guitar and piano, and Malcolm MacCallum on drums and keyboards. Added instrumental colour was provided by trumpeter Robert Weaver and Amanda Brown (ex-the Go-Betweens) on violin. The Great Gusto was released in November 1989. It was an ambitious release and closer to the mainstream than their previous albums, but once again sales were disappointing. Tactics disbanded in late 1989 as Dave Studdert departed for the United Kingdom.

=== Now Tactics, Post-Tactics, and retrospective releases ===
In late 1989, three days after The Great Gusto was mixed, Studdert left Australia for the UK at the invitation of English independent label Red Flame. He played with a number of bands in London before forming the eight-member band Mumbo Jumbo, which released recordings in the mid-1990s. In late 1996 Mumbo Jumbo undertook a brief tour in Australia which coincided with the release of a Tactics anthology The History of the Sky.

In 1999 Dave Studdert, Garry Manley and Lex Robertson formed the nucleus of a band called The Inside Up which toured Australia in 2000-1. The members of The Inside Up dispersed in 2003.

In late 2006 Memorandum Recordings released a double-CD anthology of Tactics' first two albums (My Houdini and Glebe) as well as some live recordings and unreleased songs from that period. All the tracks were re-mastered for the release, and the Glebe album was completely remixed from the original multi-track masters. Just prior to CD release Tactics reformed for two gigs; the line-up was Dave Studdert, Garry Manley and Ingrid Spielman, with the addition of Matt Galvin (guitar), Nic Cecire (drums), Lex Robertson (keyboards) and Pete Kelly (trumpet).

In March 2008 Memorandum Recordings released the second volume of The Sound of the Sound. The double CD anthology includes a re-mastered Blue and White Future Whale. The subsequent album, The Great Gusto, is represented in this collection by live versions and studio outtakes (an indication of Studdert’s dissatisfaction with the album). The band briefly reformed to publicise the CD release, and recorded five new songs in April 2008.

August 2019 saw the band perform their High Speed Picnic Tour, playing in Sydney, Brisbane and Melbourne, with a new album under their wing Early Shift at Charles de Gaulle (released on Scenic View Records). The live band (and current album studio band) comprise David Studdert – vocals, rhythm guitar and production, Ingrid Spielman – piano and organ, Garry Manley – bass, Nic Cecire – drums and percussion, Lex Robertson – backing vocals and assorted other instruments, and Wayne Connolly – lead guitar and production. On the new album are added Peter Fenton – backing vocals, and Matt Galvin – guitar (all solos except on Who Tells Me). French musician Jili Serra played with the live and studio band – guitar, e-bow, harmonica, bass.

== Members ==
- David Studdert - Lead vocals & rhythm guitar (all albums) - 1977-2019.
- Angus Douglas - Lead guitar (My Houdini, Glebe, The Bones...) - 1977-84.
- Robert Whittle - Drums, vocals (My Houdini, Glebe, The Bones...) - 1977-82.
- Geoff Marsh - Bass, vocals (My Houdini, The Bones...) - 1979-81.
- Ingrid Spielman - Piano (My Houdini, Glebe, The Bones..., Early Shift at Charles de Gaulle) - 1980-82 (recording sessions); Sept 2006, March 2008 and August 2019 (live band).
- Garry Manley - Bass & guitar (Glebe, The Bones..., The Great Gusto, Early Shift at Charles de Gaulle) - 1981-83 (bass); 1989-90 (guitar); Sept 2006, March 2008 & August 2019 (bass in live band).
- Duncan MacKenzie - organ - 1982.
- Michael Farmer - drums - 1982.
- Nicky Baruch - Vocals, keyboards, percussion, flute (Glebe, Blue & White Future Whale) - 1982-86.
- David 'Snajik' Miller - Bass (Blue & White Future Whale, The Great Gusto) - 1984-86; 1989-90.
- Tony Donohoe - Drums (Blue & White Future Whale) - 1984-86.
- Michael Sherman - Trumpet (Fatman, Committee of Love singles) - 1986.
- Lex Robertson - Keyboard (Early Shift at Charles de Gaulle) - 1989-90; Sept 2006, March 2008 & August 2019 (live band).
- Pete Kelly - Trumpet - 1989-90; Sept 2006 & March 2008 (live band).
- Adam 'Sloth' Burrell - Trumpet - 1989-90.
- Robbie Weaver - Trumpet (The Great Gusto) - 1988-1989.
- Nic Cecire - Drums (Early Shift at Charles de Gaulle) - Sept 2006, March 2008 & August 2019 (live band).
- Matt Galvin - Guitar (Early Shift at Charles de Gaulle) - Sept 2006 & March 2008 (live band).
- Wayne Connolly - Guitar (Early Shift at Charles de Gaulle) - August 2019 (live band).
- Jili Serra - Guitar, harmonica, bass - August 2018 (Tactics live band in France); Sydney, August 2019 (live band).
- Geoffrey Datson - Guitar (Tactics live band in France), August 2018.
- others along the way: Hamish Reid (bass) & Errol Gooding (sax).

== Discography ==
=== Studio albums ===
Title	Details
My Houdini	Released: February 1980; Label: Green / Larrikin (LRG-064); Format: LP
Glebe	Released: November 1981; Label: Green / Larrikin (LRG-094); Format: LP, Cassette
Blue and White Future Whale	Released: November 1986; Label: Citadel (FCR004); Format: LP, Cassette
The Great Gusto	Released: November 1989; Label: Mushroom Records (D-30161); Format: LP, Cassette
Early Shift at Charles de Gaulle	Released: 2019; Label: Scenic Drive; Format: CD, streaming, download

=== Live albums ===
Title	Details
The Bones of Barry Harrison	Released: August 1982; Label: Larrikin (LRF-113); Format: LP; Recorded across Australia 1979-1981

=== Compilations ===
Title	Details
History of the Sky	Released: 1996; Label: Tactics (TACTICS 1); Format: CD
The Sound of the Sound Vol. 1: My Houdini, Glebe & More	Released: October 2006; Label: Memorandum (MEMO2); Format: 2×CD
The Sound of the Sound Vol. 2: 1984 - 1988	Released: 2008; Label: Memorandum (MEMO4); Format: 2×CD

=== Extended PLays ===
Title	Details
Long Weekend	Released: August 1982; Label: Folding Chair Records (PRS-2653); Format: 7" LP
