= Free Dirt =

Studio album by Died Pretty
- Released: August 1986
- Recorded: November 1985
- Studio: Trafalgar Studios, Sydney
- Genre: Alternative rock, Aussie rock
- Length: 47:48
- Label: Citadel, What Goes On
- Producer: Rob Younger

Died Pretty chronology
Free Dirt (1986)	Pre-Deity (1988)

Singles from Free Dirt
- 1. "Stoneage Cinderella" Released: 1986; 2. "Blue Sky Day" Released: 1986

Professional ratings
Review scores
Source	Rating
AllMusic	4.5/5 stars

Free Dirt is the first full-length album by Australian alternative rock band Died Pretty, released in 1986. The album was repackaged in 2008 by Aztec Music with a second CD containing seven singles and six live recordings from 1986.

== Critical reception ==
Trouser Press wrote: "The highly recommended album — which contains glimmers of the ’60s, Dylan, Gram Parsons, folk-rock and neo-psychedelic — uses guest contributions of mandolin, violin, pedal steel and sax to magnify the band’s own essential variety."

== Track listing ==
All songs written by Brett Myers and Ron Peno, except where noted.

1. "Life to Go (Landsakes)" – 5:31
2. "Just Skin" (Myers) – 6:37
3. "The 2000 Year Old Murder" – 4:31
4. "Next to Nothing" – 6:47
5. "Blue Sky Day" – 3:29
6. "Round and Round" – 2:41
7. "Wig-Out" – 3:06
8. "Laughing Boy" – 3:34
9. "Through Another Door" (Myers) – 3:17
10. "Stoneage Cinderella" (Atkinson, Myers, Peno) – 3:19

1992 re-release bonus track

11. "Yesterday's Letters" (Myers) – 4:56

== Personnel ==
- Frank Brunetti – keyboards
- Tim Fagan – saxophone
- Graham Lee – pedal steel
- Mark Lock – bass
- Brett Myers – guitar, vocals
- John Papanis – mandolin
- Ron S. Peno – vocals
- Louis Tillett – piano
- Julian Watchhorn – violin
- Chris Welsh – percussion, drums
