= The Screaming Tribesmen =

Australian rock band

- Origin: Brisbane, Queensland, Australia
- Genres: Punk rock; indie rock; garage rock; hard rock
- Years active: 1981–1998; 2011–2012
- Labels: Citadel; Rattlesnake; Survival; Grown Up Wrong
- Past members: see Members

The Screaming Tribesmen were an Australian rock band formed in Brisbane, Queensland in 1981 by mainstay Mick Medew on lead vocals and lead guitar. With various line-ups they released three studio albums, Bones and Flowers (October 1987), Blood Lust (1990) and Formaldehyde (1993), before disbanding in 1998. They reformed in 2011 for performances until June 2012. Australian musicologist, Ian McFarlane, described how they, "fashioned a memorable brand of 1960s-inspired pop rock that combined equal parts existential lyric angst, melodic inventiveness and strident guitar riffs."

== History ==
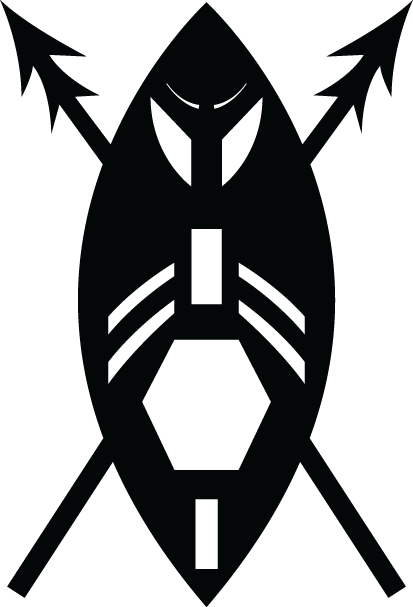
Logo

The Screaming Tribesmen were formed in Brisbane in 1981 by mainstay Mick Medew on lead vocals and lead guitar, (ex-31st), with John Hartley on bass guitar and Murray Shepherd on drums (both ex-the Fun Things). They had met when their bands performed on the same bill at local venues. The Screaming Tribesmen developed "a grassroots following" and their early material included the 31st's tracks, "Igloo" and "A Stand Alone", which had been co-written by Medew and Ron Peno.

Peno explained writing his lyrics, "['Igloo'] actually came from me reading Franz Kafka's Metamorphosis. It was me talking about an igloo being all white and positive, the Shoeshine Boys being negative... I dunno, one of those silly things I was going through when I was very young." Peno felt the early line-up of the Screaming Tribesmen, "didn't work out", and left in 1981 to join another local group, the End.

The Screaming Tribesmen's debut four-track extended play, Screaming Tribesman, appeared on EMI's Custom Records label in early 1982. Steve Gardner of Divine Rites described how its, "production has a rough and ready punk style and the songs vary from the 60's R&B of 'Turn on Your Love Light' to the fairly straight punk of 'Trans 43'. It was followed by a second four-track EP, I Don't Wanna Know, in 1983. Their first two singles, "Igloo" (October 1983) and "A Stand Alone" (November 1984) were produced by Chris Masuak via Citadel Records. By the end of 1983 Medew had relocated the band to Sydney, with Hartley and Shepherd returning to Brisbane early in the following year.

Medew formed a new line-up in July 1984 with Masuak (ex-Radio Birdman, the Hitmen) on guitar, piano and backing vocals; Mark Kingsmill on drums and Tony Robertson (both ex-the Hitmen, New Christs) on bass guitar. Kingsmill left to join Hoodoo Gurus a month later, Chris Welch played a few shows & left to join Died Pretty replaced by Michael Charles on drums, and Robertson left on the same day as Chris Welch was replaced by Bob Wackley on bass guitar (a.k.a. Bob Hood, ex-Razar, Grooveyard) in November. In September 1985 they issued their next four-track EP, Date with a Vampyre, also produced by Masuak. Gardner observed, "[the] title track of this record features a crunching riff that hooks hard over the top of a stuttering drumbeat and is one of the great songs of the mid 80s. The other 3 tracks aren't quite as strong, but the overall effect is good enough to make this record one of the indisposable classics of the period." Warwick Fraser (ex-Feather, Hoi Polloi) replaced Charles in 1986 on drums.

Their next EP, Top of the Town, had six tracks; it was released in September 1986 on the boutique, Rattlesnake Records label, which was co-produced by Masuak with Alan Thorne. Ian McFarlane, an Australian musicologist described it as, "a more lightweight guitar-pop sound, and failed to live up to expectations." In January 1987 they toured eastern Australia before starting to record their first full-length album in the following month, Bones and Flowers (October 1987), with Masuak and Thorne co-producing. The title, "referred to the mix in the band's music – between loud, hard-edged rock, and 'pretty songs'." McFarlane felt they had "returned to their hard rock roots."

Bones and Flowers provided two singles, "I've Got a Feeling" (September 1987) and "Casualty of Love" (March 1988). The band toured the United States in support of the album, while at home they had a run of Alternative hits. In the US their work had regular airplay on the College Radio circuit. Their first music video, "I've Got a Feeling", featured on US MTV's 120 Minutes. It reached No. 1 on the KROQ charts in Los Angeles and No. 7 on Billboard's Modern Rock chart. Gardner felt, "you are likely to have been put off by the arena-rock treatment they give the song, but if you listen closely, you can hear the usual brilliant guitar line basis that the [group] use for most of their best songs."

In April 1989 Fraser, Masuak and Wackley all left the group. Medew formed a new line-up with members of Melbourne band, Radio Luxembourg, Jeff Silver on bass guitar and Ritchie Hine on drums and former Kings of the Sun guitarist, Glenn Morris. This line-up released a five-track, EP, Take Cover, with cover versions in late 1989. The group's second album, Blood Lust, appeared in March 1991. McFarlane observed, "[it] included a couple of the band's heaviest ever songs like 'High Priestess', 'Frozen Tracks', 'Something Dangerous' and 'Queen of the Night Time World'."

Morris departed and was briefly replaced by Brian Mann on guitar, during 1989 and 1990, who was replaced in turn by Ash Geary before Morris returned at the end of 1992. In late 1991 Hine was replaced by Celibate Rifles' Paul Larsen on drums. The group released another album, Formaldehyde (July 1993), co-produced by Rob Younger, the Screaming Tribesmen and Mike Wood. Tony Cardinal (ex-Candy Harlots) replaced Larsen on drums.

Medew continued to tour, write and record with various line-ups. He resumed performing as Mick Medew and the Rumours featuring ex-the Screaming Tribesmen and Lost Boys, Chris Dixon and Ash Geary, with bass player, Paul Hawker. In 1997 the Screaming Tribesmen were reformed by Medew with Cardinal and Andy Newman on bass guitar and keyboards (ex-Trans 262, Rattlesnake Shake, Manifestations). McFarlane noted that they, "fashioned a memorable brand of 1960s-inspired pop rock that combined equal parts existential lyric angst, melodic inventiveness and strident guitar riffs." Adrian Cunningham determined, "Unfortunately, as time went on the band descended into b-grade hard rock and denim clichés. But they will be forever lionised for the cavernous guitar and haunting melody and lyrics of 'Igloo'."

In January 2011 Medew performed a set of the Screaming Tribesmen songs in Sydney with former guitarist and song writing partner, Masuak. In September of that year, the line-up of Fraser, Masuak, Medew and Wackley reformed for a series of shows on the Australian east coast beginning with the Gathering Festival, Brisbane. They subsequently performed in Melbourne and Sydney, on the back of CD re-issues, Date with a Vampyre / Top of the Town and Bones and Flowers via Australian label, Grown Up Wrong. The band played at the Azkena Rock Festival in Spain and toured France throughout June 2012 and disbanded soon after.

== Members ==
- Mick Medew – guitars, lead vocals (1981–96, 2011–12)
- John Hartley – bass (1981–84)
- Murray Shepherd – drums, backing vocals (1981–84)
- Ron Peno – vocals (1981)
- Mark Kingsmill – drums (1984)
- Tony Robertson – bass (1984)
- Chris Welsh – drums (1984)
- Michael Charles – drums (1984–86)
- Chris Masuak – guitars, keyboards, backing vocals (1984–89, 2011–12)
- Bob Wackley – bass (1984–89, 2011–12)
- Warwick Fraser – drums (1986–89, 2011–12)
- Ritchie Hine – drums, percussion, backing vocals (1989–92)
- Glenn Morris – guitar (1989, 1992–95)
- Jeff Silver – bass guitar (1989–96)
- Brian Mann – guitar (1989–90)
- Paul Larsen – drums, percussion, backing vocals (1991–93)
- Ash Geary – guitars (1992)
- Chris Dixon – drums (1993)
- Tony Cardinal – drums (1993–98)
- Marc Dé Hugar – guitars (1995) (died January 2022)
- Andy Newman – bass, keyboards (1996–98)

== Discography ==
=== Studio albums ===
List of albums, with Australian chart positions
Title	Album details	Peak chart positions
Title	Album details	AUS
Bones and Flowers	Released: October 1987; Format: LP, CD, Cassette; Label: Survival Records (460120 2)	84
Blood Lust	Released: 1990; Format: LP, CD, Cassette; Label: Survival Records (468008 2)	-
Formaldehyde	Released: 1993; Format: LP, CD, Cassette; Label: Survival Records (SUR527 CD)	-

=== Compilation albums ===
Title	Album details
High Time: A Collection	Released: 1990 (Europe); Format: CD, Cassette; Label: Rattlesnake (SUR507 CD)
Anthology 1982–1993: All Hail the Tribesmen	Released: 2003; Format: CD; Label: Raven Records (RVCD-169)
The Savage Beat of the Screaming Tribesmen	Released: December 2003; Format: CD; Label: Savage/Shock Records (Savage002)

=== Extended plays ===
Title	EP details
Screaming Tribesmen	Released: 1982; Format: LP, Cassette; Label: EMI
I Don't Wanna Know	Released: 1982; Format: LP, Cassette; Label: EMI (13349)
Date with a Vampyre	Released: September 1985; Format: LP, Cassette; Label: Citadel (CITEP902)
Top of the Town	Released: 1986; Format: LP, Cassette; Label: Rattlesnake (RAT1202)
Take Cover	Released: 1989; Format: LP, Cassette, CD; Label: Survival (655147-6)

=== Singles ===
Year	Title	Chart positions	Album
Year	Title	US Modern Rock	Album
1983	"Igloo"	–	—N/a
1984	"A Stand Alone"	–	—N/a
1987	"Casualty of Love"	–	Bones and Flowers
1988	"I've Got a Feeling"	7	Bones and Flowers
1988	"Casualty of Love"	–	Bones and Flowers
1991	"Ayla"	–	Blood Lust
1992	"Got You On My Mind"	–	Formaldehyde
