= Died Pretty =

Australian alternative rock band

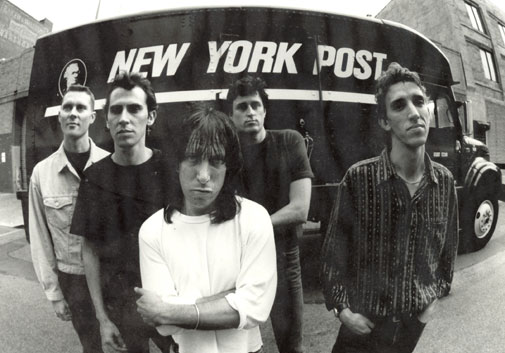
- Died Pretty circa 1990: (L-R) John Hoey, Chris Welsh, Ron S. Peno, Brett Myers, Steve Clark.

Background information
- Also known as: Final Solution
- Origin: Sydney, New South Wales, Australia
- Genre: Alternative rock
- Years active: 1983–2002, 2008–2009, 2012, 2016–2023
- Labels: Citadel, What Goes On, Closer, Blue Mosque, Festival, Sony/Columbia, RCA, Beggars Banquet
- Past members: See members list below
- Website: www.died-pretty.com

Died Pretty, sometimes The Died Pretty, were an Australian alternative rock band founded by mainstays Ron Peno (lead singer) and Brett Myers (lead guitarist and backing vocalist) in Sydney in 1983. Their music started from a base of early electric Bob Dylan with psychedelic influences, including The Velvet Underground and Television. They were managed by John Needham, who is the owner of Citadel Records, their main label.

Died Pretty's 1990s albums, Doughboy Hollow, Trace and Sold, appeared on the Australian Recording Industry Association (ARIA) Albums Charts but they had more success on the alternative scene. According to rock music historian Ian McFarlane they "unashamedly plundered rock's past to arrive at an original sound that was always passionate, atmospheric and uplifting ... produced some of the most inspirational rock music heard in Australia". The group formally disbanded in 2002 but the members reunited on a number of occasions for short tours in Australia. They undertook a joint national tour with Radio Birdman in June and July 2017.

== History ==
=== 1983–1989: Formation and early years ===
Died Pretty was formed in 1983 in Sydney. Peno had been a member of Sydney punk band The Hellcats (as Ronnie Pop, 1977), and followed with The 31st (in Brisbane, 1979–1981) and Screaming Tribesmen (Brisbane then Sydney, 1981–1983). In April 1983, music journalist and keyboardist Frank Brunetti of Super K had formed a duo with lead guitarist and vocalist Brett Myers from The End (in Brisbane then Sydney). Myers was a fan of American group Velvet Underground and the duo modelled themselves after experimental New York protopunk band Suicide. Brunetti suggested Peno join as singer and their first five performances were in Brisbane under the name Final Solution, after the song by Pere Ubu. Peno provided the name Died Pretty, and on drums, they recruited Rob Younger (Radio Birdman, Super K) for two months. After various bass guitarists, Jonathan Lickliter joined and Younger was replaced by Colin Barwick both from The End with Myers. Younger concentrated on his career as producer for Citadel Records. Died Pretty signed with Citadel and were managed by the label's owner John Needham. Their music started from a base of early electric Bob Dylan with psychedelic influences, including The Velvet Underground and Television. According to rock music historian, Ian McFarlane, they "unashamedly plundered rock's past to arrive at an original sound that was always passionate, atmospheric and uplifting ... produced some of the most inspirational rock music heard in Australia".

The band came to the attention of the Australian independent music scene and inner city circuit. In January 1984 they recorded "Out of the Unknown", with Younger producing, which was released on Citadel as their first single. Before touring to Melbourne, Lickliter was replaced on bass guitar by Mark Lock (The Phantom Agents, End). In August they recorded a 10-minute psychedelic epic "Mirror Blues" (issued split over a 7" in Australia and intact on 12" in the United Kingdom). Barwick was dissatisfied with Died Pretty and the band tried to recruit Chris Welsh (The 31st, Screaming Tribesmen) but initially could not finance a drum kit for him. With Welsh finally on board, they recorded the extended play (EP), Next to Nothing, released in August 1985. It held a top ten position on the alternative charts for nearly 12 months, starting their career with critical attention and three alternative chart No. 1 hits in a row. UK label, What Goes On, compiled their early singles as The Died Pretty on a three-track EP and French label Closer released Next to Nothing in 1985. Three releases achieved 'Single of the Week' in UK music weekly Melody Maker, though the band did not achieve a great deal of popularity or notice by the UK public. The next single "Stoneage Cinderella" was released in June 1986, taken from their first album Free Dirt, produced by Younger, which followed in August. Free Dirt was released internationally by What Goes On and Citadel. The band went on its first tour to Europe and the United States in October, which included two weeks in France with drummer Andrew Edge filling-in for Welsh, who had broken his foot in London. Died Pretty became a popular attraction in France and Italy.

The second album, Lost, was released in June 1988 on the Blue Mosque label, an offshoot of Citadel and major label Festival Records, and outside Australia through Beggars Banquet and Closer. It was the second highest selling alternative album for the year and peaked at No. 3 in Italy. Myers produced two albums for Citadel label mates Porcelain Bus. Lock departed after recording Lost but before its release – he had grown weary of touring – and was replaced on bass guitar by Steve Clark (The Glass, 30/40 Purple). Died Pretty undertook their second tour of US and Europe. Lost provided three singles – "Winterland", "Towers of Strength" and "Out of My Hands". Brunetti had left in April 1988 – his last recording, "Everybody Moves", was released as a single in 1989 – and was replaced by John Hoey, (The Thought Criminals, X-Men, New Christs) on keyboards. The band went on a third tour of Europe and US, but remained in Los Angeles at tour's end to prepare for their next album.

=== 1990–2002: Second phase ===
Died Pretty recorded their third album, Every Brilliant Eye, in Los Angeles with Jeff Eyrich (The Gun Club, The Plimsouls, The Blasters) producing. It was released on Blue Mosque in April 1990. The album featured a more polished production with leaner, more rock-oriented songs – it spawned the singles, "Whitlam Square" (February), "True Fools Fall" (May) and "Is There Anyone?".

Their fourth album, Doughboy Hollow, was released in August 1991 on Blue Mosque and Beggars Banquet, which peaked at No. 24 on the Australian Recording Industry Association (ARIA) Albums Chart. The album was "[b]rimming with passionate, dramatic and alluring musical vistas". It was produced by Englishman Hugh Jones (The Damned, Echo & the Bunnymen, Simple Minds). Its singles, "Stop Myself", "D.C." and "Sweetheart", despite being "near-perfect pop", did not achieve mainstream chart success. After recording the album, Brisbane bass guitarist Robert Warren replaced Clark. The band were nominated for two ARIA Awards in 1992. Welsh was replaced by a succession of drummers, Murray Shepherd (Screaming Tribesmen), Warwick Fraser (Screaming Tribesmen) and Stuart Eadie (Clouds) before he returned at year's end.

Reuniting with producer Hugh Jones, their next album, Trace was released worldwide by Sony Music in September 1993, and became their biggest-selling album to date, peaking at No. 11 on the ARIA Albums Chart. It spun off four singles and videos, "Caressing Swine", "Harness Up", "Headaround" and "A State of Graceful Mourning'. The video for "A State of Graceful Mourning" was filmed in a forest that had been burned out by the 1994 Eastern seaboard fires. Soon after the release of Trace, long-time drummer Welsh left and became an English teacher in Thailand. A CD-EP, Days was issued late in 1994 with Nick Kennedy (Big Heavy Stuff) on drums. They supported R.E.M., at that band's request, on the Australian leg of their Monster Tour, in early 1995.

Their next album, Sold, released in February 1996, was recorded with contributions by two drummers - Kennedy had been replaced by Shane Melder (on loan from Sidewinder). Sold reunited them with original producer Younger, who co-produced with Wayne Connolly. It was also mixed at the well-known Fort Apache Studios in Boston by Paul Kolderie and Sean Slade (Buffalo Tom, Radiohead, Dinosaur Jr). A rougher, harder-sounding collection than Doughboy or Trace, it gained critical acclaim and reached the Top 30. Its singles "Cuttin' Up Her Legs" and "Good at Love" failed to chart and Died Pretty were dropped by Sony in April 1996. Simon Cox (Juice) joined on as full-time drummer in May and the group signed back with Citadel, and released a four-track EP, Deeper in November. The EP has a guest appearance by Hoodoo Gurus guitarist Brad Shepherd and has Peno playing harmonica on the opening track "You Need Wings". The EP was produced by Connolly, who had become the band's producer of choice and would work on all their subsequent studio output.

Their last two studio albums, Using My Gills As a Roadmap (1998) and Everydaydream (2000) showed the band moving away from basic guitar rock and making greater use of electronics, citing Kraftwerk, David Bowie's Low and obscure Euro dance records as influences. They released a compilation, Out of the Unknown – The Best of Died Pretty (1999), on Citadel.

Bass guitarist Warren departed the band temporarily in December 2001 due to tinnitus. Myers and Peno – the band's main songwriters – began working on a proposed new album, but this proved difficult as Peno had moved to Melbourne. In May 2002, Died Pretty announced they would disband after a final Australian tour with Warren back on board. They released a three-track 'farewell' single, "My Generation Landslide" in August.

=== 2002–2023: Later projects and reformations ===
Peno joined with guitarist and vocalist Kim Salmon (The Scientists, Beasts of Bourbon) in 2005 to form country music group, Darling Downs. They recorded two albums, How Can I Forget This Heart of Mine? (2005) and From One to Another (2007). In 2007, Peno and Myers recorded an independently released album as Noises and Other Voices. It included material originally written for Died Pretty's unrecorded final album, along with some newly written songs. Peno and Myers played occasional 'Songs of Died Pretty Unplugged' shows in Brisbane, Sydney and Melbourne, including the Queenscliff music festival.

In February 2008, Died Pretty re-formed to perform Doughboy Hollow in its entirety as part of the All Tomorrow's Parties-curated Don't Look Back series, using that album's line-up – Clark, Hoey, Myers, Peno and Welsh – playing together for the first time in sixteen years. Peno revealed that a documentary was pending – featuring interviews with band members, and rehearsal and concert footage from the Melbourne shows. Doughboy Hollow was remastered, expanded and reissued by Citadel Records in February. The tour included shows in all major capital cities. The line-up continued with appearances at the 2008 Homebake Festival in Sydney and EG Awards Hall of Fame inductees on 4 December in Melbourne. They appeared on the nationwide Big Day Out tour in January 2009, having played the inaugural Big Day Out back in 1992. A 2×CD deluxe reissue of their debut album Free Dirt was released through Aztec Music in late 2008, and an expanded reissue of 1988's Lost was released in June 2013. Peno & Myers performed an acoustic set at the Orient Hotel, Brisbane, on 7 November 2009 for a private party. Peno had returned to his solo career by May 2010. In October 2010, Doughboy Hollow (1991) was listed in the book, 100 Best Australian Albums.

In April 2012, Died Pretty performed as part of the Dig It Up! series of concerts around Australia, organised to celebrate 30 years of recorded music by fellow Australian band Hoodoo Gurus.

In March 2016, the band played across Australia as part of the 'A Day on the Green' concert series, with Hoodoo Gurus, Sunnyboys, Violent Femmes and Ratcat. They also played some headline shows in clubs.

The band undertook a joint national tour with Radio Birdman in June and July 2017.

On 14 February 2019, it was announced that Ron Peno had been diagnosed with oesophageal cancer and that all upcoming Died Pretty shows would be cancelled while he underwent immediate treatment. A further message on the band's Instagram page stated that he "stands strong to beat it."

In August 2019, Peno successfully completed chemotherapy, and the tumour in his oesophagus was surgically removed. Medical staff are confident that all the cancer has been removed from his body. In December, Died Pretty announced Australian concerts for April and May 2020.

The band officially returned to the stage with a performance at the Factory Theatre in Sydney on 17 April 2021.

The band released a double live album, simply titled Live, on 24 March 2023. The album was recorded during a show at Melbourne's Forum Theatre in 2008, when the band reformed to play a series of gigs across Australia to celebrate Doughboy Hollow as part of the Don't Look Back concert series.

The band had intended to return to the stage for a live tour in October 2023; this was cancelled in July, however, due to both Peno and Welsh battling different forms of cancer. Peno died on 10 August 2023, at the age of 68. Long-time drummer Chris Welsh died on 8 October 2026, at the age of 64, after a multi-year cancer battle.

== Personnel ==
Final line-up

- Brett Myers – guitar, backing and occasional lead vocals (1983–2002, 2008–2009, 2012, 2016–2023)
- Ronald S. Peno – lead vocals (1983–2002, 2008–2009, 2012, 2016–2023; died 2023)
- Chris Welsh – drums, percussion (1985–1992, 1993–1995, 2008–2009, 2012, 2016–2023; died 2026)
- Dr Steve Clark – bass guitar (1988–1991, 2008–2009, 2012, 2016–2023)
- John Hoey – keyboards (1988–2002, 2008–2009, 2012, 2016–2023)

Former members

- Frank Brunetti – keyboards (1983–1988)
- Rob Younger – drums (1983)
- Colin Barwick – drums (1983–1985)
- Jonathan Lickliter – bass guitar (1983–1984)
- Mark Lock – bass guitar (1984–1988)
- Robert Warren – bass guitar, backing vocals (1991–2002)
- Murray Shepherd – drums (1992)
- Warwick Fraser – drums (1992)
- Stuart Eadie – drums (1992–1993)
- Nick Kennedy – drums (1995)
- Shane Melder – drums (1995)
- Simon Cox – drums (1996–2002)

== Timeline ==
Additional musicians

- Louis Tillett – piano
- Graham Lee – pedal steel guitar
- John Papanis – mandolin
- Julian Watchhorn – violin
- Tim Fagan – saxophone
- Astrid Munday – backing vocals
- Don Walker – piano
- J'Anna Jacobi – violin
- Shandra Beri – backing vocals
- Gary McLaughlin – percussion
- Gonzalo Quintana III – drums
- Amanda Brown – violin
- Sarah Peet – cello
- Sunil de Silva – percussion
- Eleanor Rodgers – harmonies
- Caroline Lavelle – cello
- Jack Howard – trumpet

== Discography ==
=== Studio albums ===
List of albums, with Australian chart positions
Title	Album details	Peak chart positions
Title	Album details	AUS
Free Dirt	Released: August 1986; Label: Citadel (CITLP 504); Format: CD, LP, cassette	185
Lost	Released: June 1988; Label: Blue Mosque (L 38924); Format: CD, LP, cassette	–
Every Brilliant Eye	Released: March 1990; Label: Blue Mosque, Festival Records (L 30270); Format: CD, LP, cassette	79
Doughboy Hollow	Released: April 1991; Label: Blue Mosque, Festival Records (D 30578); Format: CD, LP, cassette	24
Trace	Released: September 1993; Label: Columbia (474643 4); Format: CD, cassette	11
Sold	Released: February 1996; Label: Columbia (481668.2); Format: CD, cassette	29
Using My Gills as a Roadmap	Released: 1998; Label: Citadel (CITCD 536); Format: CD	–
Everydaydream	Released: 2000; Label: Citadel (CITCD 548); Format: CD	–

=== Live albums ===
List of live albums with Australian details
Title	Compilation details
Live Died Pretty	Released: 2023; Label: Citadel (CITLP704); Format: 2xLP, CD; Recorded in Melbourne in 2008

=== Compilation albums ===
List of albums with Australian details
Title	Compilation details
Pre-Deity	Released: 1987; Label: Citadel (CITLP510); Format: LP
Out of the Unknown – The Best of Died Pretty	Released: 1998; Label: Larrikin (CITCD547); Format: 2xCD
Something We Left Behind	Released: 2016; Label: Three Twelve Productions – (c1601212); Format: CD, digital download; Note: 18 b-sides and non-album tracks

=== Extended plays ===
List of Extended plays, with Australian chart positions
Title	Album details	Peak chart positions
Title	Album details	AUS
Next To Nothing	Released: August 1985; Label: Citadel (CITEP 901); Format: LP, Cassette	–
Days	Released: January 1995; Label: Columbia (661140 2); Format: CD, Cassette	69
Deeper	Released: October 1996; Label: Citadel (CITEP 916); Format: CD, Cassette	–

=== Singles ===
Year	Single	Peak chart positions	Album
Year	Single	AUS	Album
1984	"Out of the Unknown"	–	non-album singles
1984	"Mirror Blues"	–	non-album singles
1985	"Final Twist"	–	Next to Nothing
1986	"Stoneage Cinderella"	–	Free Dirt
1986	"Blue Sky Day"	–	Free Dirt
1987	"Winterland"	–	Lost
1988	"Towers of Strength"	–	Lost
1988	"Out of My Hands"	–	Lost
1989	"Everybody Moves"	154	non-album single
1990	"Whitlam Square"	155	Every Brilliant Eye
1990	"True Fools Fall"	–	Every Brilliant Eye
1991	"Stop Myself"	163	Doughboy Hollow
1991	"D.C."	124	Doughboy Hollow
1992	"Sweetheart"	129	Doughboy Hollow
1993	"Caressing Swine"	74	Trace
1993	"Harness Up"	35	Trace
1993	"Headaround"	96	Trace
1993	"A State of Graceful Mourning"	–	Trace
1995	"Cuttin' Up Her Legs"	–	Sold
1995	"Good at Love"	–	Sold
1997	"Radio"	–	Using My Gills As a Roadmap
1998	"Slide Song"	–	Using My Gills As a Roadmap
2000	"That Look Before"/"Misunderstood"	–	Everydaydream
2002	"My Generation Landslide"	–	non-album single

== Awards and nominations ==
=== ARIA Music Awards ===
The ARIA Music Awards is an annual awards ceremony that recognises excellence, innovation, and achievement across all genres of Australian music. They commenced in 1987.

Year	Nominee / work	Award	Result	Ref.
1989	Lost	Best New Talent	Nominated	
1989	Robyn Stacey & Richard Allan – Lost	Best Cover Art	Nominated	
1992	Doughboy Hollow	Album of the Year	Nominated	
1992	Marcel Lunam for Died Pretty – "D.C."	Best Video	Nominated	

=== The Age EG Awards ===
The Age EG Awards are an annual awards night celebrating Victorian music. They commenced in 2005.

Year	Nominee / work	Award	Result
2008	Died Pretty	Hall of Fame	inductee
