= Citadel Records =

Australian independent record label

Citadel Records is an independent record label from Sydney, Australia. It was established in the early 1980s by John Needham. Bands released through Citadel include Died Pretty, Deniz Tek, Kim Salmon and the Surrealists, The Trilobites, Porcelain Bus, Johnny Thunders & Patti Palladin, Harem Scarem, New Christs, Louis Tillett, The Bamboos, The Moffs, The Screaming Tribesmen, The Stems, The Plunderers, The Bam Balams, Sacred Cowboys, Dubrovniks, Lime Spiders, The Someloves, Lipstick Killers, Hard-Ons, The Barbarellas, Leadfinger and Dom Mariani.

== See also ==
- List of record labels
