= Brisbane punk rock =

History of punk rock in the Australian city

- Stylistic origins: Protopunk; surf rock; glam rock; rock and roll; garage rock
- Cultural origins: Mid-1970s, Brisbane, Australia
- Typical instruments: Electric guitar, bass guitar, drums, vocals

Other topics
- Australian punk rock: garage punk; hardcore punk; punk fashion; punk rock; skate punk; crossover thrash

Brisbane punk rock had its main impact between 1975 and 1984 as part of the overall punk rock scene in Australia. According to rock music historian, Ian McFarlane, the Queensland capital provided "some of the most anarchistic bands" of that era whilst it was "arguably the most conservative city" in the country. The development of the local punk movement differed from other cities because of its relative geographic isolation from other similar trends. The Brisbane scene also received a greater scrutiny by local police where early punk bands formed as "an obvious backlash to an oppressed society". This generated antagonistic and individualistic groups or "snot" driven punk bands.

The Brisbane punk rock movement can be divided into four phases. First, there was the pioneering chapter, which lasted from 1975 to 1977. These bands were either innovators or part of the first wave of local punk bands. Foremost of all such groups are the Saints, which are acknowledged as "Aussie punk pioneers". The second phase occurred between 1978 and 1980, which McFarlane described as "the second generation" of punk groups. The next period or "third-generation" spanned from 1981 to 1984 and diverged into two genres of punk rock and hardcore punk. The fourth period, during 1985 to 1988, developed three styles: Detroit rock (and the closely aligned garage punk), hardcore punk including Crossover thrash and skate punk – the Brisbane punk rock movement had changed to alternative rock.

== History ==
=== Pioneers (1975–77) ===
"For many bands Brisbane proved not to be the isolated haven in which they could polish their art, but a repressive, aggressive town, the very personification of the red neck deep South (of America)."

— Doug Hutson and Gavin Sawford, Out of the Unknown: Brisbane Bands 1976–1988, "Home Town Connection", p. 9.

Brisbane punk rock developed under the state government of Joh Bjelke-Petersen, the Premier of Queensland from 1968 to 1987; his administration was investigated by the Fitzgerald Inquiry (1987–89), which found "long-term, systemic political corruption and abuse of power." Bjelke-Petersen resigned, two of his ministers and the state's police commissioner were jailed for corruption charges. Doug Hutson and Gavin Sawford co-wrote in their book from 1988, Out of the Unknown: Brisbane Bands 1976-1988 that, "Authority's intolerance of anything different, which, to be fair has since considerably diminished, reflects the peculiar suspicious verging on animosity that Queenslanders as a whole hold for anyone who leaves the cultural straight and narrow of beer, beach and burgers."

Kid Galahad and the Eternals were a garage rock band formed in 1973 in Brisbane by school mates: Chris Bailey on lead vocals, Ivor Hay on piano and Ed Kuepper on guitar. Locally they earned a reputation for their punk attitude after a debut performance at a Returned and Services League venue in the western suburbs. Bailey described the first gig to a United Kingdom fanzine, Sniffin' Glue, in October 1976, "Then after our second drummer walked out and we almost called it 'quits' but we decided to keep playing to the 30 people (from an original 150 patrons) who were still with us. Before the last number the manager of the hall arrived with cops, turned off the power... The cops told us they would confiscate our equipment if we didn't go, so we went." By the end of 1975 the band added Kym Bradshaw on bass guitar and moved Hay to drums; soon after they changed their name to the Saints.

The Saints favourite rehearsal space was a shed behind Hay's home, which was near a police station; after the group were "ostracised" by the local music scene they established their own venue to perform their original material. Located at 4 Petrie Terrace, it was named Club 76. Kuepper later opined "we didn't play until we started putting on shows of our own, and then the cops would break them up anyway, as they did any sort of gathering." The Saints' debut single, (I'm) Stranded (September 1976), was issued on their own Fatal Records label. Copies were sent to local, national and international media and record labels. "(I'm) Stranded" came to the attention of the UK musical press and fitted neatly into the punk sound and attitude in London. Sounds magazine's Jonh Ingham declared it "Single of this and every week." Jon Savage, UK journalist and punk historian, later wrote that the Saints "had been developing in near isolation for three years, but it took just one review in Sounds magazine to make their career."

The Saints arrived in the UK in 1977 but found that their hair and image did not fit the UK punk dress codes. The locals were sporting spiky hair and brothel creepers, instead the group had appeared similar to street bums with attitude. Kuepper reflected on their reception, "By the time we got here the initial spirit already died out, it was very contrived. There were too many people following slavishly after. We had problems because we didn't look new wave." The Saints reached the UK charts with their third single, This Perfect Day (July 1977), after the Sex Pistols had released their second single, God Save the Queen (May).

The Saints released (I'm) Stranded (February 1977) and followed with Eternally Yours (May 1978), which included their single, Know Your Product (February). Australian musicologist, Ian McFarlane, declared that "Know Your Product" was "one of the greatest R&B-fuelled rock songs of all time." A third album, Prehistoric Sounds, was released in October before Kuepper left. Bailey formed a new line-up of the Saints in 1980; however, their punk edge was lost without "Ed Kuepper's relentless power chords." In May 2001 "(I'm) Stranded" was listed in Australian Performing Rights Association's Top 30 Australian songs of all time. (I'm) Stranded was listed at No. 20 in the book, 100 Best Australian Albums (October 2010), with Prehistoric Sounds at No. 41.

In 1976 the Leftovers were formed in Sandgate, as "Australia's first true punks in the Sex Pistols mould" according to music writer, Clinton Walker. Walker felt they were "obnoxious, anarchic, anti-social, powerful, violent and with a strong self-destructive bent." They gained local recognition for their existentialist approach. On Behind the Banana Curtain (2000, a CD compilation sponsored by the radio station, 4ZZZ) they were described as "Raw, intoxicated, energetic and antisocial." The Leftovers experienced "continuous harassment from the local constabulary"; and a history that included, a "story of prison, the shocking aftermath of attempted suicide and now-numerous deaths." In June 1979 they released their only single, Cigarettes and Alcohol, which McFarlane declared was "one of the classics of the late 1970s Australian punk rock era." They disbanded later that year.

Also from this period were the Survivors (formed in 1976 as Rat Salad), which issued a sole single, Baby Come Back, in December 1977. It was included on the Lethal Weapons (May 1978) compilation by various Australian punk bands. The Survivors' bassist, Jim Dickson, went on to play for profile bands that included The Barracudas and Radio Birdman. During this era Brisbane punk rock venues included the Hamilton Hall and Toowong RSL hall. Hutson and Sawford stated that "Two of the more notorious DIY venues were the Saint's 76 Club ... and the Baroona Road Hall, scene of numerous 'one-off' multiple band gigs."

From November 1975 4ZZZ broadcast local punk music; John Stanwell, its original Arts Administrator, explained, in September 2006, that it was "The first (Radio) station in the world to play The Saints." The era was documented in a fanzine SSuicide Alley, arguably Australia's second punk fanzine, which was printed in Brisbane in April 1977 by Walker and Andrew McMillan. Walker detailed the late 1970s Brisbane scene through his contemporary work for University of Queensland paper, Semper, and another fanzine, Pulp. His later books include Inner City Sound (1982) and Stranded: The Secret History of Australian Independent Music 1977–1991 (1996).

=== Second phase (1978–80) ===
The Brisbane punk movement expanded from 1978: the "second generation" of bands were formed. They were given air time on 4ZZZ and the station was influential in playing the new music during this period. One band, which benefited from such airplay, was Razar with their track, "Task Force (Undercover Cops)" (1978). Hutson and Sawford described them as a "Youthful and popular punk outfit which attracted a lot of attention due to their controversial material." The lyrics of "Task Force" dealt with the Queensland Police special branch, or "Brisbane's notorious undercover police."

Razar, and most high-profile Brisbane punk groups, received intense scrutiny from the local constabulary with their venues often raided and closed. 4ZZZ's Dave Darling, and an independent concert promoter, recalled: "We encountered problems with police just like everybody else did that tried to run a venue... 9 out of 10 of them I don't think ever made the final song... and [we would] disguise them from Task Force knowing they were on, but eventually in the course of the night one of them would find out and next thing you know you had all of them there..." Hutson and Sawford elucidated that, "In fact it wasn't uncommon for police, both uniformed and Special Branch plainclothes, to regularly break up concerts by bands such as Razar, the Leftovers and the Sharks, who were considered among the more subversive and threatening local talent."

The antithesis and disdain for other forms of contemporary popular music was a notable characteristic amongst Brisbane's punks. Razar's laconic anti disco song from their 1978 single Stamp out Disco A-side and the highly caustic song from 1984 about the New Romantics by the Vampire Lovers, titled Long Awaited Justice, were two clear recorded examples that reflected this negative attitude.

The Fun Things, originally known as The Aliens, were an outfit that characterised the Detroit sound inspired by Sydney-based punk group, Radio Birdman. Fun Things recorded a track, "When the Birdmen Fly", released on their self-titled EP. According to McFarlane, "The Fun Things issued what has emerged as one of the most collectable artefacts of the Australian punk rock era." The band members, John Hartley, Brad Shepherd and his brother, Murray Shepherd, went on to join other bands, including the Hoodoo Gurus for Brad and The Screaming Tribesmen for Hartley and Murray.

Zero, a feminist-styled punk band, (although some critics considered Zero to play a more quirky sort of pop, or New wave music) were present on the local scene. Their contributions were seen as "colourful and imaginative". Zero changed their name in the 1980s to Xero and released an EP in 1982. The line-up included John Willsteed and Lindy Morrison, who both went on to the Go Betweens.

Another youthful Brisbane punk band was the Young Identities. According to McFarlane, the band presented "plenty of youthful energy, belligerent spirit and all-important punk attitude. In the 1980s the band changed its name to Kicks and joined the rising Goth rock sound.

Other artists from this second phase included the 31st., the Alphabet Children, the Bodysnatchers, Flying Squad, Gerry Mander and the Boundaries, Just Urbain, the Leftovers, the Pits, Same 13, the Survivors, the Swell Guys, the Toy Watches, the Upsets. Fuller Banks & the Debentures, supported UK group the Stranglers at the Queens Hotel, other groups played spasmodically, generally at hall gigs. The Stranglers issued a single in October 1979, Nuclear Device (The Wizard of Aus), which focussed on Premier Bjelke-Petersen and his political style. It peaked at No. 36 in the UK singles chart.

Also during 1979 a track, "Sunset Strip", released by the Numbers (later renamed the Riptides), was a punk-like tune, which had regular 4ZZZ airplay. It was regarded by Stephen J. McParland as "punchy and energetic and featured a brilliant, English-flavoured 1960s-inspired pop sound."

Venues that hosted punk gigs, largely booked and promoted by 4ZZZ, during this second phase include Exchange Hotel, Queens Hotel, The Curry Shop, Baroona Hall and the Silver Dollar Disco. Rotten Import Records was a shop dedicated to punk music in 1978 and The Elizabeth Street Bar (nicknamed White Chairs) – a hang out for punk, new wave or alternative rockers from 1980 to 1987.

=== Third generation (1981–84) ===
This phase centered on the early to mid-1980s. The dark mood of the bands reflected the changing dynamics of punk. "As the restrictive measures of punk, and all the clichéd fashion statements it entailed, came to a close, post punk groups took up the gauntlet. These exciting new bands used the DIY spirit to launch a more introspective, even gloomy, but still vibrant sound." said Jason C. Reeher in his review of Post Punk. Many of the Brisbane bands absorbed the darker edge due to the post-punk fashion; however, several of these newer groups continued on the same snotty punk path that was distinctive to Brisbane.

The assertion that “During the 1980s, a “punk panic” emerged that positioned punk as a dire threat to public order. Punks were cast as nihilistic, destructive, and dangerous villains” applied to a significant proportion of the attitudes within Brisbane's mainstream society. Nevertheless, as 1984 progressed, the perceived “scary” aspects of punk by Brisbane's general public faded. The people in the community that harbored either resentment, revulsion and/or hostility became more tolerant towards the local punks. This led to the local scene losing its power of negative reaction forever to time. However, punk rock in Brisbane still was not seen as a “celebrated subculture” until much later, when it was distorted through the lens of revivalist punk bands from the 1990s onwards. During 1984, an extinction event happened simultaneously around Australia that saw other prevalent rock subcultures peter out by the end of the year. The Sharpies movement in Melbourne and the Australian Rocker movement in Adelaide, just like Brisbane's punk rock scene, they also faded from view.

Zits, a punk venue in the Fortitude Valley during 1982, was instrumental for putting on the early appearances of last wave punk groups such as Mystery of Sixes (mix of punk, hardcore punk and death rock influenced by The Stranglers and Bauhaus), Vampire Lovers (Radio Birdman – The Damned style of punk), and Public Execution (Black Flag inspired). After the closure of another punk venue in 1984, The Aussie Nash (at the Australian National Hotel) there was a general decline in punk band numbers participating in the local scene.

The Mystery of Sixes self-titled song, "Mystery of Sixes", received substantial airplay on 4ZZZ. Jello Biafra, (Dead Kennedys) reviewed their EP's songs as such, "this Brisbane band is a little more on the post-punk side. They definitely live in their own world, especially when the Arabic – style vocals on the title song are taken into account. The lyrics have Satanic overtones." It was asserted in 2000 that "the band quickly gained a reputation for courting controversy," by being banned by the Australian Broadcasting Tribunal and by the acts of violence at various times perpetrated upon them with knives and guns. The Mystery of Sixes, along with Public Execution supported the Dead Kennedys in Brisbane in 1983.

Meanwhile, the Vampire Lovers were the type of group, according to the Bucketfull of Brains magazine, to "embody an enjoyably snotty early eighties zombie-punk-schlock vibe." It was claimed that "Through their intermittent break ups and infrequent gigs, has enjoyed special cult status throughout Australia". Buzzsaw Popstar their most recognisable song was declared by Rob Younger (from Radio Birdman) "a masterpiece". Tim Yohannan from U.S. fanzine, Maximum Rocknroll, reviewed the original E.P's lyrics as “pretty decent” and “highly caustic”. They disbanded in 1984 only to reform in 1988 after the popularity of the Buzzsaw Popstar 1987 single re-release.

The Black Assassins were another popular live punk band from the early 1980s. The band claimed that, "Their songs and stage act were energetic and highly political, focussing on issues of the day...". The Black Assassins supported the Dead Kennedys at Brisbane's Festival Hall in 1983.

During the same early 1980s period 'hardcore' punk bands also appeared in Brisbane, particularly from 1983 onwards. Two of the more prominent hardcore groups were New Improved Testament and the La Fetts. New Improved Testament, existed from 1983 – 1984 with Fred Noonan on drums. Fred Noonan also drummed previously with Public Execution and went on much later to Six Ft Hick.

"Hard and abrasive 4 piece which attracted a large and often violent reaction", was how Hutson and Sawford described La Fetts. La Fetts' track, "SEQEB Scabs" (1985), was written by the group in protest against Bjelke-Petersen's government sacking over 1000 electrical industry workers for going on strike.

Of other Punk bands of Brisbane's third generation were Aftermath, Dumb Show, Kicks, Pictish Blood, The Pits, Presidents 11, The Screaming Tribesmen, Strange Glory, Toxic Garden Gnomes, Xero, The Differentials and studio band the Parameters – who were known for their rock song with punk like sentiments, Pig City, which was released as a single in September 1984. Andrew Stafford used it in the title of his book, Pig City: from the Saints to Savage Garden (2004). He explained the choice: "it was really a rallying call, and a signature song for Brisbane at that time. Certainly if you listened to ZZZ in that period, the song was inescapable and it was so symbolic of living in Brisbane at that time, it described so vividly what it was like to live here. And also, it described police and political corruption in this State three or four years before anyone had heard of Tony Fitzgerald."

Popular venues from this particular time include Amyl's Nitespace, Zits, The Australian National Hotel, and the South Brisbane Blind Hall. The Treasury Hotel downstairs, near the Elizabeth Street Bar (White Chairs) became an important hang out for those of a Hardcore Punk and Oi! persuasion during the stretch of 1983 to 1987.

=== From punk to alternative rock (1985–88) ===
During 1983 a large number of Alternative acts appeared in the local underground music scene. Brisbane's original spirit of punk begun to wane; eventually it was lost in 1985. It was superseded by the alternative rock movement. It has been said, "Essentially, "alternative" is a catch-all for post-punk bands that appeared as new wave began to die out in 1983–84, and runs all the way into 1995, when alternative pop/rock is the mainstream."

Although some of Brisbane bands continued with punk after 1984, they drastically changed and became absorbed as part of the alternative rock scene. The original attributes of nihilism, despair and hate from the punk's spirit were discarded and twisted into the hardcore fashion of social activism and political correctness. It became a far cry from the earlier punk era. The Brisbane punk groups of the late 1980s were influenced by the strong Sydney alternative music scene as well as from California's hardcore.

Generically speaking, the punk music scene in Brisbane during the mid to late 1980s period split mostly into three main basic categories. These categories during this time were the Detroit rock and the closely aligned Garage punk groups, with Hardcore punk / thrash bands being almost as large in number. A smaller contingent of Skate punk groups made the third category. Stylistically or in a Punk fashion sense, many of the bands (except for some of the hardcore scene) and their fans replaced the generic style of spikey or outlandish mow hawk hair (for the period), cheap items of attire, studded belts, sewn-in tight trousers, leather and PVC in favor of longer hair, casual clothing sometimes incorporating skater shorts and skateboards, which was in line with the skate punk style.

Bands of the early 1980s, such as The Screaming Tribesmen and Presidents 11 originally began with aspects of punk, however, they quickly diverged beyond the punk genre to explore wider alternative tastes. Also since the early 1980s, an assortment of Punk fusion bands speckled the local punk movement, with a mixture of various musical styles that belonged outside punk rock including Country and Western (The Kingswoods and Tex Deadly and the Dum Dums, both early to mid 1980s), Ska (BLoWHaRD, late 1989 to 1990s), Rockabilly (The Skeletones, mid 1980s) and Heavy Metal (The Dreamkillers, late 1989 to 1990s)

Brisbane "alternative" punk bands that belonged to the particular era between 1985 and 1988 are as follows. ACT, The Adorable Ones, Bad Ronald, Criminally Insane/Rabid Souls, Death of a Nun, The Dinky Flyers, Disorderly Public Outbreak, The Egyptians, The Four Horsemen, The Girlies, The Horny Toads, Hotel Breslin, La Fetts, Insane Hombres, The Pineapples from the Dawn of Time, Post No Bills, Prince of Weasels, Never Again, Oral Injury, Psycho Circus, Reality Damage, Sanity Assassins, The Slam, Subsonic Barflies, Thrash this Trash, Vampire Lovers, Voodoo Lust, Crucified Truth, Dementia 13, Mungabeans, Water Rats Picnic, Aloha Pussycats and one of Brisbane only all female bands Batswing Saloon, Sentinel and Trash of all Nations.

Venues include The Outpost, The Lands Office Hotel, Sensoria and The Love Inn.

=== A new political era? (1988 onwards) ===
Brisbane has continued to produce acts which espouse punk ideologies and/or aesthetics, diversifying in attitudes and stylistic influences according to international trends characterising the nineties. While the overt police brutality of the Bjelke-Petersen era waned after the end of his reign in 1987, Brisbane was still experienced as stiflingly conservative, and post World Expo 88, increasingly expensive. Alternative rock, post-punk and skate punk continued, with additional influences of 90s grunge, hardcore, shoegaze, indie-pop, ska and pop-punk trends. Performances diversified to reflect an increased representation of feminine, queer, post-modern, surrealist and/or overtly ideological perspectives relative to the raw, 'snot-driven', straightforward approach of punk predecessors more closely influenced by rock and roll. The latter was still channeled to an extent, but its prominence and subversive reputation had yielded to the political ambiguities of the nineties.

In 1993, 4ZZZ purchased their Fortitude Valley headquarters from the Communist Party of Australia, which had diminished in relevance following the dissolution of the Soviet Union. 4zzz has since persisted to operate in this settled, alternative cultural zone, in which punk aesthetics and/or ideals have been a mainstay alongside the station's prominent new left orientation and anarchist and/or socialist activists.

Notable bands beginning in the 1990s include Brisbane underground music mainstays Clag, who music journalist Everett True described as "...a beacon of weirdness, surreal humour and unrepentant femaleness." Clag employed 'reckless genre swapping', unconventional stage theatrics and goaded their audience with banter, resulting in hecking that front-woman Bek Moore described as 'fairly vicious' and 'involved people throwing things'. An example of Brisbane punk of the mid-early 2000s was Anal Traffic, who used sexually charged shock value, blatant parodies of rock stage conventions, and intentionally unconventional bricolage outfits to reinforce sardonic, politically charged lyrics.

=== Recent years (late 2000s-present) ===
Venues including Trainspotters, Stepinn (defunct), Prince of Wales Hotel, The Trans, the Foundry, the Bearded Lady, the Beetle Bar (defunct), the Underdog (defunct) have hosted performances in recent years, along with informal spaces such as the William Jolly Bridge. A prominent example of Brisbane punk culture noted by music journalist Everett True is the Negative Guest List punk zine which released printed volumes from 2009 to 2012, one of which is archived in the National Library of Australia.

== See also ==
- List of Brisbane suburbs
- Pig City music festival and symposium
- Popular Theatre Troupe
- The Cane Toad Times
- Brisbane Live Music

== Bibliography ==
- Hutson, Doug; Sawford, Gavin (1988). Out of the Unknown: Brisbane Bands 1976–1988. Brisbane: Time Off.
- McFarlane, Ian (1999). The Encyclopedia of Australian Rock and Pop. St. Leonards, NSW: Allen & Unwin. ISBN 1-86508-072-1.
- McKinnon, Robert; Negric, Frank (1986). "The Absolute Beginners Guide to Brisbane Bands" November 1986 pp. 13-15 Semper Floreat. Brisbane: University of Queensland Union.
- Savage, Jon (1991). England's Dreaming: Anarchy, Sex Pistols, Punk Rock, and Beyond. New York: Faber and Faber.
- Spencer, Chris; Nowara, Zbig; McHenry, Paul (2002) [1989]. Who's Who of Australian Rock (5th ed.). Noble Park, Vic: The Five Mile Press.
- Walker, Clinton (1981). Inner City Sound. NSW: Wild & Woolley. ISBN 9780909331481.
- Walker, Clinton (1996). Stranded: The Secret History of Australian Independent Music 1977-1991. NSW: Pan Macmillan.
