= Punk rock in Australia =

Australian music scene

Australian musicians played and recorded some of the earliest punk rock, led by the Saints who released their first single in 1976. Subgenres of punk music, such as local hardcore acts, still have a strong cult following throughout Australia.

Many of the pioneers, like the Saints, Sydney band Radio Birdman, and young Perth musician Kim Salmon, were highly influenced by proto-punk sounds from Detroit. A distinct Brisbane punk scene emerged in the 1970s. By 1977, other bands began to form in Sydney, under the influence of Radio Birdman and other local and overseas acts. During the late 1970s, former members of Radio Birdman contributed to several new bands. These bands and other Australian and overseas punk acts were supported by public radio stations. In Melbourne scene, art rock had segued into punk, then evolved into post-punk, typified by the careers of Nick Cave, Rowland S. Howard and the Little Band scene. Another pioneering figure of Australian postpunk was Saints founder Ed Kuepper.

== 1973–1976 ==
The Saints, formed in Brisbane, Queensland, in 1973, were one of Australia's first punk bands. The earliest incarnation of the Saints was formed by Ed Kuepper (guitar) and Chris Bailey (vocals). They shared a background in immigrant families (Kuepper's German and Bailey's Irish), and an admiration for high energy 1950s and 1960s music, such as the Detroit rock of the Stooges and MC5. During that time, Queensland was under the control of the conservative, allegedly authoritarian Country Party democratic government of Sir Joh Bjelke-Petersen. In mid-1976, the Saints recorded and distributed copies of their single "(I'm) Stranded", which met nearly no critical or public response in Australia. In the UK, however, Sounds magazine received a copy, and declared it: "single of this and every week". As a result, the band was signed to a three-album contract with EMI. Later the same year they recorded their first LP, which was also called (I'm) Stranded. Hampered by poor production and the indifference of radio stations, the LP failed commercially. In December the Saints moved to Sydney.

During 1974, Radio Birdman formed in Sydney, led by another immigrant, Detroit-born medical student Deniz Tek. They also shared an interest in the Stooges and MC5, albeit with a result arguably more akin to hard rock than punk. Their dynamic live shows soon gained a fanatical following at inner city venues. Radio Birdman released an EP (Burn My Eye) and an album (Radios Appear) with better production values, but with similar commercial results to the Saints' endeavours.

In Adelaide, the first punk band was Black Chrome, which formed in 1975, followed by JAB in 1976. Black Chrome's music attacked Australian apathy, its urban wasteland and its non-existent youth culture. JAB billed themselves as "Synthetic Shock Rock" and were the first Australian punk band to use live synthesisers and tape loop guitar and synthesiser solos. Adelaide in this period was a staid, conservative, and unreceptive city, and consequently the bands were ignored, feared, and could not secure gigs unless they booked venues themselves without disclosing that they were punk bands. Black Chrome's Simon Stretton, who also founded the record label Tomorrow Records, recorded many early punk bands, including JAB, the Chosen Few, Bohdan X, the Accountants, the U-Bombs, the Dagoes, Psychosurgeons, the Lipstick Killers, Riff Raff, and Young Modern, as well as later punk. In some cases, they are the only audio record of the band. Riff Raff played at the Seacliff Hotel, while Irving and the U-Bombs were mixing reggae with punk at the Belair Hotel. The Dagoes were later described by Donald Robertson of Roadrunner as "a mutant brainchild of various import record store owners". The Accountants learnt to play in the northern suburb of Elizabeth.

In Perth – a geographically isolated city with social and political similarities to Brisbane – young musicians like Kim Salmon, Dave Faulkner and James Baker were also influenced by the Detroit bands, as well as New York proto-punk figures like Lou Reed and the New York Dolls. Salmon led the Cheap Nasties, and then the Scientists, before embarking on a solo career (and is regarded as a pioneer of grunge). Baker was in a short-lived act called the Geeks, before forming the Victims with Faulkner in 1977. They recorded an acclaimed single, "Television Addict", before breaking up. Baker later joined the Scientists. Faulkner gravitated towards poppier sounds. In 1981, he and Baker founded a successful retro rock act, the Hoodoo Gurus.

== 1977–1980 ==
By 1977, other bands were starting to form in Sydney, under the influence of local and overseas punk acts. The early Sydney punk scene centred around the Sydney inner city suburbs, and the Grand Hotel in Haymarket in particular. Among the first was the Last Words, from Liverpool in Sydney. (They recorded their first single "Animal World/Wondering Why" in 1977.) Other Sydney bands in 1977 included the Hellcats (featuring Ron Peno, later lead singer of the Died Pretty), the Psychosurgeons (later known as Lipstick Killers), Johnny Dole & the Scabs and The Thought Criminals (who featured Steven Phillip, later of Do-Re-Mi and John Hoey, who was also later in Died Pretty).

These bands and other Australian and overseas punk acts were strongly supported by public radio stations, especially 2JJ. Punk bands like the Reals (featuring Ollie Olsen) and the Babeez (later known as the News) were also being formed in Melbourne. In Brisbane, the Survivors (who showed a 1960s influence), the Leftovers (diverse influences), Razar and the Fun Things (Detroit rock) all followed in the wake of the Saints.

After the British punk scene took off in 1977, both the Saints and Radio Birdman moved to the UK. This proved to be disastrous for both bands. Neither of them fit in with, or were inclined to adjust to aspects of the London scene at the time, such the now-established punk fashion in clothes. Radio Birdman were dumped when their record company got into financial difficulty, and soon broke up. Later recordings saw the Saints adopt soul, blues and jazz influences, although their most successful single, "This Perfect Day" – which reached number 34 in the UK singles chart – was typical of the band's musical style. After another acclaimed single, "Know Your Product", and second and third albums failed to make an impression, EMI dropped the Saints. (Kuepper left in 1979 and Bailey began to pursue a more mainstream musical direction.) Last Words later followed their predecessors to the UK and also failed to make a strong impression.

The Saints bassist, Algy Ward continued to make significant impact in the London punk scene however, when he left The Saints to play with British punk rock band, the Damned and to work with Lemmy and Fast Eddie Clarke of Motörhead, playing on The Damned's comeback album Machine Gun Etiquette (1979), which was released on proto punk and pub rock record label, Chiswick Records, who had also released Motörhead's early records. Joe Strummer, Lemmy and Paul Simonon also appear on the album. The reissue of the album includes the band's take on The Sweet's "Ballroom Blitz". The album also features sometime Pink Floyd lyricist Anthony Moore on synthesiser. Philip Lloyd-Smee (who is known for his design work for Syd Barrett as well as for the lettering and Gothic calligraphic work on Joe Petagno's early Motörhead logo; though the "War-Pig" image itself is by Petagno. ) contributed to the sleeve and logo design work on Machine Gun Etiquette.

During his time with The Damned, Ward also played bass on cover versions including Motörhead's "Over the Top" (released later under the collective moniker Motordamned), the MC5's "Looking at You" and live, the band played the Sex Pistols' "Pretty Vacant" and The Stooges' "I Feel Alright". He toured with the band worldwide, including America in 1979 where they played at Whisky A Go Go, Hollywood, and the Waldorf in San Francisco, significantly influencing the American Hardcore scene. Ward appeared on the live performance on The Old Grey Whistle Test in England featuring "Smash It Up", before he was fired from the group due to animosity between him and drummer Rat Scabies. He was replaced by former Eddie and the Hot Rods and UFO (band) bassist Paul Gray.

Speaking of Algy Ward's contribution to the album in an interview with Louder than War online punk rock fanzine, Captain Sensible said "Algy was immense on Machine Gun (Etiquette). The sound was largely based on the thundering bass lines that he delivered, it was a beautiful noise. And then Paul (Gray) came along and was a very fluent and flowing kind of bass player."

By the end of 1977, the Melbourne supergroup Young Charlatans had formed from the remnants of earlier bands. They included Ollie Olsen, Rowland S. Howard (guitar, later in the Birthday Party), Jeff Wegener (drums, former member of the Saints, later in the Laughing Clowns) and Janine Hall (later in the Saints). The band recorded the first version of the Howard song "Shivers". In Sydney, a Birdman offshoot, the Hitmen, had started to gig and Ian Rilen formed the longevitous X.

On 8 November 1977 the ABC nightly news magazine program "This Day Tonight" broadcast a feature on Australian punk rock, featuring a live recording of Black Chrome at Adelaide University's Union Hall, with commentary and interviews highlighting the largely negative contemporary attitudes to punk rock. The introductory voice over concluded;

″... but if you're wondering if its going to take off in a big way here, its worth remembering that the quiet streets of Adelaide are a long, long way from the streets of London. The message of punk rock is violence and anarchy; and its a message which has got Adelaide radio stations on the defensive.″[165]

In April 1978 Black Chrome released the single "Australia's God" on their own label Tomorrow Records,[166] but despite the band driving around Australia to the few record shops selling punk rock and delivering it to radio stations around the country, it failed to secure airplay and sold in tiny numbers. "Wallaby Beat" in 2011; "It must be said that of all the original 1977 Aussie bands Black Chrome are the one most shrouded in mystery. The single remains unheard (but not unloved) and the facts we can report are scant... so to the record, perhaps the most singular sounding of the first generation Australian punk records with its restrained fuzz, and strange (moaning?) backing vocals. It's in the lyrics where the punch is packed."[167]

Entrepreneurs began to realise the potential of the growing scene and Michael Gudinski launched the Melbourne-based Suicide Records, which in May 1978 released a compilation, Lethal Weapons. The album included tracks by the Boys Next Door, Teenage Radio Stars (featuring future Models members Sean Kelly and James Freud, and also La Femme members bassist Graham Schiavello and drummer Pete Kidd), JAB (ex-experimental rockers from Adelaide, featuring Bohdan X and synthesizer player Ash Wednesday), the Survivors and X-Ray-Z (former pub rockers from Adelaide). However the royalty rate offered by Suicide was low and both the News and Young Charlatans decided not to get involved. Keith Glass launched the Melbourne-based Missing Link Records, which between 1978–80 released La Femme's singles & Album, They were the first independent band on Countdown and opened "Suburban pub rock" to local punk bands. Keith Glass also managed the Boys Next Door and released all their music through to the change to the Birthday Party.

Australian chart success eluded all of these bands in the late 1970s. Radio programmers were conservative and unenthusiastic about punk. The above artists who eventually found success either did so overseas, or after a remove of several years in Australia, and/or in different bands.

== 1979–1991 ==
During the late 1970s, former members of Radio Birdman contributed to several new Sydney bands: the New Christs, the Visitors, the Passengers (featuring Angie Pepper) and the Screaming Tribesmen. Two distinctive, long-lasting Sydney bands, the Celibate Rifles and Lime Spiders, were formed in 1979. Meanwhile, other Sydney groups like X and feedtime carried the punk energy of their forebears into nascent noise rock territory. In Melbourne, post-punk sounds began to take over, typified by the "little band scene". By the early 1980s, only a handful of bands were still playing songs with classic punk sounds, such as the Cosmic Psychos and the satirically-inclined Painters and Dockers.

Melbourne's La Femme were a fascinating meld of late Seventies influences: punk, new wave, glam and hard rock. Their 1978 debut single Chelsea Kids is one of the all-time classic Australian singles and their only LP: La Femme, is arguably one of the best to come out of Melbourne's late 1970s punk/new wave scene (which included Models and the Boys Next Door). It contains many fine examples of the band's confident, swaggering glam-infused punk-metal sound. Lead singer Chane Chane was a charismatic, hyperactive front man, a refreshing personality with a strong audience rapport. Guitarist Brett Walker was a real live flashy guitar hero for the times, coming on like a punk-metal Mick Ronson by pealing off large chunks of dense power riffing when other guitarists were still going plink-plonk. The thuggish rhythm section of Peter Kidd and Graham Schiavello played it mean and hard, providing the relentless, driving beat. La Femme could well have made it into the big league if they’d wanted but swimming against the commercial tide seemed to be their raison d'être. In many ways they were their own worst enemies. An unwillingness to play the pop star game and the serious drug addiction, among other things, perhaps ended up compromising the band's drive. For an inner-city band with so much potential, in the end they really did give it away. They toured constantly, built up a huge support base on the suburban pub circuit, scored several prestigious support gigs, made three appearances on Countdown (one of the first punk/new wave/alternative bands to do so), released one of the great Melbourne punk albums and yet they never rose above being a cult attraction.

The Quick and the Dead, who played in Perth during 1979–81, pioneered a sound closely related to Oi!. They attracted media attention resulting from the behaviour of some fans, including violence and the use of Nazi regalia. Some Brisbane punk rock bands prolonged their unique punk direction from the Seventies, that was in part due to Premier Joh Bjelke-Petersen's continued use of the Queensland Police against perceived threats to the government.

The Boys Next Door, renamed the Birthday Party in 1980 and featuring Nick Cave, were pioneers in incorporating "darker" elements into their image, with connections to the genres of gothic rock, horror punk and deathrock. Other prominent examples included Brisbane bands Vampire Lovers and Mystery of Sixes.

"Gothic School Of Twilight Punk"
This is an early demo musical recording of the Vampire Lovers demonstrating their punk sound intertwined with dark imagery. Produced by Steve Messingham.

A fourth generation of bands, such as the Hard-Ons (from Sydney) and Exploding White Mice (from Adelaide), also emerged. Former members of the Celibate Rifles and Lime Spiders formed the Eastern Dark, a short-lived but well-regarded act. Australian hardcore punk acts also emerged, such as Massappeal, who began gigging in Sydney during 1985. Additionally, bands such as The Hellmen, Toys Went Berserk, Happy Hate me Nots, Bits of Kids and Wet Taxis existed in the latter half of the 1980s.

From Brunswick emerged the smooth distorted sound of the Zorros with their single from Missing Link records "Too Young" reaching Number 3 in Radio RRR charts. The Zorros would play hard and fast and pack out many venues.

== Punk revival since 1991 ==
By the early 1990s, the success of grunge music, American punk veterans and revivalists, as well as local bands like the Hybernators, the Speed Demons, the Meanies, Frenzal Rhomb, and Screamfeeder led to the formation of punk-influenced bands such as the Living End, Jebediah, Bodyjar, 28 Days, Dreamkillers, Four Zero One Four, Align, Tiltmeter and Guttersnipes. Punk revival scenes began in various cities around Australia.

In Melbourne, punk has seen a resurgence in recent years. Along with straight up punk bands like Dixon Cider, Scrayfish, the Half Pints, Let's Jump Ship and the Flying Rats forming, there have also been the emergence of folk punk bands like Gentleman's Riot, Mutiny and Catgut Mary and skate punk bands such as Bombs Are Falling and Postscript . The reforming of many earlier punk bands from the 1980s (such as Bastard Squad and Depression) has also been prominent. The Late 2000s has also seen a resurgence in street punk across the Australian east coast with bands like No Idea (VIC), the Scam(QLD), the Lost Cause (QLD), Deputy Dipshit (QLD), the Worst (VIC), Stay Down (TAS), Wot Rot (VIC) and many more leaving their mark.

In Adelaide, primarily driven by a resurgence of interest driven by the internet, the publication of early punk discographies, and requests to play from venues and contemporary punk bands, Black Chrome reformed in 2010. They have since appeared on several contemporary live punk compilation albums, and from 2018 commenced releasing new material.

Vans Warped Tour successfully returned to Australia in 2013 after an 11-year hiatus, however many DIY grass roots events stepped up to fill the gap.

More recent popular Aussie punk groups include Amyl and the Sniffers and The Chats.

== Publications, stores, and other resources ==
DNA was a fanzine created by Harry Butler in Adelaide in 1979, and was edited and mostly written by him. Published by EC Productions, it continued to cover local punk, alternative, and underground bands. In the 1980s it began to release cassettes, made locally by amateurs, of the music presented in the magazine, and later started distributing other fanzines and music releases from around Australia. In the early 1990s, EC Productions co-owned Thrash Grind Grunge music store at 276 Morphett Street, Adelaide. It then started producing music by local bands on CD, using a CD burner, and around 1999 released its first vinyl record. EC Productions also sold new and secondhand music in all formats, as well as music-related books and magazines, and was part of a cooperative of researchers who documented contemporary Australian and New Zealand music. It is unclear whether the business continues to operate, but the last issue of DNA available on their website was published in 2019. Issue 36 (1984) is available free to read online, via Yumpu.

Another notable fanzine focused on punk was the Melbourne-based Regression (1982–1984), created by Zol Szacsuri and Alby Brovedani of the band Vicious Circle. There were many others, with names such as Aliens Mutants Senseless Violence, Consumer Junk, Decline, End Result, Family Slaughterhouse, Invictus Pax, Obituary, Portobello Market, Resistant Harmony, Stone the Flamin' Crows, The Rage, and Work Consume Die.

The Society of Australian Punk (SOAP) is a non-profit organisation based in Melbourne, whose listed first purpose is: "To represent, showcase, promote and celebrate the research and preservation of Australian punk subculture". Its website contains links to many resources, including publications of all kinds, film and video, other websites, radio programs, and exhibitions.

== In film ==
Dogs in Space is a 1986 Australian feature drama film set in Melbourne's "Little Band" post-punk music scene in 1978, written and directed by Richard Lowenstein and starring Michael Hutchence.

Age of Rage: The Australian Punk Revolution, a documentary film directed by Jennifer Ross, premiered at the Melbourne International Film Festival in August 2022, and was also screened at the 11th edition of the Antenna Documentary Film Festival in Sydney in October. Ross interviewed many punk musicians for the film, who "would turn up to interviews with a box of 30 years of their life". She scanned and archived everything she was given, and took around a year to edit the film after selecting appropriate clips. Dale Cornelius wrote the score, which was nominated for an AACTA Award for Best Original Music Score in a Documentary in the 12th AACTA Awards.

== See also ==
- Music of Australia
- Australian hardcore
