= Ash Wednesday (musician) =

Australian musician

- Born: Australia
- Genres: Electronic, industrial, avant-garde, rock
- Instruments: Vocals, bass guitar, keyboards, synthesizer
- Years active: 1976–present
- Labels: Cleopatra Records, Regular Records, Mannequin Records, It Records
- Formerly of: JAB, Models, The Metronomes, Thealonian Music, Modern Jazz, Crashland, Einstürzende Neubauten, The Tingler

Ash Wednesday is an Australian musician, who played in JAB, Models and Einstürzende Neubauten.

== Biography ==
Wednesday was a founding member of JAB, an Australian punk rock band, in Adelaide in January 1976. The band's original lineup consisted of Bohdan X (Bodhan Kubiakowski) on guitar and vocals, Wednesday playing bass guitar, synthesizer and tapes and Johnny Crash (Janis Friedenfelds) on drums and vocals. The band took its name from the first initials of the founding members. The band relocated to Melbourne in August 1977. JAB signed to Suicide Records in January 1978, and two of their songs, "Blonde and Bombed" and "Let's Go", were included on the Lethal Weapons compilation. In April, 1978 JAB (now also featuring Bobby Stopa on bass) were described in the Melbourne Age as 'essentially a good rock band who give a tight, practiced performance'. JAB played its final show on 5 August 1978 at the Crystal Ballroom (then known as the Seaview Hotel's Winter Garden Room), which was also the first gig ever played at the now iconic venue.

Wednesday, Crash and Pierre Voltaire then joined Sean Kelly (ex-Teenage Radio Stars) to form the first line-up of Models. The initial version of the group did not stay together for long as Voltaire was soon replaced on bass guitar by Mark Ferrie (ex-Myriad), then in August 1979, Wednesday quit alongside the band's manager, Karen Marks. He later said 'I wanted to write pop. I wanted the Models to have top 20 hits, but Shaun [sic] was worried about what people might think. That was the problem then. Did we want to be a pop band?' Wednesday was replaced by Andrew Duffield (ex-Whirlywirld) on keyboards. At the end of the year he performed (alongside percussionist Neil Giles) in a show titled 'Absolute Pop' formulated by Mick Drennan.

In 1980 Wednesday released a solo single, 'Love By Numbers', which featured Marks' vocals alongside his own, and co-wrote and produced four songs for Marks, two of which were released as a single, 'Cold Cafe'. That year he also joined experimental outfit The Metronomes with rock journalist Al Webb (guitar, synthesiser; ex-Streetlife) and Andrew Picouleau (bass, synthesiser; Secret Police, Sacred Cowboys), having previously been an invited guest with the band. The Metronomes released two singles, "Saturday Night"/"Sunday Morning" (1979), "A Circuit Like Me"/"Closed Circuit" (1980) and two albums, Multiple Choice (1981) and Regular Guys (1985) on the Cleopatra label. The band was never intended to be a live outfit and only ever came together in the studio.

Concurrently Wednesday collaborated with T.E. Power (Nuvo Bloc) on a project titled Thealonian Music, using the latest electronic instruments. The concept was to generate spontaneous music with the rhythmic foundation provided by a programmable drum machine, sequencer and synthesizer combination. Thealonian Music only produced one release, the 1982 tape, Project X Chromosome X.

Throughout the early 1980s, Wednesday was a member of Modern Jazz, an improvisation group who performed to randomly generated techno beats. Modern Jazz featured a fluid line-up that included Lyn Gordon (synthesiser), Andrew Park (synthesiser) and Ted Thornbury (vocals). The band played 1980s techno music and issued one album, The Nude, on the Cleopatra label in 1986. In late 1984, Wednesday told Age journalist Matthew Stevens: 'I don't like getting into a habit. I don't want the music to become a chore. Band members have to be interpreters. What Modern Jazz plays should reflect the varying moods and personalities of its players.'

In 1988 Wednesday and Lyn Gordon formed electronic / industrial band Crashland, with a line-up of Lyn Gordon (vocal, guitar), Wednesday (sampler), Ray Moore (drums) and Phil Sutherland (bass). A year after their formation, Crashland signed a deal with Regular Records resulting in the release of their first single, "Cherry Bomb"/"Elvis Working" in October 1989. Crashland's self-titled debut album, comprising half original material and half covers, was released in April 1990 together with the band's second single, a demented electro remodelling of John Lee Hooker's "Boom Boom"/"On T.V.".

Wednesday moved to Berlin in 1992, where he worked with Nina Hagen, being involved with pre-production and programming for her 1995 album, released in German FreuD euch and English (Bee Happy).

In 1997, Wednesday became a touring member of German band Einstürzende Neubauten. He completed several world tours with them and is present on their live albums, such as 09-15-2000, Brussels and numerous recordings from the Perpetuum Mobile tour (2004). He left the group in 2013, having already returned to Melbourne to live.

In 1999 he formed The Tingler, with Crashland vocalist Lyn Gordon. The Tingler released a self-titled album in April 2000. The Tingler also featured on the bill during the Models 2000/2001 reunion shows.

Around 2000 The Metronomes began work on a new project and after four years of sporadic effort released a new album, Today. This was followed by a re-release of the band's first two albums and an EP (comprising the band's two singles), as a single release, The Ballad of the Metronomes, in 2010.

In 2013 he performed solo as The Ash Wednesday Effect, a spontaneous audio/visual experience, in which improvised soundscapes triggered entrancing visualisation, which were in turn projected onto Wednesday's physical form. The performances at Club Voltaire, North Melbourne were continuous three-hour pieces, throughout which audience members were free to come and go as they chose.

== Discography ==
=== Models (1979–1980) ===
- Melbourne – Shock (2001)

=== Solo ===
- "Love By Numbers"/"Boring Instrumental" – Independent (1980)
- A Place to Live (digital) – Independent (2017)

=== The Metronomes ===
- "Saturday Night"/"Sunday Morning" – Cleopatra (CSP 2203) (1979)
- "A Circuit Like Me"/"Closed Circuit" – Cleopatra (CSP 2205) (September 1980)
- Multiple Choice – Cleopatra (CLP 210) (1981)
- Regular Guys – Cleopatra (CLP 212) (1985)
- Today (2004)
- The Ballad of the Metronomes – Mannequin (29 November 2010)
- Time Keeping (1979–1985) It records (November 2014)
- Going Somewhere – It records (June 2016)

=== Thealonian Music ===
- Project X Chromosome X (1982)

=== Modern Jazz (1983–1987 ===
- The Nude – Cleopatra (CLP 215) (1986)

=== Crashland (1988–1991) ===
- "Cherry Bomb"/"Elvis Working" – Regular (K919) (October 1989)
- Crashland – Regular (D30149) (April 1990)
- "Boom Boom'/"On TV" – Regular (K 1096) (April 1990)

=== Einstürzende Neubauten (1997–2004) ===
- 09-15-2000, Brussels – Caroline (2001)
- Gemini – Caroline (2003)
- Perpetuum Mobile Tour – Caroline (2004)
- 04-01-2004, Amsterdam – Caroline (2004)
- 10-29-2004, Reggio Emilia – Caroline (2004)

=== The Tingler (1999–2001) ===
- The Tingler – Independent (2001)
