= Out of the Unknown (disambiguation) =

Out of the Unknown may refer to:

- Out of the Unknown, a British television series that ran from 1965 and 1971
- Out of the Unknown (collection)
- Out of the Unknown: Brisbane Bands 1976-1988
- "Out of the Unknown", a song by Died Pretty from the 1987 album Pre-Deity
