= Josh Lord =

Josh Lord may refer to:

- Josh Lord (artist)
- Josh Lord (rugby union)
