= The Chosen Few (1970s Australian band) =

Australian punk band

- Origin: Mornington Peninsula, Victoria, Australia
- Genres: Punk rock
- Years active: 1978–1979, 1998–1999
- Labels: A Few, Buckwheat Headlock/Existential Vacuum, Au Go Go, Hate
- Past members: Ian Cunningham; Cal McAlpine; Iain Weaver; Bruce Friday; Bill Blanche; Jeff Hussey

The Chosen Few were an Australian punk band which formed in 1978. Three founding bandmates were all from an earlier hard rock band, Deathwish: Ian John Cunningham on bass guitar (later on lead vocals), Calum "Cal" McAlpine on drums and Bruce Friday on guitar. They were soon joined by Iain Weaver on lead vocals (died 1995). The Chosen Few formed in the Mornington Peninsula and played a combination of covers of United States-influenced punk (MC5, Stooges) and hard driven original numbers inspired by Lobby Loyde and the Coloured Balls and The Saints.

In 1978 The Chosen Few released a six-track extended play, The Jokes on Us. It was recorded in a studio in Smith Street, Collingwood, with Baron Rolls as audio engineer. The band played regularly around the Melbourne and Adelaide punk scenes but disbanded in May 1979. They joined Bohdan X (ex-JAB) as Bohdan and the Instigators but they broke up by late 1980.

There was a short lived reunion of The Chosen Few in 1998 with a new line up: Cunningham, now on lead vocals, and McAlpine, were joined by Bill Blanche on bass guitar and Jeff Hussey on lead guitar. Two albums were released in that year: Do the Manic (Buckwheat Headlock Productions/Existential Vacuum Records, US) and A Root and a Beer (Au Go Go Records). They were followed by a double-CD album, Really Gonna Punch You Out (Hate Records, Italy), in 2001.

The band revived briefly in 2018 with the following membership: Ian Cunningham (lead vocals), Jeff Hussey (guitar), Calum Hussey (guitar), Brad Barry (bass) and Alessandro Coco (drums). The band rehearsed for a couple of months intending to play at a punk festival but that event did not eventuate.

The last ever performance was in November 2024. The lineup was Ian Cunningham (lead vocals), Jeff Hussey (guitar), Calum Hussey (bass guitar), Jeff Cairns (drums). The occasion was the singer's 75th birthday party. They played a short set of favourites from the 1978 "The Joke's on Us" EP.
