= Bohdan X =

- Born: Bohdan Roman Kubiakowski; Cambridgeshire, United Kingdom
- Origin: Adelaide, South Australia, Australia
- Genres: Electronic, punk rock
- Occupations: Musician, radio presenter
- Instruments: Vocals, guitar
- Years active: 1976– present
- Labels: Tomorrow, Rumour, Rampant

Bohdan Roman Kubiakowski, better known by his stage name, Bohdan X, is a British Australian former punk rock singer-songwriter and guitarist. He was a member of JAB, which formed in Adelaide in 1976, and Bohdan and the Instigators, which featured in the Melbourne punk rock scene in the late 1970s. He was also a DJ on 3RRR community radio station from 1978 to 1995.

== Early life and education ==
Bohdan X was born as Bohdan Roman Kubiakowski in Cambridgeshire, United Kingdom, in a family with Polish origins. He attended St. Bede's Roman Catholic School (now St. Bede's Inter-Church School) in Birdsall Road, Cambridge from 1963 to 1969, obtaining 6 O-levels.

Seven years later, he relocated to Adelaide, South Australia.

== Musician ==
In January 1976 that year he formed JAB, on guitar and vocals; with Ash Wednesday on bass guitar, synthesiser and tapes; and Johnny Crash (Janis Friedenfelds) on drums and vocals. The band's name is an acronym – using the founders' first initials. JAB began as an experimental, electronic rock band, with synthesisers and guitars, but adopted a punk rock style from 1977. He still wears the same pair of pants he used to wear on stage in the late 70s.

In late 1977 Bohdan recorded his first solo single, "Time to Age"/"You Got Soul", on the Tomorrow label with JAB backing him. Australian musicologist, Ian McFarlane, described the single as "not punk, however, being almost acoustic in a Roy Harper vein". JAB relocated to Melbourne the same year, joining an emerging new wave music scene and frequently playing live. He later recalled the scene was "pretty dull" and that they wanted to "wake the dead with punk music". JAB broke up in August 1978 and Bohdan formed two short-lived groups, Hong Kong and then Bex. In 1979 he formed Bohdan and the Instigators with former members of The Chosen Few, they disbanded by late 1980.

As Bohdan X, his solo releases include a 12-inch extended play, Fear of Flying, on Rumour Records in December 1983. In 1988 he issued a mini-album, Kingsnake, on Rampant Records, which was produced by Ross Wilson and Tony Cohen. Session musicians include James Freud and Mark Ferrie (both ex-Models). Bohdan's performances included fire-eating, "at a Melbourne University gig I set the sprinklers off, twice! The fire brigade tried to charge me $150 per truck but I nipped out the window".

== Radio presenter ==
An independent FM radio station was established at RMIT University in central Melbourne in 1976. It became 3RRR, as a community radio station. In 1978 Bohdan joined the station and began broadcasting a show, Punk with Bohdan X, according to Mark Phillips in Radio City, the program was a "mix of punk and new wave music, along with his unprofessional, shambolic style of announcing, quickly brought him to cult status among the station’s presenters". The shift to broadcasting from being a musician was "better than being in a bloody band, married to blokes who moan all the time". He was suspended for six months after playing the Sex Pistols' B-side track, "Friggin' in the Rigging" (February 1978), which uses the expletive, fuck.

Bohdan lasted on 3RRR for 17 years and, when interviewed in November 2006, he reflected on being a radio presenter telling Larissa Dubecki of The Age, "I said I wanted a punk show. Greig Pickhaver (later known as the comic HG Nelson) said to come down. They got me to come in at 11am and I was on air that afternoon. Volunteers were a lot harder to come by in those days. But I fitted right in; it was like a family". In 1995, the manager, Steven Walker, tried to move Bohdan from his Friday night broadcasting slot – he denounced Walker on-air before turning the power off and vacating the studio, leaving the station off air for over half an hour.

== Later career ==
Bohdan resided in Ballarat after leaving Melbourne. He had qualified with a Diploma in Horticulture from Burnley Horticultural College in 1985, starting a landscaping business in 2000 (wound up, 2020). He worked in Victoria and also in Tennant Creek, NT in the mid-2000s.

Since at least 2012 and as of 2024 Bohdan has a phone-in slot on 3RRR's Vital Bits show on Saturday mornings, where he reports on his life as a sometime accountant, landscape gardener, taxi driver, farmer, and man of the people.
