= Stranded: The Secret History of Australian Independent Music 1977–1991 =

Book by Clinton Walker

- Author: Clinton Walker
- Language: English
- Genre: Non-fiction
- Publisher: Pan Macmillan
- Publication date: 1996
- Publication place: Australia

Stranded: The Secret History of Australian Independent Music 1977–1991 is a book about the Australian independent music scene from 1979 until 1991, as written by author and music journalist Clinton Walker. The books follows two decades of music, from punk, rock, alternative sound to garage-rock and grunge and integrates various first-person accounts from Walker's perspective as well as drawing upon interviews with artists during that time to illustrate the cultural history of Australian sound.

Some of the bands discussed in the book include: The Saints, Radio Birdman, The Birthday Party, The Go-Betweens, Beasts of Bourbon, and Laughing Clowns.

== Contents ==
The music criticism book records the emergence of the punk rock movement in the Australian contemporary music scene, interweaving elements of Walker’s autobiography from the 1970s to the 1990s. Walker’s interest in cultural anthropology and the preservation of Australian musical history has contributed to the publication of several books and literary anthologies spanning topics including Aboriginal music, “endangered Australian live music” and the “social cultural history of life in the Australian suburbs and fringes”

The book is chronological, following interviews with Australian artists across the punk rock screen to reflect the musical history of Australia’s past. Artists interviewed by Walker include: The Saints, Radio Birdman, Leftovers, The Go-Betweens, X, Victims, Spk, Lipstick Killers, Severed Heads, Celibate Rifles, Hard-Ons, Died Pretty, New Christs, God, Spiderbait, You Am I, and Magic Dirt.

Walker discusses the initial sound of music which “set the tone for Australian pub rock to follow”, detailing the difficulties of entertaining new genres in the music scene because of a lack of venues and the elusive nature of records and songs that were kept hidden from public view due to a lack of interest. The Independent Music Scene of Australia in the 1970s emerged through independent bands and artists networking in local communities that “nurtured the emerging punk community”. He presents the circuit of suburban pubs that dominated the music industry and the movement of bands overseas in search of music venue which encouraged the expansion of the alternative, punk rock genre.

Walker reasons that the transformation in “pop aesthetics” from its inception in the 1960s, a time in which the network of information was occurring at a pace that was “unprecedented”, led him to write Stranded.

== Publication ==
Stranded was first published by Pan Macmillan in Australia in 1996. In 2021 a revised edition of Stranded was reprinted by The Visible Spectrum, a distribution channel of Verse Chorus Press. This expanded edition features 175 photos, more personal interjections, thoughts and revised comments on bands and artists by Walker, twenty-five years on.

In the preface to his new edition, Walker states that, “Stranded is not so much about how and why these artists and their music were spurned the way they were- it’s more about how they persisted, survived… It’s a story with an arc that conforms precisely to the classic hero’s journey – the casting-out from the garden, the quest beyond, the triumphant home-coming.”

The title of the book takes its name from a track by The Saints, an Australian rock and roll band that are considered one of the founding groups to influence the sound of punk rock. Walker mentions them several times in Stranded and their radical nature in the revisionist era of punk rock music.

== Release and Promotion ==
Stranded was released in Australia on February 26, 2021 by The Visible Spectrum. It was made available for digital download as an e-book by the iTunes Store.

Interviews To promote the publication of his expanded edition, Walker has been interviewed by Neil Rogers in his ‘Australian Mood’ show on 3RRR and by Phil McDougall for his ‘Sunglasses After Dark’ show on 3PBS.

The on-air interview with Phil McDougall discussed Walker’s first book, “Inner City Sound”, a collection of photographs and articles about the experimentation of genre and sounds within the punk, rock, electro-synth scene. The origins of his interest in Australia’s circuit of live music have contributed to the development of Stranded, published a decade after. Walker states that his first book for Pan Macmillan, “Highway to Hell: The Life and Death of AC/DC Legend Bon Scott” was his first venture into writing a long form narrative and inspired the structure of Stranded. “Highway to Hell” is a biography on singer Bon Scott’s life, tracing his career and personal life, followed by interviews and photos, capturing his presence in the hard rock and heavy metal music arena even after his death.

Walker’s interest in the garage rock cultural milieu is founded in his search for new sounds, “I’d go where the music led me. I was just following my nose around where I found good music. I was 21 years old and just doing what I liked.” Inspired by John Savage’s Dreamland, Walker’s venture into the long-form narrative extended the time frame from where “Inner City Sound” last left off. Inner City Sound is a documentary account of the underground live music scene, containing articles from magazines, newspapers and photographs that span the period of the early 70s to 80s.

Walker has been a guest on Aaron Curran’s podcast “Unmarked Tracks” for two episodes, detailing elements of his biography and his commitment to Australian stories through the art scene of the 70s. The show discusses the movement of independent, grass-roots bands through the Australian stage, Walker’s interactions with Melbourne post-punk and its classic influences that shaped the form of the genre.

== Reviews ==
Walker is described as being in the centre of the Brisbane Sound discourse, utilised as a talking head in documentaries following the publication of Stranded. He is referred to as a cultural intermediary by Scott Regan, a lecturer from QUT whose research examined the contemporary Brisbane music scene, its history and relevance to cultural memory, interrogating analyses of music and the discourse shaped by the media.

Walker’s observation of the Brisbane rock scene has been argued as one with a politicised agenda. Stratton argues that the music and lifestyle that followed the pub rock circuit scene had values that the “Bjelke-Petersen government wanted to stamp out”.

The attempt to silence and eradicate the sound of punk-rock music in Brisbane’s inner-city with the local government championed a more conservative outlook on suburban lifestyles, and by extension music. The initial conservatism attached to the local and live music scene is described in David Nichols’ book, “The Go-Betweens”, stating that “To follow the kind of lifestyle that people in other Australian cities took for granted – going out for the night, hearing a few rock bands who played music relevant to your world, drinking – was infused, in Brisbane, with a special kind of danger. The police could arrest you at any time, and effectively they could do what they wanted with you.”

He has created playlists inspired by stranded that accompany each chapter of the book that can be viewed on YouTube and Spotify. They were initially posted in a spaced-out fashion, with new songs releasing every week. On Spotify, the playlists can now be viewed in seven strands, following specific years of music with artists at the helm.

The book was first published in 1996 by Pan MacMillan, Australia.

== Australian music industry in the 1970s ==
The music underground of the 1970s emerged from the expansion of the inner-city commercial sound which featured mostly mainstream pop and rock music. The subjectivity towards indie-punk, alternative music from independent artists and bands opposed the ‘pop-rock’ canon. largely curated from a spectrum of musical factors that embodied the ethos of popular music at the time. The conglomerate of the music industry* that involves record companies, radio stations and cultural industries including magazines and newspapers grew rapidly in the 50s and 60s, resulting in the dominance of companies, some of which grew to international oligopolies.

The move towards independent sound was linked to record companies that pushed for alternative music and a diverse style of genres, leading to the introduction of sub-genres including indie rock, grunge, punk rock, emo and gothic rock. This was reflected in increased coverage of genre-bending sound in the mid-70s which accompanied Australian rock media, particularly with the creation of Juke and RAM, two music magazines that documented local and overseas rock music, providing interviews, news and a documentation of emerging recording artists that had entered the industry.

New public radio stations introduced in 1975 including 2JJ, 3RRR and 4ZZZ launched a new wave of alternative sound, marking the first visible appearance of independent rock music and streamlined a channel for local music regionally and internationally. The transition to independent music culture was a precursor to the defining sounds of Australian alternative, punk-rock today, resulting from the rise of commercial and alternative media, influence of government policies and the collective of independent music communities to derive a period of renewed social and cultural nationalism.

== Band Profiles ==
The Saints

The Saints are an Australian rock band that originated in Brisbane in 1973 that are one of the most influential groups of the genre. Their first record titled, “(I’m) Stranded”, eponymous with the title of Walker’s book, was released in September 1976 and saw to the usage of defining punk rock characteristics including, nasal vocals, varied tempos and abrupt rhythms. They were the first ‘punk’ band to release music from outside the United States and their single was claimed to be the “single of this and every week” by UK music mag Sounds upon its release. The Saints had formed under the conservative government of Sir Joh Bjelke-Petersen in Queensland and challenged the suppression of punk rock sound which followed the trajectory of rising alternative music and culture that coexisted within the local music scene. Produced and released on their own label, Fatal Records, it sold 500 copies and pre-dated singles by other punk rock bands including the Sex Pistols’, ‘Anarchy in the U.K.’ and The Clash’ release of their song, ‘White Riot’.

The music industry in Queensland, heavily influenced by the Bjelke-Petersen government, was restricted and the cultural history of Brisbane traces back to roots with an attempt to stifle the sound through police intimidation in the underground music scene as gigs in local bars and venues that were licensed were few and far in between.

The Go-Betweens

An Australian alternative, indie-rock band that formed in 1977, The Go-Betweens’ offered a post-punk sensibility that enveloped The Brisbane Sound in the 70s. The Brisbane Sound moved in two circles, the “loud, grungy guitar bands of Screamfeeder ilk” and the “more introspective, sunny Brisbane sound”. The sunny style described is reflected in The Go-Betweens’ album titled, ‘That Striped Sunlight Sound’, an extension upon the Brisbane cultural identity which is tied to the ‘sunshine state’ image.

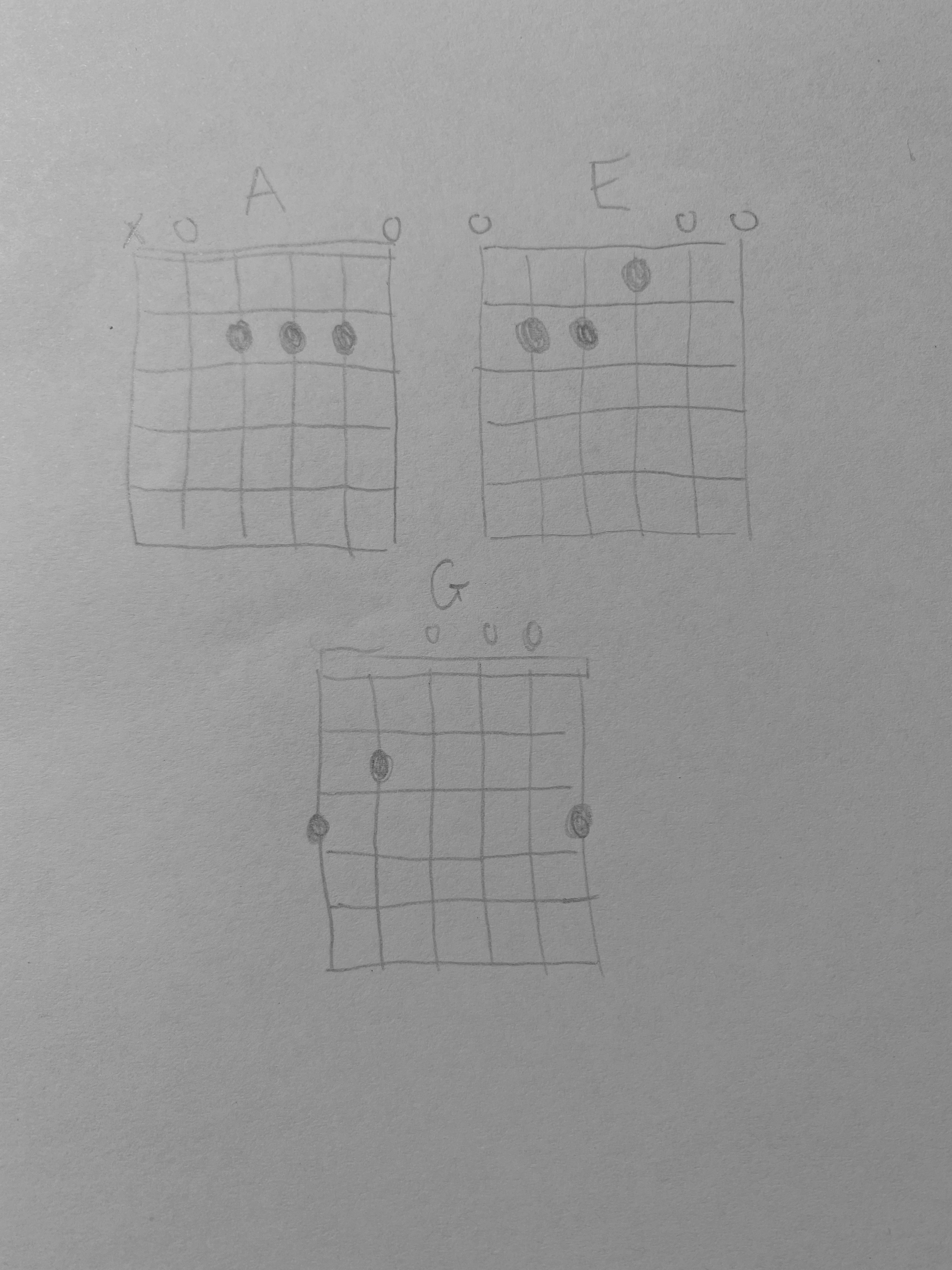
The three main chords that are used in mainstream music, a convention that the punk rock genre deviated from

Their musical aesthetic featured an unusual rhythmic structure, “while the songs chugged along neatly, they threatened to trip up dancers, since they'd often add or subtract a beat from standard rock patterns.” and spearheaded the punk and post-punk era with a sound that split off from the conventional three chord pattern of A, E and G. Sideburns, a punk music fanzine released a graphic for the three chords accompanied by the caption, ‘now form a band’ in 1976, suggesting the ease at which independent artists could find their sound.

== Locations of Cultural Significance ==
Caxton St Hall

The Caxton St Hall (previously named Baroona Hall) held various community events including live music and one gig by The Sharks on the 30 November 1979 ended with seven patrol cars showing up to arrest twelve audience members. Bjelke-Persersen’s twenty year rule saw to Brisbane as being known as the “demolition capital of Australia” as well as “Pig City”, an amalgamation of his authorisation on the demolition of many city buildings, most of which were home to dance and live music venues, and the restrictive measures on punk with the assistance of police intimidation to enforce the Traffic Act as a means to outlaw protests for music, art and political activism.

Club 76

Club 76 was a place that homed The Saints band members and provided rehearsal space for the band during the 1970s. Following a smashed glass plate at the front of the house in protest against the band’s performance, Edmund Kuepper, The Saint’s guitarist proposed to write ‘Club 76’ on the window and use their space for live shows. Clinton Walker was one of the attendees at their shows and noted that “The Saints were a certain ground-zero for Brisbane music”, capitalising on the cultural intermediary of sound that displayed an abrasiveness and garage punk rock absorbed into their music.
