= Josh Lord (artist) =

- Born: 1972 (age 53–54); Mornington, Victoria, Australia
- Occupation: Artist
- Known for: Visual arts

Josh Lord (born 1972) is an independent Australian artist influenced by cultural movements and art genres including pop art, Dada and Surrealism. His paintings are a mix of all those styles and movements.

== Early life and education ==
Lord was born and raised in Mornington, Victoria, Australia. He is a self-taught artist and his inspiration and main influences to pursue a career in visual arts have been Germany's Bauhaus theory, John Brack, James Rosenquist, an American artist who was one of the protagonists in the pop-art movement Robert Rauschenberg and Barbara Kruger.

== Exhibitions and more ==
In 2009 the Leader Community Newspapers interviewed Lord in an article titled "Art Show Brings Back Yesterday to Yarraville"

In 2010 his work was featured in the exhibition Upgrade/Downgrade, at Open Concept Gallery, Michigan, USA.

Many shows followed such as Paradise Hills First Birthday (2011) and Do Electric Sheep Follow the Digital Herd (2011, at Melbourne's Gasworks Arts Park), and Melbourne's Burning: Paradise Hills (2012), which Lord curated. Stylist Lucy Feagins' article at The Design Files on David and Lolly's showroom-cum-home Codename Tom, also features Lord's work We’re New, We’re Retro'. A list of further shows (to 2016) can be found at the Saatchi Art website.

Lord's solo exhibition in 2014, This Used to Be the Future, was held at D11@Docklands art gallery in Melbourne. Using mainly acrylic house paint on board, his paintings focused on the theme of Future History. The exhibition featured 50 of Lord's works.

On Saturday, 15 October 2016, Josh Lord opened his new exhibition "Newspeak and Thoughtcrimes" at Ministry of Art, St Kilda." The exhibition featured the industrial rock band Kollaps, and Melbourne underground veterans Ollie Olsen and Ash Wednesday played against a video backdrop. Lord was quoted

When there are no checks and balances to the advancement of the business-is-all, ‘greed is good’ crowd, then greed is an ideal in itself, encouraging a disregard of responsibility because personal accountability is lost, because ‘personal accountability’ is now just a buzzphrase. As a consequence, we lose what communities we did have, and we become isolated individuals twitting away, thinking we’re part of something when really … well, have you ever seen a really huge shoal of fish moving, shifting direction..? Yeah.

Also during 2016, Lord produced cover artwork for Ollie Olsen's band Taipan Tiger Girls 2 LP, Harry Howard and the NDE's LP Sleepless Girls. He has also produced artwork for Frankie Teardrop Dead's LP Plane Eclipse, and two Hugo Race LPs, and StarBirth/ StarDeath (2020), and Dishee (2021).

Josh Lord was one of the feature artists at BSIDE Gallery's "FUCK 2020" exhibition in December 2020, which was followed by the same gallery's 'Phase III' exhibition with Alex Meagher and Will Coles from 26 February 2021.
