= Black Chrome =

Australian punk band

- Origin: Adelaide, South Australia, Australia
- Genres: Australian punk
- Years active: 1975–present
- Labels: Tomorrow Records
- Members: Simon Stretton

Black Chrome is an Australian punk band from Adelaide, South Australia, believed to be the first punk band in the city. Formed in 1975 by Simon Stretton, Simon Dillon, and Andrew Griffiths, they were ignored by radio presenters, but released the single "Australia's God"/"We Are Tomorrow" on Stretton's label Tomorrow Records in 1978. The Internet revived interest in the band around 2000, and they became regarded as a cult band. They reformed in 2010 and as of December 2024 continue to play punk. They released the album Age of Rage in 2018. Stretton had a career as a judge before retiring in May 2024.

== History ==
=== Early days ===
Black Chrome first formed in 1975, credited as being the first punk/new wave band in Adelaide. It then consisted of Simon Stretton on vocals and guitar; Simon Dillon on bass guitar; and Andrew Griffiths on drums. Andrew's younger brother Alan joined the band as the main vocalist, allowing Stretton to concentrate fully on playing guitar. They were the first punk band in Adelaide, and were at first vilified and ignored by radio presenters such as Bob Francis. Venues were not keen on hosting the band, so they had to lie in order to get a booking. They were however welcomed at a hippy festival held in the Adelaide Hills.

After the ABC TV current affairs program This Day Tonight travelled to Adelaide in 1977 to interview the band, as well as radio presenter Bob Francis, who, according to Stretton, had a vendetta against them, and the program was aired nationally, it caused them to break up. Stretton drove across the continent to radio stations in Sydney, Melbourne, and Brisbane to try to get airplay, but did not succeed, and he returned, dejected.

In 1978, the band released the single "Australia's God"/"We Are Tomorrow". "Australia's God", according to Stretton, was "a protest song about Australia's bereft culture".

=== Revival ===
Around 2000, after a resurgence of interest driven by the Internet, Black Chrome became a cult band, and venues wanted to book them to play. The publication of early punk discographies also had an impact. Black Chrome reformed in 2010.

In the week ending 11 December 2015, an unnamed "2 song CD" leapt into 1st place on local community radio station Three D Radio's "Top 20 + 1", having not featured in the preceding week's list.

They have appeared on live punk compilation albums, including:

- Pioneers of Punk - Live at the Ed Castle (2014), Tomorrow Records – vinyl and CD
- DNA Fanzine Gig!!! Hotel Metro Adelaide, 25 January 2020 Live!!! (2021) - Tomorrow records – vinyl and CD

Since 2018 Black Chrome have released new material, including:

- Age of Rage (2018, album), Tomorrow Records - vinyl and CD, 31 August 2018
- Hard Times Party (2020, EP), Tomorrow Records - 10" vinyl and CD, 1 January 2021
- "The Storm" (2020, single)
- "Scared White Man" (single, 2020)

Hard Times Party has six tracks, was issued on white vinyl, and its copyright note has the year 1981 crossed through and replaced with 2020.

Stretton announced in November 2024 that the band's latest project was taking "appalling songs in history and fixing them by playing them in punk". The first release of this project is based on the 1977 song Living Next Door to Alice", originally released by pop band New World in 1972.

== Members ==
Members have included:

- Alan Griffiths – vocals
- Simon Stretton – vocals, guitar
- Simon Dillon – bass
- Andrew Griffiths – drums
- Mike Flash – bass (joined 1978)
- Tony Techno – drums (joined 1978)

== Tomorrow Records ==
Tomorrow Records was founded and is owned by Simon Stretton. The record label has been releasing records by Black Chrome, sometimes including other bands or musicians (including Adelaide band Fear and Loathing, and a track by Bohdan X), since 1978. Stretton started recording many bands live, using borrowed recording equipment, often using the back of a 1962 VW Kombi. Apart from Black Chrome, he recorded many early punk bands, including JAB, The Chosen Few, Bohdan X, The Accountants, The U-Bombs, The Dagoes, Psychosurgeons, the Lipstick Killers, Riff-Raff, and Young Modern. Later the label recorded Perdition, CULL the Band, Fear and Loathing, Ben Gel's Shitshow, Teenage Crime, and others. In some cases, they are the only audio record of the band.

== Recognition ==
Two of Black Chrome's songs, "There is no meaning" and "We are tomorrow", featured on the album Bijou Noblesse Oblige: Bands From The Bijou Era; Underground Adelaide Music From the 1970s in 2001. The album was a compilation of songs by the Adelaide musicians who performed at the Bijou concert series in the 1970s, after they reunited for a CD launch and concert. An accompanying film, produced by Patrick O'Grady, documents the Bijou performances. "Fighting in the Streets" was featured in a 2022 episode of the Radio National program The Music Show in which Andrew Ford interviewed filmmaker Jennifer Ross, maker of the documentary feature Age of Rage: The Australian Punk Revolution, the title taken from Black Chrome's 2018 album Age of Rage.

In July 2020, Triple J Unearthed featured the band's single "The Storm", calling them a "pioneering Australian punk band", and likening their music to The Ramones, Sex Pistols, The Stooges, Green Day, Midnight Oil, and the Sex Pistols.

== Other careers ==
Simon Stretton is the son of historian, social commentator, and writer Hugh Stretton, and his wife Pat. He has brothers Fabian and Tim, and sister Sally Driden. He studied law, became a lawyer, and with Michael Abbott (later QC), established Wellington Chambers, renamed Market Street Chambers in 1986. From 2004 until 2010 Stretton was Crown Solicitor of South Australia. He was appointed judge in the District Court of South Australia on 4 February 2010, known as Judge Stretton. He retired in May 2024.

Drummer Andrew Griffiths formed and played in a number of Adelaide rock bands, such as Squawk, Matriark, and Sidewinder. He joined The Dagoes between 1983 and 1984. He played in Out of the Blue (later Rogue Torpedo) in Sydney from 1987 to 1992, when he returned to Adelaide. After playing in a number of bands with breaks in between, in 2022 his band Looking Out For Lilly released their debut album. He published Progressive Rock Drumming, a lesson-by-lesson guide teaching how to play drums in a group, and established his business Frets and Stix Music in 1992. As of 2024 the business is still operational, selling musical instruments and offering guitar and drum lessons.
