= JAB =

Australian punk rock band

- Origin: Adelaide, South Australia, Australia
- Genres: Experimental rock; Art rock; Electropunk
- Years active: 1976–1978
- Label: Suicide Records
- Past members: Ash Wednesday; Bohdan X; Boris; Janis Friedenfelds; Bob Stopa; Peter Sutcliffe

JAB were an Australian punk rock band, which formed in Adelaide in 1976. The original line-up was Johnny Crash (a.k.a. Janis Friedenfelds) on drums and vocals, Ash Wednesday on bass guitar, synthesiser and tapes, and Bohdan X (a.k.a. Bodhan Kubiakowski) on guitar and vocals. Johnny Crash died on 24 January 2014.

== History ==
JAB's name is an initialism of its founding members' first names: Johnny Crash (a.k.a. Janis Friedenfelds) on drums and vocals, Ash Wednesday on bass guitar, synthesiser and tapes, Bohdan X (a.k.a. Bodhan Kubiakowski) on guitar and vocals, and Boris on guitar. They started in Adelaide in 1976 as an experimental group, "taking inspiration from the likes of Eno, David Bowie and certain German electronic artists such as Kraftwerk, Neu!, Faust and Can."

In 1977 Bob Stopa replaced Boris as second guitarist. JAB defied strict categorisation and split audiences with their abrasive sound. Adelaide's music press described their sound as "synthetic shock rock"; with one contemporary critic opining that it was "experimental, confrontational synthpunk." Australian musicologist, Ian McFarlane, felt they adopted "a brasher punk stance... part of the... new wave scene."

JAB relocated to Melbourne in August 1977 joining the punk scene and playing alongside the Boys Next Door and X-Ray-Z. Bohdan later recalled, "They were very exciting times, we were changing the face of the music scene and we all knew it. .... All the bands on the scene just kind of found each other. Usually it was through playing together at places like the Tiger Lounge in Richmond, Bombay Rock in Brunswick and of course Bananas down in St Kilda."

JAB signed to Suicide Records in January 1978 and two of their tracks, "Blonde and Bombed" and "Let's Go", were included on the label's compilation album by various artists, Lethal Weapons. In May Pierre Voltaire (a.k.a. Peter Sutcliffe or Pierre Sutcliffe) (ex-Teenage Radio Stars) joined on bass guitar, allowing Wednesday to concentrate on keyboards. The band played their final show in August 1978 at the Crystal Ballroom (then known as the Seaview Ballroom), which was also the first gig ever played at that venue. JAB were later recognised as one of the first Australian bands to combine electronica with a punk aesthetic and hard-edged guitar sound.

Bohdan X joined members of the Chosen Few to form Bohdan and the Instigators. He later issued solo records, including a four-track, 12-inch extended play, Fear of Flying, on Rumour Records in December 1983 and the mini-album, Kingsnake on Rampant Records in 1988. He later hosted a show on the community radio station, 3RRR-FM.

Wednesday, Crash and Sutcliffe joined Sean Kelly (ex-Teenage Radio Stars) to form the first line-up of Models. Sutcliffe was replaced on bass guitar after six months. He won $503,000 in May 2014, on Australian TV quiz show, Million Dollar Minute. Wednesday stayed with Models for a year, after which he played with the Metronomes, Modern Jazz and Crashland. He issued a solo single in 1980, "Love by Numbers"/"Boring Instrumental", and became a touring member with the German band, Einstürzende Neubauten. Crash left Models in 1981 and went on to play with Sacred Cowboys (1982–85), Beasts of Bourbon (1983), the Slaughtermen (1984) and Tombstone Hands. Johnny Crash (Janis Friedenfelds) died on 24 January 2014.

== See also ==
- Black Chrome
