= The Survivors (Australian band) =

Australian punk rock band

- Origin: Brisbane, Queensland, Australia
- Genres: Punk rock, Garage punk
- Years active: 1976–1978
- Labels: Real, Suicide, Grown Up Wrong
- Past members: Greg Williamson; Jim Dickson; Bruce Anthon

The Survivors were an Australian punk rock band that originally formed in Brisbane, Queensland, Australia, in 1976 as Rat Salad, a party band. The Survivors attained cult status in Australia by their acknowledged popular live performances and contribution to the Lethal Weapons punk compilation album. Original band members were Greg Williamson on guitar and vocals, Jim Dickson on bass guitar and vocals, Bruce Anthon on drums and vocals. David Nichols, from the Mess And Noise website, commented that, "The Survivors were legends in their home town of Brisbane, a highly popular and adept band whose sets were mainly cool '60s covers."

The Survivors were a group behind Brisbane's original punk scene during 1976 to 1977. According to music historian, Ian McFarlane, Brisbane produced "some of the most anarchistic bands of the Australian punk rock era and that it was a city nationally renowned for its ultra conservatism." The band released one single called "Baby Come Back", on the Real label in 1977, which was later reissued on the Suicide label in 1978. A live vinyl album called Worse than Perfect was released in 1988.

== History ==
The Survivors, a southern suburbs Brisbane band, had a mutual admiration for 1960s music but originally they named their band Rat Salad after the Black Sabbath song. They changed their name in 1977 to The Survivors still mostly playing parties or occasionally hiring a hall, where they had to "watch out for the noise vigilant cops", "until the Curry Shop venue began supporting local punk acts in the heart of Brisbane on Sundays."

Whilst known for their energetic versions of other group’s songs, they managed to release one stamped sleeve seven inch single on the Real label. The A-side Baby Come Back flirted with 1960s music but also had a strong stylistic sense of original New York City punk. They encountered condemnation from punk circles for being to close to Sixties covers music as Jim Dickson recounts, "Criticism was often levelled at the Survivors for their lack of original material. The band were able to exist in those punksnobbery times because their energy was equal to anyone's and purely dedicated to the music which transcended the transient social commitments of the time."

Mushroom Records subsidiary label Suicide Records reissued the seven inch single and added both songs onto the Lethal Weapons compilation album in 1978. This was the extent of their output when they were still in existence. The band broke up in late 1978 but did manage to do shows in Sydney later on including a show with The Visitors. The band members Jim Dickson and Bruce Anthon formed The Sleepers and then The Shakers.

In 1979 Jim Dickson went on to record with Sydney act The Passengers, whose singer was Angie Pepper later known for The Angie Pepper Band and the single Frozen World. Jim Dickson also went on to play for profile bands that included The Barracudas, The Deniz Tek Group and Radio Birdman amongst many others. According to Jim Dickson, "Bruce and Greg had been busy in '79 with the Credits, who recorded a single, It's You / Fazed Dazed, for the Rocking Horse Record Shop label". Drummer, Bruce Anthon, went on to play with numerous other groups, including bands that played jazz or blues. He worked at Brisbane record store Kent Records through the 1980s up to the mid-90s when it closed.

== Legacy ==
In 1988 the band managed to retrospectively release an album recorded live in August 1978 at the Rex Hotel, Kings Cross, Sydney, called Worse than Perfect. The original recording of Baby Come Back had also been included as part of the 2015 CD Compilation called "Stranded, The Chronicles of Australian Punk". This CD was a wide retrospective of Australian punk, officially released by the Australian Broadcasting Corporation's Four by Four label.

== Personnel ==
- Bruce Anthon – Drums, vocals
- Jim Dickson – Bass, vocals
- Greg Williamson – Guitar, vocals

== Discography ==
=== Albums ===
- Worse Than Perfect

1988 - Grown Up Wrong – WRONG3

=== Singles ===
- "Baby Come Back" / "Mr Record Man" – 7 inch 1977, Real – RR100
- "Baby Come Back" / "Mr. Record Man" – 7 inch 1978, Suicide – 103181
