= The Mungabeans =

Australian musical group

The Mungabeans were a Brisbane, Australia indie rock band. They formed in 1984, broke up in 1992. The band comprised guitarist/singer-songwriter Paul Grogan, bass player/vocalist Guy Mansfield and drummer/producer, Lord Mike McCann. Evan Clarry, now a feature filmmaker, was rhythm guitarist and occasional vocalist from 1984 to 1987. The Mungabeans - or The ‘Beans, as their fans called them - were known for an eclectic repertoire and bizarre stage show, which was comedy, high art or menace, depending on the audience’s perception. The band moved to Sydney in 1986, after becoming the only performers to be banned from Brisbane’s then alternative radio station, Four Triple Z.

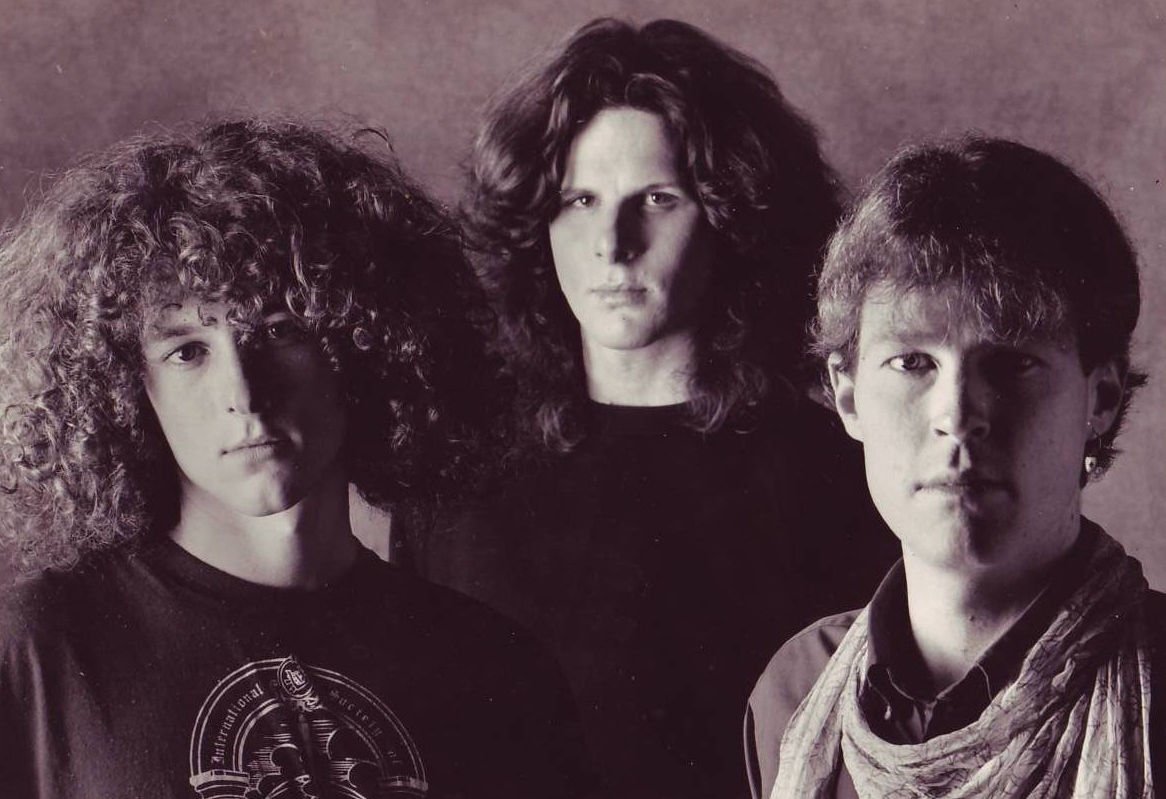
The 'Beans circa 1987, from left Mansfield, Grogan and McCann

== History, name ==
The ‘Beans began as an impromptu fill-in at Jabbo’s Jazz and Blues Club (situated in what is now a Roma Street carpark) in 1983, when regular Saturday night act, The Headstones, took breaks. A series of drummers joined childhood friends Grogan and Mansfield on stage, until Jabbo’s regular Mike McCann was permanently recruited. Clarry, who was Mansfield’s classmate at Church of England Grammar School, joined from the first official gig. The Headstones' leader, Chris Flynn (later of The Dubrovniks), suggested the act name themselves after things called "mungabeans" (sic) that he'd seen at a health food shop. Bean sprouts were uncommon in Brisbane; no-one recognised the error in the name, nor the association with hippies, so posters were printed with the erroneous name which stuck.

The ‘Beans performed regularly at Brisbane’s "underground" venues throughout 1985 and ’86, progressing from support to headline act largely on the strength of a bizarre stage show and repertoire. As a film student, guitarist Evan Clarry had access to elaborate cinematic props, which embellished the simulated sex and violence characterising Beans’ gigs. And, while the theatre was often tongue-in-cheek, perceptions of subversiveness in a conservative, heavily policed Brisbane led to undercover police often infiltrating Mungabeans’ gigs. The band’s early repertoire was dominated by covers of kitsch glam and Australian rock songs of the early 1970s, largely to irritate elements of the self-conscious underground music set who reviled the material. Over time, Grogan’s compositions replaced the covers, as the band became more ambitious.

Interest in Sydney led to the band moving there in 1986 (as had The Headstones, Screaming Tribesmen, Ups & Downs and others).

Like many Australian independent acts of the 1980s, The Mungabeans gained more popularity overseas than in their own backyard. In their case Germany and England took to the band, however the 'Beans never toured outside Australia. They split in 1990, reforming in 1991 as Undermine, before splitting for good in 1992.

High points of recognition in Australia were multiple appearances on Rage and regular airplay in 1988 of The Beans' song Too Late (to Turn Back Now) from their debut EP, A Much Sweeter Gag.

== Legacy ==
The 'Beans were considered instrumental in introducing a less self-conscious culture among the so-called Brisbane "underground". In a 1986 article published in RAM (Rock Australia Magazine), the band was cited as influential on a wave of ex-Brisbane performers who succeeded internationally as independent and mainstream music markets merged in the late 1980s. The 'Beans paved the way for a new wave of young bands, who eschewed taking themselves seriously. Grogan and Mansfield, as professional musicians with experience in working covers bands, also helped bridge a cultural divide between proficient suburban cabaret bands and the raw, three-chord approach of "indie" acts. This contributed to a mark-up in musical skill among original bands emerging in Brisbane from the early 1990s. The 'Beans' records sales were highest in Europe.

Grogan and McCann formed World Dog in 1994, recording a CD produced by Skyhooks songwriter Greg Macainsh. McCann and Grogan now develop music for Asian markets through their production company, GroMic, while Clarry is a director with two feature films to his name, Blurred (film) and Under the Radar (film). He currently works in TV. Mansfield is an occasional TV producer, and runs a corporate video agency.

== Discography ==
LPs

- A Much Sweeter Gag (Au Go Go) 1988

Singles

- Expensive Taste (Sundown) 1986 (Produced by Mike McCann and written by Paul Grogan)

Compilation Tracks

- "Too Late To Turn Back Now" on Urban Sounds 1994
- "It’s Gone" on Brisbane Overboard 1996

The Mungabeans and Undermine on YouTube:

It's Gone, 1989, studio version and official video clip: https://www.youtube.com/watch?v=uZ-qHZgjC6Y

Cosmic Egg - through the ages: https://www.youtube.com/watch?v=mE2jB0W_jdk

Fire, live at Treasury Hotel, 1990: https://www.youtube.com/watch?v=_u5p8y_q4z0

I Won't Take That (AKA Lord Mike's Rap), 1990: https://www.youtube.com/watch?v=EpobFZ-7mgE

About To Set Me Free, 1986: https://www.youtube.com/watch?v=GFvVWcqP9uc
