= Sacred Cowboys =

Australian post-punk band

- Origin: Melbourne, Victoria, Australia
- Genres: Rock, post-punk
- Years active: 1982–1985, 1987–1991, 1994–1997, 2006–2008
- Labels: White, Mushroom, New Rose, Festival, Man Made, Citadel, Siren, Greasy Pole, Shock, Bang!, Torn & Frayed
- Members: Mark Ferrie; Garry Gray; Timothy Deane; Anthony Paine; Damian FitzGerald
- Past members: Terry Doolan; Janis Friedenfelds (aka Johnny Crash); Ian Forrest; Andrew Picouleau; Chris Whelan; Nick Rischbieth; Stephan Fidock; Ash Wednesday; Penny Ikinger; Spencer P. Jones
- Website: sacredcowboys.com.au

Sacred Cowboys were an Australian post-punk and rock band formed by mainstay Garry Gray, as a lead singer-songwriter, and Mark Ferrie in 1982. The line-up has changed as the group splintered and reformed several times, being active from 1982 to 1985, 1987 to 1991, 1994 to 1997 and 2006 to 2008. The August 2006 line-up was Gray with Stephan Fidock on drums; Penny Ikinger on guitar; Spencer P. Jones on guitar; Nick Rischbieth on bass guitar; and Ash Wednesday on keyboards. Past members include: Johnny Crash (aka Janis Friedenfelds) on drums and Mark Ferrie on bass guitar, who were both ex-Models; Terry Doolan on guitar; Andrew Picouleau on bass guitar; and Ian Forrest on keyboards.

The group have issued seven albums: Sacred Cowboys (1984), We Love You ... Of Course We Do (1985), Trouble from Providence (August 1988), Things to Come (July 1996), Cold Harvest (January 2007), 1982–85: Nailed to the Cross (February 2008) and In the Manifesto (March 2026). Australian musicologist Ian McFarlane described them as "one of the most confrontational live outfits" with their music as "mixed post-punk moodiness and country raunch over a mutant swamp-blues backbeat".

== History ==
Sacred Cowboys formed in early 1982 in Melbourne with Terry Doolan on guitar (ex-Fizztops), Janis Friedenfelds (aka Johnny Crash) on drums, Mark Ferrie on guitar (both ex-Models), Ian Forrest on keyboards (ex-True Wheels), Garry Gray on lead vocals (ex-The Reals, The Negatives) and Andrew Picouleau on bass guitar (ex-Metronomes, Popgun Men, X-Ray-Z). Gray and Ferrie based the name from watching "The Groovy Guru", an episode of the US TV comedy series, Get Smart. In it, the Groovy Guru and his rock band, the Sacred Cows, use psychedelic music to control the minds of young people. Initially the group were a covers band playing Creedence Clearwater Revival, Alex Chilton, The Velvet Underground, Captain Beefheart, Suicide and Bob Dylan. They built a reputation as "one of the most confrontational live outfits" in the local scene.

Within six months, Sacred Cowboys had signed with Mushroom Records' White Label and recorded a single, "Nothing Grows in Texas", which appeared in November 1982. After a performance on TV pop show, Countdown, the host Molly Meldrum described them as "the worst group I've seen in five years", a title the band knew meant they were on the right side of the wrong side of the tracks. Gray responded with "[Meldrum] had a very good medium at his disposal but he never really used it to benefit the broad spectrum of music that was available in the country". According to Australian musicologist, Ian McFarlane, Meldrum's assessment had "instantly cemented their nefarious reputation as the local scene's enfants terribles. The band's music mixed post-punk moodiness and country raunch over a mutant swamp-blues backbeat". In July 1983 they released a second single, a cover of Chilton's "Bangkok". In the next month they supported US hardcore punk band, Dead Kennedys, at their Melbourne gig.

In December Sacred Cowboys followed with a six-track self-titled extended play on the White Label, which was produced by Tony Cohen (Models, The Birthday Party). At that time Chris Whelan replaced Forrest on keyboards. Early in the next year, a self-titled album on French label, New Rose Records, was issued. Meanwhile, Nick Rischbieth (ex-Related Mechanics) replaced Picouleau on bass guitar and at the same time the band decided to work without keyboards. In 1985 a live, demo compilation, We Love You . . . Of Course We Do, named after a cover of The Rolling Stones single, "We Love You", appeared on Man Made Records. However, by that time the group went off the road and Gray entered a drug rehabilitation centre to treat his heroin addiction. In August 1988 he declared that the treatment was "not easy for anyone but the benefit is to be able to come out and continue working and I had to work better than I have before... not a lot of people can get through that sort of thing... Writing is something I've always enjoyed but now it's a more positive thing". Late in 1984 Ferrie and Friedenfelds formed The Slaughtermen, as a post-punk, alternative, southern gospel group.

Late in 1987 Sacred Cowboys reformed with a line-up of Doolan, Ferrie, Gray and Rischbieth joined by Stephan Fidock on drums (ex-The Reels). Ash Wednesday briefly joined on keyboards (ex-JAB, Metronomes, Einsturzende Neubauten) but left after recording the album, Trouble from Providence. They signed to Sydney-based label, Citadel Records, which released the album in August 1988. It was produced by Ferrie, Doolan, Cohen, and Martin Armiger (Paul Kelly & the Dots, Stephen Cummings). McFarlane described it as "one of the best independent releases of the year". It was also issued by Germany's Normal Records, both in the standard nine-track vinyl LP format and as a CD with six bonus tracks. The band issued two singles from the album, the title track in July and "Hell Sucks" in December. The latter was more popular and became the group's signature tune. Forrest rejoined on keyboards, late in 1990, but the group disbanded again at the end of the following year.

From early 1994 Sacred Cowboys reformed with a line-up of Doolan, Ferrie, Fidock and Gray, joined by Spencer P Jones, then Penny Ikinger on guitar (ex-Wet Taxis, Louis Tillett's Aspersion Caste). They released a compilation CD, seven-track EP, Black City, early that year on the Siren label. In 1997 the Australian edition of Rolling Stone listed it as one of the Top 100 albums of the 20th century. Another album, Things to Come, was released in July 1996. It was recorded at Atlantis and Espy Studios for Greasy Pole Records and distributed by Shock Records. By that time Spencer P. Jones had joined on guitar (ex-Beasts of Bourbon, Paul Kelly & the Coloured Girls). At various times Sydney-based alternative rock, blues rock band, Beasts of Bourbon, has included Doolan, Ferrie, Friedenfelds or Jones of Sacred Cowboys. By 1997 Sacred Cowboys had gone off the road again, Gray moved to France and was living in Montpellier.

In 2005 "Hell Sucks" was selected for Clinton Walker's compilation of Australian punk and post-punk music, Inner City Sounds. Sacred Cowboys reformed in August 2006 with the line-up of Fidock, Gray, Ikinger, Jones, Rischbieth and Wednesday and in 2008 with Mark Ferrie. They played a series of shows in Melbourne, and the remaining line-up recorded the finishing touches to the album, Cold Harvest, which was released on Bang! Records in January 2007. TJ Honeysuckle at i94bar.com noted that Ikinger and Jones were "hugely distinctive presences here" while Gray's vocal delivery "swings easily from snarling to caressing – he has a snake oil seller's charm at times, a cursing preacher's tone at others". Radio station, PBS 106.7FM's review described the album "the songs are narrative in style, a kind of urban uprising driven by dysfunctional dreamers and powerless onlookers". In February 2008 they issued a compilation album, 1982–85: Nailed to the Cross. Amazon's editorial review recalls their early style, "[they] played a wild, dangerous and completely unique brand of rock'n'roll inspired by the artists whose material they cover". The group toured in support of the release until August that year.

The band reformed in 2025 and released their album In the Manifesto in 2026.

== Members ==
- Garry Gray – vocals (1982–1985, 1987–1991, 1994–1997, 2006–2008, 2025-present)
- Terry Doolan – guitars, backing vocals, keyboards (1982–1985, 1987–1991, 1994–1997)
- Mark Ferrie – guitars, backing vocals (1982–1985, 1987–1991, 1994–1997, 2008), bass (1994–1997, 2008, 2025-present)
- Ian Forrest – keyboards (1982–1983, 1990–1991)
- Andrew Picouleau – bass (1982–1984) (deceased)
- Janis Friedenfelds (aka Johnny Crash) – drums (1982–1985) (deceased)
- Chris Whelan – keyboards (1983)
- Nick Rischbieth – bass (1984–1985, 1987–1991, 1994–1997, 2006–2008)
- Stephan Fidock – drums (1987–1991, 1994–1997, 2006–2008) (deceased)
- Ash Wednesday – keyboards (1987, 2006)
- Penny Ikinger – guitars, backing vocals (1994–1997, 2006–2008)
- Spencer P. Jones – guitars, backing vocals (1992–1995, 2006–2008) (deceased)
- Timothy Deane;– guitars, backing vocals (2025-present)
- Anthony Paine;– bass, backing vocals (2025-present)
- Damian FitzGerald;– drums, backing vocals (2025-present)

== Discography ==
=== Albums ===
- Sacred Cowboys – (1984)
- We Love You...Of Course We Do – (1985)
- Trouble from Providence – (August 1988)
- Things to Come – (July 1996)
- Cold Harvest – (January 2007)
- 1982–85: Nailed to the Cross – (February 2008)
- In the Manifesto – (March 2026)

=== Extended plays ===
- Sacred Cowboys – (1983)
- Black City – (1994)

=== Singles ===
- "Nothing Grows in Texas" – (1982)
- "Bangkok" – (1983)
- "Twisted Nerve" – (1983)
- "Trouble from Providence" – (1988)
- "Hell Sucks" – (1990)
- "Black City" – (1994)
- "Drop by Drop" – (1997)
