= 09-15-2000, Brussels =

Album by Einstürzende Neubauten

Live album by Einstürzende Neubauten
- Released: 2002
- Recorded: 15 September 2000
- Genre: Experimental music
- Length: 125:54
- Label: Caroline
- Producer: Einstürzende Neubauten

09-15-2000, Brussels is a live album by the German avant-garde/experimental band Einstürzende Neubauten and was released in 2002.

== Track listing ==
All tracks are written by Einstürzende Neubauten

Disc One
No.	Title	Length
1.	"Silence Is Sexy"	6:41
2.	"Sabrina"	5:26
3.	"Dingsaller"	5:06
4.	"Die Interimsliebenden"	6:37
5.	"NNNAAAMMM"	9:06
6.	"Haus der Luge"	3:57
7.	"Zebulon"	4:07
8.	"Newton's Gravitatlichkeit"	2:46
9.	"Zampano"	5:17
10.	"Ein Seltener Vogel"	7:21
11.	"Beauty"	2:34
12.	"Die Befindlichkeit des Landes"	5:31
13.	"Sonnenbarke"	9:03

Disc Two
No.	Title	Length
1.	"Der Schacht Von Babel"	5:11
2.	"Redukt"	10:10
3.	"Jubel"	2:15
4.	"Musentango"	2:40
5.	"Alles"	5:53
6.	"Ende Neu"	8:06
7.	"Yu Gung"	6:56
8.	"Installation No. 1"	6:39
9.	"Salamandrina"	4:32

== Personnel ==
Einstürzende Neubauten

- Blixa Bargeld – lead vocals, guitar, keyboards.
- Alexander Hacke – bass, guitar, vocals.
- N.U. Unruh – special built instruments, percussion, vocals.
- Jochen Arbeit – guitar, vocals.
- Rudi Moser – special built instruments, percussion, vocals.

== Notes ==
Ein Seltener Vogel had never been played before this show, and "would probably never be played again", according to Blixa Bargeld during its performance. The song would later turn up on the band's 2004 album Perpetuum Mobile.
