= Lethal Weapons (album) =

Compilation album by various artists
- Released: 1978
- Label: Suicide Records

Lethal Weapons is a compilation album of songs recorded for Suicide Records. It was released in May 1978 and reissued on Mushroom's White Records in 1983. Aztec Music reissued it on CD in 2007 with new liner notes from Ian McFarlane and Glenn Terry. It was put together by Suicide's Barry Earl, alongside Mushroom's Michael Gudinski, who brought Melbourne based punk bands into the studio. It features early recording from artists who would go on to greater success with other bands. Jeremy Templer in New Zealand's Rip It Up wrote "this album will be a valuable artifact within five year, or will still be a party joke."

Reviewing the 2007 reissue Noel Mengel in the Courier Mail said "″Mixed bag″ isn't quite strong enough to describe this curiosity from the early years of Australian punk, originally released on white vinyl. It ranges from interesting artefacts -- pre-Models Sean Kelly and James Freud in Teenage Radio Stars, pre-Birthday Party Nick Cave and Mick Harvey and friends in Boys Next Door -- to garage rock gems (The Survivors) to the just plain terrible." Record Collector magazine said "The main selling point is The Boys Next Door" stating "As a first studio foray, this album is at least vital to Cave followers."

== Album track listing ==
1. Wanna Be Ya Baby - Teenage Radio Stars
2. Learned One - Teenage Radio Stars
3. Roadrunner - Wasted Daze
4. Mona - Wasted Daze
5. Let's Go - JAB
6. Blonde And Bombed - JAB
7. Baby Come Back - The Survivors
8. Mr. Record Man - The Survivors
9. These Boots Are Made For Walking - The Boys Next Door
10. Masturbation Generation - The Boys Next Door
11. Boy Hero - The Boys Next Door
12. Planet On The Prowl - The Negatives
13. Three Glorious Years - X-Ray-Z
14. Valium - X-Ray-Z
15. Sweet Boredom - Teenage Radio Stars
