= The Leftovers (Australian band) =

Australian punk rock band

- Origin: Brisbane, Queensland, Australia
- Genres: Punk rock
- Years active: 1976–1979, 1983, 2012–present
- Labels: Punji Stick, Dropkick
- Members: Ed Wreckage; Graeme 'Hutch' Hutchinson; Michael Gilmore; Ché Wreckage
- Past members: Warren Lamond; Jim Shoebridge; Peter Cornilsen; Glenn Smith; Graeme 'Hutch' Hutchinson; Ed Wreckage; Michael Hiron; Johnny 'Burnaway' Gorman; Greg Wackley; David 'Dodo' Donald; Mal "Malcontent' Skewis
- Website: The Leftovers

The Leftovers is an Australian punk rock band which formed in 1976 in Brisbane, Queensland, Australia. Original band members were Warren Lamond on vocals, Ed Wreckage on guitar, Jim Shoebridge on guitar, Glenn Smith on bass guitar and Graeme 'Hutch' Hutchinson on drums. Constant members of the original band (1976–1979) were Lamond and Smith, whilst other members were replaced at various times by a host of others including Michael Hiron, Johnny 'Burnaway' Gorman, Mal ' Malcontent' Skewis, David 'Dodo'Donald and Ed Wreckage's son, Ché Wreckage, who joined the group in 2012 along with Michael Gilmore. The group existed from 1976 to 1979 with reformations in 1983 and 2012.

According to music historian, Ian McFarlane, Brisbane produced "some of the most anarchistic bands of the Australian punk rock era" and that it was a city nationally renowned for its ultra conservatism. Ian McFarlane also mentioned the group's first and only single, which was released in 1979 and rates it as "one of the classics of the late 1970s Australian punk rock era."

The Leftovers had acquired local cult punk hero status in Australia over the years due to their acknowledged reputation in the past for excessive anti social practices, constant harassment by the Queensland Police Force and self-destructive deeds. Their musical style fitted the generic conventions of punk but they also paid live homage to earlier proto–punk influences such as Lou Reed and Patti Smith.

== History ==
Originally from Sandgate, Queensland, The Leftovers Formed in 1976. Beginning in parallel to The Saints from Brisbane's southside, The Leftovers mostly played shows in suburban halls and practice rooms. In the conservative climate of late 1970s Brisbane, punk concerts were not looked upon fondly, and The Leftovers shows often ended with a heavy-handed response from the local police. "Many Leftover gigs were never finished – police would often pull the plug before they had a chance to get through a full set", The Leftovers had been quoted as saying. Chris Spencer, compiler for the Who's Who of Australian Rock, commented that they "Embodied the image of what Brisbane's visualisation of 'punk' was all about. Raw, energetic and anti social and everything else that made the era fun, they captured the attention of fans, neighbours and the police.; The band released one seven-inch E.P. in 1979. The A-side, "Cigarettes and Alcohol" is considered an Australian punk "classic".

The band started out with members Warren Lamond on vocals, Jim Shoebridge on guitar, Glenn Smith on bass and Graeme 'Hutch' Hutchinson on drums but also had a plethora of other musicians filling in vacant roles. They included at various times Michael Hiron on drums, Johnny 'Burnaway' Gorman on guitar and Ed Wreckage, firstly on drums and then guitar. Some of these members went on to join The Riptides and The Pineapples from the Dawn of Time at various times.

The group disbanded in 1979, Lamond and Wreckage going on to form the Temporary Ornaments. After the split, according to Ian McFarlane, a string of tragedies occurred from the band's ex-members that included suicide attempts (Warren Lamond), prison (Ed Wreckage) and premature deaths. The group members who have died since are Warren Lamond, Glenn Smith, Michael Hiron, Johnny 'Burnaway' Gorman and Jim Shoebridge.

In 1985, they reformed for one live show featuring Warren Lamond on vocals, Ed Wreckage on guitar, Michael Hiron on bass and David Donald on drums. In 2012, the band reformed for a show called "Return to White Chairs", which featured various other local bands from the late 1970s to early 1980s. The Leftovers' line-up for this show was Ed Wreckage on guitar, Graeme Hutchinson on percussion, Michael Gilmore on vocals and Ché Wreckage on bass. The current line-up have continued playing live shows in Brisbane.

== Legacy ==
In 2003 a retrospective CD of Leftovers was released called The Fucken Leftovers Hate You was released by Dropkick Records as well as a re-issue of their 1979 vinyl record. The material on the CD included recorded songs including Patti Smith's Hermine and a collection of live recordings. Songs from the original E.P., Cigarettes And Alcohol and I Only Panic When There Is Nothing To Do were included on several Australian CD compilations during the 2000s.

== Personnel ==
- Warren Lamond – vocals (1976–1979, 1985)
- Jim Shoebridge – guitar (1976–1978)
- Peter Cornilsen – bass (1976)
- Glenn Smith – bass (1976–1979)
- Graeme'Hutch' Hutchinson – drums (1976,1978,2012–present)
- Ed Wreckage – drums, guitar (1977–1979, 1985, 2012–2021)
- Michael Hiron – drums, bass (1976–77, 1978, 1985)
- Greg Wackley – drums (1978–1979)
- Johnny 'Burnaway' Gorman – guitar (1976–1977)
- Mal 'Malcontent' Skewis – bass (1979)
- David 'Dodo' Donald – drums (1979,1985)
- Michael Gilmore – vocals (2012–14)
- Ché Wreckage – bass (2012–13)
- Reforming appropriately, for Guy Fawkes celebrations in 2015, the current line up consists of:
- Ed Wreckage – Lead Guitar
- Ché Wreckage – Vocals & Rhythm Guitar
- Graeme 'Hutch' Hutchinson – Drums
- John Downey – Bass

== Discography ==
=== Albums ===
- The Fucken Leftovers Hate You – CD, 2003, Dropkick Records.

=== Extended plays ===
- Cigarettes and Alcohol / I Only Panic When There's Nothing To Do /No Complaints – 7 inch 1979

Punji Stick PRS-26248

- Cigarettes and Alcohol / I Only Panic When There's Nothing To Do /No Complaints – 7 inch 2003, Dropkick Records.
