= The Angie Pepper Band =

- Origin: Sydney, New South Wales, Australia
- Genres: Indie rock
- Labels: Citadel, Career

The Angie Pepper Band was a post-punk band formed in Sydney, Australia.

It was formed around Angie Pepper, who first became prominent as the vocalist of another Sydney band, The Passengers, who released one single ("Face With No Name", 1982) on the Phantom label.

After Pepper married Radio Birdman co-founder Deniz Tek, they played together in the short-lived Angie Pepper Band, whose ranks also included Clyde Bramley (a future Hoodoo Guru) and Ivor Hay (a former drummer in The Saints).

The band was short lived but in 1984 recorded a single called "Frozen World".

In 2001, tracks recorded by The Passengers and the Angie Pepper Band were compiled on an LP and CD called It's Just that I Miss You (Citadel Records).

In 2003, Angie Pepper released Res Ipsa Loquitor on Career Records, her first album of newly recorded material in years. She has been described by Aretha Franklin's producer Arif Mardin as having a "most special voice".

== Personnel ==
- Angie Pepper - vocals
- Deniz Tek - Guitar
- Steve Harris - keyboards
- Ivor Hay - drums
- Clyde Bramley - Bass

== Discography ==
Title	Release
Frozen World 7" single	1984
It's Just That I Miss You CD	2001
Res Ipsa Loquitor CD	2003
