= The Pineapples from the Dawn of Time =

Australian psychedelic punk band

Pineapples from the Dawn of Time
- Origin: Brisbane, Queensland, Australia
- Genres: Punk rock, psychedelic rock
- Years active: 1985–1988, 2000–2018, 2025
- Label: Turkeyneck Records
- Members: Michael Gilmore; John Downie; Robert Lee; Patrick Mahony; James S. Doyle; Dyllon Foley
- Past members: Michael Hiron; Kym Watling; Donat Tahiraj; Brian Menzies; Warren Lamond; Mark Purchess; David Bailee; Tony Milner; Mark Waller; Peter Kroll; Wendy Seary; Mark C. Halstead; Murdoch Noyes; Clem Lukey; Rod McLeod

The Pineapples from the Dawn of Time is an Australian psychedelic punk band that formed in 1985 in Brisbane, Queensland, broke up in 1988, and reconvened in 2000.

== History ==
The band began as a quartet, featuring Michael Gilmore on vocals, Clem Lukey on guitar/vocals, and Rod McLeod on bass and teeth. The fourth "member" was a drum machine of an unknown brand. Lead guitarist Peter Kroll often played with them, eventually becoming part of the band by virtue of always turning up and playing.

Often adorned in ridiculous costumes, and with added members (including real drummer Michael Hiron), the band played around Brisbane between 1985 and 1987 while gaining a cult following due to their on-stage antics and songs about mass murderers, science fiction shows, drugs and songs centering the life and times of 60s counterculture icon Charles Manson. In that time, the Pineapples released the double A side single "Saha/Too Much Acid?" and an LP, Shocker, both of which sold out shortly after their respective launches. Due to the band members varying side-projects, the group began its lengthy hiatus in 1988.

In the year 2000, the band were asked to reform in celebration of Brisbane independent broadcaster 4ZZZ's 25th anniversary. A secret show was performed after the event at the Double Helix art gallery. A year later, Hiron died at his home; a tribute show was organised to commemorate his life and the band assembled a line-up as a tribute to Hiron's musical legacy.

With the encouragement of fans, the band played several shows shortly after Hiron's tribute concert as Pensioners from the Dawn of Time, before settling back to the group's original moniker and playing sporadically through the decade.

The band appeared in July 2007 at the Queensland Music Festival's Pig City event at the University of Queensland in Brisbane, along with The Saints, Regurgitator, Kev Carmody, The Riptides, The Parameters and an impromptu performance by the Black Assassins. Shortly after this event, Turkeyneck Records re-released their album Shocker on CD.

Bassist and founding member Rod McLeod died on 12th December, 2023.

In 2025, it was announced that the band would reform for a one-off performance in November to celebrate the 50th anniversary of 4ZZZ. This performance will serve as a tribute to McLeod, and past member John Downie will take his place on bass guitar.
