= Out of the Unknown: Brisbane Bands 1976–1988 =

1988 guidebook on rock bands from Brisbane, Australia

Out Of The Unknown: Brisbane Bands 1976–1988
- Authors: Doug Hutson and Gavin Sawford
- Genre: Rock Music
- Publisher: Time Off
- Publication date: 1988
- Publication place: Australia
- Media type: Print (magazine)
- Pages: 47 pp

Out Of The Unknown: Brisbane Bands 1976–1988 is a comprehensive guide on Brisbane bands from 1976 to 1988, compiled by Doug Hutson and Gavin Sawford, and published by Time Off in 1988. The book features an A-Z band listing, discographies and interviews. The cover has a photo of The Go-Betweens with a surrounding artwork depicting musical instruments. Gavin Sawford was at one time the editor of Time Off.

== See also ==
- Time Off
- Popular entertainment in Brisbane
