= Big Day Out lineups by year =

Lineups of a music festival series

This is a listing of artists and bands who have performed at a Big Day Out music festival, listed by year. Big Day Out began in 1992 in Sydney and has expanded to include several Australian venues and Auckland, New Zealand. Each year, the line-up of artists changes, generally maintaining rock as the focus, but also featuring hip-hop, electronica and blues and roots artists. The line-ups have included Nirvana, Metallica, Pearl Jam, Foo Fighters, Chemical Brothers, Tool, Blink-182, Marilyn Manson, Muse, Hole, Nine Inch Nails and Red Hot Chili Peppers, while also promoting local Australian and New Zealand artists such as Spiderbait, Regurgitator, Powderfinger, Grinspoon, Silverchair and The Living End.

Contents: 1992 · 1993 · 1994 · 1995 · 1996 · 1997 · 1998 · 1999 · 2000 · 2001 · 2002 · 2003 · 2004 · 2005 · 2006 · 2007 · 2008 · 2009 · 2010 · 2011 · 2012 · 2013 · 2014
References · External links

== 1992 ==
Violent Femmes
Nirvana
Massappeal
Beasts of Bourbon
Celibate Rifles
Died Pretty
Ratcat
The Clouds
Yothu Yindi
Club Hoy
Cosmic Psychos
Falling Joys
Sound Unlimited Posse
Box the Jesuit
The Hellmenn
The Village Idiots
The Ruptured Spleans
You Am I
Smudge
The Meanies
The Welcome Mat^{[A]}
The Hard Ons with Henry Rollins
Scorched Earth Policy

Notes

- A The Welcome Mat were the first band to perform for the day, and thus became the first band to perform at any Big Day Out festival.

== 1993 ==
	Sydney	Melbourne	Adelaide	Perth
Iggy Pop	Yes	Yes	Yes	Yes
Sonic Youth	Yes	Yes	Yes	Yes
The Disposable Heroes of Hiphoprisy	Yes	Yes	Yes	Yes
Mudhoney	Yes	Yes	Yes	Yes
Carter the Unstoppable Sex Machine	Yes	Yes	Yes	Yes
Helmet	Yes	Yes	No	No
Beasts of Bourbon	Yes	Yes	Yes	Yes
Nick Cave and the Bad Seeds	Yes	Yes	Yes	Yes
Cosmic Psychos	Yes	Yes	Yes	Yes
The Meanies	Yes	Yes	Yes	Yes
The Clouds	Yes	Yes	Yes	Yes
The Hard Ons with Jerry A	Yes	Yes	Yes	Yes
You Am I	Yes	Yes	Yes	Yes
Not Drowning Waving	Yes	No	No	No
The Welcome Mat	Yes	No	No	No
Tumbleweed	Yes	No	No	No
Front End Loader	Yes	No	No	No
The Daisygrinders	Yes	No	No	No
The Atomics	No	No	Yes	No
TISM	No	Yes	No	No
Painters & Dockers	No	Yes	No	No
Exploding White Mice	No	No	Yes	No
Raisin Toast	No	No	Yes	No
Where's the Pope?	No	No	Yes	No
Mixed Relations	Yes	No	No	No
Swordfish	Yes	No	No	No
Armoured Angel	Yes	No	No	No
The Hummingbirds	Yes	No	No	No
Hoss	Yes	Yes	No	No
Headache	Yes	No	No	No
The Fauves	Yes	No	No	No
The Screaming Jets	Yes	No	No	No
Hellmenn	Yes	No	No	No
Def FX	Yes	No	No	No
Severed Heads	Yes	No	No	No
Itch-E and Scratch-E	Yes	No	No	No
Screamfeeder	Yes	No	No	No
The Lizard Train	No	No	Yes	No
Mantissa	No	Yes	No	No
The Chevelles	No	No	No	Yes
Batteries not included	No	No	Yes	No
V Spy V Spy	No	No	No	Yes
The Violets	No	No	Yes	No
Girl Monstar	No	Yes	No	No
DM3	No	No	No	Yes
Storytime	No	No	No	Yes
Babaganush	No	No	Yes	No
Neptune Lolly Shoppe	No	No	Yes	No
Undecided	No	No	Yes	No
Thrombus	No	No	No	Yes
Spiderbait	No	Yes	No	No
The Jaynes	No	No	Yes	No
Vivid	No	No	No	Yes
Underground Lovers	No	Yes	No	No
Soulscraper	No	Yes	No	No
Horsehead	No	Yes	No	No
Fireballs	No	Yes	No	No
Allegiance	No	No	No	Yes

Notes

- The above multi-city big stage artists confirmed by multiple sources such as the now defunct Big Day Out Website. Small stage bands confirmed in Howarth (2006).

== 1994 ==
	Sydney	Melbourne	Perth	Adelaide	Gold Coast	Auckland
Soundgarden	Yes	Yes	Yes	Yes	Yes	Yes
The Ramones	Yes	Yes	Yes	Yes	Yes	No
Björk	Yes	Yes	Yes	Yes	Yes	No
The Smashing Pumpkins	Yes	Yes	Yes	Yes	Yes	Yes
Mojo & the Black Cats Bone		Yes	Yes	Yes		No
Teenage Fanclub	Yes	Yes	Yes	Yes	Yes	No
The Breeders	Yes	Yes	Yes	Yes	Yes	Yes
Primus	Yes	Yes	No	No	No	No
Urge Overkill	Yes	Yes	No	No	No	Yes
The Cruel Sea	Yes	Yes	Yes	Yes	Yes	Yes
Tumbleweed	Yes	Yes	Yes	Yes	Yes	Yes
DJ Peewee Ferris	Yes	Yes	No	Yes	Yes	No
The Meanies	Yes	Yes	Yes	Yes	Yes	No
Def Fx	Yes	Yes	Yes	Yes	Yes	Yes
Straitjacket Fits	Yes	Yes	Yes	Yes	Yes	Yes
TISM	Yes	No	No	Yes	Yes	No
Screamfeeder	Yes	No	No	Yes	Yes	No
You Am I	No	No	No	No	Yes	Yes
The Hard Ons	No	No	No	No	Yes	Yes
Powderfinger	No	Yes	No	No	Yes	No
Dave Graney	Yes	Yes	No	No	No	No
Tiddas	Yes	Yes	Yes	Yes	Yes	No
Robert Forster	No	Yes	No	No	Yes	No
Severed Heads	Yes	Yes	Yes	Yes	Yes	No
DJ Sugar Ray	Yes	Yes	No	Yes	Yes	No
Itch-E and Scratch-E	Yes	Yes	No	Yes	Yes	No
The Celibate Rifles	Yes	Yes	Yes	No	No	No
The Mark Of Cain	Yes	No	No	Yes	No	No
Kiss My Poodle's Donkey	Yes	No	No	No	No	No
Boxcar	Yes	No	No	Yes	No	No
Southend	Yes	No	No	No	Yes	No
Sidewinder	Yes	No	No	No	No	No
No Comply	No	Yes	No	No	No	No
Vision Four 5	Yes	Yes	No	No	No	No
Loves Ugly Children	No	No	No	No	No	Yes
Clowns of Decadence	No	No	No	Yes	No	No
Capital F	No	No	No	Yes	No	No
The Miltons	No	No	No	Yes	No	No
Underground Lovers	Yes	No			No	No
Swoop	Yes	No			No	No
Crow	Yes	No			No	No
Trout Fishing in Quebec	Yes	No			No	No
Red Planet Rockets	Yes	No			No	No
Nitocris	Yes	No			No	No
Frenzal Rhomb	Yes	No			No	No
Nik Fish	Yes	No			No	No
Clan Analogue	Yes	No			No	No
Juice	Yes	No			No	No
Died Pretty	No	No			No	No
Hogfodder	No	No			No	No
Frente	No	Yes			No	No
Colourwheel	No	No	No	Yes	No	No
The Blackeyed Susans	No	No			No	No
Caligula	No	Yes	No	No	No	No
Verona	No	No			No	No
Autohaze	No	Yes			No	No
Exploding White Mice	No	No			No	No
Ammonia	No	No			No	No
The Fauves	No	Yes			No	No
Free Moving Curtis	No	No			No	No
Boom Babies	No	No			No	No
Bigger Than Jesus	No	Yes			No	No
Fireballs	No	No			No	No
Christopher Coe	No	Yes			No	No
Rosemary heads	No	No			No	No
Suiciety	No	Yes			No	No
These Immortal Souls	No	Yes	No	No	No	No
Groove Terminator	No	No			No	No
Seaweed Gorillas	No	Yes			No	No
Bliss	No	No			No	No
Bored	No	Yes			No	No
Robyn Habel	No	No			No	No
Ollie Olsen	No	Yes			No	No
The Lab	Yes	No			No	No
DJ Mark James	No	Yes			No	No
Snog	No	Yes			No	No
Front End Loader	Yes	No			No	No
Headless Chickens	No	No	No	No	No	Yes
3Ds	No	No	No	No	No	Yes
Head Like a Hole	No	No	No	No	No	Yes
Verlaines	No	No	No	No	No	Yes
The Bats	No	No	No	No	No	Yes
Emma Paki	No	No	No	No	No	Yes
Shihad	No	No	No	No	No	Yes
Element	No	No	No	No	No	Yes
MC O.J. & Rhythm Slave	No	No	No	No	No	Yes
Thorazine Shuffle	No	No	No	No	No	Yes
Able Tasmans	No	No	No	No	No	Yes
Snowman	No	No	No	No	No	Yes
Urban Disturbance	No	No	No	No	No	Yes
Pacifican Descendants	No	No	No	No	No	Yes
J.P.S.E.	No	No	No	No	No	Yes
Dam Native	No	No	No	No	No	Yes
David Kilgour	No	No	No	No	No	Yes
Dead Flowers	No	No	No	No	No	Yes
3 the Hard Way	No	No	No	No	No	Yes
Jan Hellriegel	No	No	No	No	No	Yes
King Loser	No	No	No	No	No	Yes
Tall Dwarfs	No	No	No	No	No	Yes
The Mutton Birds	No	No	No	No	No	Yes
Kid Eternity	No	No	No	No	No	Yes
Fur	No	No	No	No	Yes	No
Dream Poppys	No	No	No	No	Yes	No
Custard	No	No	No	No	Yes	No
DJ Angus	No	No	No	No	Yes	No
Budd	No	No	No	No	Yes	No
Pangaea	No	No	No	No	Yes	No
Dream Killers	No	No	No	No	Yes	No
Clouds	No	No	No	No	Yes	No

Notes

- 1994 Small stage bands above as listed in Howarth (2006)
- Auckland bands confirmed by advertisement posted to Kiwi Concert Date Archive 1994

== 1995 ==
	Sydney	Melbourne	Perth	Adelaide	Gold Coast	Auckland
Ministry	Yes	Yes	Yes	Yes	Yes	Yes
Primal Scream	Yes	Yes	Yes	Yes	Yes	Yes
Hole	Yes	Yes	No	No	No	Yes
The Cult	Yes	Yes	Yes	Yes	Yes	Yes
The Offspring	Yes	Yes	Yes	Yes	No	Yes
Screaming Trees	Yes	Yes	Yes	Yes	Yes	No
Luscious Jackson	Yes	Yes	Yes	Yes	Yes	Yes
Fun-Da-Mental	Yes	Yes	Yes	Yes	Yes	Yes
The Clouds	Yes	Yes	Yes	Yes	Yes	Yes
You Am I	Yes	Yes	Yes	Yes	Yes	Yes
Silverchair	Yes	Yes	Yes	Yes	Yes	Yes
Tumbleweed	Yes	No	No	No	Yes	No
Allegiance	Yes	Yes	Yes	Yes	Yes	Yes
Kim Salmon	Yes	Yes	Yes	Yes	Yes	No
Fireballs	Yes	Yes	Yes	Yes	Yes	No
The Mark Of Cain	Yes	Yes	Yes	Yes	Yes	No
The 3Ds	Yes	Yes	Yes	Yes	Yes	Yes
Fur	Yes	Yes	Yes	Yes	Yes	No
DJ Peewee Ferris	Yes	Yes	Yes	Yes	Yes	No
DJ Sugar Ray	Yes	Yes	Yes	Yes	Yes	No
Vision Four 5	Yes	Yes	Yes	Yes	Yes	No
Snog	Yes	Yes	Yes	Yes	Yes	No
Cosmic Psychos	No	Yes	No	Yes	Yes	No
Sisters Underground	Yes	Yes	Yes	Yes	Yes	Yes
OMC	Yes	Yes	Yes	Yes	Yes	Yes
Magic Dirt	Yes	Yes	No	No	Yes	No
FAT	No	No	No	No	Yes	No
Supergroove	Yes	Yes	No	No	No	Yes
Dave Graney	Yes	Yes	No	No	No	No
Spiderbait	Yes	Yes	No	No	No	No
Southend	Yes	No	No	Yes	Yes	No
Boxcar	Yes	No	No	Yes	Yes	No
Single Gun Theory	Yes	Yes	No	No	Yes	No
Severed Heads	Yes	No	No	No	No	Yes
Front End Loader	No	Yes	No	No	Yes	No
Mantissa	No	Yes	No	Yes	No	No
Powder Monkeys	No	Yes	No	No	No	No
Pumpkinhead	No	No	No	No	No	Yes
Loves Ugly Children	No	No	No	No	No	Yes
Headless Chickens	No	No	No	No	No	Yes
Underground Lovers	No	Yes		No	No	No
TISM	No	Yes		No	No	No
Moana and the Moahunters	No	No		No	No	Yes
Dimmer	No	No		No	No	Yes
Solid Gold Hell	No	No		No	No	Yes
Thorazine Shuffle	No	No		No	No	Yes
Urban Disturbance	No	No		No	No	Yes
DLT, OJ & Slave	No	No		No	No	Yes
Hallelujah Picassos	No	No		No	No	Yes
Upper Hutt Posse	No	No		No	No	Yes
Dam Native	No	No		No	No	Yes
Dead Flowers	No	No		No	No	Yes
Sticky Filth	No	No		No	No	Yes
The Clean	No	No		No	No	Yes
Tall Dwarfs	No	No		No	No	Yes
Tufnels	No	No		No	No	Yes
Fagan	No	No		No	No	
Semi Lemon Cola	No	No		No	No	Yes
Bilge Festival	No	No		No	No	Yes
Chug	No	No		No	No	Yes
David Kilgour	No	No		No	No	Yes
Foamy Ed	No	No		No	No	Yes
The best minds	No	No		No	No	
Balance	No	No		No	No	
Garageland	No	No		No	No	Yes
Jacinda	No	No		No	No	No
Tadpole	No	No		No	No	No
Love Custard Patrol	No	No		No	No	No
Chris Wilson	No	Yes		No	No	No
The Dirty Three	No	Yes		Yes	No	No
Bodyjar	No	Yes		No	No	No
Foil	No	Yes		No	No	No
D.I.G.	Yes	No		No	Yes	No
DJ Ransom	No	Yes		No	No	No
Future Sound of Melbourne	No	Yes	No	No	No	No
Voodoo Moon	No	Yes		No	No	No
DJ Andrew Till	No	Yes		No	No	No
Spiritualist	No	Yes		No	No	No
DJ Mark James	No	Yes		No	No	No
Warumpi Band	Yes	No		No	Yes	No
Pure	Yes	No		No	Yes	No
Deniz Tek	Yes	No		No	Yes	No
Custard	No	No		No	Yes	No
Indigo Husk	No	No		No	Yes	No
Melniks	No	No		No	Yes	No
Screamfeeder	No	No		No	Yes	No
Budd	No	No		No	Yes	No
Misery	No	No		No	Yes	No
Regurgitator	No	No		No	Yes	No
Bexta	No	No		No	Yes	No
Sexing the Cherry	No	No		No	Yes	No
DJ Ken Jenson	No	No		No	Yes	No
DJ Manuel Bundi	No	No		No	Yes	No
DJ Gracie	No	No		No	Yes	No
Trout Fishing in Quebec	No	No		Yes	No	No
BassX	No	No		No	Yes	No
Muff	No	No		No	No	No
The Egg	No	No		Yes	No	No
Numskulls	No	No		Yes	No	No
Mountain Hope	No	No		No	No	No
Liz Dealy band	No	No		Yes	No	No
Crush	No	No		Yes	No	No
Happy Patch	No	No		Yes	No	No
Goofy Footer	No	No		Yes	No	No
Icecream Hands	No	No		Yes	No	No
Miracle fish	No	No		Yes	No	No
DJ Angu$	No	No		Yes	No	No
Crisp	No	No		Yes	No	No
Wasted Youth	No	No		No	No	No
Lamia	No	No		No	No	No
Bucket	No	No		No	No	No
S.F.D	No	No		No	No	No
DJ Darren Brias	No	No		No	No	No
Kinetic Playground	No	No		Yes	No	No
Snout	No	Yes		No	No	No
The Reverend Horton Heat	No	No		No	No	Yes
Glide	Yes	No	No	No	No	No
The Verys	Yes	No	No	No	No	No
Drop City	Yes	No	No	No	No	No
Swirl	Yes	No	No	No	No	No
Downtime	Yes	No	No	No	No	No
Disneyfist	Yes	No	No	No	No	No
Baby Sugar Loud	Yes	No	No	No	No	No
Anti Anti	Yes	No	No	No	No	No
Scorched Earth	Yes	No	No	No	No	No
DJ Tod	Yes	No	No	No	No	No
Family	Yes	No	No	No	No	No
DJ Base Bitch	Yes	No	No	No	No	No
DJ Lesa	Yes	No	No	No	No	No
Size	Yes	No	No	No	No	No
Sub Bass Snarl	Yes	No	No	No	No	No
Krang	Yes	No	No	No	No	No
DJ MD	Yes	No	No	No	No	No
Nano Tech	Yes	No	No	No	No	No
DJ Gemma	Yes	No	No	No	No	No
Non Bosse Posse	Yes	No	No	No	No	No
DJ Rachel & Ace	Yes	No	No	No	No	No
Tel Harmonium	Yes	No	No	No	No	No
DJ Jad McAdam	Yes	No	No	No	No	No
DJ Phil Smart	Yes	No	No	No	No	No
DJ Robert Racic	Yes	No	No	No	No	No
Groove Terminator	No	No	No	Yes	No	No
Oasis	Cancelled	Cancelled	Cancelled	Cancelled	Cancelled	Cancelled

Notes

- A Oasis were originally named in the lineup, but cancelled after Liam Gallagher lost his voice.
- 1995 Small stage bands above as listed in Howarth (2006)

== 1996 ==
	Sydney	Melbourne	Perth	Adelaide	Gold Coast	Auckland
Porno for Pyros	Yes	Yes	Yes	Yes	Yes	Yes
Rage Against the Machine	Yes	Yes	Yes	Yes	Yes	Yes
Elastica	Yes	Yes	Yes	Yes	Yes	Yes
The Prodigy	Yes	Yes	Yes	Yes	Yes	Yes
The Jesus Lizard	Yes	Yes	Yes	Yes	Yes	Yes
Tricky	Yes	Yes	No	No	Yes	Yes
Billy Bragg	Yes	Yes	No	No	Yes	Yes
Reef	Yes	Yes	No	No	Yes	No
TISM	Yes	Yes	Yes	Yes	Yes	Yes
Nick Cave and the Bad Seeds	Yes	Yes	Yes	Yes	Yes	Yes
Tumbleweed	Yes	Yes	Yes	Yes	Yes	Yes
Regurgitator	Yes	Yes	Yes	Yes	Yes	Yes
Spiderbait	Yes	Yes	Yes	Yes	Yes	Yes
Radio Birdman	Yes	Yes	Yes	Yes	Yes	No
Shihad	Yes	Yes	Yes	Yes	No	Yes
Dirty Three	Yes	Yes	Yes	Yes	Yes	No
Sidewinder	Yes	Yes	Yes	Yes	Yes	No
Magic Dirt	Yes	Yes	Yes	Yes	Yes	No
Ammonia	Yes	Yes	Yes	Yes	Yes	No
Custard	Yes	Yes	Yes	No	Yes	No
Even	Yes	Yes	No	Yes	No	No
Powderfinger	Yes	Yes	No	No	Yes	No
Tweezer	Yes	No	No	No	No	No
DJ Sugar Ray	Yes	Yes	No	Yes	Yes	No
Single Gun Theory	Yes	Yes	Yes	Yes	Yes	No
Southend	Yes	No	No	No	Yes	No
Amunda	Yes	No	No	Yes	No	No
Continuum	Yes	Yes	No	No	No	No
FSOM	Yes	Yes	Yes	Yes	Yes	No
Groove Terminator	No	Yes	Yes	No	No	No
Manic Suede	No	Yes	No	No	No	No
eyespine	Yes	No	No	No	No	No
Pumpkinhead	No	No	No	No	No	Yes
Loves Ugly Children	No	No	No	No	No	Yes
Beaverloop	No	No	Yes	No	No	Yes
Blowhard	No	No	No	No	Yes	No
Pollyanna	Yes	Yes	No	Yes	Yes	No
SGT	No	Yes				
Bexta	No	No			Yes	
Jay Jay	No	No				
Eye TV	No	No				
Snout	No	Yes		Yes		
The Violets	No	No		Yes		
The Tear Jerks	No	No	Yes			
Pale	No	No			Yes	
Ed Kuepper	Yes	No				
Died Pretty	No	Yes				
Infectious Grooves	No	No	Yes			
Skunkhour	Yes	No				
Celibate Rifles	No	No				
Chopper Division	No	No				
Nunchukka Superfly	Yes	No				
Testeagles	No	No		Yes		
Infected	No	No	Yes			
Garageland	No	No				
iNsuRge	No	No			Yes	
Alchemist	Yes	No				
Wild Pumpkins at Midnight	No	Yes				
Hobsons Choice	No	No		Yes		
Dam Native	No	No				
Pangaea	No	No			Yes	
Big Heavy Stuff	Yes	No				
Kranktus	No	No		Yes		
Cinema Prague	No	No	Yes			
Dark Tower	No	No				
Midget	Yes	No				
Powder Monkeys	No	No				
Bearded Clams	No	No		Yes		
Flanders	No	No	Yes			
Elastica	No	No				
Chris Knox	No	No				
Turtlebox	No	No			Yes	
Spdfgh	Yes	No				
Nitocris	No	Yes				
Front End Loader	No	No		Yes		
Externals	No	No	Yes			
Future Stupid	No	No				
Bulldozer	No	No			Yes	
Sindog Jellyroll	Yes	No				
One Inch Punch	No	Yes				
The Superjesus	No	No		Yes		
D.M.3.	No	No	Yes			
Rancid	Yes	Yes	Yes	Yes		
Muckpole	No	No				
Pentheus	No	No			Yes	
The Hammonds	Yes	No				
Armoured Angel	No	Yes				
Challenger 7	No	No	Yes			
Head Like a Hole	No	No				
Gracie	No	No				
The Chills	No	No				
Reckoning	No	No		Yes		
Mutt	No	No	Yes			
Joint Forces	No	No				
Teremoan	No	No				
Ken Jensen	No	No				
Jad McAdam	Yes	No				
DJ Ransom	No	Yes				
Six Mile High	No	No	Yes			
Jungle Fungus	No	No				
Dirtbag	No	No	Yes			
Loaded Zilla	No	No		Yes		
DJ Phil Smart	Yes	No				
Dead Flowers	No	No				
Frankie D	No	Yes				
Sub Bass Snarl	Yes	No				
DJ Brendon	No	No				
Atmosfear	No	No	Yes			
Infusion	Yes	No				
Second Child	No	No				
Black Lung	No	Yes				
Angus	No	No				
Spank	No	No	Yes			
Nothing at all	No	No				
Mark James	No	Yes				
Darren Brias	No	No				
Applicators	No	No				
Digital Primate	No	Yes				
Bic Macs	No	No				
Greg Parker	No	No				
King Loser	No	No				
Superette	No	No				
Chug	No	No				
Bressa Creeting Cake	No	No				
HDU	No	No				
Jorden Reyne	No	No				
Short	No	No				
Cane Slide	No	No				
Bloom	No	No				
Figure 60	No	No				
Pet Rocks	No	No				
Inchworm	No	No				
Krushing Day	No	No				
Rail	No	Yes				
Earth Metal	Yes	No				
Marty B	Yes	No				
The 5000 Fingers of Dr T	Yes	No				
Lush Puppy	Yes	No				
Spore	Yes	No				
Om-E-Looper	Yes	No				
Alternahunk	Yes	No				
Bass Bitch	Yes	No				
Now Zero	Yes	No				
Michael MD	Yes	No				
Stoat	Yes	No				
Technomantra	No	Yes				
Bitscape	No	Yes				
Squidgy	No	Yes				
Rob Walmsley	No	Yes				
Lisa Greenaway	No	Yes				
Controlled Atmosphere	No	Yes				
Edwina, Preston & Ben	No	Yes				
DJ Sam	No	Yes				
Techton	No	Yes				
Amnesia	No	Yes				
Guyver III	No	Yes				
Solenoid	No	Yes				
Neil Boyack / Matt C	No	Yes				
DJ Messy	No	Yes				
Sam Sejavka	No	Yes				
Kieran Carroll	No	Yes				
Spartacus / Barroworn	No	Yes				
Moo	No	Yes				
Screamfeeder	No	No		Yes		

Notes

- 1996 Small stage bands above as listed in Howarth (2006)
- Kylie Minogue appeared on stage and performed with Nick Cave and the Bad Seed Wild ROSES

== 1997 ==
	Sydney	Melbourne	Perth	Adelaide	Gold Coast	Auckland
Soundgarden	Yes	Yes	Yes	Yes	Yes	Yes
The Offspring	Yes	Yes	Yes	Yes	Yes	Yes
The Prodigy	Yes	Yes	Yes	Yes	Yes	Yes
Fear Factory^{[A]}	Yes	Yes	Yes	Yes	Yes	Yes
Supergrass	Yes	Yes	Yes	Yes	Yes	Yes
Shonen Knife	Yes	Yes	Yes	Yes	Yes	Yes
Patti Smith	Yes	Yes	No	No	Yes	No
Jon Spencer Blues Explosion	Yes	Yes	No	No	No	No
Rocket From The Crypt	Yes	No	No	Yes	No	No
Aphex Twin	Yes	Yes	No	No	No	No
You Am I	Yes	Yes	Yes	Yes	Yes	Yes
Powderfinger	Yes	Yes	Yes	Yes	Yes	Yes
Tiddas	Yes	Yes	Yes	Yes	Yes	Yes
Beasts of Bourbon	Yes	Yes	Yes	Yes	Yes	Yes
Dave Graney and The Coral Snakes	Yes	Yes	Yes	Yes	Yes	Yes
Snout	Yes	Yes	Yes	Yes	Yes	No
Boo Boo Mace and Nutcase	Yes	Yes	Yes	Yes	Yes	Yes
Superjesus	Yes	Yes	Yes	Yes	Yes	No
The Clouds	Yes	No	Yes	No	Yes	No
iNsuRge	Yes	Yes	No	No	Yes	No
Screamfeeder	Yes	No	No	No	Yes	No
Even	No	Yes	No	Yes	Yes	No
Aquanaught	No	Yes	No	No	Yes	No
Drop City	Yes	No	No	Yes	Yes	No
Severed Heads	Yes	No	No	No	Yes	No
DLT, Che Fu & The Trueschool Crew	Yes	Yes	No	Yes	Yes	Yes
OMC	Yes	Yes	Yes	Yes	Yes	No
FSOM	Yes	Yes	No	No	Yes	No
Bexta	Yes	No	Yes	Yes	Yes	No
Pocket	No	No	Yes	Yes	Yes	No
The Fauves	Yes	Yes	No	No	No	No
Frenzal Rhomb	Yes	Yes	Yes	Yes	No	No
The Mavis's	No	Yes	No	Yes	No	No
Future Stupid	No	No	No	No	No	Yes
Headless Chickens	No	No	No	No	No	Yes
The Lemonheads	No	No	No	No	No	Yes
The Simpletons	No	No	No	No	Yes	No
The Porkers	Yes	No	No	No	No	No
Garageland	No					Yes
Bic Runga & Band	No					Yes
Thorazine Shuffle	No					Yes
Dead Flowers	No					Yes
Superette	No					Yes
Gluefest	No					Yes
Head Like a Hole	No					Yes
12 Tribes of Israel	No					Yes
Pash	No					Yes
Fontanelle	No					Yes
Solid Gold Hell	No					Yes
Ma-v-elle	No					Yes
Bailter Space	No					Yes
The 3Ds	No					Yes
Tall Dwarfs	No					Yes
Bressa Creeting Cake	No					Yes
Shihad	No					Yes
Blitz Babiez	No					Yes
Nothing At All!	No					Yes
Kitch	No					Yes
N Haines & M Bundy	No					Yes
DJ Stinky Jim	No					Yes
Lavalava	No					Yes
DJs Gideon & Chelsea	No					Yes
DJ 48 Sonic	No					Yes
In the Whare	No					Yes
Tim Teen & the Teen Tones	No					Yes
Stella	No					Yes
The Blackeyed Susans	No	Yes				No
HDU	No					Yes
The Feelers	No					Yes
Breathe	No					Yes
The Snitches	No					Yes
Cane Slide	No					Yes
Sugarbug	No					Yes
Mary Staples	No					Yes
Jordan Reyne	No					Yes
The Livids	No					Yes
Spiderbait	No	Yes				No
Paul Kelly	No	Yes				No
Magic Dirt	No	Yes				No
Bodyjar	No	Yes				No
Frente	No	Yes				No
DJ Ritchie Rich	No					No
DJ Mark James	No					No
DJ Phil K	No					No
DJ Ransom	No					No
Sonic Animation	No	Yes				No
DJ Matt Knipe	No					No
Voitek	No	Yes				No
DJ Simon Coyle	No					No
Shock Fungus	No					No
Toothfaeries	No					No
Paradise Motel	No					No
Pangaea	No					No
The Melniks	No					No
Emporium	No					No
Blister	No					No
Gaslight Radio	No					No
DJ Jen-E	No					No
DJ Gracie	No					No
DJ Kazu	No					No
Mother Hubbard	Yes					No
Celibate Rifles	Yes					No
The Cruel Sea	Yes					No
Smudge	Yes					No
Gerling	Yes					No
Harpoon	Yes					No
The John Reed Club	Yes					No
DJ Sugar Ray	Yes					No
DJ Grant	Yes					No
Cyclob	No					No
DJ Seymour & Gemma	Yes					No
Groove Terminator	Yes					No
DJ Young Jase	Yes					No
DJ Zietgeist	Yes					No
DJ Sally Sound	Yes					No
DJ Nervous	Yes					No
Synchro Mesh	Yes					No
DJs Sub Base Snarl	Yes					No
Atone	Yes					No
DJ Chin Bindi	Yes					No
Five Star Pizzeria	Yes					No
DJ Sista Bable Fish	Yes					No
Peeled Hearts Paste	Yes					No
DJ Dormitive Hypothesis	Yes					No
DJ Kazuminchi Grime	Yes					No
Eyespine	Yes					No
Superchute	Yes					No
Toy Death	Yes					No
Organism	Yes					No
W.U.A.U.L	Yes					No
DJ Heavy G	No					No
Duckpond	No					No
The Acid Babies	No					No
Larry Kronick Jnr	No					No
DJ Christo	No					No
The Longtall Dorks	No					No
The Mark of Cain	No					No
Honeyfix	No					No
Where's the Pope?	No					No
Buellah's Fix	No					No
Blood Sucking Freaks	No					No
Mr Fuzzy	No					No
Flat Stanley	No					No
Rash	No					No
The Iron Sheiks	No					No
Sindog Jellyroll	No					No
Onslaught	No					No
Helga	No					No
DJ Brendon	No					No
Aquilla	No					No
DJ Angus	No					No
DJ MPK	No					No
Allegiance	No					No
Ammonia	No					No
Lost	No					No
Tumbleweed	Yes					No
Elroy Flicker	No					No
Jack & the Beanstalk	No					No
Jebediah	No					No
Martian Radio	No					No
Atmosfear	No					No
Dumb Angels	No					No
Automatic	No					No
Hoii Palloii	No					No
Apartment 99	No					No
DJ John Ferris	Yes					No
DJ Pinto	No					No
Inertia	No					No
DJ Miggy	No					No
DJ Greg Packer	No					No
Deadstar	No	Yes				No
Cosmic Psychos	No	Yes				No
Our House	No	Yes				No
Dirty Three	No	Yes				No
Glide	Yes					No
Size	Yes					No
Vinyl	No	No	Yes	No	No	No
Jungle Massive Australia	Yes					
The Cleaner	Yes					
Rikochet	Yes					
Mach V	Yes					
Syndicate	Yes					
Psyche	Yes					
Q45	Yes					
David Gill	Yes					
Mc Kray	Yes					
Janie	Yes					
Sepultura^{[A]}	Cancelled	Cancelled	Cancelled	Cancelled	Cancelled	Cancelled

Notes

- A Sepultura were originally named in the lineup, but cancelled after Max Cavalera left the band in December 1996. Sepultura were replaced by Fear Factory.
- 1997 Small stage bands above as listed in Howarth (2006)

== 1998 ==
Big Day Out was not held in 1998.

== 1999 ==
	Sydney	Melbourne	Perth	Adelaide	Gold Coast	Auckland
Hole	Yes	Yes	Yes	Yes	Yes	Yes
Marilyn Manson	Yes	Yes	Yes	Yes	Yes	Yes
Korn	Yes	Yes	Yes	Yes	Yes	Yes
Fatboy Slim	Yes	Yes	Yes	Yes	Yes	Yes
Underworld	Yes	Yes	No	No	No	No
Ash	Yes	Yes	Yes	Yes	Yes	Yes
Deejay Punk-Roc	Yes	Yes	Yes	Yes	Yes	Yes
Fun Lovin' Criminals	Yes	Yes	Yes	Yes	Yes	Yes
Luke Slater Freek Funk	Yes	Yes	Yes	Yes	Yes	Yes
Manic Street Preachers	Yes	Yes	Yes	Yes	No	No
Roni Size	Yes	Yes	Yes	Yes	Yes	Yes
Sean Lennon	Yes	Yes	Yes	Yes	Yes	Yes
Soulfly	Yes	Yes	Yes	Yes	Yes	Yes
Sparklehorse	Yes	Yes	Yes	Yes	Yes	Yes
Warumpi Band	Yes	Yes	Yes	Yes	Yes	No
Regurgitator	Yes	Yes	Yes	Yes	Yes	Yes
Powderfinger	Yes	Yes	Yes	Yes	Yes	Yes
The Living End	Yes	Yes	Yes	Yes	Yes	Yes
Jebediah	Yes	Yes	Yes	Yes	Yes	Yes
Superjesus	Yes	Yes	Yes	Yes	Yes	Yes
Resin Dogs	Yes	No	No	No	Yes	No
Garageland	Yes	No	No	No	Yes	Yes
Fur	Yes	Yes	Yes	Yes	Yes	No
TISM	Yes	Yes	No	No	No	No
Sonic Animation	Yes	Yes	Yes	Yes	Yes	Yes
Even	Yes	Yes	Yes	Yes	Yes	No
Bexta	Yes	Yes	Yes	Yes	Yes	No
Ransom	Yes	Yes	Yes	Yes	Yes	No
The Mark of Cain	No	Yes	Yes	No	No	No
Antenna	Yes	Yes	No	No	Yes	No
Groove Terminator	Yes	Yes	No	No	Yes	Yes
Happyland	Yes	Yes	No	Yes	Yes	No
Bodyjar	Yes	Yes	Yes	Yes	No	No
Not From There	Yes	Yes	Yes	Yes	Yes	No
B(if)tek	Yes	Yes	No	No	No	No
Frontside	Yes	Yes	No	No	No	No
Coda	Yes	No	No	No	Yes	No
Soma Rasa	Yes	No	No	No	Yes	No
Headless Chickens	No	No	No	No	No	Yes
78 Saab	Yes	No	No	No	No	No
The Cruel Sea	Yes	Yes				
Hoolahan	Yes	No				
Tekkahadda		No				
DJ St Crustacean		No				
High Pass Filter		No				
Karma County	Yes	No				
DJ Sharif	Yes	No				
DJ Shrinker		No				
Shade		No				
Finiscad	Yes	No				
Matthew Thomas		No				
The Holy Mountain		No				
A.F.J Liberation Front		No				
George		No				
Pleasure Shoppe		No				
DJ Saroo		No				
Toothfairies		No				
Tulipan	Yes	No				
Like Mike		No				
Taxi		No				
Minit		No				
Screamfeeder		No				
Knievel	Yes	No				
Simon Coyle		No				
Boo Boo & Mace	Yes	No				
Stephen Allkins	Yes	No				
Meta base & Breath	Yes	No				
DJ Abel	Yes	No				
Frontside		No				
Wille Tell		Yes				
Friendly	Yes	No				
Bass Code AllStars	Yes	No				
Dave Edwards & MC Tiger Lulu	Yes	No				
Ali Omar		No				
Matt Vs Kayla & MC Zar	Yes	No				
Snog		Yes				
Brewster		Yes				
Ping		Yes				
Rekindle / Raised by Wolves	Yes	No				
Pappa Jase	Yes	No				
Dharma Bums	Yes	No				
Crucial D	Yes	No				
Cyrogenic	Yes	No				
Muzzy Pep	Yes	No				
Testeagles	Yes	No				
Atom 1		Yes				
Dogbouy		Yes				
Dexta	Yes	No				
Golden Rough	yes	No				
Mach1	Yes	No				
Flywheel	Yes	No				
C.L.M	Yes	No				
DJ Heavy G		Yes				
DJ Dandenong		Yes				
Chunky Move		Yes				
Dirty Three		Yes		Yes		
Snout		Yes				
Moler		Yes				
DJ Duckpond		Yes				
Cocktail Hour		No				
Matt Walker & Ashley Davis		Yes				
Spartacus Barraworn		Yes				
Sam G		Yes				
Sista B.B.		Yes				
Tetrphnm		Yes				
Testicle Candy		No				
Luxedo		Yes				
Gerling		Yes				
28 Days		Yes				
Mach Pelican		Yes				
Powder Monkeys		Yes				
Area 7		Yes				
Rocket Science		Yes				
Jayse Knipe		Yes				
Honeysmack		Yes				
Dee Dee		Yes				
Voiteck		Yes				
Fuge		No		Yes		
Wrench		No		Yes		
99 Reasons Why		No		Yes		
Fuglemen		No		Yes		
Brunatex		No		Yes		
DJ Royal		No		Yes		
Krystapinzch		No		Yes		
Antioiluvian		No				
Rocking Horse		No				
Toy Death		No				
Menstruation Sisters		No				
C.O.A.		No				
Alien Dave		No		Yes		
The Trims		No		Yes		
Blunderbuss		No				
Korvorkian		No				
DJ Larry Kronick		Yes				
Dave Last Orchestra		Yes				
Bad Boys Batucada		Yes				
Lucky Rich		Yes				
Pitch Black	No	No	No	No	No	Yes
Shihad	No	No	No	No	No	Yes
Bailter Space	No	No	No	No	No	Yes
Sina	No	No	No	No	No	Yes
Che Fu	No	No	No	No	No	Yes
Stellar	No	No	No	No	No	Yes
King Kapisi	No	No	No	No	No	Yes
Crackhead Experience	No	No	No	No	No	Yes
HDU	No	No	No	No	No	Yes
Head Like a Hole	No	No	No	No	No	Yes
The Feelers	No	No	No	No	No	Yes
Bic Runga	No	No	No	No	No	Yes
lo Fidelity Allstars	No	No	No	No	No	Yes

Notes

- 1999 Small stage bands above as listed in Howarth (2006)

== 2000 ==
	Sydney	Melbourne	Perth	Adelaide	Gold Coast	Auckland
Red Hot Chili Peppers	Yes	Yes	Yes	Yes	Yes	Yes
Nine Inch Nails	Yes	Yes	Yes	Yes	Yes	Yes
The Chemical Brothers	Yes	Yes	Yes	Yes	Yes	Yes
Foo Fighters	Yes	Yes	Yes	Yes	Yes	Yes
Blink-182	Yes	Yes	Yes	Yes	Yes	Yes
Joe Strummer & The Mescaleros	Yes	Yes	Yes	Yes	Yes	Yes
Basement Jaxx	Yes	Yes	Yes	Yes	Yes	Yes
Primal Scream	Yes	Yes	Yes	Yes	Yes	No
Atari Teenage Riot	Yes	Yes	Yes	Yes	Yes	Yes
Beth Orton	Yes	Yes	Yes	Yes	Yes	Yes
Goldie & MC Rage	Yes	Yes	Yes	Yes	Yes	Yes
Hardknox	Yes	Yes	No	No	Yes	Yes
The Hellacopters	Yes	Yes	Yes	Yes	Yes	Yes
Ozomatli	Yes	Yes	No	No	No	No
28 Days	Yes	Yes	No	No	Yes	No
Chunky Move	Yes	Yes	Yes	Yes	Yes	No
The Cruel Sea	Yes	Yes	Yes	Yes	Yes	No
Gerling	Yes	Yes	Yes	Yes	Yes	No
Grinspoon	Yes	Yes	Yes	Yes	Yes	Yes
Honeysmack	Yes	Yes	Yes	Yes	Yes	No
High Pass Filter	Yes	No	No	No	No	No
Icecream Hands	No	Yes	Yes	Yes	Yes	No
Jebediah	Yes	Yes	Yes	Yes	Yes	No
Josh Abrahams & Amiel Daemion	Yes	Yes	Yes	Yes	Yes	No
Killing Heidi	Yes	Yes	No	No	No	No
Love Camp 7	No	No	Yes	No	No	No
Magic Dirt	Yes	Yes	Yes	Yes	Yes	No
The Monarchs	Yes	No	No	No	Yes	No
Nokturnl	Yes	Yes	Yes	Yes	Yes	No
The Wolves	No	Yes	No	No	No	No
Peewee Ferris	Yes	Yes	Yes	Yes	Yes	Yes
Yothu Yindi	Yes	Yes	Yes	Yes	Yes	Yes
Pitch Black	Yes	Yes	No	No	Yes	Yes
Pound System	Yes	Yes	Yes	Yes	Yes	No
Resin Dogs	Yes	Yes	Yes	Yes	Yes	No
Salmonella Dub	Yes	Yes	No	No	Yes	Yes
Sample Gee	No	No	No	No	No	Yes
Sean Quinn	Yes	Yes	Yes	Yes	Yes	Yes
Shihad	Yes	Yes	Yes	Yes	Yes	Yes
Six Ft Hick	No	Yes	No	Yes	No	No
Savage Sun	No	No	No	No	No	Yes
Something for Kate	Yes	Yes	No	No	Yes	No
Spiderbait	Yes	Yes	Yes	Yes	Yes	Yes
Static'N'Lincoln	No	No	No	No	Yes	No
Testeagles	Yes	Yes	Yes	Yes	Yes	No
Turnstyle	No	No	Yes	No	No	No
Proton	No	No	Yes	No	No	No
Mr. Bungle^{[A]}	Cancelled	Cancelled	Cancelled	Cancelled	Cancelled	Cancelled

Notes

- A Mr. Bungle was originally going to appear, but was "kicked off" the festival via Anthony Kiedis' request after Mr. Bungle mocked Red Hot Chilli Peppers in a Halloween show.

== 2001 ==
	Sydney	Melbourne	Perth	Adelaide	Gold Coast	Auckland
Limp Bizkit^{[A]}	Yes	Cancelled	Cancelled	Cancelled	Yes	Yes
Rammstein	Yes	Yes	Yes	Yes	Yes	Yes
PJ Harvey	Yes	Yes	Yes	Yes	Yes	Yes
Placebo	Yes	Yes	Yes	Yes	Yes	Yes
Queens of the Stone Age	Yes	Yes	Yes	Yes	No	No
Coldplay	Yes	Yes	Yes	Yes	Yes	Yes
At the Drive-In	Yes	Yes	No	No	Yes	No
Carl Cox	Yes	Yes	Yes	Yes	Yes	Yes
The Black Eyed Peas	Yes	Yes	Yes	No	Yes	Yes
Darren Emerson	Yes	Yes	Yes	Yes	Yes	Yes
Happy Mondays	Yes	Yes	Yes	Yes	Yes	Yes
Mudvayne	Yes	Yes	Yes	Yes	Yes	Yes
Roni Size	Yes	Yes	Yes	Yes	Yes	Yes
Zoo Bombs	Yes	Yes	Yes	Yes	Yes	Yes
Adam Freeland	Yes	Yes	Yes	Yes	Yes	Yes
Sugardrive	Yes	No	Yes	Yes	No	No
28 Days	Yes	Yes	Yes	Yes	Yes	Yes
Alex Lloyd	Yes	Yes	Yes	Yes	Yes	No
The Avalanches	Yes	Yes	Yes	Yes	Yes	No
Bexta	Yes	Yes	Yes	Yes	Yes	Yes
Frenzal Rhomb	Yes	Yes	Yes	Yes	Yes	Yes
Friendly	Yes	Yes	Yes	Yes	Yes	Yes
John Butler Trio	Yes	Yes	No	No	Yes	No
Killing Heidi	Yes	Yes	Yes	Yes	Yes	Yes
Nitocris	Yes	Yes	Yes	Yes	Yes	No
Powderfinger	Yes	Yes	Yes	Yes	Yes	Yes
Pnau	Yes	Yes	Yes	Yes	Yes	Yes
Resin Dogs	Yes	Yes	Yes	Yes	Yes	Yes
Skulker	Yes	Yes	No	No	Yes	No
Sunk Loto	Yes	Yes	Yes	Yes	Yes	No
Sonic Animation	Yes	Yes	Yes	Yes	Yes	No
You Am I	Yes	Yes	Yes	Yes	Yes	No
King Kapisi	Yes	Yes	No	No	Yes	Yes
Greg Churchill	Yes	Yes	Yes	Yes	Yes	Yes
Declan	Yes	No	Yes	Yes	Yes	No
Coloured Stone	Yes	Yes	No	No	Yes	No
Augie March	No	Yes	No	Yes	Yes	No
The Go-Betweens	Yes	Yes	Yes	Yes	Yes	No
FIST	Yes	No	No	No	No	No
Digital Primate	Yes	Yes	No	No	Yes	No
Fur Patrol	No	No	No	No	No	Yes

Notes

- A Originally, Limp Bizkit was scheduled to headline the tour and appear at all locations, however after the death of a crowd member at the Sydney show, the group chose to withdraw from the remaining shows of the tour.

== 2002 ==
	Sydney	Melbourne	Perth	Adelaide	Gold Coast	Auckland
The Prodigy	Yes	Yes	Yes	Yes	Yes	Yes
New Order	Yes	Yes	Yes	Yes	Yes	Yes
Garbage	Yes	Yes	Yes	Yes	Yes	Yes
Basement Jaxx	Yes	Yes	Yes	Yes	Yes	Yes
The Crystal Method	Yes	Yes	Yes	Yes	Yes	Yes
NOFX	Yes	Yes	Yes	Yes	Yes	Yes
Jurassic 5	Yes	Yes	Yes	Yes	Yes	Yes
Dave Clarke	Yes	Yes	Yes	Yes	Yes	Yes
System of a Down	Yes	Yes	No	No	Yes	Yes
Alien Ant Farm	Yes	Yes	No	No	Yes	Yes
The White Stripes	Yes	Yes	Yes	Yes	Yes	Yes
Kosheen	Yes	Yes	Yes	Yes	Yes	Yes
Drowning Pool	Yes	Yes	Yes	Yes	Yes	Yes
Peaches	Yes	Yes	No	No	Yes	Yes
The Tea Party	No	No	Yes	Yes	No	No
Tomahawk	No	No	Yes	Yes	No	No
Audio Active	Yes	Yes	No	No	Yes	Yes
Amen	Yes	Yes	Yes	Yes	Yes	Yes
Silverchair	Yes	Yes	Yes	Yes	Yes	Yes
Regurgitator	Yes	Yes	Yes	Yes	Yes	Yes
Grinspoon	Yes	Yes	Yes	Yes	Yes	No
Stephen Allkins	Yes	Yes	Yes	Yes	Yes	No
Gerling	Yes	Yes	Yes	Yes	Yes	Yes
Something for Kate	Yes	Yes	Yes	Yes	Yes	No
Spiderbait	Yes	Yes	Yes	Yes	Yes	No
Magic Dirt	Yes	Yes	Yes	Yes	Yes	No
Superheist	Yes	Yes	Yes	Yes	Yes	No
Eskimo Joe	Yes	Yes	Yes	Yes	Yes	No
The Monarchs	Yes	Yes	Yes	Yes	Yes	No
Machine Gun Fellatio	Yes	Yes	Yes	Yes	Yes	Yes
GT	Yes	Yes	Yes	Yes	Yes	No
Sonic Animation	Yes	Yes	Yes	Yes	Yes	No
Betchadupa	Yes	Yes	No	No	Yes	Yes
Sean Quinn	Yes	Yes	Yes	Yes	Yes	No
FIST	Yes	No	No	No	No	No
Shutterspeed	Yes	No	No	No	Yes	No
Dern Rutlidge	Yes	Yes	No	No	No	No
Shihad	Yes	Yes	Yes	Yes	Yes	Yes
Primary	Yes	Yes	Yes	Yes	Yes	Yes
Hilt	No	No	No	No	No	Yes
Faithless^{[A]}	Cancelled	Cancelled	Cancelled	Cancelled	Cancelled	Cancelled

Notes

- A Faithless withdrew from the lineup after Maxi Jazz fractured his pelvis

== 2003 ==
	Sydney	Melbourne	Perth	Adelaide	Gold Coast	Auckland
Foo Fighters	Yes	Yes	Yes	Yes	Yes	Yes
Jane's Addiction	Yes	Yes	Yes	Yes	Yes	Yes
Underworld	Yes	Yes	No	No	Yes	Yes
PJ Harvey	Yes	Yes	Yes	Yes	Yes	Yes
Kraftwerk	Yes	Yes	Yes	Yes	Yes	Yes
Queens of the Stone Age	Yes	Yes	Yes	Yes	Yes	Yes
The Music	Yes	Yes	Yes	Yes	Yes	Yes
Luke Slater	Yes	Yes	Yes	Yes	Yes	Yes
Chicks on Speed	Yes	Yes	Yes	Yes	Yes	Yes
Wilco	Yes	Yes	Yes	Yes	Yes	Yes
Gonzales	Yes	Yes	Yes	Yes	Yes	Yes
Jebediah	Yes	Yes	Yes	Yes	Yes	Yes
Murderdolls	Yes	Yes	Yes	Yes	Yes	Yes
Sparta	Yes	Yes	Yes	Yes	Yes	Yes
Xzibit	Yes	Yes	No	No	Yes	Yes
COG	Yes	Yes	Yes	Yes	Yes	Yes
Jimmy Eat World	Yes	Yes	Yes	Yes	No	No
Machine Gun Fellatio	Yes	Yes	Yes	Yes	Yes	Yes
The Waifs	Yes	Yes	Yes	Yes	Yes	Yes
Kid Kenobi	Yes	Yes	Yes	Yes	Yes	Yes
Millencolin	Yes	Yes	Yes	Yes	Yes	Yes
Waikiki	Yes	Yes	Yes	Yes	Yes	Yes
You Am I	Yes	Yes	Yes	Yes	Yes	Yes
The Living End	Yes	Yes	Yes	Yes	Yes	Yes
Augie March	Yes	Yes	Yes	Yes	Yes	Yes
Deftones	Yes	Yes	Yes	Yes	Yes	Yes
Mark Dynamix	Yes	Yes	Yes	Yes	Yes	Yes
Resin Dogs	Yes	Yes	Yes	Yes	Yes	Yes
Darren Price	Yes	Yes	No	No	Yes	No
The Vines	Yes	Yes	Yes	Yes	Yes	No
Blindspott	No	No	No	No	No	Yes
Concord Dawn	No	No	No	No	No	Yes
Frenzal Rhomb	Yes	Yes	Yes	Yes	Yes	No
Pitch Black	No	No	No	No	No	Yes
The D4	No	No	No	No	No	Yes
The Hard Ons	Yes	Yes	Yes	Yes	Yes	No
Wash	No	No	No	No	No	Yes
DJ Sir Vere	No	No	No	No	No	Yes
Bexta	Yes	Yes	Yes	Yes	Yes	No
1200 Techniques	Yes	Yes	Yes	Yes	Yes	No
28 Days	Yes	Yes	Yes	Yes	Yes	Yes
8 Foot Sativa	No	No	No	No	No	Yes
Dry & Heavy	Yes	Yes	No	No	Yes	No
Eight	No	No	No	No	No	Yes
King Kapisi	No	No	No	No	No	Yes
Downsyde	No	Yes	Yes	No	Yes	No
Pacifier (Shihad)	Yes	Yes	Yes	Yes	Yes	Yes
Pan Am	No	No	No	No	No	Yes
Ritalin	No	No	No	No	No	Yes
Post-Life Disorder	No	No	No	No	Yes	No
Pre.Shrunk	Yes	Yes	No	No	Yes	No
Rocket Science	Yes	Yes	Yes	Yes	Yes	No
Tadpole	No	No	No	No	No	Yes
The Datsuns	No	No	No	No	No	Yes
The Sailors	No	Yes	No	No	No	No

== 2004 ==
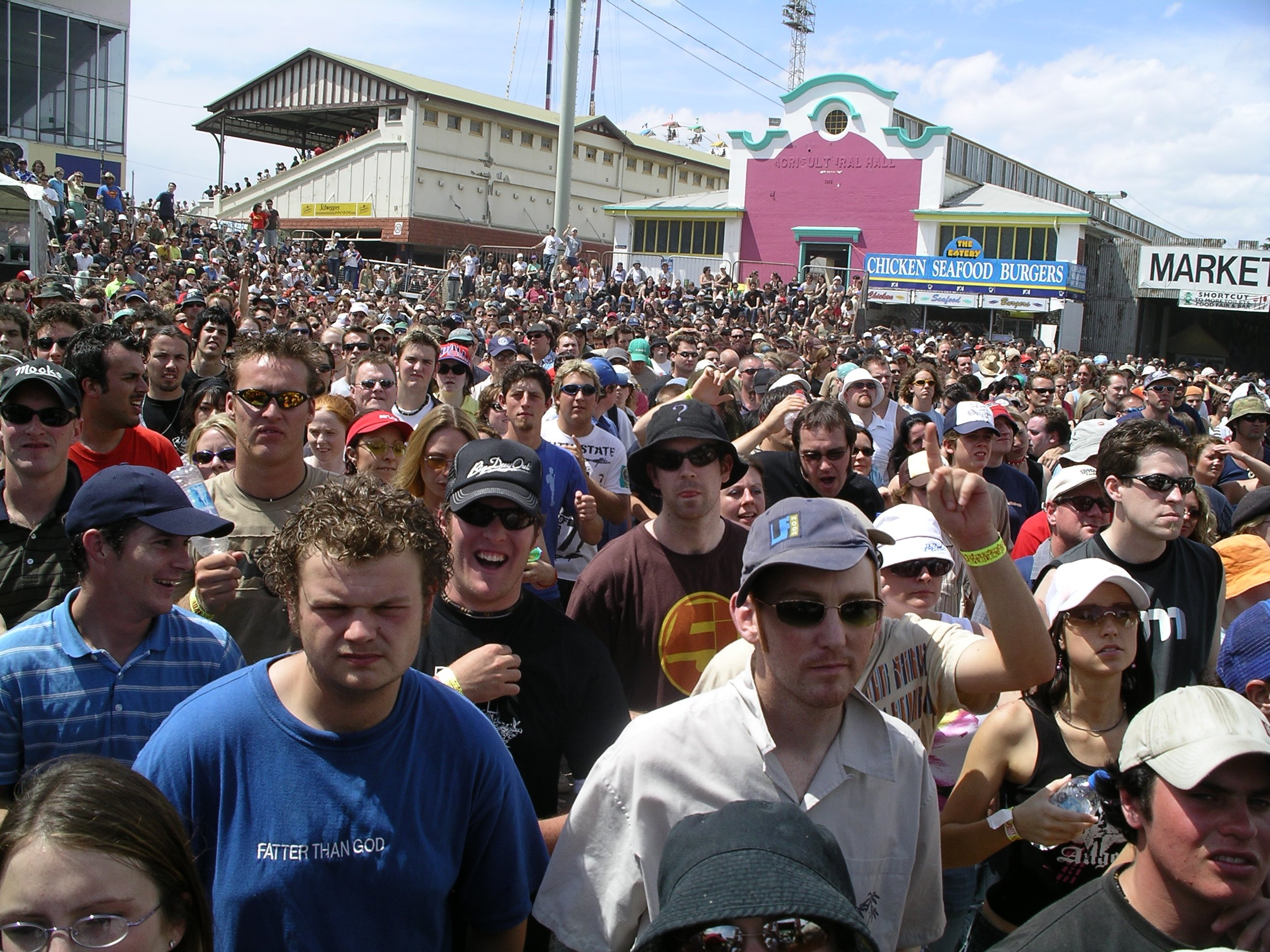
Crowd watching Gerling at the Melbourne BDO, 2004

	Sydney	Melbourne	Perth	Adelaide	Gold Coast	Auckland
Metallica	Yes	Yes	Yes	Yes	Yes	Yes
The Strokes	Yes	Yes	Yes	Yes	Yes	Yes
The Dandy Warhols	Yes	Yes	Yes	Yes	Yes	Yes
The Black Eyed Peas	Yes	Yes	Yes	Yes	Yes	Yes
The Darkness	Yes	Yes	Yes	Yes	Yes	Yes
Kings of Leon	Yes	Yes	Yes	Yes	Yes	Yes
Muse	Yes	Yes	Yes	Yes	Yes	Yes
Basement Jaxx	Yes	Yes	Yes	Yes	Yes	Yes
The Mars Volta	Yes	Yes	Yes	Yes	Yes	Yes
Poison the Well	Yes	Yes	Yes	Yes	Yes	Yes
The Flaming Lips	Yes	Yes	Yes	Yes	Yes	Yes
Aphex Twin	Yes	Yes	Yes	Yes	Yes	Yes
Luke Vibert	Yes	Yes	Yes	Yes	Yes	Yes
Afrika Bambaataa	Yes	Yes	Yes	Yes	Yes	Yes
Felix Da Housecat	Yes	Yes	Yes	Yes	Yes	Yes
Thursday	Yes	Yes	Yes	Yes	Yes	Yes
Peaches	Yes	Yes	Yes	Yes	Yes	Yes
Definitive Jux	Yes	Yes	Yes	Yes	Yes	Yes
Audio Bullys	Yes	Yes	Yes	Yes	Yes	Yes
David Holmes	Yes	Yes	Yes	Yes	Yes	Yes
Fear Factory^{[A]}	Yes	Yes	No	No	No	No
Lostprophets	Yes	Yes	No	Yes	Yes	Yes
Hoodoo Gurus	Yes	Yes	Yes	Yes	Yes	No
Skulker	Yes	Yes	Yes	Yes	Yes	No
The Sleepy Jackson	Yes	Yes	Yes	Yes	Yes	No
Magic Dirt	Yes	Yes	Yes	Yes	Yes	No
Jet	Yes	Yes	Yes	Yes	Yes	No
1200 Techniques	Yes	Yes	Yes	Yes	Yes	No
Open Thought	Yes	Yes	Yes	Yes	Yes	No
Fur Patrol	No	No	No	No	No	Yes
Gerling	Yes	Yes	Yes	Yes	Yes	Yes
The Butterfly Effect	Yes	Yes	Yes	Yes	Yes	No
Something for Kate	Yes	Yes	Yes	Yes	Yes	Yes
MC Trey	Yes	Yes	Yes	Yes	Yes	Yes
Pnau	Yes	Yes	Yes	Yes	Yes	Yes
Blood Duster	Yes	Yes	Yes	Yes	Yes	No
Sonic Animation	Yes	Yes	Yes	Yes	Yes	No
Pee Wee Ferris	Yes	Yes	Yes	Yes	Yes	No
Salmonella Dub	Yes	Yes	Yes	Yes	Yes	Yes
Friendly	Yes	Yes	Yes	Yes	Yes	No
Good Shirt	Yes	Yes	Yes	Yes	Yes	No
8 Foot Sativa	Yes	Yes	No	Yes	Yes	Yes
King Kapisi	Yes	Yes	Yes	Yes	Yes	Yes
Scribe and P-Money	Yes	Yes	Yes	Yes	Yes	Yes
Downsyde	Yes	Yes	Yes	Yes	Yes	No
Kamahl	Yes	Yes	Yes	Yes	Yes	Yes
Preshrunk	Yes	Yes	Yes	Yes	Yes	Yes
Rocket Science	Yes	Yes	Yes	Yes	Yes	Yes
Tadpole	Yes	Yes	Yes	Yes	Yes	Yes
The Datsuns	Yes	Yes	Yes	Yes	Yes	Yes
FURTHER	Yes	No	No	No	No	No
The Kt26ers	No	No	No	No	Yes	No
Karnivool	No	No	Yes	No	No	No
A Perfect Circle^{[A]}	Cancelled	Cancelled	Cancelled	Cancelled	Cancelled	No

Notes

- A American band A Perfect Circle withdrew from the lineup, while the group Fear Factory appeared as a mystery artist playing in place of all of A Perfect Circle's scheduled performances.

== 2005 ==
	Sydney	Melbourne	Perth	Adelaide	Gold Coast	Auckland
Beastie Boys	Yes	Yes	Yes	Yes	Yes	Yes
The Chemical Brothers	Yes	Yes	Yes	Yes	Yes	Yes
System of a Down	Yes	Yes	Yes	Yes	Yes	Yes
The Music	Yes	Yes	Yes	Yes	Yes	Yes
The Donnas	Yes	Yes	Yes	Yes	Yes	Yes
The Streets	Yes	Yes	Yes	Yes	Yes	Yes
Freestylers	Yes	Yes	Yes	Yes	Yes	Yes
Carl Cox	Yes	Yes	Yes	Yes	Yes	Yes
The Jon Spencer Blues Explosion	Yes	Yes	Yes	Yes	Yes	Yes
Slipknot	Yes	Yes	Yes	Yes	Yes	Yes
Happy Mondays	Yes	No	No	No	No	No
Hatebreed	Yes	Yes	Yes	Yes	Yes	Yes
Atmosphere	Yes	Yes	Yes	Yes	Yes	Yes
Le Tigre	Yes	Yes	Yes	Yes	Yes	Yes
Kid 606	Yes	Yes	Yes	Yes	Yes	Yes
The Polyphonic Spree	Yes	Yes	No	No	Yes	Yes
The Hives	Yes	Yes	No	No	Yes	Yes
Rise Against	Yes	Yes	Yes	Yes	Yes	Yes
Kid Koala	Yes	Yes	Yes	Yes	Yes	Yes
RJD2	Yes	Yes	Yes	Yes	Yes	Yes
Money Mark	Yes	Yes	Yes	Yes	Yes	Yes
Leeroy	Yes	Yes	Yes	Yes	Yes	Yes
Hilltop Hoods	Yes	Yes	Yes	Yes	Yes	No
Electrocute	Yes	Yes	Yes	Yes	Yes	No
Powderfinger	Yes	Yes	Yes	Yes	Yes	Yes
Grinspoon	Yes	Yes	Yes	Yes	Yes	Yes
John Butler Trio	Yes	Yes	Yes	Yes	Yes	Yes
Concord Dawn	Yes	Yes	Yes	Yes	Yes	Yes
8 Foot Sativa	Yes	Yes	No	Yes	Yes	Yes
The D4	Yes	Yes	Yes	Yes	Yes	Yes
Regurgitator	Yes	Yes	Yes	Yes	Yes	Yes
Scribe and P-Money	Yes	Yes	Yes	Yes	Yes	Yes
Deceptikonz	Yes	Yes	Yes	Yes	Yes	Yes
Evermore	Yes	Yes	Yes	Yes	Yes	Yes
Frenzal Rhomb	Yes	Yes	Yes	Yes	Yes	No
The Mess Hall	Yes	Yes	Yes	Yes	Yes	No
Jonathan Wall	Yes	Yes	Yes	Yes	Yes	No
Eskimo Joe	Yes	Yes	Yes	Yes	Yes	No
Infusion	Yes	Yes	Yes	Yes	Yes	No
Little Birdy	Yes	Yes	Yes	Yes	Yes	No
Dallas Crane	Yes	Yes	Yes	Yes	Yes	No
Butterfingers	Yes	Yes	Yes	Yes	Yes	No
Spiderbait	Yes	Yes	Yes	Yes	Yes	No
Decoder Ring	Yes	Yes	Yes	Yes	Yes	No
Bexta	Yes	Yes	Yes	Yes	Yes	No
Wolfmother	Yes	Yes	Yes	Yes	Yes	No
Digital Primate	Yes	Yes	Yes	Yes	Yes	No
Spazzys	Yes	Yes	Yes	Yes	Yes	No
Cut Copy	Yes	Yes	Yes	Yes	Yes	No
The Cops	Yes	Yes	Yes	Yes	Yes	No
The Nation Blue	No	Yes	No	No	No	No
Statler & Waldorf	No	No	No	No	Yes	No

== 2006 ==
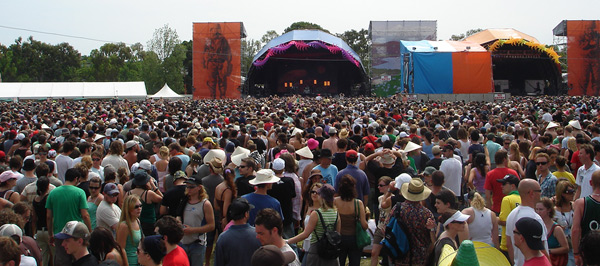
Crowd in front of the two main stages at the Big Day Out, Melbourne 2006.

	Sydney	Melbourne	Perth	Adelaide	Gold Coast	Auckland
The White Stripes	Yes	Yes	Yes	Yes	Yes	Yes
Iggy and the Stooges	Yes	Yes	Yes	Yes	Yes	Yes
Franz Ferdinand	Yes	Yes	Yes	Yes	Yes	Yes
Kings of Leon	Yes	Yes	Yes	Yes	Yes	Yes
The Mars Volta	Yes	Yes	Yes	Yes	Yes	Yes
Soulwax	Yes	Yes	Yes	Yes	Yes	Yes
2 Many DJs	Yes	Yes	Yes	Yes	Yes	Yes
Sleater-Kinney	Yes	Yes	Yes	Yes	Yes	Yes
The Magic Numbers	Yes	Yes	Yes	Yes	Yes	Yes
The Living End	Yes	Yes	Yes	Yes	Yes	Yes
Gerling	Yes	Yes	Yes	Yes	Yes	Yes
Dei Hamo	Yes	Yes	Yes	Yes	Yes	Yes
Shihad	Yes	Yes	Yes	Yes	Yes	Yes
Wolfmother	Yes	Yes	Yes	Yes	Yes	Yes
Mudvayne	Yes	Yes	Yes	Yes	Yes	Yes
The Go! Team	Yes	Yes	Yes	Yes	Yes	Yes
The Subways	Yes	Yes	Yes	Yes	Yes	Yes
The Union of Crazy Monkey People Outer Space	No	No	Yes	No	No	No
End of Fashion	Yes	Yes	Yes	Yes	Yes	Yes
James Murphy	Yes	Yes	Yes	Yes	Yes	Yes
The Greenhornes	Yes	Yes	Yes	Yes	Yes	Yes
Kid Kenobi + MC Sureshock	Yes	Yes	Yes	Yes	Yes	Yes
Henry Rollins	Yes	Yes	Yes	Yes	Yes	Yes
Silent Disco	Yes	Yes	Yes	Yes	Yes	Yes
Magic Dirt	Yes	Yes	Yes	Yes	Yes	No
Cut Copy	Yes	Yes	Yes	Yes	Yes	No
Hilltop Hoods	Yes	Yes	Yes	Yes	Yes	No
Cog	Yes	Yes	Yes	Yes	Yes	No
Beasts of Bourbon	Yes	Yes	Yes	Yes	Yes	No
Sonicanimation	Yes	Yes	Yes	Yes	Yes	No
Faker	Yes	Yes	Yes	Yes	Yes	No
The Grates	Yes	Yes	Yes	Yes	Yes	No
The Mess Hall	Yes	Yes	Yes	Yes	Yes	No
Youth Group	Yes	Yes	Yes	Yes	Yes	No
Wolf & Cub	Yes	Yes	Yes	Yes	Yes	No
Vitalic	Yes	Yes	Yes	Yes	Yes	No
Common	Yes	Yes	Yes	Yes	Yes	Yes
EDAN	Yes	Yes	Yes	Yes	Yes	No
Sarah Blasko	Yes	Yes	Yes	Yes	Yes	No
Airbourne	Yes	Yes	Yes	Yes	Yes	No
Red Riders	Yes	Yes	Yes	Yes	Yes	No
The Presets	Yes	Yes	Yes	Yes	Yes	No
DJ Ajax	Yes	Yes	Yes	Yes	Yes	No
DJ Bulge	Yes	Yes	Yes	Yes	Yes	No
DJ Jason Midro	Yes	Yes	Yes	Yes	Yes	No
MU	Yes	Yes	Yes	Yes	Yes	No
Caged Baby	Yes	Yes	Yes	Yes	Yes	No
Incredible Beatbox BandBit	Yes	Yes	Yes	Yes	Yes	No
M.I.A.	Yes	Yes	Yes	Yes	Yes	No
Foreshore	No	No	No	Yes	No	No
Mindfield	No	No	No	Yes	No	No
Monster Zoku Onsomb!	No	No	No	No	Yes	No
Asecretdeath	No	No	No	No	Yes	No
Parkway Drive	No	No	No	No	Yes	No
Fat Freddy's Drop	No	No	No	No	No	Yes
Elemeno P	No	No	No	No	No	Yes
The Bleeders	No	No	No	No	No	Yes
Che Fu and the Krates	No	No	No	No	No	Yes
Pluto	No	No	No	No	No	Yes
Frontline	No	No	No	No	No	Yes
The Brunettes	No	No	No	No	No	Yes
Fast Crew	No	No	No	No	No	Yes
Rhombus	No	No	No	No	No	Yes
Die!Die!Die!	No	No	No	No	No	Yes
The Sneaks	No	No	No	No	No	Yes
The Bats	No	No	No	No	No	Yes
Autozamm	No	No	No	No	No	Yes
Cobra Khan	No	No	No	No	No	Yes
Tyree & Juse	No	No	No	No	No	Yes
City Newton Bombers	No	No	No	No	No	Yes
Gestalt Switch	No	No	No	No	No	Yes
Raygunn	No	No	No	No	No	Yes
Anaham	No	No	No	No	No	Yes
The Electric Confectionaires	No	No	No	No	No	Yes
Gramsci	No	No	No	No	No	Yes
The Tutts	No	No	No	No	No	Yes
Jean Grae^{[A]}	Cancelled	Cancelled	Cancelled	Cancelled	Cancelled	No
AFI^{[A]}	Cancelled	Cancelled	Cancelled	Cancelled	Cancelled	Cancelled
Mylo^{[A]}	Cancelled	Cancelled	Cancelled	Cancelled	Cancelled	Cancelled

Notes

- A AFI, Mylo and Jean Grae withdrew from all scheduled performances in Big Day Out 2006.

== 2007 ==
	Sydney	Melbourne	Perth	Adelaide	Gold Coast	Auckland
Tool^{[A]}	Yes	Yes	Yes	Yes	Yes	Yes*
Muse	Yes	Yes	Yes	Yes	Yes	Yes
The Killers	Yes	Yes	Yes	Yes	Yes	Yes
Jet	Yes	Yes	Yes	Yes	Yes	Yes
Violent Femmes	Yes	Yes	Yes	Yes	Yes	Yes
Eskimo Joe	Yes	Yes	Yes	Yes	Yes	Yes
The Streets	Yes	Yes	Yes	Yes	Yes	Yes
The Vines	Yes	Yes	Yes	Yes	Yes	Yes
John Butler Trio	Yes	Yes	Yes	Yes	Yes	Yes
Kasabian	Yes	Yes	Yes	Yes	Yes	Yes
The Crystal Method DJs	Yes	Yes	Yes	Yes	Yes	Yes
Scribe	Yes	Yes	Yes	Yes	Yes	Yes
My Chemical Romance	Yes	Yes	Yes	Yes	Yes	Yes
Evermore	Yes	Yes	Yes	Yes	Yes	Yes
Justice	Yes	Yes	Yes	Yes	Yes	Yes
Peaches & Herms	Yes	Yes	Yes	Yes	Yes	Yes
Trivium	Yes	Yes	Yes	Yes	Yes	Yes
John Cooper Clarke	Yes	Yes	Yes	Yes	Yes	Yes
Incredible Beatbox Band	Yes	Yes	Yes	Yes	Yes	Yes
Little Birdy	Yes	Yes	Yes	Yes	Yes	Yes
The Presets	Yes	Yes	Yes	Yes	Yes	Yes
Spank Rock	Yes	Yes	Yes	Yes	Yes	Yes
Luciano	Yes	Yes	Yes	Yes	Yes	Yes
Lily Allen	Yes	Yes	No	No	Yes	Yes
Lupe Fiasco	Yes	Yes	No	No	Yes	Yes
Diplo	Yes	Yes	No	No	Yes	Yes
Shapeshifter	Yes	Yes	No	No	Yes	Yes
Hot Chip	Yes	Yes	No	No	Yes	Yes
That 1 Guy	Yes	Yes	No	No	Yes	Yes
DJ Sir-Vere	Yes	Yes	No	No	Yes	Yes
Misha Wakerman	Yes	Yes	No	No	Yes	Yes
Something for Kate	Yes	Yes	Yes	Yes	Yes	No
You Am I	Yes	Yes	Yes	Yes	Yes	No
Bob Evans	Yes	Yes	Yes	Yes	Yes	No
The Butterfly Effect	Yes	Yes	Yes	Yes	Yes	No
The Sleepy Jackson	Yes	Yes	Yes	Yes	Yes	No
The Herd	Yes	Yes	Yes	Yes	Yes	No
Spazzys	Yes	Yes	Yes	Yes	Yes	No
The Drones	Yes	Yes	Yes	Yes	Yes	No
Love Tattoo	Yes	Yes	Yes	Yes	Yes	No
Mark Murphy	Yes	Yes	Yes	Yes	Yes	No
Snowman	Yes	Yes	Yes	Yes	Yes	No
Sick Puppies	Yes	Yes	Yes	Yes	Yes	No
Digital Primate	Yes	Yes	Yes	Yes	Yes	No
Macromantics	Yes	Yes	No	No	Yes	No
TZU	Yes	Yes	No	No	Yes	No
Foreign Heights	Yes	Yes	No	No	Yes	No
P Money	Yes	Yes	No	No	Yes	No
Heavy Flint Show	Yes	Yes	No	No	Yes	No
Aching2Be	Yes	Yes	No	No	Yes	No
Dan Kelly & The Alpha Males	Yes	Yes	No	No	No	No
Ground Components	Yes	Yes	No	No	No	No
Gersey	Yes	Yes	No	No	No	No
Angus and Julia Stone	Yes	Yes	No	No	No	No
Something With Numbers	Yes	No	No	No	No	No
Calerway	No	No	Yes	No	No	No
Birds of Tokyo	No	No	Yes	No	No	No
Double Dragon	No	No	No	Yes	No	No
Tony Font Show	No	No	No	Yes	No	No
Monster Zoku Onsomb!	No	No	No	No	Yes	No
Lump	No	No	No	No	Yes	No
Blindspott	No	No	No	No	No	Yes
David Kilgour	No	No	No	No	No	Yes
Deceptikonz	No	No	No	No	No	Yes
The Rabble	No	No	No	No	No	Yes
PNC	No	No	No	No	No	Yes
Dimmer	No	No	No	No	No	Yes
Sinate	No	No	No	No	No	Yes
Goodnight Nurse	No	No	No	No	No	Yes
The Shaky Hands	No	No	No	No	No	Yes
The Veils	No	No	No	No	No	Yes
The Mint Chicks	No	No	No	No	No	Yes
The Tutts	No	No	No	No	No	Yes
Minuit	No	No	No	No	No	Yes
Opensouls	No	No	No	No	No	Yes
Jakob	No	No	No	No	No	Yes
Die! Die! Die!	No	No	No	No	No	Yes
North Shore Pony Club	No	No	No	No	No	Yes
The Tuesdays	No	No	No	No	No	Yes
Blueprint	No	Yes	No	No	No	No

Notes

- A Tool's performance in Auckland featured Serj Tankian of System of a Down for the song "Sober"

== 2008 ==
	Sydney	Melbourne	Perth	Adelaide	Gold Coast	Auckland
Rage Against the Machine	Yes	Yes	Yes	Yes	Yes	Yes
Björk^{[A]}	Cancelled	Yes	Yes	Yes	Yes	Yes
Arcade Fire	Yes	Yes	Yes	Yes	Yes	Yes
Grinspoon	Yes	Yes	Yes	Yes	Yes	Yes
Hilltop Hoods	Yes	Yes	Yes	Yes	Yes	Yes
Billy Bragg	Yes	Yes	Yes	Yes	Yes	Yes
Paul Kelly	Yes	Yes	Yes	Yes	Yes	Yes
LCD Soundsystem	Yes	Yes	Yes	Yes	Yes	Yes
Sarah Blasko	Yes	Yes	Yes	Yes	Yes	No
Faker	Yes	Yes	Yes	Yes	Yes	No
Midnight Juggernauts	Yes	Yes	Yes	Yes	Yes	No
Dizzee Rascal	Yes	Yes	Yes	Yes	Yes	Yes
Something With Numbers	Yes	Yes	Yes	Yes	Yes	No
Battles	Yes	Yes	Yes	Yes	Yes	Yes
Cut Off Your Hands	Yes	Yes	Yes	Yes	Yes	Yes
Silverchair	Yes	Yes	Yes	Yes	Yes	No
Spoon	Yes	Yes	Yes	Yes	Yes	Yes
Unkle	Yes	Yes	Yes	Yes	Yes	Yes
Augie March	Yes	Yes	Yes	Yes	Yes	No
Brand New	Yes	Yes	Yes	Yes	Yes	Yes
Regurgitator	Yes	Yes	Yes	Yes	Yes	No
Anti-Flag	Yes	Yes	Yes	Yes	Yes	Yes
Karnivool	Yes	Yes	Yes	Yes	Yes	No
Carl Cox	Yes	Yes	Yes	Yes	Yes	Yes
Pnau	Yes	Yes	Yes	Yes	Yes	No
Kate Nash	Yes	Yes	Yes	Yes	Yes	Yes
Josh Pyke	Yes	Yes	Yes	Yes	Yes	No
beXta	Yes	Yes	Yes	Yes	Yes	No
Shy Child	Yes	Yes	Yes	Yes	Yes	Yes
Eddy Current Suppression Ring	Yes	Yes	Yes	No	Yes	No
Gyroscope	Yes	Yes	Yes	Yes	Yes	No
Shihad	No	No	No	No	No	Yes
Enter Shikari	Yes	Yes	Yes	Yes	Yes	Yes
Operator Please	Yes	Yes	Yes	Yes	Yes	Yes
Alex Bennet	Yes	Yes	Yes	Yes	Yes	No
Krafty Kutz and MC Dynamite	Yes	Yes	Yes	Yes	Yes	Yes
Die! Die! Die!	Yes	Yes	No	No	Yes	Yes
The Nightwatchman	Yes	Yes	Yes	Yes	Yes	Yes
Blue King Brown	Yes	Yes	No	No	Yes	No
Dr Octagon with Kutmasta Kurt	Yes	Yes	No	No	Yes	Yes
British India	Yes	Yes	Yes	Yes	Yes	No
Aceyalone	Yes	Yes	No	No	Yes	Yes
KRILL (band)	Yes	Yes	Yes	Yes	Yes	No
The Pryor Theory	No	Yes	No	No	No	No
The Clean	No	No	No	No	No	Yes
Behind Crimson Eyes	No	Yes	No	No	No	No
Former Child Stars	No	No	No	Yes	No	No
Katchafire	No	No	No	No	No	Yes
The Phoenix Foundation	No	No	No	No	No	Yes
SJD	No	No	No	No	No	Yes
Young Sid	No	No	No	No	No	Yes
Antagonist	No	No	No	No	No	Yes
Motocade	No	No	No	No	No	Yes
White Birds and Lemons	No	No	No	No	No	Yes
Opshop	No	No	No	No	No	Yes
Pluto	No	No	No	No	No	Yes
Scribe	No	No	No	No	No	Yes
Liam Finn	No	No	No	No	No	Yes
Tiki Taane	No	No	No	No	No	Yes
Mikey Havoc	No	No	No	No	No	Yes
The Exiles	No	No	No	No	No	Yes
Collapsing Cities	No	No	No	No	No	Yes
Bleeders	No	No	No	No	No	Yes
Supergroove	No	No	No	No	No	Yes
Battle Circus	No	No	No	No	No	Yes
The Checks	No	No	No	No	No	Yes
The Lookie Loos	No	No	No	No	No	Yes
Dam Native	No	No	No	No	No	Yes
The Black Market Rhythm Co.	No	No	No	No	Yes	No
Rogerthat	No	No	No	No	Yes	No
Grassroots Street Orchestra	No	No	No	No	Yes	No
False Start	No	No	No	No	No	Yes
Miso	No	Yes	No	No	No	No

Notes

- A Björk was forced to pull out her performance at the Sydney Big Day Out under doctor's orders following swelling on her vocal cords.

== 2009 ==
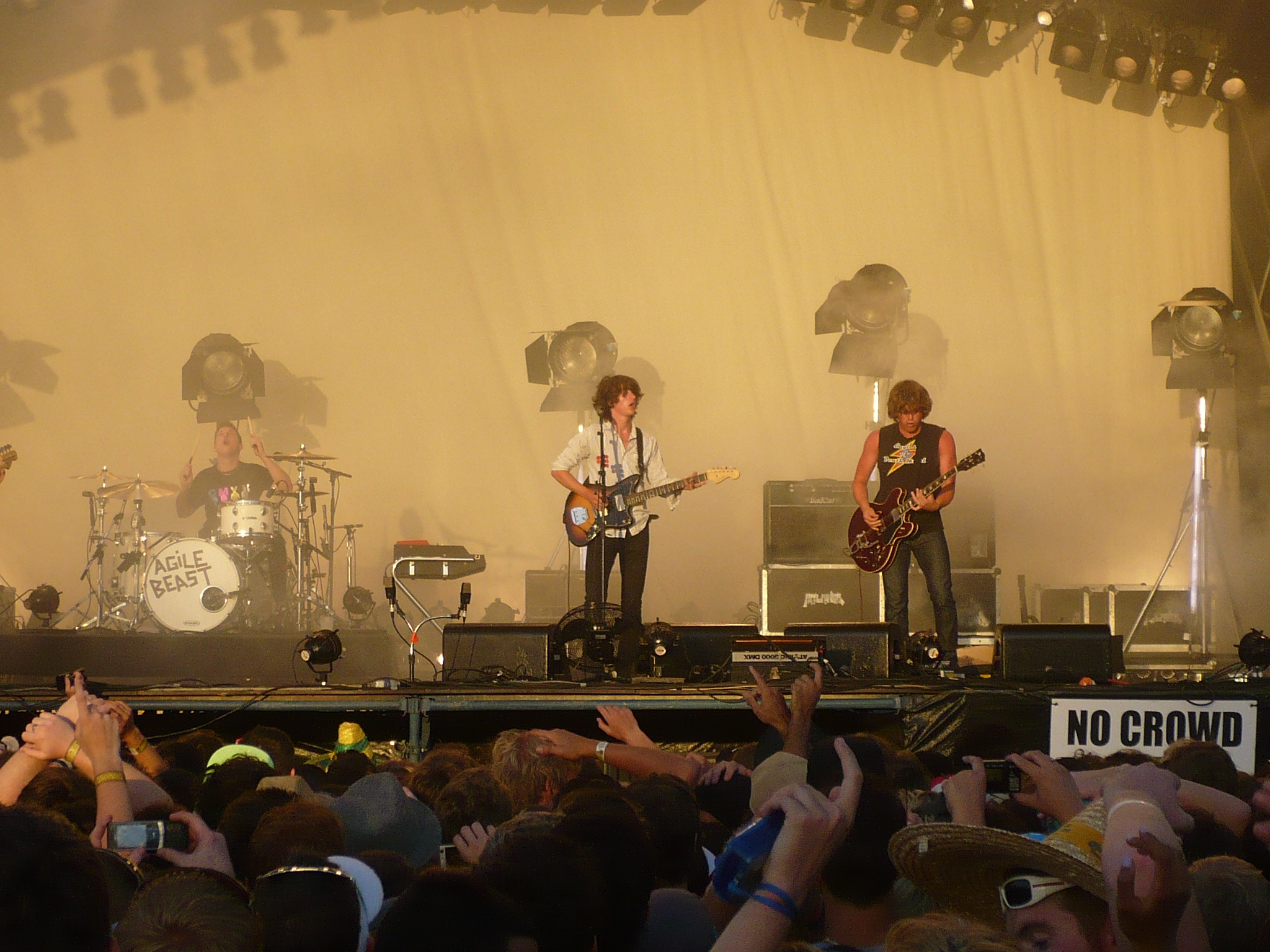
Arctic Monkeys, Big Day Out 2009

	Sydney	Melbourne	Perth	Adelaide	Gold Coast	Auckland
Neil Young	Yes	Yes	Yes	Yes	Yes	Yes
The Prodigy	Yes	Yes	Yes	Yes	Yes	Yes
Arctic Monkeys	Yes	Yes	Yes	Yes	Yes	Yes
Cut Copy	Yes	Yes	Yes	Yes	Yes	Yes
The Living End	Yes	Yes	Yes	Yes	Yes	Yes
Sneaky Sound System	Yes	Yes	Yes	Yes	Yes	Yes
My Morning Jacket	Yes	Yes	Yes	Yes	Yes	Yes
Pendulum	Yes	Yes	Yes	Yes	Yes	Yes
Bullet for My Valentine	Yes	Yes	Yes	Yes	Yes	Yes
TV on the Radio	Yes	Yes	Yes	Yes	Yes	Yes
The Butterfly Effect	Yes	Yes	Yes	Yes	Yes	Yes
Cog	Yes	Yes	Yes	Yes	Yes	Yes
Youth Group	Yes	Yes	Yes	Yes	Yes	No
The Grates	Yes	Yes	Yes	Yes	Yes	No
Birds of Tokyo	Yes	Yes	Yes	Yes	Yes	Yes
TZU	Yes	Yes	Yes	Yes	Yes	Yes
Eddy Current Suppression Ring	Yes	Yes	Yes	Yes	Yes	Yes
Simian Mobile Disco	Yes	Yes	Yes	Yes	Yes	Yes
The Ting Tings	Yes	Yes	Yes	Yes	Yes	Yes
Serj Tankian	Yes	Yes	Yes	Yes	Yes	Yes
Dropkick Murphys	Yes	Yes	Yes	Yes	Yes	Yes
Black Kids	Yes	Yes	Yes	Yes	Yes	Yes
Hot Chip	Yes	Yes	Yes	Yes	Yes	Yes
Lupe Fiasco	Yes	Yes	Yes	Yes	Yes	Yes
Holy Ghost	Yes	Yes	Yes	Yes	Yes	Yes
Z*Trip	Yes	Yes	No	No	Yes	Yes
Infusion	Yes	Yes	Yes	Yes	Yes	Yes
Children Collide	Yes	Yes	Yes	Yes	Yes	Yes
Chaos Divine	No	No	Yes	No	No	No
Pee Wee Ferris	Yes	Yes	Yes	Yes	Yes	Yes
Sparkadia	Yes	Yes	Yes	Yes	Yes	Yes
The Getaway Plan	Yes	Yes	Yes	Yes	Yes	Yes
Little Red	Yes	Yes	Yes	Yes	Yes	Yes
Mammal	Yes	Yes	Yes	Yes	Yes	Yes
Mercy Arms	Yes	Yes	Yes	Yes	Yes	Yes
Xenos	Yes	Yes	Yes	Yes	Yes	Yes
Andee Frost	Yes	Yes	Yes	Yes	Yes	Yes
The Drones	Yes	Yes	Yes	Yes	Yes	Yes
Died Pretty	Yes	Yes	Yes	Yes	Yes	Yes
Fantômas^{[A]}	Yes	Yes	Yes	Yes	Yes	Yes
Son of Dave	Yes	Yes	Yes	Yes	Yes	Yes
T-Rek	Yes	Yes	Yes	Yes	Yes	Yes
Quan	Yes	Yes	Yes	Yes	Yes	Yes
Barrance Whitfield & Rockwiz Orkestra	Yes	Yes	Yes	Yes	Yes	Yes
I Heart Hiroshima	Yes	No	No	No	Yes	No
The Reels	Yes	Yes	No	No	No	No
Headless Chickens	No	No	No	No	No	Yes
Elemeno P	No	No	No	No	No	Yes
Luger Boa	No	No	No	No	No	Yes
The Black Seeds	No	No	No	No	No	Yes
Cobra Khan	No	No	No	No	No	Yes
Nesian Mystik	No	No	No	No	No	Yes
The Datsuns	No	No	No	No	No	Yes
Ladi 6	No	No	No	No	No	Yes
The Naked and Famous	No	No	No	No	No	Yes
Zane Lowe	No	No	No	No	No	Yes
The Mint Chicks	No	No	No	No	No	Yes
P-Money	No	No	No	No	No	Yes
Brand New Math	No	No	No	No	No	Yes
Tiki Taane	No	No	No	No	No	Yes
Cornerstone Roots	No	No	No	No	No	Yes
The DHDFD's	No	No	No	No	No	Yes
Ethical	No	No	No	No	No	Yes
George & Queen	No	No	No	No	No	Yes
Horsemen Family	No	No	No	No	No	Yes
Sidekicknick	No	No	No	No	No	Yes
Subtract	No	No	No	No	No	Yes
An Emerald City	No	No	No	No	No	Yes
Antiform	No	No	No	No	No	Yes
Autozamm	No	No	No	No	No	Yes
Bang! Bang! Eche!	No	No	No	No	No	Yes
Bionic Pixie	No	No	No	No	No	Yes
Clap Clap Riot	No	No	No	No	No	Yes
Honey Claws	No	No	No	No	No	Yes
Just One Fix	No	No	No	No	No	Yes
Kolab	No	No	No	No	No	Yes
Quay Street Social Club DJ's	No	No	No	No	No	Yes
State of Mind	No	No	No	No	No	Yes
The Mots	No	No	No	No	No	Yes
The Tutts	No	No	No	No	No	Yes
Weta	No	No	No	No	No	Yes
World War Four	No	No	No	No	No	Yes
Sasha Vatoff	Yes	No	No	No	No	No
The Shiny Brights	No	No	No	Yes	No	No
The Vines^{[B]}	Cancelled	Cancelled	Cancelled	Cancelled	Cancelled	No

Notes

- A Fantômas appeared at all shows performing their album The Director's Cut in its entirety.
- B The Vines were forced to cancel all shows due to singer Craig Nicholls state of mental health.^{[B]}

== 2010 ==
The first official line-up for the 2010 installment was posted on the Big Day Out website just before midnight 28 September 2009. The second official line-up for the 2010 installment was posted on the Big Day Out website just before midnight 11 November 2009. The full line-up was as follows

	Sydney	Melbourne	Perth	Adelaide	Gold Coast	Auckland
Muse	Yes	Yes	Yes	Yes	Yes	Yes
Powderfinger	Yes	Yes	Yes	Yes	Yes	Yes
The Mars Volta	Yes	Yes	Yes	Yes	Yes	Yes
Lily Allen	Yes	Yes	Yes	Yes	Yes	Yes
Groove Armada	Yes	Yes	Yes	Yes	Yes	Yes
Kasabian	Yes	Yes	Yes	Yes	Yes	Yes
Dizzee Rascal	Yes	Yes	Yes	Yes	Yes	Yes
Peaches	Yes	Yes	Yes	Yes	Yes	Yes
Girl Talk	Yes	Yes	Yes	Yes	Yes	Yes
Rise Against	Yes	Yes	Yes	Yes	Yes	Yes
Mastodon	Yes	Yes	Yes	Yes	Yes	Yes
The Horrors	Yes	Yes	Yes	Yes	Yes	Yes
Calvin Harris	Yes	Yes	Yes	Yes	Yes	Yes
The Decemberists	Yes	Yes	Yes	Yes	Yes	Yes
Passion Pit	Yes	Yes	Yes	Yes	Yes	Yes
Devendra Banhart	Yes	Yes	Yes	Yes	Yes	Yes
Sasha	Yes	Yes	Yes	Yes	Yes	Yes
Simian Mobile Disco	Yes	Yes	Yes	Yes	Yes	Yes
Fear Factory	Yes	Yes	Yes	Yes	Yes	Yes
Dead Prez	Yes	Yes	No	No	Yes	Yes
Eskimo Joe	Yes	Yes	Yes	Yes	Yes	Yes
Karnivool	Yes	Yes	Yes	Yes	Yes	Yes
MikiMASH	Yes	Yes	Yes	Yes	Yes	Yes
Ladyhawke	Yes	Yes	Yes	Yes	Yes	Yes
The Temper Trap	Yes	Yes	Yes	Yes	Yes	Yes
Jet	Yes	Yes	Yes	Yes	Yes	Yes
Silent Disco	Yes	Yes	Yes	Yes	Yes	Yes
Grinspoon	Yes	Yes	Yes	Yes	Yes	Yes
Midnight Juggernauts	Yes	Yes	Yes	Yes	Yes	Yes
Tame Impala	Yes	Yes	Yes	Yes	Yes	Yes
Kisschasy	Yes	Yes	Yes	Yes	Yes	Yes
Magic Dirt	No	Yes	Yes	Yes	Yes	Yes
Lisa Mitchell	Yes	Yes	Yes	Yes	Yes	No
Bluejuice	Yes	Yes	Yes	Yes	Yes	Yes
Hilltop Hoods	Yes	Yes	Yes	Yes	Yes	Yes
Miami Horror	Yes	Yes	Yes	Yes	Yes	Yes
Maya Jupiter	Yes	Yes	Yes	Yes	Yes	Yes
Itch-E and Scratch-E	Yes	Yes	Yes	Yes	Yes	Yes
Sam La More	Yes	Yes	Yes	Yes	Yes	Yes
MDX	Yes	Yes	Yes	Yes	Yes	Yes
Decoder Ring	Yes	Yes	Yes	Yes	Yes	Yes
Sugar Army	Yes	Yes	Yes	Yes	Yes	Yes
The Scare	Yes	Yes	Yes	Yes	Yes	Yes
Wagons	Yes	Yes	Yes	Yes	Yes	Yes
The Middle East	Yes	Yes	Yes	No	Yes	No
Phrase	Yes	Yes	No	No	Yes	Yes
Grrillastep	Yes	Yes	No	No	Yes	No
Teleprompter	Yes	Yes	Yes	Yes	Yes	Yes
Tumbleweed^{[B]}	Yes	Yes	No	No	No	No
Blowfly	Yes	Yes	Yes	Yes	Yes	Yes
DJ Chucuchu	Yes	Yes	Yes	Yes	Yes	Yes
Matt Hall|Yes	Yes	Yes	Yes	Yes	Yes	
Poirier feat. MC Zulu	Yes	Yes	Yes	Yes	Yes	Yes
Bridgemary Kiss	Yes	No	No	No	No	No
Catcall	Yes	No	No	No	No	No
Danimals	Yes	No	No	No	No	No
DJ Ben Morris	Yes	No	No	No	No	No
DJ Mark Craven	Yes	No	No	No	No	No
DJ Mark Murphy	Yes	No	No	No	No	No
Oh Mercy	Yes	No	No	No	No	No
Regular John	Yes	No	No	No	No	No
Robbie Lowe	Yes	No	No	No	No	No
Seekae	Yes	No	No	No	No	No
Sherlock's Daughter	Yes	No	No	No	No	No
Songs	Yes	No	No	No	No	No
The Art	Yes	No	No	No	No	No
DJ Spex	Yes	No	No	No	No	No
The Crayon Fields	No	Yes	No	No	No	No
Calling All Cars	No	Yes	No	No	No	No
Dan Sultan	No	Yes	No	No	No	No
DJ Bonita	No	Yes	No	No	No	No
DJ Mafia	No	Yes	No	No	No	No
Public Opinion Afro Orchestra	No	Yes	No	No	No	No
St Helens	No	Yes	No	No	No	No
Abbe May & the Rocking Pneumonia	No	No	Yes	No	No	No
Arts Martial	No	No	Yes	No	No	No
Blue Shaddy	No	No	Yes	No	No	No
Burgerkill	No	No	Yes	No	No	No
DJ Kit Pop	No	No	Yes	No	No	No
DJ Muller	No	No	Yes	No	No	No
DJ Rekab	No	No	Yes	No	No	No
Emperors	No	No	Yes	No	No	No
Human Extinction Project	No	No	Yes	No	No	No
The Chevelles	No	No	Yes	No	No	No
The Novocaines	No	No	Yes	No	No	No
Tim and Jean	No	No	Yes	No	No	No
20th Century Graduates	No	No	No	Yes	No	No
Coerce	No	No	No	Yes	No	No
DJ Japeye	No	No	No	Yes	No	No
Femme Fatales	No	No	No	Yes	No	No
Hawks of Alba	No	No	No	Yes	No	No
Loot & Plunder	No	No	No	Yes	No	No
Poetikool Justice	No	No	No	Yes	No	No
Se Bon Ki Ra	No	No	No	Yes	No	No
Stubanga	No	No	No	Yes	No	No
The Swiss	No	No	No	Yes	No	No
The Thieves	No	No	No	Yes	No	No
Butcher Birds	No	No	No	No	Yes	No
Dallas Frasca	No	No	No	No	Yes	No
DJ Katch	No	No	No	No	Yes	No
DZ	No	No	No	No	Yes	No
I Heart Hiroshima	No	No	No	No	Yes	No
Mexico City	No	No	No	No	Yes	No
Soma Rasa	No	No	No	No	Yes	No
Surecut Kids	No	No	No	No	Yes	No
The Poor	No	No	No	No	Yes	No
Señor Tasty Taste	No	No	No	No	Yes	No
Bandicoot	No	No	No	No	No	Yes
Baticuda Sound Machine	No	No	No	No	No	Yes
Cairo Knife Fight	No	No	No	No	No	Yes
Concord Dawn	No	No	No	No	No	Yes
Deja Voodoo	No	No	No	No	No	Yes
Dick "Magik" Johnson	No	No	No	No	No	Yes
Dimmer	No	No	No	No	No	Yes
Elston Gun	No	No	No	No	No	Yes
Evil	No	No	No	No	No	Yes
Gin Wigmore	No	No	No	No	No	Yes
Head Like A Hole	No	No	No	No	No	Yes
House of Shem	No	No	No	No	No	Yes
James Duncan	No	No	No	No	No	Yes
Kidz in Space	No	No	No	No	No	Yes
KORA	No	No	No	No	No	Yes
Lord Of Tigers	No	No	No	No	No	Yes
Midnight Youth	No	No	No	No	No	Yes
Mile High	No	No	No	No	No	Yes
Minuit	No	No	No	No	No	Yes
Mountaineater	No	No	No	No	No	Yes
Nick D	No	No	No	No	No	Yes
O'Lovely	No	No	No	No	No	Yes
Opensouls	No	No	No	No	No	Yes
PNC	No	No	No	No	No	Yes
Sandy Bay Social Club	No	No	No	No	No	Yes
Tainted	No	No	No	No	No	Yes
The Checks	No	No	No	No	No	Yes
The Drab Doo Riffs	No	No	No	No	No	Yes
The Veils	No	No	No	No	No	Yes
Tim Phin	No	No	No	No	No	Yes
True Lovers	No	No	No	No	No	Yes
Tahuna Breaks	No	No	No	No	No	Yes
Valedictions	No	No	No	No	No	Yes
Beenie Man^{[B]}	Cancelled	Cancelled	Cancelled	Cancelled	Cancelled	Cancelled

Notes

- A Tumbleweed only appeared at Sydney on Saturday 23rd. - incorrect - they played Friday 22nd also on the Hot Produce stage as they did the next day Saturday 23 January 2010.
  ^{[B]}
- B Beenie Man was withdrawn from lineup by organizers.

== 2011 ==
The first line-up for the 2011 Big Day Out was officially released via the Big Day Out website at 12:01 am 28 September. The second announcement was released on 24 November and completed the 2011 line-up.

For the second year in a row Sydney held two festivals due to increasing popularity of the event.

Official line-up is as follows:

	Auckland	Gold Coast	Sydney	Melbourne	Adelaide	Perth
Tool^{[A]}	Yes	Yes	Yes	Yes	Yes	Yes
Rammstein	Yes	Yes	Yes	Yes	Yes	Yes
Iggy and the Stooges	Yes	Yes	Yes	Yes	Yes	Yes
M.I.A.	Yes	Yes	Yes	Yes	Yes	Yes
The John Butler Trio	Yes	Yes	Yes	Yes	Yes	Yes
Grinderman	Yes	Yes	Yes	Yes	Yes	Yes
The Bloody Beetroots	Yes	Yes	Yes	Yes	Yes	Yes
LCD Soundsystem	Yes	Yes	Yes	Yes	Yes	Yes
Lupe Fiasco	Yes	Yes	Yes	Yes	Yes	Yes
Deftones	Yes	Yes	Yes	Yes	Yes	Yes
The Black Keys^{[B]}	Cancelled	Cancelled	Cancelled	Cancelled	Cancelled	Cancelled
Paul Dempsey	Yes	Yes	Yes	Yes	Yes	Yes
Birds of Tokyo	Yes	Yes	Yes	Yes	Yes	Yes
Primal Scream^{[C]}	Yes	Yes	Yes	Yes	Yes	Yes
Wolfmother	Yes	Yes	Yes	Yes	Yes	Yes
Sia	Yes	Yes	Yes	Yes	Yes	Yes
The Greenhornes	Yes	Yes	Yes	Yes	Yes	Yes
Edward Sharpe & the Magnetic Zeros	Yes	Yes	Yes	Yes	Yes	Yes
Die Antwoord	Yes	Yes	Yes	Yes	Yes	Yes
Black Milk *	Yes	Yes	Yes	Yes	Yes	Yes
Plan B	Yes	Yes	Yes	Yes	Yes	Yes
Booka Shade (DJ Set)	Yes	Yes	Yes	Yes	Yes	Yes
The Naked and Famous	Yes	Yes	Yes	Yes	Yes	Yes
The Jim Jones Revue	Yes	Yes	Yes	Yes	Yes	Yes
Airbourne	Yes	Yes	Yes	Yes	Yes	Yes
Andrew W.K.	Yes	Yes	Yes	Yes	Yes	Yes
Lowrider	Yes	Yes	Yes	Yes	Yes	Yes
Cansei de Ser Sexy	Yes	Yes	Yes	Yes	Yes	Yes
Vitalic	Yes	Yes	Yes	Yes	Yes	Yes
Ratatat	Yes	Yes	Yes	Yes	Yes	Yes
Kids of 88	Yes	Yes	Yes	Yes	Yes	Yes
Crystal Castles	Yes	Yes	Yes	Yes	No	No
Angus & Julia Stone	No	Yes	Yes	Yes	Yes	Yes
Anna Lunoe	No	Yes	Yes	Yes	Yes	Yes
The Vines	No	Yes	Yes	Yes	Yes	Yes
Little Red	No	Yes	Yes	Yes	Yes	Yes
Washington	No	Yes	Yes	Yes	Yes	Yes
Bliss N Eso	No	Yes	Yes	Yes	Yes	Yes
Matt & Kim	No	Yes	Yes	Yes	Yes	Yes
Operator Please	No	Yes	Yes	Yes	Yes	Yes
Children Collide	No	Yes	Yes	Yes	Yes	Yes
PNAU	No	Yes	Yes	Yes	Yes	Yes
Gyroscope	No	Yes	Yes	Yes	Yes	Yes
Dead Letter Circus	No	Yes	Yes	Yes	Yes	Yes
Kid Kenobi & MC Shureshock	No	Yes	Yes	Yes	Yes	Yes
Will Styles	No	Yes	Yes	Yes	Yes	Yes
Gypsy & The Cat	No	Yes	Yes	Yes	Yes	Yes
Blue King Brown	No	Yes	Yes	Yes	Yes	Yes
Sampology	No	Yes	Yes	Yes	Yes	Yes
Shihad^{[D]}	Yes	No	No	No	No	No
Die! Die! Die!	Yes	No	No	No	No	No
Bulletproof	Yes	No	No	No	No	No
I Am Giant	Yes	No	No	No	No	No
Six60	Yes	No	No	No	No	No
Electric Horse	No	Yes	No	No	No	No
Street Chant	Yes	No	No	No	No	No
The Phoenix Foundation	Yes	No	No	No	No	No
Knives at Noon	Yes	No	No	No	No	No
T54	Yes	No	No	No	No	No
The Salvadors	No	No	No	No	Yes	No
Luger Boa	Yes	No	No	No	No	No
The Unfaithful Ways	Yes	No	No	No	No	No
Three Houses Down	Yes	No	No	No	No	No
Surf City	Yes	No	No	No	No	No
The Hummingbirds	Yes	No	No	No	No	No
Lynchmada	No	Yes	No	No	No	No
Oceanics	No	Yes	No	No	No	No
Barbariön	No	No	Yes	Yes	Yes	No

Notes

- A At the Adelaide performance, Tool were joined by Till Lindemann and Christoph Schneider of Rammstein for an extended performance and pyrotechnics display during Lateralus.
- B The Black Keys withdrew from the Big Day Out lineup.
- C Primal Scream appeared at all shows performing their 1991 album Screamadelica in its entirety.
- D New Zealand band Shihad performed their hit album from 1999, The General Electric in its entirety.

== 2012 ==
The lineup was announced on 29 September 2011. The first 17 artists were announced over the Big Day Out Twitter page from 8 until 10 pm. The three main headliners were announced on 30 September 2011 on Triple J. Tony Hawk was announced as a non-musical special guest.

Bold indicates headline act.

	Auckland	Gold Coast	Sydney	Melbourne	Adelaide	Perth
**Kanye West**^{[A]}	Cancelled	Yes	Yes	Yes	Cancelled	Cancelled
**Soundgarden**	Yes	Yes	Yes	Yes	Yes	Yes
Kasabian	Yes	Yes	Yes	Yes	Yes	Yes
Noel Gallagher's High Flying Birds	Yes	Yes	Yes	Yes	Yes	Yes
Nero	Yes	Yes	Yes	Yes	Yes	Yes
My Chemical Romance	Yes	Yes	Yes	Yes	Yes	Yes
The Living End	Yes	Yes	Yes	Yes	Yes	Yes
Hilltop Hoods^{[B]}	No	Yes	Yes	Yes	Yes	Cancelled
Cavalera Conspiracy	Yes	Yes	Yes	Yes	Yes	Yes
Parkway Drive	Yes	Yes	Yes	Yes	Yes	Yes
Girl Talk	Yes	Yes	Yes	Yes	Yes	Yes
Bluejuice	No	Yes	Yes	Yes	Yes	Yes
Röyksopp	Yes	Yes	Yes	Yes	Yes	Yes
Battles	Yes	Yes	Yes	Yes	Yes	Yes
The Jezabels	No	Yes	Yes	Yes	Yes	Yes
Art vs. Science	No	Yes	Yes	Yes	No	No
Bassnectar	Yes	Yes	Yes	Yes	Yes	Yes
Odd Future^{[C]}	Cancelled	Yes	Yes	Yes	Yes	Yes
Architecture In Helsinki	No	Yes	Yes	Yes	Yes	Yes
Kimbra	Yes	Yes	Yes	Yes	Yes	Yes
Regurgitator	Yes	Yes	Yes	Yes	Yes	Yes
The Vaccines	Yes	Yes	Yes	Yes	Yes	Yes
Tonite Only	No	Yes	Yes	Yes	Yes	Yes
Mariachi El Bronx	Yes	Yes	Yes	Yes	Yes	Yes
Cage The Elephant	Yes	Yes	Yes	Yes	Yes	Yes
Drapht	No	Yes	Yes	Yes	Yes	Yes
Foster The People	Yes	Yes	Yes	Yes	Yes	Yes
Frenzal Rhomb	No	Yes	Yes	Yes	Yes	Yes
The Getaway Plan	No	Yes	Yes	Yes	Yes	Yes
Papa Vs Pretty	No	Yes	Yes	Yes	No	No
Boy & Bear	No	Yes	Yes	Yes	Yes	Yes
Best Coast	Yes	Yes	Yes	Yes	Yes	Yes
Calling All Cars	No	Yes	Yes	Yes	No	No
Abbe May	No	Yes	Yes	Yes	Yes	Yes
ShockOne	No	Yes	Yes	Yes	Yes	Yes
Das Racist	Yes	Yes	Yes	Yes	Yes	No
Miss Kittin	No	Yes	Yes	Yes	No	No
T-Rek	No	Yes	Yes	Yes	No	No
King Cannons	No	Yes	Yes	Yes	No	No
The Amity Affliction	No	Yes	Yes	Yes	No	No
Faker	No	Yes	Yes	Yes	No	No
Stonefield	No	Yes	Yes	Yes	No	No
Kitty, Daisy & Lewis	No	Yes	Yes	Yes	No	No
I Am Giant	Yes	No	No	No	No	No
The Adults	Yes	No	No	No	No	No
Midnight Youth	Yes	No	No	No	No	No
The Adults	Yes	No	No	No	No	No
Lets Not Pretend	Yes	No	No	No	No	No
Cut Off Your Hands	Yes	No	No	No	No	No
Mt Eden	Yes	No	No	No	No	No
Cut Off Your Hands	Yes	No	No	No	No	No
Cairo Knife Fight	Yes	No	No	No	No	No
Gin Wigmore	Yes	No	No	No	No	No
Six60	Yes	No	No	No	No	No
Unknown Mortal Orchestra	Yes	No	No	No	No	No
David Dallas	Yes	No	No	No	No	No
Beastwars	Yes	No	No	No	No	No
Bulletproof	Yes	No	No	No	No	No
Ghostwave	Yes	No	No	No	No	No
MayaVanya	Yes	No	No	No	No	No
Sir-Vere	Yes	No	No	No	No	No
Junica	Yes	No	No	No	No	No
Nick D	Yes	No	No	No	No	No
@Peace	Yes	No	No	No	No	No
Jakob	Yes	No	No	No	No	No
The Bronx	No	No	No	No	Yes	Yes
Grind Time Now	No	No	No	Yes	No	No
Grinspoon	No	No	Yes	No	No	No
The Brow	No	No	No	No	No	Yes
The Blackwater Fever	No	Yes	No	No	No	No
Tony Hawk^{[D]}	Yes	Yes	Yes	Yes	Yes	Yes

Notes

- **A** Kanye West was originally announced to play all shows, but was later withdrawn from the Auckland, Perth and Adelaide line-ups.
- **B** Hilltop Hoods were withdrawn from the Perth show.
- **C** Odd Future were withdrawn from the Auckland show after complaints concerning their homophobic lyrics. They still performed in Auckland, playing a sideshow at the Powerstation the night before.
- **D** Tony Hawk appeared at all Big Day Out festivals in 2012 performing skate demonstrations.

== 2013 ==
The first lineup was announced at midnight on 16 July. The Red Hot Chili Peppers were announced shortly before the first lineup announcement. Lucha VaVOOM was announced as a non-musical special guest.

Bold indicates headline act.

	Sydney	Gold Coast	Adelaide	Melbourne	Perth
**Red Hot Chili Peppers**	Yes	Yes	Yes	Yes	Yes
**The Killers**	Yes	Yes	Yes	Yes	Yes
Yeah Yeah Yeahs	Yes	Yes	Yes	Yes	Yes
Vampire Weekend	Yes	Yes	Yes	Yes	Yes
The Bloody Beetroots (Live)	Yes	Yes	Yes	Yes	Yes
Kaskade	Yes	Yes	Cancelled	Cancelled	Cancelled
Animal Collective	Yes	Yes	Yes	Yes	Yes
Band of Horses	Yes	Yes	Yes	Yes	Yes
B.o.B	Yes	Yes	Yes	Yes	Yes
Sleigh Bells	Yes	Yes	Yes	Yes	Yes
Foals	Yes	Yes	Yes	Yes	Yes
Alabama Shakes	Yes	Yes	Yes	Yes	Yes
360	Yes	Yes	Yes	Yes	Yes
Crystal Castles	Yes	Yes	Yes	Yes	Yes
Pretty Lights	Yes	Yes	Yes	Yes	Yes
Off!	Yes	Yes	Yes	Yes	Yes
Grinspoon	Yes	Yes	Yes	Yes	Yes
BT	Yes	Yes	Yes	Yes	Yes
Against Me!	Yes	Yes	Yes	Yes	Yes
Gary Clark, Jr.	Yes	Yes	Yes	Yes	Yes
Nicky Romero	Yes	Yes	Yes	Yes	Cancelled
Morgan Page	Yes	Yes	Yes	Yes	Yes
Logo	Yes	Yes	Yes	Yes	Yes
Every Time I Die	Yes	Yes	Yes	Yes	Yes
Delta Spirit	Yes	Yes	Yes	Yes	Yes
Childish Gambino	Yes	Yes	Yes	Yes	Yes
ME	Yes	Yes	Yes	Yes	Yes
Hunting Grounds	Yes	Yes	Yes	Yes	Yes
JEFF the Brotherhood	Yes	Yes	Yes	Yes	Yes
Death Grips	Yes	Yes	Yes	Yes	Yes
Adventure Club	Yes	Yes	Yes	Yes	Yes
Jagwar Ma	Yes	Yes	Yes	Yes	Yes
House Vs. Hurricane	Yes	Yes	Yes	Yes	Yes
Avalanche City	Yes	Yes	Yes	Yes	Yes
Toucan	Yes	Yes	Yes	Yes	Yes
Helena	Yes	Yes	Yes	Yes	Yes
Nina Las Vegas	Yes	Yes	Yes	Yes	Yes
Sampology	Yes	Yes	Yes	Yes	Yes
Compressorhead	Yes	Yes	Yes	Yes	Yes
The Medics	Yes	Yes	Yes	Yes	Yes
Something With Numbers	Yes	No	No	No	No
Urthboy	Yes	No	No	No	No
Thy Art Is Murder	Yes	No	No	No	No
Deep Sea Arcade	Yes	No	No	No	No
Royal Headache	Yes	No	No	No	No
Chance Waters	Yes	No	No	No	No
Good Heavens	Yes	No	No	No	No
Stereogamous	Yes	No	No	No	No
The Griswolds	Yes	No	No	No	No
Fishing	Yes	No	No	No	No
The Gooch Palms	Yes	No	No	No	No
Donny Benet	Yes	No	No	No	No
Jackie Onassis	Yes	No	No	No	No
Bob Log III	Yes	Yes	No	Yes	No
Dead Letter Circus	No	Yes	No	No	No
I Heart Hiroshima	No	Yes	No	No	No
The Cairos	No	Yes	No	No	No
Hey Geronimo	No	Yes	No	No	No
We All Want To	No	Yes	No	No	No
Evil Eddie	No	Yes	No	No	No
Skinwalkers	No	Yes	No	No	No
Dave's Pawn Shop	No	Yes	No	No	No
Lily Rouge	No	Yes	No	No	No
The Vernons	No	Yes	No	No	No
Sneaky Picnic	No	Yes	No	No	No
Jakarta Criers	No	Yes	No	No	No
Paul Mac	No	Yes	Yes	No	No
The Beards	No	No	Yes	No	No
Grey Ghost	No	No	Yes	No	No
The Killgirls	No	No	Yes	No	No
Full Tote Odds	No	No	Yes	No	No
Messrs	No	No	Yes	No	No
Allday	No	No	Yes	No	No
Lady Strangelove	No	No	Yes	No	No
Steering By Stars	No	No	Yes	No	No
Sincerely, Grizzly	No	No	Yes	No	No
Stab Capital	No	No	Yes	No	No
Gemini Downs	No	No	Yes	No	No
Archers	No	No	Yes	No	No
Dr Piffle & The Burlap Band	No	No	Yes	No	No
The Aves	No	No	Yes	No	No
Bodyjar	No	No	No	Yes	No
Seth Sentry	No	No	No	Yes	No
The Smith Street Band	No	No	No	Yes	No
Kingswood	No	No	No	Yes	No
Yung Warriors	No	No	No	Yes	No
Money For Rope	No	No	No	Yes	No
Jackson Firebird	No	No	No	Yes	No
Split Seconds	No	No	No	Yes	No
For Our Hero	No	No	No	Yes	No
Generik	No	No	No	Yes	No
Zanzibar Chanel	No	No	No	Yes	No
The Stiffys	No	No	No	Yes	No
Apes	No	No	No	Yes	No
Chicks On Speed DJ Show	No	No	No	Yes	Yes
Sugar Army	No	No	No	No	Yes
Emperors	No	No	No	No	Yes
The Chemist	No	No	No	No	Yes
Sons of Rico	No	No	No	No	Yes
Further Earth	No	No	No	No	Yes
Arts Martial	No	No	No	No	Yes
Rainy Day Women	No	No	No	No	Yes
Boys Boys Boys!	No	No	No	No	Yes
The Love Junkies	No	No	No	No	Yes
Skank MC	No	No	No	No	Yes
Dead Owls	No	No	No	No	Yes
Tomàs Ford	No	No	No	No	Yes
Foam	No	No	No	No	Yes
DJ Keyno	No	Yes	No	No	No
Phetsta	No	No	No	No	Yes

Kaskade cancelled Adelaide, Melbourne, and Perth on the festival. Nicky Romero cancelled Perth, but instead played the first four shows on the 2013 tour.

== 2014 ==
The first lineup was announced at 8:00 pm AEST on 31 July.

Bold indicates headline act.

	Auckland	Gold Coast	Melbourne	Sydney	Adelaide	Perth
**Pearl Jam**	Yes	Yes	Yes	Yes	Yes	Yes
**Arcade Fire**	Yes	Yes	Yes	Yes	Yes	Yes
**Blur^{[A]}**	Cancelled	Cancelled	Cancelled	Cancelled	Cancelled	Cancelled
Snoop Dogg	Yes	Yes	Yes	Yes	Yes	Yes
Major Lazer	Yes	Yes	Yes	Yes	Yes	Yes
Steve Angello	Yes	Yes	Yes	Yes	Yes	Yes
Flume	No	Yes	Yes	Yes	Yes	Yes
Beady Eye	Yes	Yes	Yes	Yes	Yes	Yes
The Lumineers	Yes	Yes	Yes	Yes	Yes	Yes
Primus	Yes	Yes	Yes	Yes	Yes	Yes
Tame Impala	Yes	Yes	Yes	Yes	Yes	Yes
Vista Chino	No	Yes	Yes	Yes	Yes	Yes
The Hives	Yes	Yes	Yes	Yes	Yes	Yes
Deftones	Yes	Yes	Yes	Yes	Yes	Yes
Bliss N Eso	No	Yes	Yes	Yes	No	Yes
CSS	Yes	Yes	Yes	Yes	Yes	Yes
The Drones	No	Yes	Yes	Yes	Yes	Yes
Mac Miller	Yes	Yes	Yes	Yes	Yes	Yes
Flosstradamus	Yes	Yes	Yes	Yes	Yes	Yes
Ghost	Yes	Yes	Yes	Yes	Yes	Yes
Grouplove	Yes	Yes	Yes	Yes	Yes	Yes
The Naked and Famous	Yes	Yes	Yes	Yes	Yes	Yes
Dillon Francis	Yes	Yes	Yes	Yes	Yes	Yes
Toro Y Moi	Yes	Yes	Yes	Yes	Yes	Yes
Bluejuice	Yes	Yes	Yes	Yes	Yes	Yes
Portugal. The Man	Yes	Yes	Yes	Yes	Yes	Yes
Mudhoney	Yes	Yes	Yes	Yes	Yes	Yes
DIIV^{[B]}	Cancelled	Cancelled	Cancelled	Cancelled	Cancelled	Cancelled
The 1975	Yes	Yes	Yes	Yes	Yes	Yes
PEZ	No	Yes	Yes	Yes	Yes	Yes
Kerser	No	Yes	Yes	Yes	Yes	Yes
Northlane	No	Yes	Yes	Yes	Yes	Yes
Big Gigantic	No	Yes	Yes	Yes	Yes	Yes
Cosmic Psychos ^{[C]}	No	Yes	Yes	Yes	Yes	Yes
Loon Lake	No	Yes	Yes	Yes	Yes	Yes
Kingswood	No	Yes	Yes	Yes	Yes	Yes
Bo Ningen	No	Yes	Yes	Yes	Yes	Yes
RÜFÜS	No	Yes	Yes	Yes	Yes	Yes
The Algorithm	No	Yes	Yes	Yes	Yes	Yes
DZ Deathrays	No	Yes	Yes	Yes	Yes	Yes
Peking Duk	No	Yes	Yes	Yes	Yes	Yes
Violent Soho	No	Yes	Yes	Yes	Yes	Yes
The Jungle Giants	No	Yes	Yes	Yes	Yes	Yes
All The Colours	No	Yes	Yes	Yes	Yes	Yes
Ben Morris	No	Yes	Yes	Yes	Yes	Yes
360	No	No	No	No	Yes	No
The Phoenix Foundation	Yes	No	No	No	No	No
Villainy	Yes	No	No	No	No	No
SJD	Yes	No	No	No	No	No
P-Money	Yes	No	No	No	No	No
Beastwars	Yes	No	No	No	No	No
Concord Dawn	Yes	No	No	No	No	No
Clap Clap Riot	Yes	No	No	No	No	No
Pleaseplease	Yes	No	No	No	No	No
Kody Nielson	Yes	No	No	No	No	No
DPRTRCLB	Yes	No	No	No	No	No
Randa	Yes	No	No	No	No	No
Prowler	Yes	No	No	No	No	No
From The Dunes	No	No	No	No	No	Yes

Notes

- **A** Blur withdrew from the lineup due to 'shifting goalposts'
- **B** DIIV cancelled all their international dates due to recording commitments
- **C** With no event in 2015, Cosmic Psychos are the only band to play both the first Big Day Out and the last.

== 2015 ==
There was no Big Day Out in 2015. It was announced on 26 June 2014 that the 2015 Big Day Out had been cancelled. The announcement came after long-running speculation over the future of the summer festival and revelations the day before from Sydney Showground executives that festival organisers had cancelled their 2015 venue booking.
