= The Lookie Loos =

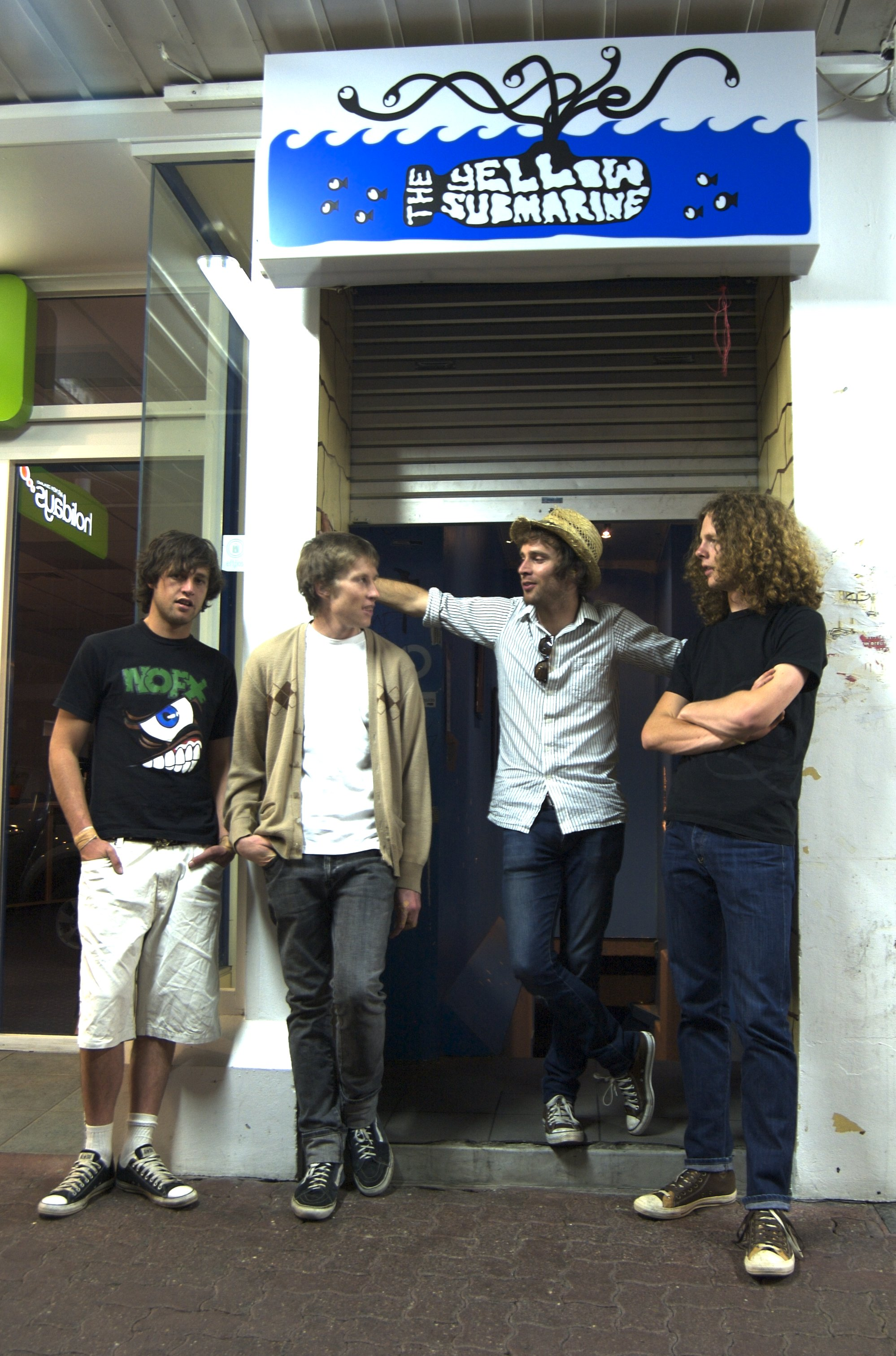

Background information
- Origin: Hamilton, New Zealand
- Genres: Pop; Rock
- Years active: 2005– present
- Label: The Lookie Loos
- Members: Tim Steers; Alex Mustard; Daniel Reese; William Page
- Website: Official website

The Lookie Loos are a New Zealand rock band formed in 2005 at the Waikato Institute of Technology in Hamilton.

The two founding members, guitarist & vocalist Tim Steers and bassist Alex Mustard, met while studying. Steers moved from the U.K. to study music in New Zealand and Mustard came from Waihi to study sports.

The first full line up of the Lookie Loos saw the addition of American drummer Joe Gruber. The three-piece began playing live in Auckland and Hamilton in as many venues as they could find. After recording some demos and playing live for six months, the band was due to release an EP towards the end of 2006, but were delayed by the news that their drummer had to return to the U.S.

At the start of 2007, the band continued to work on the EP while trying to find new members of the band. The addition of lead guitarist Daniel Reese and drummer William Page made the band a four-piece. After some time working on the sound of the band and re-arranging the songs to fit the new lineup, the band began playing live once again. They continued touring, playing with groups such as The Coshercot Honeys, Fighting the Shakes and The Veils.

The Lookie Loos stopped all shows once again when bassist Alex Mustard suffered a severe injury to his left hand. After a short hiatus, the band resumed performing with the help of Adam Page, bassist for Sunny Tokyo, to play in Mustard's absence. Mustard eventually returned in time for the release of their EP.

The Lookie Loos wrote, recorded and engineered their debut EP, Timing Is Everything over a 3-month period at the Waikato Institute of Technology. They have since gone on to play at The Big Day Out in 2008 and have become known for their British-influenced pop rock.
