= MU (musician) =

British musician

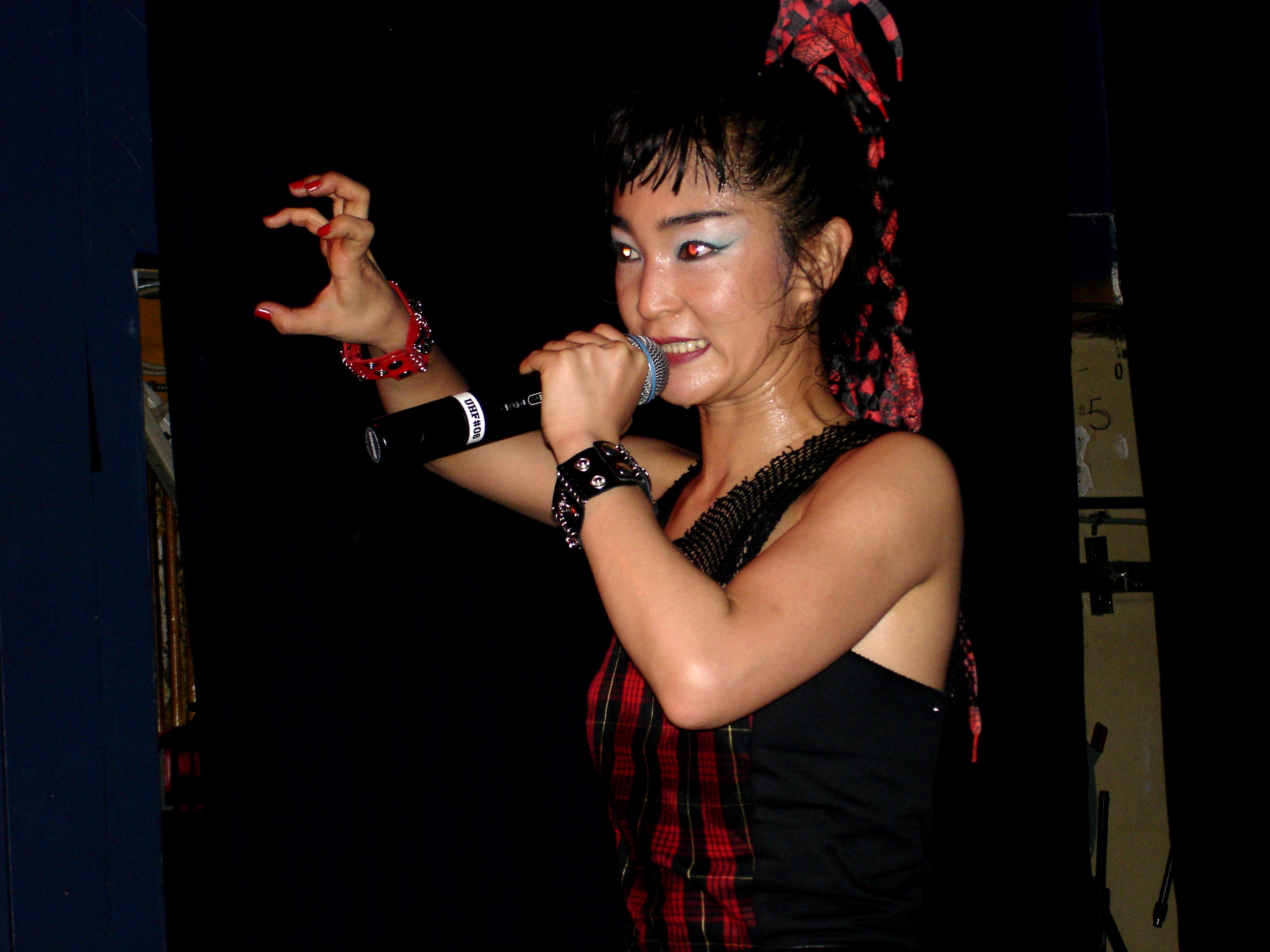
- Mutsumi Kanamori performing in Los Angeles in 2005

Background information
- Origin: Sheffield, England
- Genres: Electronic; Electropunk
- Years active: 2003-present
- Labels: Tigersushi, Output, BubbleTease Communications
- Members: Mutsumi Kanamori
- Website: www.myspace.com/mutsumiakamu

MU is British electropunk musician Mutsumi Kanamori and is produced by Maurice Fulton. They have released three albums: Afro Finger and Gel, Out of Breach (Manchester's Revenge), which featured the minor hit "Paris Hilton" and Mu. Their debut album received critical acclaim from Pitchfork Media. It was given the "Best New Award" when first released. In 2010, Mutsumi announced that they would go by Mutsumi rather than "Mu" and that their first album in five years was in the works. Their third, self-titled album was released digitally on 31 October 2010 with a CD release following in 2011.
