= Nik Fish =

- Birth name: Nik Vatoff
- Also known as: Nik Fish
- Origin: Australia
- Genres: Hardstyle, Trance
- Occupation(s): Disc jockey Record producer
- Website: http://www.nikfish.dj/

Sydney born Nik Fish is an Australian DJ.

Nik Fish's position as a leading Australian DJ is reinforced by his skill, determination, drive, passion and many years of hard work. His career began on radio in the early 90s as a presenter of his own dance music show called 'Musiquarium'. He was a major player in the original rave scene in the 90s playing alongside Carl Cox, The Prodigy and other artists from this era.

== Career ==
He has played various musical genres including Hip Hop, House, Rave and Trance but is now championing the harder dance styles. Nik has established a cult following with a massive fanbase that sees him regularly headlining clubs, raves and festivals all around the nation.

He has also represented Australia internationally, performing at Defqon.1 Festival Holland (2010), the Berlin Loveparade street party (2006) and has played throughout Asia, Germany, UK and New Zealand.

Nik is based in Sydney where he was a resident DJ for sublime at home nightclub for over 13 years. He's now resident DJ at Harder Styles United; a monthly Hardstyle club night and also at impulse and masif, a weekly hard dance club night. He also features at large scale local events like Defqon.1 Festival (Australia), Utopia and other raves as well.

In 2008 Nik was invited to play as support DJ for the first Q-Dance events in both Sydney and Melbourne.

In 2009 Nik performed at the Defqon1 Festival in Sydney on the Orange Hardtrance stage and also at UK club brand, Cream supporting Ferry Corsten as well as for Future Entertainment Winter Sound System Festival in Melbourne and Future Music Festival in Sydney.

In 2010 Nik played on the Orange stage at Defqon.1 Festival Holland and also on the main (Red) stage at Defqon.1 Festival Australia.

Nik compiled and mixed the official Defqon.1 Festival Australia 2010 CD compilation, which featured local artist tracks and toured all around the country to promote it and the Defqon.1 Festival brand.

Throughout his career Nik has released numerous mix compilation albums for labels such as Ministry of Sound (HARD NRG series), Central Station Records (CENTRAL ENERGY) as well as many other titles for various independent music labels.

Nik is currently producing Hardstyle tracks.

== Discography ==
=== Charting singles ===
List of singles, with selected chart positions
| Title | Year | Peak chart positions |
| Title | Year | AUS |
|---|---|---|
| "The Winner Is..." (with Southend) | 1994 | 9 |
| "The Winner Is...2000" (with Southend) | 2000 | 69 |
