= The Monarchs =

American doo-wop band

The Monarchs are an American doo-wop band from Louisville, Kentucky, formed in 1961. They are known mainly for their 1964 recording of "Look Homeward Angel". This single went to #47 on the Billboard Hot 100 and also reached #1 on local and regional charts. Their first recording was "Over The Mountain" recorded in 1962 and released on the Reegal Label. "This Old Heart" by James Brown, was recorded in 1963 and topped local charts. In 1965 they recorded and released "Climb Every Mountain" on the Sound Stage 7 label.

By 1967, the original Monarchs began to lose members, but with varied lineups the band continued to perform remaining true to their original doo-wop sound and vocal harmonies. Former Louisville mayor Jerry Abramson called them "Louisville's Musical Ambassadors". Today The Monarchs still perform in the Louisville area.
