= Clowns of Decadence =

Australian rock and punk band

- Origin: Adelaide, South Australia, Australia
- Genres: rock, punk, circus
- Years active: 1988–1998
- Labels: Homegrown, Siren
- Past members: Mark Fenech; Stephen Hards; Matt Jonsson; Colin Morris; Craig Spencer; Craig Stone; Ben James; Chris Lambert

Clowns of Decadence were an Australian rock, punk band from Adelaide, South Australia, which formed in 1988 and deployed elements of circus music and performance. The group released three extended plays and an album, Clowns of a Lesser God (1994) on Homegrown Artists / Siren Records before disbanding in 1998.

== Biography ==
Clowns of Decadence formed in 1988 in Adelaide as a rock, punk band deploying elements of circus music and performance. They included three members of Festered Vestoons and one from Toxic Avengers, by June 1990 they were named as Clowns of Decadence and had "adopted a performance image of wearing clown makeup and silly clothes to back up their politico-protest leanings". They toured interstate with gigs in Sydney and Melbourne.

In 1993 the group issued a four-track extended play on Homegrown Artists, Kamikaze Karnival. The disc was produced by Tony Nesci and recorded at his studios. One of the tracks, "Alien Sex Romp", was co-written by Mark Fenech, Stephen Hards (JJ Hi-jinx/Hardsy), Matt Jonsson (Trolla Bolla Snatcha Razoo), Colin Morris, Craig Spencer (Cappo Skum-fakir/Spako Airhead) and Craig Stone. By 1994 they released a second EP, Dirty Tricks Incorporated, on Siren Records, with five tracks including "Snake Like a Tongue". The latter track appeared on a various artists' compilation album, Lot's: The CD (1994), which was included with Lot's Wife, a student newspaper at Monash University.

In 1995 they released Too Ugly for Airplay, a four-track EP including "New Age Neurotic". It was produced by Mick Wordley, Evan James and the Clowns of Decadence; and recorded at Mixmasters Studios. Clowns of a Lesser God followed in 1996, it was a full-length studio album.

By 1998 the group had disbanded, Hards and Spencer joined alternate rock group, Jonny Don't Play. In June 2012, Fenech, Jonsson and Stone registered the name "Clowns of Decadence" as a music entertainment service.

In 2025, lead vocalist and frontman Ocker Bozo died after a 14-month battle with bone cancer.

== Members ==
As credited on the 1994 album, Dirty Tricks Incorporated

- Stephen Hards a.k.a. JJ Hi-Jinx a.k.a. Hardsy – saxophone, clarinet, fire blowhard
- Matt Jonsson a.k.a. Trolla Bolla Snatcha Razoo – drums, art, mad ravings & bizarre facial contortions
- Craig Spencer a.k.a. Cappo Skum-fakir a.k.a. Spako Airhead – bass guitar, guitar, vocals, clown co-ordination
- Mark Fenech a.k.a. Ocker Bozo (vocals, trumpet, excess)
- Craig Stone a.k.a. Lord Stingy (guitars, pyromania, penny pinching)
- Colin Morris a.k.a. Reverend Spud McGeek (piano, synth, vocals, Guinness)
- Ben James a.k.a. Marshall Benzene – bass guitar, fire cadet, stilt walker (1993 –1998)
- Chris Lambert a.k.a. Doc Boom (Bass guitar) (1998-onwards)

== Discography ==
=== Albums ===
- Clowns of a Lesser God (1996)

=== Extended plays ===
- Kamikaze Karnival (1993)
- Dirty Tricks Incorporated (1994)
- Too Ugly for Airplay (1995)

=== Other appearances ===
- "Big Green Couch of Hope" (on compilation album [Grind Em Down - 1992)
- "If Pain Could Turn to Gold" (on compilation album Let's Make Cents)
- "New Age Neurotic" (on compilation album Triple M Presents on the Edge of the World - 1995)
