= Infected (band) =

Australian metal band

iNFeCTeD
- Also known as: Plague
- Origin: Perth, Western Australia, Australia
- Genres: Industrial death metal
- Years active: 1992–1996, 2003, 2008–2009
- Labels: Shock/Thrust
- Past members: James Campbell; Matthew Jefferson; Joe Kapiteyn; Gareth Morris; Bjorg Saetre; Robert Thorpe; Andrew Wright

Infected (typeset as iNFeCTeD) were an industrial death metal band from Perth, Western Australia, which formed in 1992 with James Campbell on bass guitar, Matthew Jefferson on guitar, Joe Kapiteyn on vocals and Gareth Morris on drums. They issued two studio albums, Crawlspace (1993) and Control (1995) before disbanding in 1996. They briefly reformed in 2003 and again during 2008–2009.

== History ==
Infected were formed as a death metal band in 1992 in Perth by James Campbell on bass guitar, Matthew Jefferson on lead guitar, Joe Kapiteyn on lead vocals and Gareth Morris on drums. After two self-released extended plays as cassettes, Winter (1992) and Prick (1993), they signed with Shock Records's metal offshoot label, Thrust Records. They issued their debut studio album, Crawlspace (December 1993), which they promoted by touring Australia from April 1994. Norwegian-born Bjorg Saetre joined the band on keyboards in early 1995. Their second studio album, Control, was released in April of that year and they followed with another Australian tour.

Infected supported international acts Morbid Angel, Fear Factory, Pungent Stench and Carcass on their tours of Australia. In 1996 Infected released another cassette EP, Trial, and broke up in September of that year. Infected briefly reformed in 2003 to record a new EP, StraightWhiteGod, with Robert Thorpe on keyboards. They reunited again in 2008 with Andrew Wright on keyboards. After another shorter period of inactivity, 2009 saw the band play a Halloween show in Perth in support of a re-release of their debut album Crawlspace through Western Australian label Prime Cuts Music.

== Members ==
- James Campbell – bass guitar (1992–1996, 2003, 2008–2009)
- Matthew Jefferson – guitar (1992–1996, 2003, 2008–2009)
- Joe Kapiteyn – vocals (1992–1996, 2003, 2008–2009)
- Gareth Morris – drums (1992–1996, 2003, 2008–2009)
- Bjorg Saetre – keyboards (1995–1996)
- Robert Thorpe – keyboards (2003)
- Andrew Wright – keyboards (2008)

== Discography ==
Albums

- Crawlspace (December 1993) Shock/Thrust
  - Crawlspace (Prime Cuts Music, 2009 re-release)
- Control (April 1995) Shock/Thrust

Extended plays

- Winter (1992)
- Prick (February 1993) Wild Rags
- Trial (1996)
- StraightWhiteGod (2003) Independent
