= The Blackwater Fever =

Australian band

- Origin: Brisbane, Queensland, Australia
- Genres: alternative rock, alt rock, rock, blues rock, garage rock, garage blues, punk blues, indie rock, blues, grunge, garage, roots
- Years active: 2005–present
- Labels: Independent, Waterfront, Plus One, P-Vine
- Members: Shane Hicks; Trevor Gee; Sean Thomas
- Past members: Jed Walters; Jared Tredly; Andrew Walter; Rick DeMarco
- Website: theblackwaterfever.com

The Blackwater Fever are an Australian blues guitar-drums band, formed in Brisbane, Queensland in 2005. They were awarded Best Blues & Roots Act at the 2006 Sunshine Coast Music Festival. They issued their debut five-track extended play, Abused Blues, in January 2006 by the founding duo of Shane Hicks on vocals and guitar; and Rick DeMarco on drums. The tracks had been recorded live-in-the-studio at OPM Studios, Brisbane. Hicks and DeMarco co-wrote "Blackwater", which provided the band's name, Hicks later recalled "[we were] brain storming for a band name we were having a hell of a time trying to come up with something. One of the first guitar/drums songs we wrote together was called ‘Blackwater’ and it’s about people catching a fever from drinking tainted water. Put all that together and you have our band name! We found out later that it was a term for severe malaria…. And because we were going for a dark swampy bluesy sound, we thought…. Perfect!"

By 2008 The Blackwater Fever had gained national radio exposure from youth radio station Triple J, on the Home & Hosed (October) and Roots 'n' All (November) segments, and from that station's Unearthed competition for new unsigned bands. In November 2008 they released their debut studio album, Sweet Misery, where DeMarco had been replaced by Andrew Walter on drums.

By late 2010 the line-up was a trio with Hicks and Walter joined by Jed A. Walters on bass guitar and keyboards. However their second album, In Stereo (June 2011), had been recorded before Walters had joined, "[Jed] didn't contribute to this album but he'll definitely be making a big contribution to the next one." Their third album, The Depths, appeared in March 2013. Luke Saunders of Reverb Street Press compared it with the previous two albums "[its] another intriguing step forward following the solid foundations the band laid on their dark and gritty debut, Sweet Misery (2009) and its more refined, equally accomplished follow-up, In Stereo (2011)."

== Critical reception ==
Radio station, PBS 106.7FM reviewer described Sweet Misery as including a "harrowing growl, a tortured electric guitar and the rhythmic stomp of an unrelenting drum kit. If you close your eyes you can almost smell the swamp and feel the moonlight on your face... Breaking your heart one minute only to pick you up with an irresistible rocker the next."

2023 Bio: Whether it’s the prog-rock, hypnotic slow burning opus Angler… The poetic, atmospheric imagery of murder ballad’s Ode To Ol’ John Doe and If You Only Knew… the late night rock n’ roll drive of Love Is Strange, or the punk/ grunge molotov cocktail of Everything Always. This is an album packed tight with creative hooks, sharp turns and dynamism. The Blackwater Fever’s 6th studio album, sees the power trio leapfrogging genres with their distinctive sonic aesthetic.

“DARK RIVER OF VITRIOLIC ROCK ’N’ ROLL” – TIME OFF

A thunderous, tortured electric guitar rips through the room. An organ spins a heavy swirl, like some wicked preacher summoning his devilish church. The rhythmic stomp of an unrelenting drum kit rattles you down to the bone marrow, and if you close your eyes… you can almost smell the swamp and feel the moonlight on your face. It’s hard to believe such an atmospheric, blues-heavy storm could come from these 3 unassuming dudes. Breaking your heart one minute with a harrowing growl, only to pick you up with an irresistible rocker the next, this Brisbane based blues-rock trio are a live experience not to be missed.

“AN AUTHENTIC SLAP OF GRIME, MUD & HOPELESS REGRET” – JB HI-FI

“A TRUE RAW ESSENCE!” – FASTERLOUDER

“DARK RIVER OF VITRIOLIC ROCK ’N’ ROLL”– Time Off Magazine

Highlights: - 3.2+ million on Spotify. Added to 51,000+ playlists. - Opened for The Black Keys, Clutch, The Hu, Truckfighters, Tame Impala, Violent Soho, Heavy Trash, Birds of Tokyo. - Festivals played: The Big Day Out, Blues Fest, Peats Ridge, Festival of the Sun, Valley Fiesta. - Music featured on HBO, Fox, ABC, UFC, Discovery Channel networks. Included on the soundtrack for Benetton and Quiksilver campaigns, and feature films The ‘Tunnel’, ‘The Crossing’ and most recently Showtime series ‘Shameless’.

== Members ==
Current members

- Shane Hicks - lead vocals, guitar (2005–present)
- Trevor Gee - drums, backing vocals, (2020–present)
- Sean Thomas - keyboards, bass guitar, backing vocals, (2022–present)

Past members

- Jed A. Walters - keyboards, bass guitar (2010–2022)
- Jared Tredly - drums (2015–2018)
- Andrew Walter - drums (2007–2014)
- Rick DeMarco - drums (2005–2007)

== Discography ==
- Abused Blues EP (2006)
- Sweet Misery Album (2008)
- In Stereo Album (2011)
- The Depths Album (2013)
- Sweet Misery [remixed & remastered] Album (2017)
- In Stereo [remixed & remastered] Album (2017)
- Girl Beatles Cover (2017)
- Delusions Album (2018)
- Delusions B-Sides EP (2018)
- In Stereo B-Sides Album (2019)
- Temptator! Album (2022)
- Live At Eatons Hill Hotel 2022 Album (2023)
