= Cinema Prague =

Australian musical group

- Origin: Perth, Western Australia
- Genre: Funk metal
- Years active: 1986–1998, 2007, 2009–present
- Labels: Proton; Seeing Ear Records
- Members: George Kailis; Tim Lowe; Roy Martinez
- Past members: Rex Horan
- Website: http://www.cinemaprague.com

Cinema Prague were an Australian funk metal band, formed in Perth in 1986.

They combined humour, funk, thrash and Zappa-esque arrangements and were contemporaries of other Western Australian bands such as Jebediah or Beaverloop.

== Biography ==
Initially formed as a four piece in 1986, when some of the members were still at high school, the band had little success to start with. Kailis went to South Perth Primary School, whilst Lowe and Horan went to Attadale Primary School. Horan went on to Perth Modern School participating in their music programme, whilst Lowe and Kailis attended Applecross Senior High School.

By early 1988, after some member and name shuffling, the three-piece band, Cinema Prague came into existence. In 1990 the band undertook their first tour of the eastern states of Australia. Their debut recording was a cassette-single with the songs "Mushroom Cloud" and "Walking Song", released in November 1991. It was followed much later by their debut album, Meldatype, which was recorded between 1992 and 1994 and released in March 1995. The band's next release was a five track EP, ¡Zasph! which was released in November 1996. Cinema Prague's third album, Nordensort, was released in May 1998 although it was actually recorded in June/July 1995.

In 1997, after returning from Perth following their 'Idiots Crusade' tour of Europe and South Africa they recorded three tracks "We are the Moo Moo", "The Curse of the Shiny Head" and "Bacon and Eggs Part Two" at Poons Head Studio. The band's fourth album It's Schnapster, although recorded in 1990, was released in December 1998 whilst the band was in hiatus. Horan having headed to Britain, where he still performs as well as runs musical workshops for under-age offenders in prisons.

Kailis and Lowe played together in various projects, including Rice. They also undertook further studies, with Lowe studying engineering and Kailis studying architecture.

In 2007 they re-formed for a show with a new bassist Roy Martinez (Dave Mann Collective) and a plan was hatched to release the old recordings as part of a new album, Snakes Alive, the band's first in over eight years.

The disc was something we just had. I didn't think we would ever put it out. George would probably tell you we were always goona do it, but I can't say that. It was a little frustrating because it was the best recording we have done and it actually captured the way we sound.

— Tim Lowe

Snakes Alive was released on 30 January 2009. In an interview at the time, Kailis indicated that the band was planning to work on the new album.

We’ve actually still got enough material for another couple of albums – songs that were never recorded – there's no shortage of material.

— George Kailis

In support of the album's release the band gave a number of performances in Perth and Melbourne in early 2009.

As of May 2019 Cinema Prague's discography is now available on Bandcamp. In July 2019 the band reformed for a sold-out show at Fremantle Town Hall as part of the Fremantle Festival.

=== Members ===
- Rex Horan – bass, vocals (1988–1998, 2019)
- George Kailis – guitar, vocals (1988–1998, 2007, 2009–present)
- Tim Lowe – drums (1988–1998, 2007, 2009–present)
- Roy Martinez – bass (2007 - 2009)

== Discography ==
=== Albums/EPs ===
- Meldatype – Seeing Ear Records (March 1995)
- ¡Zasph! – Seeing Ear Records (November 1996)
- Nordensost (May 1998)
- It's Schnapster (December 1998)
- Snakes Alive (30 January 2009)

=== Singles ===
- "Mushroom Cloud" / "Walking Song" – Proton (November 1991) (cassette single)
