= Severed Heads discography =

- Studio albums: 24
- Extended plays: 3
- Soundtrack albums: 1
- Compilation albums: 14
- Singles: 14
- Video albums: 8
- Music videos: 7
- Split albums: 1

This is a discography of releases from the Australian experimental band Severed Heads. Since their creation in 1979, the group has released 23 studio albums, 1 split album, 14 compilation albums, 1 soundtrack, 3 extended plays, 14 singles, and 8 home video releases. The group's 1984 single "Dead Eyes Opened" (from their 1983 album Since the Accident) peaked at number 16 on the Australian ARIA Charts when remixed and re-issued in 1994, and singles from their 1989 album Rotund for Success, "Greater Reward" and "All Saints Day", both charted on Billboard's Top Dance Tracks charts at numbers 19 and 25, respectively.

In 2008, Tom Ellard announced that the Severed Heads project has dissolved; however, the group has done reunion tours since 2011.

== Albums ==
=== Studio albums ===
Year	Album details	Comments
1980	Ear Bitten/No Vowels, No Bowels: Released: July 1980; Label: Terse Tapes; Format: LP	Split album with The Rhythmx Chymx. All covers included artwork done by hand by both artists. A sum of the copies were lost from a fire at the house of Richard Fieldings, and all surviving copies were sold in plain white sleeves.
1980	Side 2: Released: 1980; Label: Terse Tapes; Format: C90	Initially released in 1980 through Terse Tapes as a C90 cassette tape. The recording included tracks that were written during the same sessions as the Ear Bitten split, and was even intended to be released on the same disc, however the material was put out as its own separate release. Terse also released a C45 version of the album, which included alternative artwork and a different track listing. Music For Midgets reissued the cassette tape with the original track listing and new artwork in 1982.
1981	Clean: Released: 1981; Label: Dogfood Productions/Terse Tapes; Format: LP, CS	Released in 1981 as an LP through Dogfood Productions, a sub label operated through Terse Tapes. A cassette edition, with different art, was also released the same time. In 2005 the album was reissued on compact disc format through Sevcom.
1982	Blubberknife: Released: 1982; Label: Terse Tapes; Format: CS	First released in 1982 as a cassette, then reissued via Ink Records with different art, then reissued again as a double cassette set through Terse Tapes in 1988 titled Many A Wonderful Picnic Has Been Ruined By A Blubberknife, and then reissued one last time through Sevcom in 2005 as a double CDr set.
1983	Since the Accident: Released: 1983; Label: Ink/Virgin/Red Flame; Format: LP	Released in 1983 as a vinyl record. Nettwerk reissued the album in 1989 on CD and cassette formats, now including tracks from the Blubberknife album. Sevcom issued a CDr repress of the album in 2003, and Medical Records released the album as a black and white split coloured vinyl in 2014.
1985	City Slab Horror: Released: 1985; Label: Ink Records; Format: LP	First vinyl press was released in 1985 through Ink Records. In 1988 Nettwerk reissued the album on CD and cassette formats that included tracks from Blubberknife, much like they did with Since The Accident that same year. Sevcom released the album as a double CDr set in 2003, and Medical Records repressed the album on vinyl in 2014, all copies coloured bone white.
1986	Come Visit the Big Bigot: Released: 1986; Label: Ink/Nettwerk; Format: LP, CS	First issued in 1986 through vinyl and cassette through Ink and Nettwerk. Nettwerk released a CD version of the album in 1987 combined with their Dead Eyes Opened mini-album, titling it Come Visit the Big Bigot with Dead Eyes Opened. A CDr reissue was released in 1998 through Sevcom, and in 2012 a 25th anniversary edition of the album was released through the Sevcom bandcamp page through a variety of digital download formats.
1987	Bad Mood Guy: Released: 1987; Label: Volition/Nettwerk; Format: CD, LP, CS	Released in 1987 through Volition and Nettwerk on CD, LP, and cassette formats. Reissued as a CDr through Sevcom in 2002.
1989	Rotund for Success: Released: 1989; Label: Volition/Nettwerk; Format: CD, LP, CS	Released in 1989 through Volition and Nettwerk on CD, LP, and cassette formats. Reissued as a CDr through Sevcom in 2002. LTM released their own CD reissue of the album in 2004.
1991	Cuisine (With Piscatorial): Released: 1991; Label: Volition/Nettwerk; Format: CD, CS	Released in 1991 through Voltion and Nettwerk on CD and cassette formats. Reissued as a CDr through Sevcom in 2003. The album peaked at number 171 on the ARIA charts.
1994	Gigapus: Released: 1994; Label: Volition; Format: CD	Released on CD format through Volition in 1994. A two disc deluxe edition also exists, and a special European edition was issued in 1995. In 1996, Decibel released a version of the album that included a bonus CD-ROM. In 2001 Sevcom issued a CDr edition of the album that included the entirety of the Heart Of The Party CD single. In 2009, Sevcom issued a version of the album that included an extra disc of music, sometimes referred to as Giga++ by fans. The album peaked at number 105 on the ARIA charts.
1998	Haul Ass: Released: 1998; Label: Sevcom; Format: CDr	Released in 1998 as the band's first fully independent release since 1982's Blubberknife. All copies are home burned CDr discs, and the first 1000 copies, which included promptly green coloured artwork, included two bonus tracks ("Pie Shepherd Family" and "There's A String Inside Your Body") that the standard editions, the ones with red coloured artwork, lacked.
1998	Contoured Stimulation (Music Server Lite): Released: 1998; Label: Sevcom; Format: CDr	Part two of the four part Music Server series of albums, however it was the first of which to be released. The album was reissued in 2003 with alternative artwork. The recording in its entirety was later used as bonus content on the DVD included in the Illustrated Family Doctor soundtrack.
1999	Airconditioning Your Productivity (Music Server Lite): Released: 1999; Label: Sevcom; Format: CDr	Part three of the four part Music Server series of albums. Reissued in 2003 with alternative artwork. The recording in its entirety was later used as bonus content on the DVD included in the Illustrated Family Doctor soundtrack.
2001	Gashing and Kato: Released: 2001; Label: Sevcom; Format: CDr	Both tracks, "Gashing The Old Mae West" and "Kato Gets The Girl", where previously released as their own separate recordings, "Gashing" from the Gashing The Old Mae West 12" EP, and "Kato" from the Kato Gets The Girl home video.
2002	Cubicle Broadcasts (Music Server Lite V.1): Released: 2002; Label: Sevcom; Format: CDr	Part one of the four part Music Server series of albums. Unlike the previous two, it was never reissued. The recording in its entirety was later used as bonus content on the DVD included in the Illustrated Family Doctor soundtrack.
2002	Op: Released: 2002; Label: Sevcom; Format: CDr	First album released in the series of Op albums. Issued in a DVD case.
2003	Controlling Time: Released: 2003; Label: Sevcom; Format: CDr	The final album released in the Music Server series of albums. Initially released in 2003, the album was deleted from the Sevcom catalogue in 2004. The recording in its entirety was later used as bonus content on the DVD included in the Illustrated Family Doctor soundtrack.
2004	Op 1.2: Released: 2004; Label: Sevcom; Format: CDr	Second album released in the Op series. First issued in a special variopac-styled case. Later copies came in standard jewel cases.
2005	Op 2.0: Released: 2005; Label: Sevcom; Format: CDr	Third album released in the Op series. Issued in a DVD case much like the first Op album.
2005	Op 2.5 (Millennium Cheesecake): Released: 2005; Label: Sevcom; Format: CDr	Fourth recorded issued in the Op series. First 100 copies included bits of plastic of various shapes and sizes inside the CD jewel case.
2006	Under Gail Succubus: Released: 2006; Label: Sevcom; Format: 2xCD	Double album that came a metal box edition and a standard DVD case edition. Let it also be noted that this was the first Severed Heads album to contain new material that was not a part of any particular release series since Haul Ass from 1998.
2007	Op 3: Released: 2007; Label: Sevcom; Format: DL	The fifth consecutive release in the Op series. First released in 2007 as a free digital download from the Sevcom website. This contained the last new material the project recorded before they officially ended in 2008. A compilation of remixed versions of songs from all of the releases was released as a download album entitled Op (chOPped) in 2009, which Tom Ellard regards as the definitive version of Op.

=== Compilation albums ===
Year	Album details	Comments
1981	Media Jingles: Released: 1981; Label: Conventional Tapes; Format: C90	First released in 1981 as a C90 cassette through Conventional Tapes as a part of their Media Jingles series of releases. Music For Midgets reissued the recording in 1982 with different artwork.
1985	Clifford Darling, Please Don't Live In The Past: Released: 1985; Label: Ink Records; Format: 2xLP	First issued as a double compilation album in 1985 through Ink Records, then reissued as a double CDr set through Sevcom.
1985	Stretcher: Released: 1985; Label: Volition; Format: LP	First issued in 1985 on vinyl format through Volition, then reissued on CDr format through Sevcom.
1988	Bulkhead: Released: 1988; Label: Volition/Nettwerk; Format: LP, CD, CS	First issued on vinyl, cassette, and compact disc in 1988 through Volition and Nettwerk. Nettwerk then reissued the album on cassette and compact disc formats in 1990. Sevcom issued the recording on digital formats in 2004 under the title Bulkhead Plus (Singles 83-84).
1991	Retread: Released: 1991; Label: Volition/Nettwerk; Format: LP, CD	Would later be reissued in 2001 through Sevcom with extra material.
1994	Trance Techno: Released: 21 July 1994; Label: Cultdep; Format: CD	Japanese-only release.
1996	Severything V.1: Released: 1996; Label: Sevcom; Format: CD-ROM	CD-ROM that included digital audio files, released in 1996 through the then newly formed Sevcom label. It is also considered by some as the very first musical recording to be officially released by an artist on digital formats.
1998	Severything V.2.0.2: Released: 1998; Label: Sevcom; Format: CD-ROM	Released through the internet as a CD-ROM that included digital audio files, much like Severything V.1.
1999	Ear Bitten 79-99: Released: 1999; Label: Sevcom; Format: CDr	Compilation that included the entire Severed Heads side of the 1980 Ear Bitten/No Vowels, No Bowels split LP, plus remix tracks.
2001	Twister + Retread: Released: 1 August 2001; Label: Sevcom; Format: CDr	Sevcom CDr reissue of Retread, which includes alternative artwork and the entirety of the "Twister" single.
2006	Viva Heads!: Released: 2006; Label: LTM; Format: CD	Compilation of selected tracks recorded during live performances. Note that this is also the first Severed Heads recording to not be released through the band's Sevcom imprint since the 1994 album Gigapus.
2007	ComMerz: Released: 2007; Label: LTM; Format: 2xCD	Double disc compilation album.
2008	Adenoids 1977-1985: Released: May 2008; Label: Vinyl-On-Demand; Format: 5xLP	Five disc vinyl boxset that included early Severed Heads material recorded between 1977 and 1985. A special edition of 77 came packaged in laundry bags. In 2010, Sevcom issued a CDr version of the album spanning 4 discs total.
2015	Better Dead Than Head: Released: 18 September 2015; Label: Sevcom; Format: DL	Digital compilation album that includes remixed material Severed Heads played during their reunion shows.

=== Soundtrack albums ===
Year	Album details	Comments
2005	The Illustrated Family Doctor Soundtrack: Released: February 2005; Label: Mana Soundtracks; Format: CD+DVD	Two-disc set, with the first being the CD of the entire soundtrack used for The Illustrated Family Doctor, and the second a DVD including various videos, the first four parts of the Music Server series as DVD audio files, and MP3s of songs from Haul Ass and Op accessible from DVD-ROM drives.

=== Video albums ===
Year	Album details	Comments
1987	I've Told You Once I've Told You A 1000 Times: Released: 1987; Label: Volition/Ikon; Format: VHS	Recorded during the band's 1987 Australian tour.
1987	Kato Gets The Girl: Released: 1987; Label: Volition/Ink Records; Format: VHS	Home video release that contained live performances. The title track would later appear on the 2001 album Gashing and Kato.
1990	Overhead: Released: 1990; Label: Volition; Format: VHS	Collection of videos produced between 1986 and 1989
2003	The Robot Peepshow: Released: October 2003; Label: Sevcom; Format: DVDr	Live video performance collection
2004	Paleolithic (1982-1994): Released: 2004; Label: Sevcom; Format: DVDr	Compilation of music videos and live performances.
2005	The Robot Peepshow 2: Released: 2005; Label: Sevcom; Format: DVDr	Video clips used during live performances from 2004 to 2005
2008	Showbag: Released: 2008; Label: Sevcom; Format: 2xDVDr	Double disc set including live performances and videos
2010	Showbag HD: Released: 2010; Label: Sevcom; Format: DVDr, Blue-Rayr	HD version of Showbag. Some copies came with balloons packaged in the cases.

== Extended plays ==
Year	Album details	Comments
1986	Gashing The Mae West: Released: 1986; Label: Ink Records; Format: 12"	12" vinyl extended play, the title track would later appear on the 2001 album Gashing and Kato
2011	Haul Ass Professional: Released: 2011; Label: Sevcom; Format: DL	Contains material recording during the Haul Ass sessions, was available as a free download.
2015	Big Saints Reward EP (88-90 Dubs): Released: 18 May 2015; Label: Optimo Trax; Format: 12"	12" vinyl EP containing remixes of Severed Heads songs.

== Singles ==
Year	Single	Peak chart positions			Album
Year	Single	AUS	US Dance	UK Indie	Album
1984	"Dead Eyes Opened"	—	—	—	Since the Accident
1985	"Stretcher"	—	—	—	Non-album single
1985	"Goodbye Tonsils"	—	—	17	City Slab Horror
1985	"Petrol"	—	—	—	Non-album single
1986	"Twenty Deadly Diseases"	—	—	—	Come Visit The Big Bigot
1986	"Propeller"	—	—	—	Come Visit The Big Bigot
1987	"Hot With Fleas"	—	—	—	Bad Mood Guy
1988	"Greater Reward"	—	19	—	Rotund For Success
1989	"All Saint's Day"	—	25	—	Rotund For Success
1990	"Big Car"	—	—	—	Rotund For Success
1992	"Twister"	186	—	—	Cuisine (With Piscatorial)
1994	"Dead Eyes Opened Remix"	16	—	—	Non-album single
1995	"Heart of the Party"	115	—	—	Gigapus
2015	"Lamborghini" b/w "Petrol"	—	—	—	Non-album singles
2016	"Beautiful Arabic Surface"	—	—	—	Non-album singles
"—" denotes releases that did not chart or were not released in that territory.
