= Koalamagic =

Live album by Deerhoof
- Released: (United States) 2001
- Recorded: 1996–2000
- Label: Dual Plover

Deerhoof chronology
| Halfbird (2001) | Koalamagic (2001) | Reveille (2002) |

Koalamagic is a live album released in 2001 by Deerhoof on the Australian label Dual Plover. The album includes five tracks, some of which are several songs put together, recorded over the course of the band's early, noise-oriented years, from 1996 to 2000. The material is culled from Deerhoof's first full-length, Holdypaws, Halfbird, and Reveille. The tracks are presented in the reverse-chronological order featuring various lineups, starting with the trio that recorded Reveille. The following tracks include performances by Rob Fisk, a founding member, and other short-lived members like Kelly Goode, Jess Goddard, and Chris Cooper. Ned Raggett of AllMusic described the album as "a sort-of band history as alternate arrangements and lineups came and went".

== Track listing ==
1. gore in rut / the pickup bear / holy night fever / who nu / queen of the lake / god save the queen bee / queen orca wicca wind (2000) – 19:26
2. insist (2000) – 2:57
3. a-town test site (1999) – 1:57
4. come see the duck (1998) – 1:48
5. sophie / bendinin / t.c. - tender care / the pickup bear (1996) – 5:58

== Personnel ==
- Chris Cooper – guitar (tracks 5)
- John Dieterich – guitar (tracks 1–2)
- Rob Fisk – guitar (tracks 3–4), bass (tracks 5)
- Jess Goddard – keyboard (tracks 5)
- Kelly Goode – keyboard (tracks 3)
- Satomi Matsuzaki – vocals (tracks 1, 3–5), bass guitar (tracks 1–3), keyboard (tracks 5), bells (tracks 5)
- Greg Saunier – drums, vocals (tracks 5)
