= Vertigo (Boxcar album) =

Studio album by Boxcar
- Released: 19 November 1990
- Genres: Synth-pop, electronica
- Length: 43:28
- Label: Volition Records
- Producer: Robert Racic

Boxcar chronology
Vertigo (1990)	Revision (1992)

Singles from Vertigo
- 1. "Freemason (You Broke the Promise)" Released: 1988; 2. "Insect" Released: 1989; 3. "Gas Stop (Who Do You Think You Are)" Released: 1990; 4. "Lelore" Released: 1991

Professional ratings
Review scores
Source	Rating
AllMusic	link

Vertigo is the debut album by Australian electronic-synthpop group Boxcar released in 1990 by Volition Records in Australia (voltcd24) and by Arista Records (ARCD8610) in the United States. The single "Freemason (You Broke The Promise)" in 1988 hit number 8 in the United States Billboard dance music chart. "Insect" (remixed by noted producer Arthur Baker) and "Gas Stop (Who Do You Think You Are?)" (remixed by Francois Kevorkian) both charted in the US but had little local impact – "Gas Stop" peaked at #82 on the ARIA singles chart.

== Track listing ==
1. "Gas Stop (Who Do You Think You Are?)"
2. "Insect"
3. "Vertigo"
4. "Freemason (You Broke the Promise)"
5. "Comet"
6. "Hit & Run"
7. "900 Hours"
8. "Lelore"
9. "Cruel to You"
10. "This Is the Town"
11. "Index"

== Charts ==
Chart (1991)	Position
Australia (ARIA)	118

== Revision ==
Revision

Remix album by Boxcar
- Released: 1992
- Recorded: 1989–1992
- Genres: Synth-pop, electronica
- Label: Volition Records

Boxcar chronology
Vertigo (1990)	Revision (1992)	Algorhythm (1994)

Revision is a 1992 remix album by Australian electronic-synthpop group Boxcar released by Volition Records in Australia (voltcd46) largely featuring remixes from the group's debut Vertigo (1990), with the sole exception of a new track, "Ultrasonic".

=== Track listing ===
1. "Ultrasonic (Gyro Mix)" (remixed by Pee Wee Ferris, Sydney 1992)
2. "Comet (Vision Mix)" (remixed by Vision 4/5, Brisbane 1991)
3. "Hit & Run (Euphoric Mix)" (remixed by Sugarman & Klippel, Melbourne 1991)
4. "Insect (club mix)" (remixed by Robert Racic, Sydney 1989)
5. "900 Hours (Mr E. Mix.)" (remixed by Tom Ellard, Sydney 1992)
6. "Gas Stop (High Octane Mix)" (remixed by Francois Kevorkian, New York 1990)
7. "Freemason (Shakedown Mix)" (remixed by Arthur Baker, New York 1989
8. "Lelore (World Vibe Mix)" (remixed by Tony Garcia, Miami 1991)
9. "Hit & Run (Acid on the Rocks)" (remixed by Robert Racic, New York 1989)
10. "Vertigo (Spiral Dub)" (remixed by Robert Racic, Sydney 1989)

=== Charts ===
Chart (1992)	Position
Australia (ARIA)	154
