= Haul Ass =

Studio album by Severed Heads
- Released: September 1998
- Recorded: 1997–1998 at Terse Tapes, Australia
- Genre: IDM
- Length: 63:32
- Label: Sevcom
- Producer: Tom Ellard

Severed Heads chronology
Gigapus (1994)	Haul Ass (1998)	Gashing And Kato (2001)

Professional ratings
Review scores
Source	Rating
Sputnik Music	4.5/5 stars

Haul Ass is the eleventh studio album by Australian electronic music group Severed Heads. After Tom Ellard's relationship soured with Nettwerk and Volition Records, he decided to release Haul Ass independently through his then newly formed Sevcom imprint, making Haul Ass the first independently released Severed Heads album since 1982's Blubberknife. The album was burned on CD-R discs, while the artwork for the jewel cases were home printed with the use of a computer printer. Two editions were made, the "standard edition", which had prominently red and grey artwork, and the "special edition", which included two extra tracks not included on the standard edition. The special edition was limited to only 1000 copies. Tom Ellard has described the album as "dark". The entire album was recorded with software called Session 8, the precursor of Pro Tools.

== Track listing ==
No.	Title	Length
1.	"Choose Evil"	4:02
2.	"Two Dead Daughters"	3:30
3.	"The Interpreter"	5:27
4.	"Better Harms And Heartbreaks"	4:15
5.	"A Mouth Full Of Marbles"	3:32
6.	"Interstate"	4:12
7.	"Chikibox"	4:17
8.	"A Head Is Born"	4:27
9.	"Bookburner"	4:55
10.	"Hawaii 98"	4:19
11.	"Dreamsong"	3:19
12.	"All That Matters Is You"	5:20
13.	"Drown"	3:03
14.	"Lufthansa"	4:34
15.	"Sevs In Space"	4:20

Special Edition Bonus Tracks
No.	Title	Length
16.	"Pie, Shepherd, Family"	2:01
17.	"There's A String Inside Your Body"	4:38
Total length:		70:11

== Personnel ==
- Tom Ellard - production, vocals, music
- Stephen Jones - live performances
- Alison Cole - live performances
- Paul Mac - live performances
- Ben Suthers - live performances
