= Jaimie Leonarder =

Jaimie Leonarder (born 1958, Sydney) also known as Jay Katz is an Australian musician, archivist, social worker, film critic, radio announcer, and DJ.

== Biography ==
Born and raised in Sydney, Leonarder attended Artarmon Public School and Crows Nest Boys High School. He is the second of four children. His younger sister, Jennine Leonarder-Collins, was Australia's representative in the 1987 Miss Universe Competition.

Leonarder trained as a nurse studying both general and psychiatric nursing and has worked in welfare, as a youth worker, a diversional therapist, and managing the Hurstville C.Y.S.S. centre.

Leonarder formed an experimental noise rock band, Mu Mesons (1982–1999), and he still works as a DJ and occasionally puts on "The Sounds of Seduction" night club.

In 1982, Leonarder was also a founding member of The Loop Orchestra, a reel-to-reel tape machine band with fellow artists John Blades, Ron Brown and ex-Severed Heads member, Richard Fielding.

In 1998, he presented a selection of Scopitone films at Bondi's Flickerfest international short film festival. In the same year he appeared on the SBS television program Alchemy with his wife Aspidisia, aka. "Miss Death", showing off his Scopitone jukebox machines.

He was the subject of the 2002 documentary film Love & Anarchy: The Wild Wild World of Jaimie Leonarder.

With Fenella Kernebone and Megan Spencer in 2005 and 2006, Leonarder co-hosted The Movie Show, a film criticism show broadcast on SBS television.

He hosted The Naked City (a radio show on FBi Radio in Sydney) along with his wife and Coffin Ed until 2010.

He hosts the weekly Cult Sinema night at the Annandale Hotel in Sydney and shows films and documentaries at his private cinema, the Mu-Meson Archives.

By the end of the 2020s, Leonarder has evolved to become vice president of UFO Research (NSW).
