= Andrew Penhallow =

Australian record label founder (1952–2023)

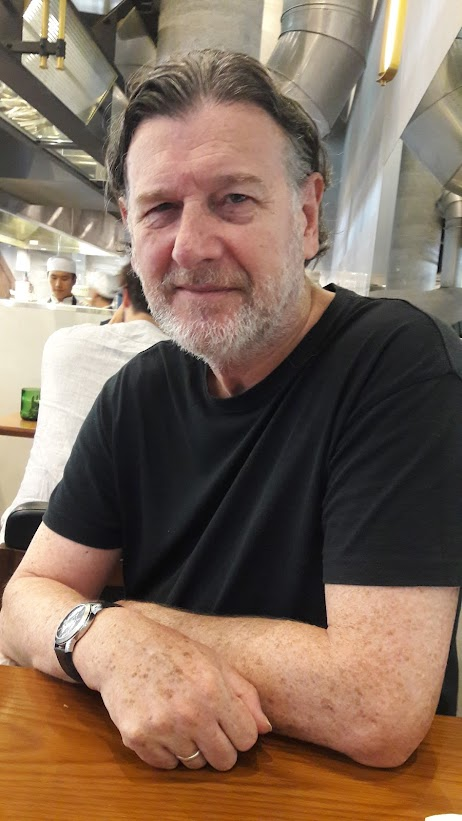
- Andrew Penhallow in 2021
- Born: 24 January 1952; London, England
- Died: 17 May 2023 (aged 71); Sydney, Australia

Andrew Penhallow (1952–2023) was an Australian music figure who founded electronic music record label Volition Records and co-founded the Boiler Room at the Big Day Out music festival.

== Early career ==
After moving to Australia from England in the 1970s, Andrew Penhallow worked as a contributor for Rolling Stone Australia and as manager of the local band Pel Mel.

In 1979 he co-founded GAP Records with Rolling Stone Australia publisher Paul Gardiner. They released Pel Mel's debut album and licensed releases from English labels Factory Records and Rough Trade, including releasing Joy Division's albums in Australia for the first time in 1980.

After GAP closed, Penhallow set up Volition Records in 1984, signing local group Severed Heads and licensing UK group New Order from Factory Records.

Penhallow was also managing director of Factory Australasia, a local subsidiary of Factory Records, between 1984 and 1992. The label's first release was New Order's Low-Life album, released when the band toured Australia in 1985. In 1988, Factory Australasia released New Order's 'Blue Monday 1988' which reached number three in the charts, even with a lack of radio airplay. Penhallow criticised commercial radio stations such as Triple M at the time for not playing dance music, with the success of 'Blue Monday 1988' attributed to dance clubs and music videos seen on TV.

In 1994, Penhallow teamed with Ken West to bring dance music to his Big Day Out music festival. Penhallow had previously brought his Volition acts Severed Heads and Itch-E and Scratch-E to 1993's festival, and after noticing their success, in 1994 West and Penhallow created The Boiler Room, a separate area of the festival dedicated to dance music. Volition acts such as Boxcar and Vision Four 5 appeared at the first Boiler Room, and the festival addition was credited with increasing the popularity of dance music in Australia.

Penhallow was behind the ARIA Award for Best Dance Release being introduced to the annual ARIA Music Awards in 1995, with Volition acts winning the first two years.

He also founded Second Nature in New Zealand, as a sublabel to Volition, to release local dance and hip hop music from Australia and New Zealand and provide better representation of local music produced in the genres.

== Later years ==
After Volition's publishing deal with Sony Music expired in 1996, Andrew Penhallow took a year off before returning to the music industry with a publishing company Higher Songs.

He managed Love Tattoo as part of his artist management company 2000AV, and from 1999 worked as local dance A&R consultant for Warner Music Australia. He continued supporting Australian dance music, through work with Australia's first internet radio station Pulse Radio, compiling compilation CDs to promote local artists, and in 2005 founded Resolution Music.

Penhallow died in 2023, with many artists from Australia thanking him for his strong support towards electronic music over his career.

== Awards and nominations ==
=== Australian Dance Music Awards ===
The Australian Dance Music Awards (DMA) were founded by 3D World in 2000 to celebrate dance music in Australia and recognise the people who helped it gain greater recognition nationally.

Year	Award	Result
2000	Outstanding Contribution To Dance Music	Nominated
