= John Blades =

- Born: John Thomas Blades; 8 December 1959
- Origin: Sydney, Australia
- Died: 25 November 2011 (aged 51) Greenwich, New South Wales, Australia
- Genres: Experimental Music, Tape Loop
- Occupations: Musician, radio presenter, civil engineer
- Instrument: Reel-to-reel Tape Machine
- Years active: 1980–2011
- Website: thelooporchestra.com at the Wayback Machine (archived 5 March 2009)

John Thomas Blades (8 December 1959 – 25 November 2011) was an Australian experimental music artist and member of The Loop Orchestra; he also worked as a radio broadcaster and documentary maker, and as a civil engineer. In 1982 he was diagnosed with multiple sclerosis and used a wheelchair from 1993. In 2010, his radio documentary, The Too Hard Basket, won the Walkley Award for 'Social Equity Journalism – All Media', and the 'Radio Documentary of the Year Award' from the Asia-Pacific Broadcasting Union. Blades died on 25 November 2011 after complications from cancer therapy.

== Biography ==
=== Experimental music bands ===
John Thomas Blades was born in December 1959 as the son of Douglas and Pam Blades with a brother Bruce. He grew up in Sydney and from the mid-1970s he listened to local radio, Double Jay, "[It] was like the breath of fresh air that people like me needed who had been swamped by disco, American soft rock ... rock opuses ... and the English Glam rock". In 1977 Blades and a group of school friends provided their favourite music for a radio presentation on Double Jay. His early preferences were for punk music by Ramones and The Saints, innovative music of Frank Zappa and the Mothers of Invention and reggae. By 1978 he preferred Peter Doyle programme which featured post-punk and experimental music, "[which] incorporated the punk ideal with new elements such as electronic noise and rhythms, spoken word, dub, electronically processed voice and experimental acoustic and electronic sound".

In 1980 while studying civil engineering at University of Sydney, Blades was a founding member of electronic music group The East End Butchers with Doyle. In 1982 he was a founding member of The Loop Quartet, with Richard Fielding (ex-Severed Heads), Ron Brown and Jaimie Leonarder. During that year, the quartet performed a radio studio live to air experimental performance using loops on reel-to-reel tape machines. Blades also formed and performed in other groups: War Meat and the Dictator, and Men Like Licorice, both in 1982. That year, Blades also started working as a structural engineer for the Department of Main Roads: he specialised in bridge engineering. He was diagnosed with multiple sclerosis (MS) – his mother Pam also had the disorder – and he was hopeful of retaining mobility.

In 1982 The Loop Orchestra was formed by Blades, Fielding and Anthony Maher; and in 1983, Doyle joined. In 1990, the band's first release, Suspense, was launched at the AFI Cinema, Sydney. Annette Shun Wah from SBS TV's The Noise programme interviewed the band and Blades described their work,

for the piece, Suspense, the sound sources were all concrete, that is, all pre-existing sounds, and it was a study of the way sounds and music is constructed for suspense in horror movies. So it's all taken from scores for those films – generally untreated sections of the scores from those films, from the 1940s, through to films like Creature from the Black Lagoon of the 1950s, right through to Texas Chain Saw Massacre in the 1970s and Evil Dead in the 1980s, and so they're fragments of sound. It's like deconstructing an existing sound source and reconstructing – or structuring – something else out of that deconstruction.

By 1993 Blades' MS had progressed and he could no longer walk but he continued with his work at the Roads & Traffic Authority, with The Loop Orchestra and on radio. In 2007, Australian violinist, Jon Rose, spoke at the 9th Annual Peggy Glanville-Hicks Address (see Peggy Glanville-Hicks), Rose discussed Blades' enthusiasm and commitment to the Sydney music community:

Multiple sclerosis sentenced John Blades to a wheelchair, where no doubt it was expected that he would spiral slowly out of view. The contrary happened and with committed zeal, he has become a major figure in the Sydney alternative music scene, organising & conducting his Loop Orchestra, promoting & supporting new music and outsider art. Not only have his activities kept his mental state together, he tells me that his condition has actually been reversed through his involvement with music. Physical healing with music is not just the province of new agers – music can be as practical as taking aspirin.

=== Radio ===
During 1981 John Blades was invited by Ian Hartley to appear on the 2MBS' radio programme, Disc Noir, to present samples of his music collection. Hartley asked Blades to host his own show, Hot Dog You Bet, which was broadcast by 2MBS (102.5 MHz) from 1982 to 1985. Fielding had suggested the name of the show, inspired by "a flexi disc released with a New York art magazine called Smegma, an audio collage".

In March 1998, due to the severity of his MS which reduced his mobility, Blades finished working at the RTA. His most pleasing work as an engineer was on the Glebe Island Bridge: "I designed water drainage system from the bridge deck to the underground stormwater system". From 1998 Blades presented a fortnightly radio programme, Background Noise, with initial co-host Fielding, and from 2003, another ex-Severed Heads musician, Garry Bradbury on 2MBS. The programme featured "mainly experimental music with innovative film soundtracks, radio plays and spoken word". During his time at 2MBS FM, Blades also founded the Contemporary Music Collective (CMC), a group of radio broadcasters and producers who supported noise and experimental music programmes after midnight, which differs from the station's usual programming of classical music during daytime. Other programmes include Eclectic Chair, The Dust Museum and Our World Through Seratonin. In 2004 CMC organised a fund-raiser in 2004 called Dis-Co-LLaboration to celebrate 22 years on-air – Severed Heads played live, along with radio presenters and CMC members.

In 2010, Blades' documentary, "The Too Hard Basket", was broadcast on Radio National, 360 Documentaries programme. It won the Walkley Award for 'Social Equity Journalism – All Media', and the 'Radio Documentary of the Year Award' from the Asia-Pacific Broadcasting Union. Blades died on 25 November 2011 after complications from cancer therapy.
