= Cuisine (With Piscatorial) =

Studio album by Severed Heads
- Released: 1991
- Recorded: 1988–1991
- Genres: EDM; synth-pop
- Length: 42:52
- Labels: Nettwerk; Volition Records
- Producers: Tom Ellard; Stephen Jones

Severed Heads chronology
Rotund for Success (1989)	Cuisine (With Piscatorial) (1991)	Gigapus (1994)

Singles from Cuisine (With Piscatorial)
- 1. "Twister" Released: 1992

Professional ratings
Review scores
Source	Rating
AllMusic	2/5 stars
Brainwashed	Positive
Rolling Stone	3.5/5 stars

Cuisine (With Piscatorial) is the ninth studio album released by Australian electronic music group Severed Heads, issued in 1991. The album's lead single, "Twister", was released a year later.

== Background ==
The compact disc edition of the album includes five extra tracks that the cassette edition lacked. Grouped as Piscatorial on the CD packaging, these five songs were recorded between 1988 and 1989 at a studio called dB Productions. The rest of the album (Cuisine, the first 13 tracks) was recorded between 1989 and 1991 at Terse Tapes in Sydney, Australia, except "Twister", which was recorded live in Riverdale, California.

== Track listing ==
All tracks are written by Tom Ellard.

Side One
No.	Title	Length
1.	"Pilot in Hell"	3:14
2.	"Seven of Oceans"	3:16
3.	"Finder"	2:46
4.	"Estrogen"	4:34
5.	"King of the Sea"	2:53
6.	"Host of Quadrille"	2:42
7.	"Life in the Whale"	3:38

Side Two
No.	Title	Length
8.	"Twister"	3:27
9.	"Ugly Twenties"	3:21
10.	"Piggy Smack"	2:47
11.	"Golden Height/I'm Your Antidote"	3:44
12.	"The Tingler (They Shine Within)"	3:13
13.	"Goodbye"	3:17

CD Edition Bonus Tracks (Piscatorial)
No.	Title	Length
14.	"Her Teeth the Ally"	4:49
15.	"Skippy Roo Kangaroo"	4:14
16.	"Ottoman"	3:59
17.	"Quest for Oom Pa Pa"	6:07
18.	"Wonder of All the World"	5:27
Total length:		67:31

2003 Sevcom CD-R/Bandcamp reissue
No.	Title	Length
1.	"Cry"	3:02
2.	"Twister"	3:28
3.	"Pilot in Hell"	3:16
4.	"King of the Sea"	2:55
5.	"Rainy Valley"	2:32
6.	"Care is Dead"	2:49
7.	"Host of Quadrille"	2:44
8.	"Goodbye"	3:20
9.	"Ugly Twenties"	3:16
10.	"Piggy Smack"	2:49
11.	"Golden Height/I'm Your Antidote"	3:45
12.	"The Tingler (They Shine Within)"	3:15
13.	"Estrogen (Demo)"	2:53
14.	"Life in the Whale"	3:40
15.	"Hemet"	0:54
16.	"Her Teeth the Ally"	4:50
17.	"Skippy Roo Kangaroo"	4:15
18.	"Ottoman"	3:58
19.	"Quest for Oom Pa Pa Part 1"	6:06
20.	"Quest for Oom Pa Pa Part 2"	2:07
21.	"Quest for Oom Pa Pa Part 3"	5:22
22.	"Wonder of All the World"	5:25
Total length:		76:41

- 1, 5, 6 and 15 were originally released in 1993 by Ellard's side band Co Kla Coma (with Lucy CyberVuva and Karen Eliot), appearing under the pseudonym Fußßßball, as part of a German split CD with the band Juniper Hill entitled Können Tiere Denken/Jedermann Sein Eigner Fußball.
- 13, 20 and 21 are exclusive to this reissue.
- "Seven of Oceans," "Finder," and the final version of "Estrogen" have been removed.

== Personnel ==
- Tom Ellard – vocals, synthesizers, production, artwork
- Stephen Jones – video synthesizers, production
- Robert Racic – editing
- Woolford Higgins – design, artwork
- Jason G – artwork
- Andrew Dunstall – artwork

== Charts ==
Chart (1991)	Peak position
Australian Albums (ARIA)	171

== Release history ==
Region	Date	Label	Format	Catalog	Release Notes
Australia	1991	Volition Records	CD	VOLTCD040	First CD pressing, includes tracks not included on the cassette edition. Released with the title Cuisine (With Piscatorial).
Europe	1991	Nettwerk	CD	W2-30062	First CD pressing, includes tracks not included on the cassette edition. Released with the title Cuisine (With Piscatorial).
North America	1991	Nettwerk	CD	W2-30062	First CD pressing, includes tracks not included on the cassette edition. Released with the title Cuisine (With Piscatorial).
North America	1991	Nettwerk	CS	W4-30062	Cassette edition, released under the title Cuisine.
Australia	2003	Sevcom	CD-R	N/A	Sevcom reissue, includes completely new track listing, also includes material Ellard previously recorded under the alias of Fußßßball.
