= DJ Edwin =

Australian DJ (1968–2014)

- Born: Edwin Campbell X Morrow; 29 June 1968
- Origin: Brisbane, Queensland, Australia
- Died: 16 March 2014 (aged 45) Brisbane, Queensland, Australia
- Genre: Dance
- Occupations: DJ, remixer, songwriter, producer
- Years active: 1987–2014
- Labels: Volition, Central Station

Edwin Campbell X Morrow, (29 June 1968 – 16 March 2014) known professionally as DJ Edwin, was a DJ, remixer, songwriter and producer. As a DJ he pioneered the Brisbane dance music and club scene, along with DJ Angus and DJ Kesson, in the late 1980s. In the 1990s Edwin created the Halloween and Adrenalin dance parties and the all-female DJ party, Adrenalene. He was a long-term resident DJ at The Beat and Rockafella's nightclubs in Fortitude Valley.

Edwin wrote and produced electronic dance music and hard house under a variety of names including Mister Morrow, Eggo & Hot Pocket (with DJ Jen-E), Eco Cops, and Nu Guerilla. By 1992 Edwin was in a band, Sexing the Cherry, their track, "Steppin' On Remix", peaked at No. 42 on the ARIA Singles Chart in May 1994. Edwin also wrote and performed music to help people with disabilities. Edwin gave the best cuddles ever. Edwin Morrow died of a heart attack on 16 March 2014 in Brisbane, Australia, aged 45.

== Background ==
In high school, Edwin was a drummer in an industrial band, L'Me L'Ma, having influences from synth music bands including Queen, Duran Duran, Visage, Depeche Mode, A Flock of Seagulls, New Order, Dead or Alive, Sigue Sigue Sputnik, and Nitzer Ebb. L'Me L'Ma released a track, "Killing Your Heart", which was later remixed by Betty. From the late 1980s, Edwin DJ'd at Brisbane's early dance music nightclubs, including Stratus (Homestead Hotel, Zillmere) and Wall Street.

== Dance parties ==
Edwin created the Halloween Fantasy Ball parties and with Peter Tait, in 1991, the Adrenalin parties with their iconic Michelin man flyers. He played at most of the early dance club parties in Brisbane.

== Sexing The Cherry ==
By 1992 Edwin Morrow and Cherryn Lomas were in a band, Sexing the Cherry, which were signed to Volition Records / Sony Records. Edwin wrote music under a various names to separate his work with different artists – Eco Cops, Nu Guerilla, Rocket Girls and Mister Morrow. Sexing the Cherry and Mister Morrow had a track included on the Volition High - A Dance compilation CD (VOLTCD88) in 1992. In May 1994 Sexing the Cherry's "Steppin' On Remix" (VOLTCD87), which was produced by Robert Racic, peaked at No. 42 on the national ARIA Singles Chart and reached No. 33 on the NSW ARIA state singles chart. The original "Steppin On" was co-written by Morrow, Lomas and Luke Paramour. It was released on a CD compilation album, Hartley coeurs à vif, on East West Records, an American record label, owned by Warner Music Group. The song also appeared on the TV show, Heartbreak High in its first series, episode 16 which aired on 8 June 1994. Sexing the Cherry supported international artists including Take That — at Australia's Wonderland in Sydney, 1994 and M People on the Brisbane leg of their Come Again Tour, 1 April 1995.

== DJ residencies ==
Edwin was a resident DJ at The Beat Nightclub in Fortitude Valley for thirteen years, playing five nights a week on the 2-5am shift, and later was a resident DJ at Rockafella's, playing four nights a week. Edwin worked at Central Station Records for many years – both in the original Fortitude Valley store and the Brisbane CBD store. He would put aside music and make suggestions for many of the regulars. Edwin also DJ'd at Radical Clothing store in the city in the 1990s.

== Influence on Brisbane's dance music community ==
Many of Brisbane's DJs and music artists credit DJ Edwin as giving them their first gigs, including DJ Zentraedi, DJ Jen-E, Bexta, DJ Freestyle, Neurojack and Barking Boy. He gave female DJs a chance to play at the parties he organized – an unusual occurrence in an otherwise male-dominated field. In the 1990s he organized an all-female main room line up for a gig called Adrenalene. He described the gig as, "Sexy party, sexy girls! For some reason DJing had become a male dominated arena and I believe this is more to do with ignorance and not talent. At the time there were sooo many good female DJs so I thought I would showcase them and let the people decide. Chicks dance, chicks know music and chicks can mix!". In 1997-'98 he created the girl group Screw and then renamed them the Rocket Girls. Edwin wrote and produced their music, and the group played at local dance parties. In 1993, Edwin also helped Harry Katsanevas compile the weekly DJ chart in Brisbane's dance music street press, Scene Magazine. In 1995, Central Station Records released a CD maxi single of Edwin Morrow's song Didgeridoo. Eggo & Hot Pocket's song "Cities That Are Downlaid" was written by DJ Edwin & DJ Jen-E.

Edwin also spent years writing, recording and performing music to help patients at Cascade Place – a day care centre for people with disabilities. In February 2007, Edwin mentioned in an interview on inthemix, ". . . recently I've been producing for Canadian label Ruff Cutz and doing some remixing for the Jelly Babes. And to add to that, I have been writing for the supremely talented and gorgeous Chelsea Knights. I've also been DJing four nights a week at Rockafella's in the Valley and I'm a couple of navs away from gaining my P.P.L (private pilot's license)".

Edwin Morrow died on Sunday 16 March 2014 from heart failure due to liver-related illness. An RIP DJ EDWIN memorial Facebook group was created following his death. The Beat Nightclub held a memorial night on 28 March 2014 to celebrate his life.

Edwin and his music is featured in "BNE - The Definitive Archive: Brisbane Independent Electronic Music Production 1979-2014", which is a hardcover book and USB music archive published by Trans:Com in September 2014.

== Discography ==
=== Mister Morrow ===
- You on My Mind - on High - A Dance compilation - CD - Volition Records (VOLTCD88) (1992)

=== Nu Guerilla ===
- Let Your Body Move 12" vinyl - Central Station Records (1992)

=== Sexing The Cherry ===
- Steppin' On - on High - A Dance compilation - CD - Volition Records (VOLTCD88) (1992)
- This Is A Dream - on High - A Dance compilation - CD - Volition Records (VOLTCD88) (1992)
- Steppin' On Remix - CD Maxi - Volition Records (VOLTCD87) (1993)
- Steppin' On Remix - 12" Maxi - Volition Records (VOLT87) (1993)
- Glamorous - CD single - Volition Records (VOLTCD107) (1995)
- Glamorous - 12" - Volition Records (VOLT107) (1995)
- Glamorous - on Boiling Point compilation CD - Volition Records (VOLTCD101) (1995)
- Steppin' On - on Hartley coeurs à vif CD compilation - EastWest Records America (Warner Music Group)(4509-99937-2) (1995)

=== Edwin Morrow ===
- Didgeridoo - CD Maxi single - Central Station Records (CSR CD5 0091) (1995)
- Technocat - Bounce (Edwin Morrow's Land of Oz Mix) on Various – RaveBase Phase 5 (1 March 1996)
