= Dead Eyes Opened =

Single by Severed Heads

from the album Since the Accident
- B-side: "Bullet"; "Mount"
- Released: February 1984 (US); 11 June 1984 (Australia); 17 October 1994 (remixed version)
- Recorded: 1982
- Genre: EBM, industrial
- Length: 3:22 (Album version); 6:35 (Single version)
- Label: Ink Records
- Songwriter: Tom Ellard
- Producer: Tom Ellard

Severed Heads singles chronology
"Dead Eyes Opened" (1984)	"Stretcher" (1985)

"Dead Eyes Opened" is a song by the experimental Australian group Severed Heads, originally released on their 1983 album Since the Accident. Upon its initial release as a 12-inch record single in 1984, the track received critical success. A remixed version released in October 1994 achieved commercial success in Australia, peaking at #16 on the ARIA Charts.

In 2015, the song was listed at number 16 in In the Mix's '100 Greatest Australian Dance Tracks of All Time'.

== Background ==
Initially, Since the Accident was a cassette tape recorded between 1982 and 1983, and "Dead Eyes Opened" was only left on said tape to help fill up the blank space. The song includes a spoken word sample, which was credited by Tom Ellard in 2006 to be Edgar Lustgarten in the television series Scales of Justice. Lustgarten is the narrator, but the sample is from the episode Death on the Crumbles from the 1971 BBC radio series Accused in the Box. The show was based on the 1924 murder of Emily Kaye.

== Release and reception ==
Professional ratings
Review scores
Source	Rating
Allmusic	4.5/5 stars
Pop Matters	7/10 stars

The track was released as a 12-inch vinyl single in early 1984 to help promote Since the Accident, to which it received favorable reviews from critics. Sounds magazine critic Dave Henderson described the track as "gutsy, emotional, and melodic sound" and, along with nine other singles released that same week, gave the track "Single of the Week" status. AllMusic critic Sean Carruthers gave the single 4 and a half stars out of a possible five, stating that it's "...a great introduction for the band for North American audiences". Tom Ellard, frontman of Severed Heads, has expressed his distaste for the track many times throughout the years, even calling it "insipid" in one interview; and introducing the track during one live performance by stating "Here's a song we've all come to hate over the years." The single received a commercial release in Australia in June 1984.

Since its initial release in 1984, the single has been reissued a few times, each "version" includes a completely new track listing from the original. Nettwerk reissued the single as a 12-inch extended play in 1986, complete with new tracks, in order to help promote the then-newly released Come Visit The Big Bigot. Similarly, Volition Records, in partnership with Sony Music, released another version of the single in 1994, now set with new remixes of the track, to help promote Gigapus. The entire 1986 Nettwerk single was also included on the compact disc version of Come Visit The Big Bigot, which was titled as Come Visit The Big Bigot With Dead Eyes Opened, while the entire 1994 Volition single was included as a bonus second disc on some versions of Gigapus.

== Track listing ==
=== Original Ink Records 1984 12" ===
Side One
No.	Title	Length
1.	"Dead Eyes Opened"	6:35

Side Two
No.	Title	Length
2.	"Bullet"	2:45
3.	"Mount"	2:15

=== Nettwerk 1986 12" ===
Side One
No.	Title	Length
1.	"Dead Eyes Opened (Remix Three)"	6:05
2.	"Petrol"	5:42

Side Two
No.	Title	Length
3.	"We Have Come To Bless This House (Remix Two)"	3:55
4.	"Oscar's Grind"	3:48
5.	"Mambo Fist Miasma"	5:10

=== Volition Records 1994 CD ===
No.	Title	Length
1.	"Dead Eyes Opened (Radio Edit)"	3:51
2.	"Dead Eyes Opened (Re-Opened)"	9:31
3.	"Dead Eyes Opened (The Love Experiment)"	3:20
4.	"Dead Eyes Opened (Spooked)"	9:05
5.	"Dead Eyes Opened (Original)"	9:30

== Chart history ==
Chart (1995)	Peak position
Australia (ARIA)	16
