= 80's Cheesecake =

Studio album by Tom Ellard
- Released: 1982
- Recorded: 1981–82, Terse Tapes, Australia
- Genre: Experimental
- Length: 50:54
- Label: Terse Tapes
- Producer: Tom Ellard

Tom Ellard chronology
Snappy Carrion (1982)	80's Cheesecake (1982)	Meteosat 2004 (2014)

80's Cheesecake is a solo album produced and written by Tom Ellard of Severed Heads. It was released in 1982 as a C60 cassette tape through his own Terse Tapes label. According to Ellard, the album, along with his previous one, Snappy Carrion (1982), were recorded out of interest in making pop music. It is a precursor of Severed Heads' shift in sound, from their early industrialised sound to the more accessible electronic styles of their later recordings. Tracks from this cassette appeared on the Severed Heads' compilation album Clifford Darling, Please Don't Live in the Past (1985).

== Reception ==
Professional ratings
Review scores
Source	Rating
Juno Download	Positive
Resident Adviser	4/5 stars

== Track listing ==
All tracks are written by Tom Ellard, except for "Touch", co-written by Garry Bradbury

Side One
No.	Title	Length
1.	"Glass"	5:40
2.	"Saturday"	2:52
3.	"Man Dat Hip"	1:32
4.	"Epilepsy II"	5:38
5.	"Sixteen"	12:35

Side Two
No.	Title	Length
1.	"The Louis Armstrong Story – Born a Horn"	3:43
2.	"The Louis Armstrong Story – Hits Big Time 3 1/2"	1:27
3.	"The Louis Armstrong Story – Slave of Speed"	2:09
4.	"The Louis Armstrong Story – Kalama Zoo Zoo Zoo"	2:09
5.	"The Louis Armstrong Story – Mom's Grave"	1:17
6.	"The Louis Armstrong Story – 1st Love (It Was Madness)"	2:27
7.	"The Louis Armstrong Story – Smeared in Smashed Ascent"	9:25

2002 Sevcom CDr Version
No.	Title	Length
1.	"Anthem 82"	4:24
2.	"Bullet"	2:44
3.	"Mount"	2:15
4.	"Eats"	2:41
5.	"Word"	3:15
6.	"Cross"	3:23
7.	"Blame"	3:11
8.	"Hold"	1:53
9.	"Our Work for Love at Home"	5:21
10.	"Power Circles in Paris"	3:09
11.	"These Are the Words"	5:58
12.	"Touch"	2:57
13.	"Brain"	5:44
14.	"Hair"	6:00
15.	"The Louis Armstrong Story"	13:31
Total length:		66:26

2014 Dark Entries LP Version
No.	Title	Length
1.	"Anthem 82"	4:24
2.	"303b The East is Red"	3:17
3.	"Big Eats"	2:40
4.	"The Ritualistic"	2:16
5.	"Babies"	2:56
6.	"These are the Words"	4:16
7.	"Word"	3:16
8.	"Touch"	2:56
9.	"Cross"	3:00
10.	"Hold"	1:50
11.	"Our Work for Love at Home"	5:21
12.	"In Her Hair"	3:54
Total length:		40:06

2015 Bandcamp bonus tracks
No.	Title	Length
13.	"Kai Kai"	2:35
14.	"Brain"	5:44
15.	"The Louis Armstrong Story"	13:31
Total length:		61:56

4, 5 and 13 are new songs made of salvaged and backed-up parts from recordings from this period.

== Release history ==
Region	Date	Label	Format	Catalog	Release Notes
Australia	1982	Terse Tapes	C60	TRS017	Initial release.
Australia	2002	Sevcom	CD-R	N/A	First reissue, complete with new artwork and a new track listing that includes previously unreleased material.
United States	2014	Dark Entries	LP	DE-076	First ever pressing on vinyl. Includes another new track listing and remastering.
United States	2015	Bandcamp	Downloads	N/A	Expanded version of the 2014 Dark Entries LP.
