= Garry Bradbury =

Australian electronic musician (1960–2022)

- Born: 1960; England
- Died: January 2022 (aged 61–62)
- Occupation: Electronic musician
- Instruments: Tape, electronics
- Years active: 1979–2022
- Labels: Terse Tapes; Dogfood Prod Systems; Ink Records; Virgin Records; Zonar records Dual Plover
- Formerly of: Severed Heads

Garry Bradbury (1960 – January 2022) was an English-born Australian electronic musician active in Sydney's experimental music scene from 1979 to 2022.

== Career ==
His first significant collaboration was in 1980, along with brothers Simon and Tim Knuckey as the Wet Taxis, a band specializing in heavily treated guitar and drum machine and various tape manipulations.

In 1981, Bradbury teamed up with two other musicians, Tokyo Rose and Montgomery Smythe, to form Hiroshima Chair, another electronic outfit featuring a vast arsenal of analogue synthesizers. In 1981, they released half a split album "Reset", with Texan band Culturcide. They also released a live C60 cassette through Terse Tapes.

Bradbury was a member of pioneering experimental electronic band Severed Heads alongside Tom Ellard from October 1981 to 1985. This collaboration continued sporadically from 1981 to 1985. This resulted in several albums/EPs on vinyl and cassette, most notably Blubberknife (1982), Since the Accident (1983), City Slab Horror (1985), Goodbye Tonsils (1985) and the retrospective compilation Clifford Darling, Please Don't Live in the Past (1986). Bradbury also directed and designed, with assistance and collaborative input from numerous others, several of the early infamous Severed Heads' independently produced videos: Goodbye Tonsils, Canine, and Big Car.

He has also experimented with customized pianola scrolls.

In 1988, he completed his first solo album, Drug Induced Sex Rituals. Its release was planned, abandoned, delayed repeatedly, for several years, until it saw an eventual CD-R release through Sevcom in the 1990s.

In 1997, a CD entitled Actual Size, the bulk of which consisted of Bradbury's solo material, was issued first as a double CD-R through Sevcom and then as a single CD through Zonar Recordings. Much of this material resurfaced on the later compilation PANSPERMIA.

Throughout the early 2000s Bradbury was commissioned by the Sydney Theatre Company on scores for King Lear, The Tempest, and Macbeth.

In the 2000s, he released two CDs, Ruffini Corpuscle in 2003 and Instant Oblivion in 2005, on the Dual Plover label.

Bradbury's 2015 compilation, Panspermia, consisting of 2 LPs and a bonus one-sided 7", is an assemblage of remastered and re-edited works recorded sporadically over a period of around 20 years from 1986 to 2005, through the German-based label Vinyl On Demand. Following this Panspermia Plus (a slightly more comprehensive version) was made publicly available as a free download thru the online download service Bandcamp.

In 2016, a CD of new and reworked archival material was released under the title Yakovlevian Torque, made available as CD and/or download through No.Ware releases operating somewhere between Berlin and San Diego. Several of Bradbury's works also appear on the recent No-wares compilation No. No.II. (2016). A series of live performances throughout 2017 and 2018 revealed an intense, elaborately textural, less beat driven body of work which was to culminate in new releases in late 2019. Bradbury died in January 2022.

== Discography ==
=== Hiroshima Chair ===
- Reset split LP with Culturcide – Dogfood Production System (1981)

=== Size ===
- Actual Size – Zonar Recordings (1997)

=== Solo ===
- Drug Induced Sex Rituals (1988)
- Ruffini Corpuscle – Dual Plover (2003)
- "Corpuscle Plus" – Sevcom Cdr or bonus download
- Instant Oblivion – Dual Plover (2005)
- appears on "WiredLAB Open Day 2009" – Taiga Records 2011
- Panspermia (Compilation 1986–2005) 2 lp + 7" Vinyl On Demand 2015
- Panspermia Plus
- Yakovlevian Torque
- No. No II
