= Rotund for Success =

Studio album by Severed Heads
- Released: 1989
- Recorded: 1988
- Genres: EDM, synth-pop
- Length: 49:54
- Labels: Nettwerk; Volition
- Producers: Tom Ellard, Robert Racic

Severed Heads chronology
Bad Mood Guy (1987)	Rotund for Success (1989)	Cuisine (With Piscatorial) (1991)

Singles from Rotund for Success
- 1. "Greater Reward" Released: 1988; 2. "All Saints Day" Released: 1989; 3. "Big Car" Released: 1990

Professional ratings
Review scores
Source	Rating
AllMusic	2/5 stars

Rotund for Success is a studio album by the Australian electronic music group Severed Heads, released in 1989. Three singles were released from the album: "Greater Reward", "All Saints Day" and "Big Car", the first two reaching the top 30 on Billboard's Dance Club Songs chart. Much like the rest of the band's discography, the album has been issued many times in several formats through a variety of labels.

== Critical reception ==
Trouser Press wrote that "[Tom] Ellard’s lyrical sensibility is typically off-kilter and flashes of a twisted mind do erupt now and again in the mix, but the diminution of musical disturbance and the elimination of the band’s creative challenge is most disturbing." Option wrote that "each song has a catchy simple melody defined by a 'cheap & nasty synthesizer with knobs.'"

== Track listing ==
All tracks are written by Tom Ellard.

Side One
No.	Title	Length
1.	"All Saints Day"	5:23
2.	"Triangle Tangle Tango"	4:07
3.	"Bad Times Too"	4:00
4.	"Midget Sings"	3:17
5.	"Seven Miles"	3:51
6.	"Greater Reward"	4:15

Side Two
No.	Title	Length
1.	"Big Car Intro"	2:29
2.	"Big Car"	6:56
3.	"First Steps"	4:07
4.	"Rotund for Success"	3:24
5.	"L.F.M."	4:57
6.	"Chasing Skirt"	3:18

CD edition bonus tracks
No.	Title	Length
13.	"All Saints Day (Original Mix)"	4:24
14.	"Bad Times Three"	5:25
Total length:		59:43

2002 Sevcom CD-R bonus tracks
No.	Title	Length
15.	"Star Spangled Bradbury (Prank Caller Bratbury)"	4:35
16.	"Bombs Fell (Mindless Delta Scratch)"	3:21
17.	"Lovesick Fascist Meatloaf"	4:49
18.	"Rich Baby (Balloon Folding Soundtrack)"	6:08
Total length:		78:36

2004 LTM CD bonus tracks
No.	Title	Length
15.	"Star Spangled Bradbury"	4:35
16.	"Bombs Fell"	3:21
17.	"L.F.M (Part Two)"	4:49
Total length:		72:28

2021 Medical Records 2LP reissue

Side One
No.	Title	Length
1.	"All Saints Day"	5:25
2.	"Triangle Tango Tango"	4:07
3.	"Bad Times Too"	3:58
4.	"Midget Sings"	3:09
5.	"Seven Miles"	3:53

Side Two
No.	Title	Length
1.	"Big Car Intro"	2:29
2.	"Big Car"	6:54
3.	"First Steps"	4:06
4.	"Rotund for Success"	3:23
5.	"LFM"	4:57

Side Three
No.	Title	Length
1.	"All Saints Day Original"	4:19
2.	"Bad Times Three"	5:22
3.	"The Star Spangled Bradbury"	3:08
4.	"LFM Dub"	4:18
5.	"Chasing Skirt"	3:18

Side Four
No.	Title	Length
1.	"Greater Reward"	4:16
2.	"Greater Dub"	7:12
3.	"Big Car Crash"	7:44
Total length:		1:21:58

== Personnel ==
- Tom Ellard – vocals, synthesizers, production
- Stephen Jones – photography, circuit design, video synthesizers
- Robert Racic – production
- Wayne Miller – co-production
- Adrian Bolland – co-production
- Repo Graphics – cover artwork
- Tony Mott – photography

== Release history ==
Region	Date	Label	Format	Catalog	Release Notes
Australia	1989	Nettwerk	LP	W1-30035	First vinyl pressing
Australia	1989	Volition Records	LP	VOLT 028	First vinyl pressing
North America	1989	Nettwerk	CS	W4-30035	First cassette pressing, same track list as the vinyl edition
North America	1989	Nettwerk	CD	W2-30035	First CD pressing, includes two extra tracks not included on the vinyl and cassette editions
Europe	1989	Volition Records	CD	VOLT 028	First CD pressing, includes two extra tracks not included on the vinyl and cassette editions
Australia	2002	Sevcom	CD-R	N/A	Sevcom CD-R reissue, includes four extra tracks, including the 1989 CD edition bonus tracks
United Kingdom	2004	LTM	CD	LTMCD 2404	LTM CD reissue, includes three extra tracks plus the 1989 CD edition bonus tracks
United States	2021	Medical Records	2LP	MR-089	Expanded version, with several bonus tracks from previous (re)issues, plus two 12" single remixes
