= Clean (Severed Heads album) =

Studio album by Severed Heads
- Released: 1981
- Recorded: 1981 at Terse Tapes, Australia
- Genre: Industrial, experimental
- Length: 37:15
- Label: Dogfood Productions, Terse Tapes, Sevcom, Dark Entries
- Producer: Tom Ellard

Severed Heads chronology
Side 2 (1980)	Clean (1981)	Blubberknife (1982)

Professional ratings
Review scores
Source	Rating
Rolling Stone	Positive
The Virgin Press	Positive

Clean is the second full-length studio album by the experimental Australian group Severed Heads, released in 1981 through Dogfood Productions and Terse Tapes, two labels that the band themselves operated. Originally released on vinyl and cassette formats, both of which contained unique artwork and were released in small quantities, the vinyl in particular only being released as an edition of 400. Ellard reissued it on CD-R in 2005 on his own Sevcom label, with the order shuffled, the song "Food City" removed, and bonus tracks. In 2020, the album was reissued on LP by Dark Entries in its original form, with a second LP featuring 14 bonus songs, five of which had never been released before, culled from live performances, the Side 3 cassette and a Clean demo tape that only resurfaced in 2019. It was also made available digitally on Bandcamp.

== Track listing ==
Side One
No.	Title	Length
1.	"Food City"	4:45
2.	"Our Own Home"	2:07
3.	"Charivari"	2:36
4.	"Nightsong"	7:04
5.	"Car Advertisement"	2:49

Side Two
No.	Title	Length
6.	"Love"	2:06
7.	"Don't Saxophone"	3:13
8.	"Book"	4:04
9.	"Tiny Fingers"	3:17
10.	"Heavily Tattooed Men + Women"	3:20
11.	"Violins And Moonlight"	3:37

2020 Dark Entries reissue 2nd LP

Side Three
No.	Title	Length
1.	"Stomach"	1:38
2.	"You Will"	2:49
3.	"Turtledove"	1:53
4.	"Flower"	3:15
5.	"Clean Loops"	10:53

Side Four
No.	Title	Length
6.	"Floopness"	1:08
7.	"Ladies + Gents Digital"	2:53
8.	"Somehow Pain"	2:33
9.	"Subjective"	1:34
10.	"Always Randy"	3:05
11.	"Unbreakable"	3:16
12.	"Traumat"	2:00
13.	"Opera"	2:11
14.	"Siren"	1:20

2005 Sevcom reissue track listing
No.	Title	Length
1.	"Love"	2:06
2.	"Don't Saxophone"	3:13
3.	"Book"	4:19
4.	"Tiny Fingers"	3:01
5.	"Heavily Tattooed Men + Women"	3:19
6.	"Violins + Moonlight"	3:36
7.	"Our Own Home"	2:06
8.	"Charivari"	2:36
9.	"Nightsong"	7:04
10.	"Advertisement"	2:55
11.	"Ladies + Gents Digital"	2:59
12.	"Somehow Pain"	2:33
13.	"Subjective Medicine"	1:52
14.	"Floopness"	1:14
15.	"Fifty Cycles"	4:27
16.	"Traumat"	2:16
17.	"Cowboy Muzak"	3:47
18.	"Dressed In Air"	1:47
19.	"Russian Rifles"	3:31
Total length:		58:42

== Release history ==
Region	Date	Label	Format	Catalog	Release Notes
Australia	1981	Dogfood Productions	LP	DOGMAT-1	Edition of 400
Australia	1981	Terse Tapes	CS	Terse 007	includes different artwork
Australia	2005	Sevcom	CD-R	N/A	Includes new track listing and bonus live material recorded in 1982 at The Film Makers
United States	2020	Dark Entries	LP	DE-265	Includes bonus tracks
