= Gigapus =

Studio album by Severed Heads
- Released: December 1994
- Recorded: 1992–1994
- Genres: Electronic dance music, synth-pop
- Length: 61:56
- Label: Volition Records
- Producer: Tom Ellard

Severed Heads chronology
Cuisine (With Piscatorial) (1991)	Gigapus (1994)	Haul Ass (1998)

Singles from Gigapus
- 1. "Heart Of The Party" Released: 1995

Professional ratings
Review scores
Source	Rating
Decibel	Positive

Gigapus is the tenth studio album by the Australian electronic music group Severed Heads. Recorded between 1992 and 1994, the album was first released in 1994 with a bonus CD-ROM disc titled Metapus that had additional multi-media content on it. Because of this, it is the first album released in Australia to include a CD-ROM disc. Due to the extra disc, the album was initially priced at $40 when it first came out. As with most of the Severed Heads discography, the album has been reissued multiple times.

== Track listing ==
All songs written by Tom Ellard.

No.	Title	Length
1.	"Heart of the Party"	3:45
2.	"Tiny Wounded Bird"	6:27
3.	"ANIMal"	4:06
4.	"The Importance of Hair"	4:52
5.	"Repetitive Strain Injury"	4:43
6.	"Arrivederci Coma"	5:56
7.	"DOLLARex"	6:05
8.	"Cabbalaland"	4:52
9.	"Snow"	4:10
10.	"Somewhere Over the Gigapus"	5:14
11.	"Courier"	3:39
12.	"Pure"	3:24
13.	"About Leah & Adele"	2:51
14.	"Nightime Falls"	3:06

In 1996, a re-recorded and remixed version of "DOLLARex" (4:59) was substituted for the original.

2001 Sevcom Reissue Bonus Tracks (Gigapus Plus HOTP)
No.	Title	Length
15.	"We Have Come to Remix the House (Boxcar)"	5:48
16.	"Snow (The Mrs. Joe's Brain Edit)"	4:20
17.	"Heart of the Party (Original Mix)"	5:14
Total length:		77:18

2009 Sevcom Reissue Bonus Disc (Gigaplus: Demos and Curios)
No.	Title	Length
1.	"We Have Come to Remix the House"	5:47
2.	"Snow (Remix)"	4:19
3.	"Heart of the Party (Remix)"	5:13
4.	"Dollarex (From Original Video 1993)"	4:23
5.	"First Resonant Bank (Demo)"	4:04
6.	"Calling All Goth Girls (Demo)"	4:04
7.	"Tenderizer (Sketch)"	3:28
8.	"The Importance Of Hair (Analogue Version)"	3:55
9.	"ANIMal (Digital Version)"	4:54
10.	"Life's Oven (Sketch)"	3:10
11.	"Cabbala Baby (Sketch)"	2:55
12.	"12 Inches of Snow (Demo)"	5:15
13.	"40box (Sketch)"	4:21
Total length:		50:55

15–17 of the 2001 reissue and 1–3 of the 2009 bonus disc were originally released as B-sides of the "Heart of the Party" CD single in Australia.

== Personnel ==
- Tom Ellard – vocals, production
- David Smith – additional electronics
- Comeron Miller – short wave radio
- Lisa Maxwell – additional vocals on "Heart Of The Party"
- David Allen – tambourine on "The Importance Of Hair" and "Somewhere Over The Gigapus"
- Adrian Bolland – engineering
- Kathy Naunton – mastering
- Robert Racic – mastering
- M.C. Newsagent – vocals on "Cabbalaland"
- Boxcar – production on "Heart Of The Party"

== Charts ==
Chart (1994)	Peak position
Australian Albums (ARIA)	105

== Release history ==
Region	Date	Label	Format	Catalog	Release Notes
Australia	1994	Volition Records	CD; CD-ROM	VOLTCD80	Issued with the CD-ROM Metapus and initially priced for $40
Australia	1994	Volition Records	2xCD	VOLTCD80	Contained a second disc composed of remixes of "Dead Eyes Opened"
Europe	1995	Dark Star	CD	Spark 62	European edition that included different mastering from the original Australian edition. This version has been described by Ellard as "horribly maimed with excessive bass"
Australia	1996	Volition Records	CD	VOLTCD80	First single-disc pressing
North America	1996	Decibel	CD	DEC007	First American pressing
North America	1996	Decibel	CD; CD-ROM	DEC007	First time the "Metapus edition" became available in North America
Australia	2001	Sevcom	CD-R	N/A	CD-R reissue that included new artwork and the entire "Heart Of The Party" single. The track "DOLLARex" was also renamed as "$ex (USA/Stacy)" on this version. Released under the name Gigapus Plus HOTP
Australia	2009	Sevcom	2xCD-R	N/A	Two disc reissue, the first being the original album, the second containing demos and remixes. Packaged in a DVD case. The track "DOLLARex" is renamed as "Dollarex (USA/Stacy)" on this version. Sometimes referred to as Giga++ or Gigapus++
