= Halfbird =

Studio album by Deerhoof
- Released: July 23, 2001
- Genre: Garage rock
- Length: 35:08
- Label: Menlo Park

Deerhoof chronology
Holdypaws (1999)	Halfbird (2001)	Koalamagic (2001)

Professional ratings
Review scores
Source	Rating
AllMusic	3/5 stars

Halfbird is the fourth studio album by American experimental rock band Deerhoof. It was released by Menlo Park Records in 2001.

== Composition ==
Halfbird works in "bluesy, punked-out" garage rock.

== Track listing ==
1. "Halfrabbit Halfdog" – 2:32
2. "Six Holes on a Stick" – 2:03
3. "Red Dragon" – 3:13
4. "Trickybird" – 3:05
5. "The Man, the King, the Girl and the Spider" – 2:08
6. "Witchery Glamour Spell" – 1:05
7. "Queen Orca Wicca Wind" – 2:44
8. "Sunnyside" – 2:02
9. "Carriage" – 3:25
10. "Littleness" – 2:45
11. "Xmas Tree" – 2:31
12. "Rat Attack" – 1:45
13. "The Forty Fours" – 1:10
14. "Halfmole Halfbird" – 4:40

== Personnel ==
- Rob Fisk – guitar
- Satomi Matsuzaki – vocals and bass guitar
- Greg Saunier – drums, guitar and vocals
