= Since the Accident =

Studio album by Severed Heads
- Released: 1983
- Recorded: 1982–1983 at Terse Tapes, Australia
- Genre: Industrial, experimental, dance, EBM
- Length: 44:38
- Label: Ink, Virgin, Nettwerk

Severed Heads chronology
Blubberknife (1982)	Since the Accident (1983)	City Slab Horror (1985)

Singles from Since the Accident
- 1. "Dead Eyes Opened" Released: February 1984

Since the Accident is the fourth studio album released by Australian electronic dance music group Severed Heads, first released in 1983. Released through Ink Records, it was the first major label release by the group. The album's lead single "Dead Eyes Opened" received critical and commercial success, peaking at #16 on the ARIA Charts. Throughout the years following the album's initial release in 1983, the recording has been reissued many times on multiple different formats through a variety of record labels.

== Background ==
According to Tom Ellard, Since the Accident was initially a C60 cassette tape that was recorded around the time Garry Bradbury began to want to leave the group. The tape, which was packaged in a folder, was given to Dave Kitson, an associate of Ink Records, and after he listened to it on repeat during a 14-hour train ride, he decided to help release an abridged version of the tape via Ink Records. Originally, "Dead Eyes Opened" was only left on the original cassette to help fill up the remaining blank space on the tape, and the spoken word sample used in the song originated from the TV series Scales of Justice.

== Reception ==
Professional ratings
Review scores
Source	Rating
AllMusic	3/5 stars
Brainwashed	Positive
Juno Download	Very Positive
Peek-A-Boo	80/100

In the Juno Download review, Since the Accident was described as "one of Severed Heads’ finest moments". In Sounds magazine, the album was described as "essential alternative sound" and later as "gutsy, emotional and melodic". Tom Ellard expressed his distaste for "Dead Eyes Opened", calling the track "insipid".

== Track listing ==
All songs written by Garry Bradbury and Tom Ellard unless indicated.
Original LP release: UK (Ink, INK 2), Europe (Red Flame/Virgin, 206 176), Australia (Ink/Virgin, INK 2)

Side One
No.	Title	Writer(s)	Length
1.	"A Relic of the Empire"	Ellard; Richard Fielding	1:01
2.	"A Million Angels"	Bradbury; Ellard; Simon Knuckey	3:07
3.	"Houses Still Standing"	Bradbury; Ellard; Knuckey	4:14
4.	"Gashing the Old Mae West"	Ellard	6:05
5.	"Dead Eyes Opened"	Ellard	3:22
6.	"Golden Boy"		4:22

"Golden Boy" ends in a locked groove, which has been handled in subsequent reissues by shutting off the tape, fading it out and cutting in playing it on a copy of the LP for a few loops.

Side Two
No.	Title	Length
7.	"Godsong"	4:30
8.	"Epilepsy '82"	3:40
9.	"Exploring the Secrets of Treating Deaf Mutes"	5:02
10.	"Brassiere, In Rome"	8:00
11.	"Wasps"	0:58

The Australian LP release starts side 2 with a lock groove of the beginning of "Wasps," which has only been reissued on the SevCom CD-R and Bandcamp downloads. "Wasps" is an uncredited track on every release but the Bandcamp download. The original cassette running order had two tracks removed to reduce it to LP length: "Desert Song" (after "Golden Boy"), which was later re-released as a CD/download bonus track, and "Alaskan Polar Bear Heater" (after "Big God Sky," the original title of "Godsong") which was reduced to the first 4:47 and included on the 1985 UK double LP Clifford Darling Please Don't Live in the Past as "APBH No. 1" and the Nettwerk/Volition 1989 reissue CD/cassette as "APBH (Number Two)."

Ink Records CD reissue: The Art of Noise: Volume 1 (1988, UK, INK CD002) bonus tracks
No.	Title	Writer(s)	Length
11.	"The Ant Can See Legs"		5:56
12.	"I Stand on My Head"		3:02
13.	"ACME Instant Dehydrated Boulder Kit" (Erroneously titled "Acme Dehydrated Boulder Kit")		4:32
14.	"Bullet"	Ellard	2:47
15.	"Mount"	Ellard	2:18

This CD was released without the consent of the band. "Brassiere, In Rome" and "Wasps" were both on track 10. 11-13 were taken from the "Goodbye Tonsils" 12" single. 14-15 were taken from the "Dead Eyes Opened" 12" single.

Nettwerk/Volition reissue: Since the Accident (With Tracks from Blubberknife) - 1983-1984 Part 1 (1989, Canada, W2-30039/VOLT 20/1 (CD), W4-30039 (cassette)) bonus tracks
No.	Title	Length
12.	"Adolf a Carrot?"	3:41
13.	"An American in Paris"	3:57
14.	"Tarzan's Grip"	2:58
15.	"That That Revolves"	5:05
16.	"Golden Boy Live"	4:14
17.	"Desert Song"	2:00
18.	"Alaskan Polar Bear Heater (Number Two)"	4:47

"Wasps" is uncredited as usual, but this wasn't accounted for in the track numbering on the packaging and label. One run of the CDs erroneously printed City Slab Horror on the spines. Only tracks 12-15 were originally released on the 1982 cassette Blubberknife. "Golden Boy Live" (from the Sedition performance in 1983) was previously unreleased. "Desert Song" and the full-length "Alaskan" were released on the original cassette version of this album.

Sevcom reissue CD-R (2003, Australia)/Bandcamp downloads bonus tracks
No.	Title	Writer(s)	Length
12.	"Golden Boy Live"		4:14
13.	"Desert Song"		2:00
14.	"Dead Eyes Opened Extended Version/1983 12""	Ellard	6:30
15.	"MoreNo"		4:00

The CD-R release was packaged in a DVD case and included the Side One and Australian Side Two locked grooves (both recorded from a copy of the LP) as their own untitled tracks (7 & 8), which made Side Two 9–13 and the above tracks 14–17. The Bandcamp reissue puts 7 & 8 into "Golden Boy" and "Godsong," respectively, making Side Two 7–11 again and the bonus tracks 12–15. "Wasps" and the previously unreleased "MoreNo" were not credited in the CD-R packaging.
In 2014, the American label Medical Records LLC reissued the LP in an edition of 1000 copies on half-black/half-white vinyl (MR-034).

== Personnel ==
- Tom Ellard - drum programming, synthesizers
- Garry Bradbury - drum programming, synthesizers
- Simon Knuckey - guitar [credited as Simon Insectocutor]
- Stephen Jones - video synthesizer
- J. Mansfield - recording, engineering
- Patrick Gibson - engineering, remixing
- Marx Town & Country Plan - design
- Severed Heads - design, composition
