= Come Visit the Big Bigot =

- The Nettwerk vinyl edition cover

Studio album by Severed Heads
- Released: 1 September 1986
- Recorded: December 1985
- Studios: Terse Tapes, Australia
- Genres: Industrial; experimental; EDM
- Length: 44:47
- Labels: Ink Records; Nettwerk
- Producers: Severed Heads; Topsy Keevil

Severed Heads chronology
City Slab Horror (1985)	Come Visit the Big Bigot (1986)	Bad Mood Guy (1987)

Singles from Come Visit the Big Bigot
- 1. "Twenty Deadly Diseases" Released: 1986; 2. "Propellor" Released: August 1986

Come Visit the Big Bigot (The Big Bigot on the Ink and Volition LP releases) is the sixth full length studio album by Australian experimental group Severed Heads, released in 1986. The tracks "Twenty Deadly Diseases" and "Propellor" were both released as singles to help promote the album. The title is a reference to the Big Merino statue in New South Wales; the 1998 Sevcom CD-R release has a photo of it on the cover.

== Reception ==
Professional ratings
Review scores
Source	Rating
AllMusic	3/5 stars
Resident Advisor	4/5 stars

Gabriel Szatan of Resident Advisor wrote, "Come Visit the Big Bigot captures [Severed Heads] in a point of transformation where the band's early psych experiments still linger, before [Tom] Ellard drove it deeper down a more electronic rabbit hole. For every chugging 'Propellor', there's also a skin-crawling nightmare like 'Sam Loves You', and that's not for everyone. But Severed Heads manage to look fabulous perched on a smouldering scrapheap." Trouser Press critic Ira Robbins said the album reveals the "development of a strong and cogent (treated) vocal electro-pop sensibility amid more familiar hubbub that might have been created by Martians armed only with [Brian] Eno's Here Come the Warm Jets and Orchestral Manoeuvres' first LP for templates."

== Track listing ==
All songs written by Tom Ellard, except "Strange Brew," written by Eric Clapton, Felix Pappalardi and Gail Collins.
Original album

Side One
No.	Title	Length
1.	"Come Visit the Big Bigot"	3:19
2.	"Twenty Deadly Diseases"	3:38
3.	"Army"	3:43
4.	"Phantasized Persecutory Breast"	3:03
5.	"Casey's Ion"	3:02
6.	"Propellor"	5:20
7.	"FM Stations Blow Up"	1:11

Side Two
No.	Title	Length
8.	"Confidence!"	6:02
9.	"SAM Loves You"	2:58
10.	"Strange Brew"	4:39
11.	"Harold and Cindy Hospital"	2:53
12.	"Legion"	4:54

- The Volition LP opens with the sound of an experiment Ellard did, in which he stuck a live microphone deep into a watermelon and dropped it from a second-story balcony. Footage of him doing this appeared on a segment about synthesis on the ABC program Edge of the Wedge. The words "THE SOUND OF A WATERMELON....!" were etched into the runout groove of Side One.
- The Ink and Volition LP releases had "George the Animal" (4:00) in the place of "Twenty Deadly Diseases," and did not credit "FM Stations Blow Up," but had it as the end of "Propellor," for a total length of 6:33.
- The "SAM" in "SAM Loves You" is the early speech synthesis program S.A.M. (Software Automatic Mouth).
- The Volition LP included the "Propellor" 12" EP, with "Propellor Two (Rotation Mix)," remixed by Topsy Keevil, and "Propellor Three (Kamikazee Mix)," "Twenty Deadly Diseases (Terminal Mix)," and "Harold and Cindy Hospital (Casualty Mix)," which were remixed by Robert Racic.

1998 Sevcom CD-R bonus tracks
No.	Title	Length
13.	"Son Of"	3:50
14.	"George the Animal"	4:00
15.	"Propellor 12 Inch"	5:10
16.	"Disease 21"	4:05
17.	"Disease 22"	4:54

This release marked the first time the album used the original digital master tapes. This resulted in some songs starting and ending at different points from the original release.

2012 Bandcamp (25 Years) digital release bonus tracks
No.	Title	Length
12.	"Son Of..."	3:55
13.	"...George the Animal"	4:00
14.	"20 Deadly Diseases (UK 12")"	6:32
15.	"Harold and Cindy Hospital (Marathon)"	6:48
16.	"Propellor (NYC 12")"	5:09

This version has "Propellor" and "FM Stations Blow Up" as one track, shifting side 2 to tracks 7–11. 15 is actually the Casualty Mix.

2017 Dark Entries 2LP/Bandcamp second LP tracks
No.	Title	Length
1.	"Harold and Cindy Hospital (Casualty Mix)"	6:49
2.	"Twenty Deadly Diseases (Extended Mix)"	6:30
3.	"Disease 22"	3:56
4.	"Disease 23"	3:48
5.	"Son Of"	3:50
6.	"George the Animal"	4:00
7.	"Nature 10"	3:13
8.	"Propellor Three (Kamikazee Mix)"	8:02

Side 3 is 1–4, Side 4 is 5–8. This version has a significantly edited (and uncredited) "FM Stations" coda at the end of "Propellor," total time 5:35.

== Personnel ==
- Tom Ellard - vocals, bass, keyboards, sound guns
- Stephen Jones - video tape, video synthesizers
- Oboreta Kyojin - drums, computers
- Topsy Keevil - choir, production
- Volition Records - cover (Ink and Volition releases)
- Steven R. Gilmore - photography, design, artwork (Nettwerk release)
- Greg Skyes - artwork, assistance (Nettwerk release)

== Release history ==
Region	Date	Label	Format	Catalog	Release Notes
United Kingdom	1986	Ink Records	LP	INK 022	First vinyl pressing
Australia	1986	Volition Records	LP	VOLT 007; VOLT 006	Special edition vinyl press that included the "Propellor" 12-inch single and special gatefold packaging. Art is the same as the Ink Records press
United States	1986	Nettwerk	LP	NTL 30003	Nettwerk vinyl pressing, including completely different artwork from the Ink pressing
Canada	1986	Nettwerk	CS	NTLC 30003	First cassette pressing, artwork similar to that of the Nettwerk vinyl press
Canada	1987	Nettwerk	CD	NTCD-31	First CD edition of the album, which was titled Come Visit The Big Bigot With Dead Eyes Opened. Included artwork similar to the Nettwerk vinyl/cassette versions and included the entire "Dead Eyes Opened" single attached in it
Australia	1998	Sevcom	CD-R	N/A	CD-R reissue, including different art and extra tracks attached to the end of the album
Australia	2012	Sevcom	DL	N/A	Remastered digital reissue released through the official Sevcom bandcamp page, which included art similar to the original 1986 Ink Records release and extra tracks attached to the end of the album
United States	2017	Dark Entries	2LP	DE180	Double disc remastered LP reissue, featuring bonus tracks
