= Richard Fielding =

- Born: Sydney, New South Wales, Australia
- Genres: EDM
- Occupations: Musician, radio presenter
- Instruments: Drum machine, tape loops
- Years active: 1975–present

Richard Fielding is an Australian musician who was a founding member of the electronic music group Severed Heads in 1979 in Sydney. He has been a member of other experimental, avant garde music groups such as Z-Glutz, The Loop Orchestra and Budgie Woops! He has had a career as a radio presenter on various New South Wales stations.

== Biography ==
Richard Fielding trained as a radio presenter in the mid-1970s with Korg Pally Oskin, Ian Borri Okem, Rusty Nails and, as part of a Sydney inner city (informal) group of "radio bad boys" called "The Thrifty Tones". He started as a presenter using the moniker 'Old Siddeley", on 2MBS—part of the "Late Night Collective". On sister station 5MBS with his own show "Yntmppry Yditions" and on Bega station 2BE, co-hosting the 'Good Morning Ghostbusters" program with local Bega star Ian Wright. His longest on-air partnership was in the 1980s at Sydney's 2RES-FM with Dan Mayok, on "Anything That's Jandy", which was broadcast Saturday mornings from 6 am – 9 am. His sign-off call was "Have a great day - I know I don't".

In 1979, Fielding formed an electronic group, Mr. and Mrs. No Smoking Sign, with Andrew Wright and they were soon joined by Tom Ellard. With Fielding on drum machine and tape loops, Wright on organ and synthesizer and Ellard on tapes they recorded a demo in Fielding's home. Renamed as Severed Heads they started recording their first album, Ear Bitten when Wright left in 1979. Fielding departed in 1981 during the recording of the band's second album, Clean.

He was also part of an unsuccessful venture called the "5 to 6 Federation" a self-styled "Electronic Green Movement" which proposed all radio stations go off air for 5 minutes every morning from 5:55 am to "clear the airwaves from constant radiowave transmissions". In the latter days of his broadcasting career he was a panel operator and technical producer at community radio station 2SER FM on The Mamma Lena Show and RadioActiviky with Dr Xob Schmottman.

Fielding was also a founding member of The Loop Quartet, which was formed in 1982, along with John Blades, Ron Brown and Jaimie Leonarder. During the same year, another group performing with reel-to-reel tape machines, The Loop Orchestra, was formed by Fielding, John Blades and Anthony Maher. In 1983, Peter Doyle joined the group, and this line-up remained until 1997.
