= Robert Racic =

Australian DJ and record producer

- Born: 8 January 1964; Melbourne, Victoria, Australia
- Died: 25 October 1996 (aged 32) Sydney, New South Wales, Australia
- Genres: Techno; house; pop
- Occupations: DJ; record producer
- Years active: 1982–1996
- Label: Volition

Robert Racic (8 January 1964 – 25 October 1996) was an Australian DJ and record producer. He was influential within the local electronic and house music circles, but was less well known internationally. Racic produced several top 10 Billboard dance hits including Volition Records' artists Severed Heads' "Greater Reward" and Boxcar's "Freemason", "Insect" and "Gas Stop". He died in 1996, aged 32, of a brain virus, JC virus, which caused progressive multifocal leukoencephalopathy.

== Biography ==
Robert Racic was born on 8 January 1964 and grew up in Melbourne. At the age of 18 he began working as a clerk at Waltons menswear store in Sydney. Soon after he was a DJ at the 45 Club, Kings Cross, on weekends and followed with other harbour city venues. He imported "New York garage and Chicago house records and as such became widely-regarded as 'benevolent godfather' to the nebulous Australian dance music scene."

In 1987 he recalled how he started remixing, "I got tired of the way some 12-inchers present themselves... I wanted to make them more exciting... so I bought myself a reel-to-reel recorder, sat down and started to edit". One of his first remixes was of Nona Hendryx' "I Want You" from The Art of Defense (1984), which was played on 2 JJJ radio by Tim Ritchie.

In 1986 Racic started working with experimental music group, Severed Heads, he collaborated with their founder, Tom Ellard, on their sixth album, Come Visit The Big Bigot (September 1986). Racic "would remix selected tracks for the dance floor market." In May of the following year he edited and mixed tracks for the group's seventh album, Bad Mood Guy (October 1987).

Racic co-produced "Thief" (July 1988), a single, by Rockmelons with the band's members Bryon Jones, his brother Jonathon Jones, and Raymond Medhurst (see Tales of the City).
