= Steppin' On =

"Steppin' On Remix"
- 1994 remix

Single by Sexing the Cherry
- Released: 1993
- Studio: Sony Studios, Sydney
- Length: 4:03
- Label: Second Nature; Sony
- Songwriter(s): Cherryn Lomas; Edwin Morrow; Luke Paramor
- Producer(s): Robert Racic; Sexing the Cherry

Sexing the Cherry singles chronology
"Steppin' On Remix" (1993)	"Glamorous" (1995)

"Steppin' On" is a song by Australian group Sexing the Cherry, originally featured on the 1992 compilation album High (A Dance Compilation). The song was first released as a single in 1993, before being re-released as "Steppin' On Remix" in 1994, after which it peaked at number 42 on the ARIA Charts. It was also included on the Heartbreak High soundtrack.

== Critical reception ==
In 2022, The Music reviewed the song, writing: "Brisbane isn't long remembered for its contribution to the 90s dance scene, but Sexing the Cherry tried to turn that around with this dance-floor banger that peaked just outside the top 40. Bit of saxophone. Big soaring chorus. What wasn't to like? Check out the high note at 3:10."

== Track listings ==
"Steppin' On Remix" CD maxi

1. "Steppin' On" (Radio edit) – 4:03
2. "Steppin' On" (Keepin' On mix) – 10:05
3. "Steppin' On" (Dubin' On mix) – 8:19
4. "Steppin' On" (Don't Stop the Music mix) – 9:49
5. "Steppin' On" (Don't Stop the Sax mix) – 7:48

== Charts ==
Chart performance for "Steppin' On Remix"
Chart (1994)	Peak position
Australia (ARIA)	42
