= Paul Sonkkila =

Australian actor

- Born: 27 March, 1944; Rockhampton, Queensland, Australia
- Died: 1 April, 2016 (aged 72); Australia
- Occupation: Actor

Paul Sonkkila (27 March, 1944 – 1 April 1, 2016) was an actor of stage and screen who trained in Australia and in London. He had a long career in theatre, but is remembered for his cinematic roles in The Interview (1998), The Year of Living Dangerously (1982), Sons And Daughters (1982), The Illustrated Family Doctor (2005) and Daybreakers (2009). He was a regular presence for over 20 years in Australian drama.

== Personal life ==
Sonkkila was born in Rockhampton, Queensland, Australia, on March 27, 1944. He died on April 1, 2016, aged 72.

== Sons And Daughters ==
In Sons and Daughters, Sonkkila played Martin Healey, father of John Palmer and Angela Hamilton Keegan. Martin Healy appeared from Episode 186 to Episode 252 in 1983. In the early 1960s, Martin is a married man with one child and another on the way when he begins an affair with 17-year-old Melbourne teenager Patricia Dunne. When Patricia tells him she is pregnant, Martin arranges for her to have a termination, while keeping secret that he is also involved with her sister, Margaret Dunne. Soon afterwards he moves away with his family and joins the air force, eventually becoming a pilot who serves in Malaya and Vietnam. By the early 1980s he has risen to the rank of Group Captain, though he now works at a desk rather than flying. After the death of his wife Sandra in 1978, Martin lives with his younger son Peter and adopted daughter Jennifer, while his eldest son Adam has already left home. One of his regrets is that neither of his sons wishes to follow him into the air force.

In 1983 he receives an unexpected visit from John Palmer, the son he believed Patricia had aborted. Martin begins to build a relationship with John and reconnects with Patricia, although John’s twin sister Angela Hamilton is far less willing to get to know him. Martin encourages John to pursue a career in the air force and interferes in John’s engagement to Jill Taylor after learning she was formerly a prostitute, manipulating events so that she ends their relationship.

Tensions also develop within Martin's family when Jennifer returns from overseas pregnant with Adam's child, and Martin later clashes with Peter after Peter fails to repair the catch on the family swimming pool gate, allowing a neighbour's young daughter to enter the yard and drown in the pool; in anger, Martin retaliates by holding Peter underwater for several seconds. As Patricia becomes increasingly busy, Martin briefly turns to Margaret again, who later tells him that Jennifer has had an abortion arranged by Patricia.

Although initially furious, Martin reconciles with Patricia and asks her to marry him, and she accepts, but Margaret later reveals that Patricia intends to leave him at the altar as revenge for the way he treated her years earlier. Meanwhile, Martin's problems worsen further when Peter receives a letter from Adam claiming that Martin had been responsible for the death of Jennifer's father, Barry, during the Vietnam War after leaving him behind to die.

== Filmography ==
=== Film ===
Year	Title	Role	Type
1980	Stir	McIntosh	Feature film
1981	Gallipoli		Feature film
1982	The Year of Living Dangerously	Kevin Condon	Feature film
1984	Chase Through the Night	Darby	Feature film
1995	The Feds: Suspect	Commander Rock	TV movie
1996	Mr. Reliable	Norm Allan	Feature film
1997	The Last of the Ryans	Governor Ian Grindlay	Feature film
1998	The Interview	Detective Inspector Jackson	Feature film
2005	The Illustrated Family Doctor	Snapper Johnson	Feature film
2009	Daybreakers		Feature film

=== Television ===
Year	Title	Role	Type
1982	Sons and Daughters	Martin Healey	TV series
1986	The Great Bookie Robbery	Merv Temple	TV miniseries
1989	The Magistrate	Hannaford	TV miniseries
	Phoenix		TV series
1995	Halifax f.p.	Jane's colleague	TV series, Season 1, episode 4: "My Lovely Girl"
1995	Sky Trackers	Frank Giles	TV series
1995	Blue Murder	Detective Superintendent Noel Morey	TV miniseries
2014	Rake	Father Bobby	TV series, Season 3, episode 5
