= Dual Plover =

- Founded: 1995
- Founder: Lucas Abela; Swerve Harris
- Genre: Electronic; Noise; Outsider
- Country of origin: Australia
- Official website: http://dualplover.com/

Dual Plover (stylized dualpLOVER) is an Australian independent record label founded in Sydney in 1995 by Lucas Abela and Swerve Harris. Dual Plover's first release called "a kombi – music to drive-by" consisted of recordings from a Volkswagen Kombi van originally recorded at Waverley Cemetery in September 1994.

From 1996 onwards they have been manufacturing CDs and DVDs as well as touring artists such as Kevin Blechdom, Al Duval and many others, both in their native Australia as well as internationally.

== Notable artists from past and present ==
- Al Duval
- Alternahunk
- Bradbury
- Deerhoof
- Deano Merino
- Justice Yeldham and the Dynamic Ribbon Device
- Mascara Sue
- Merzbow
- Naked on the Vague
- New Waver
- Noise Ramones
- Peeled Hearts Paste
- Singing Sadie
- Sister Gwen McKay
- Sweden (artist)
- Suicidal Rap Orgy
- Spazmodics
- Toxic Lipstick
- Volvox (band)
- Winner (band)

== See also ==
- List of record labels
- Category:Australian record labels
- Experimental music
