= Diversional therapy =

Therapy that promotes the involvement in leisure, recreation and play

- ICD-9-CM: 93.81

In Australia, Diversional Therapy “is a client centred practice [that] recognises that leisure and recreational experiences are the right of all individuals.” Diversional Therapists promote the involvement in leisure, recreation and play by reducing barriers to their client's participation and providing opportunities where the individual may choose to participate and perform their occupation. Ideally these recreational activities promote self-esteem and personal fulfillment, through an emphasis on holistic care; providing physical, psychological, social, intellectual and spiritual/cultural/temporal support.

Diversional Therapists work in a wide variety of settings, such as Rehabilitation & hospital units, Justice Centres, Community Centres, Day and Respite services, Aged Care Residential Facilities, Ethnic Specific Services, Palliative Care Units and Outreach Programmes, Mental Health Services, Specialist Organisations, Private Practice and Consultancy & Management.

The diversional therapist works with a client to achieve positive health outcomes by incorporating leisure programmes into their lifestyles. He or she assists decision-making and participation when developing and managing these programmes. These are often quite diverse and can range from:

- Games, outings, gardening, computers, gentle exercise, music, arts and crafts.
- Individual emotional and social support
- Sensory enrichment, activities like massage and aromatherapy, pet therapy
- Environmental enrichment activities like role play, modeling
- Discussion groups, education sessions like grooming, beauty care, cooking
- Social, cultural and spiritual activities

== Becoming a Diversional Therapist ==
To become a diversional therapist in Australia you must complete a diploma or degree in diversional therapy or leisure and health studies and this course needs to be recognised by the Diversional Therapy Association of Australia.

National Certificate in Diversion Therapy may be completed in New Zealand with a prerequisite of Level 3 Core Competencies qualification, which is a basic all-round groundwork course. This course of study would approximately take 18 months to complete. The diversional therapy courses are usually offered by institutions that focus on practical learning and skills, teaching about the roles of the diversional therapist and developing the ability to create a plan of care.

== See also ==
- Recreational therapy
- Leisure
