= Holdypaws =

Studio album by Deerhoof
- Released: July 13, 1999
- Genre: Indie rock, avant-garde, noise pop
- Length: 42:23
- Label: Kill Rock Stars
- Producer: Deerhoof

Deerhoof chronology
The Man, the King, the Girl (1997)	Holdypaws (1999)	Halfbird (2001)

Professional ratings
Review scores
Source	Rating
AllMusic	3/5 stars
Pitchfork	5.7/10

Holdypaws is the third studio album by American experimental rock band Deerhoof. It was released in 1999 on Kill Rock Stars, and reissued on vinyl by the same label on November 22, 2019, to commemorate the 25th anniversary of Deerhoof. Jamie Stewart of Xiu Xiu, a band that has worked with Deerhoof's Greg Saunier, has praised this album, saying "I had never heard anything like it before. It completely blew my mind and changed the way I thought about what music could be." Henry Rollins has praised this album, in addition to the band's EP Green Cosmos, saying "it gets the blood going. What a band."

== Track listing ==
All songs written by Deerhoof.

1. "Magic Star"
2. "Queen of the Lake"
3. "The Moose's Daughter"
4. "Satan"
5. "Crow"
6. "Flower"
7. "Lady People"
8. "The Great Car Tomb"
9. "Dead Beast Queen"
10. "Data"

== Personnel ==
- Rob Fisk – guitar
- Satomi Matsuzaki – bass guitar and vocals
- Greg Saunier – drums and vocals
- Kelly Goode – keyboard
