= Boxcar (band) =

Australian band

- Origin: Brisbane, Queensland, Australia
- Genres: Synth-pop; techno; house; electronica
- Years active: 1986–1997; 2010; 2014
- Labels: Volition/Sony; Arista/Nettwerk
- Past members: Carol Rohde; David Smith; Brett Mitchell; Crispin Trist; Stewart Lawler; David Corazza; Alison Cole; James Wingrove
- Website: boxcar.com.au

Boxcar were an Australian electronic dance pop group formed in Brisbane in 1986. Their founding mainstay was David Smith on vocals, guitar and keyboards. Three of their singles appeared on the Billboard dance chart top 20, "Freemason (You Broke the Promise)" (1988, No. 8), "Insect" (1990, No. 20) and "Gas Stop (Who Do You Think You Are?)" (1990, No. 8). They released two albums on Volition Records, Vertigo (1990) and Algorhythm (1994), before disbanding in 1997. They briefly reformed in 2010 and in 2014.

== History ==
Boxcar were an Australian electronic dance pop band. They formed in 1986 in Brisbane by Carol Rohde on vocals and keyboards (ex-Ironing Music) and David Smith on vocals, guitar and keyboards. They were soon joined by keyboardist, Brett Mitchell, and somewhat later by drummer-percussionist Crispin Trist.

Boxcar independently issued cassette-only material including an album, P.C.M.. Their early work sounded similar to contemporaries, Cabaret Voltaire and Severed Heads. Australian musicologist, Ian McFarlane, explained "the intention was to combine noise with a beat, technology with a decent song." AllMusic's Michael Sutton felt they "sounded more like New Order [the similarity] is mainly in the weary vocals of [Smith], which easily recalls Bernard Sumner's melancholic tone."

Boxcar played live shows in the Brisbane area and then other capitals; at gigs they wore gas masks. Performing electronic music live was a difficult feat given the preference in Australian live venues for guitar-driven pub rock and they would sometimes be jeered by members of the crowd. McFarlane observed "[they] made little headway, mostly due to a general lack of interest in electronic dance-pop within the rock milieu, rather than any lack of talent on the musicians' part."

They signed with Volition Records/BMG Arista/Ariola to release a single, "Freemason (You Broke the Promise)", in November 1988. When issued in the United States via Arista Records/Nettwerk Records in the following year, it hit No. 8 on the Billboard dance chart. Initially criticised in the local press for being derivative of New Order they nevertheless built a local following, despite a lack of commercial radio airplay for electronic music. They followed with two more singles, which also appeared on the Billboard dance chart: "Insect" (remixed by noted producer Arthur Baker) at No. 20 and "Gas Stop (Who Do You Think You Are?)" (remixed by Francois Kevorkian) at No. 8. In Australia, "Gas Stop" peaked at No. 82 on the ARIA singles chart.

The group's first album on Volition, Vertigo, was released in November 1990. Boxcar's line-up was Mitchell on additional programming; Rohde on keyboards and programming; Smith on vocals, guitars and keyboards; and Trist on drums and programming. It was produced by Robert Racic (Severed Heads, Single Gun Theory) and recorded at Sun Studios, CBS Studios, and Albert Studios, Sydney.

Vertigo received mixed reviews from critics: AllMusic's William Cooper rated it at two-and-a-half stars out-of five and explained "[a]lthough the New Order inspired arrangements are derivative, Vertigo is redeemed by Boxcar's upbeat, catchy melodies"; McFarlane opined that it "was a very accessible collision of sound, song and dance beats." It had a fairly pop feel, however the band also included more experimental instrumentals, such as "Comet" (also on the B-side of the "Freemason" single) and "Lelore" (featuring an eerie wailing as the centrepiece "vocal", which was released as a single in its own right). The group toured Australia as supports for New Order, Depeche Mode, Erasure and then Pet Shop Boys.

In 1992 Rohde and Trist left the group, which relocated to Sydney, where they added a keyboardist, Stewart Lawler. In September of that year they issued a remix album, Revision, with re-workings of Vertigo' tracks by various producers. One of the remixers is Tom Ellard from Severed Heads.

Boxcar's second studio album, Algorhythm, was released in November 1994. The Canberra Times' Nicole Leedham reported "[it] is pure techno and is best heard on a dance floor, but if your house doesn't come equipped with one of those the best alternative is to light some candles and lose yourself in the hypnotic sound." McFarlane noticed "[i]t was another modern-sounding album without being too clean or sterile."

Algorhythm was a notably more trance and house-influenced effort than the synth-pop of Vertigo and provided the singles "Universal Hymn", "What Are You So Happy About?" (featured on the soundtrack to the 1996 film Love and Other Catastrophes) and "People Get High". The album took almost another two full years until it was released in the United Kingdom and Europe in 1996 on Pulse-8. Although not officially defunct, it was around about 1997 that Boxcar started to play fewer live dates.

In October 2007, an announcement was made of their return gig participating in the Upgrade night at QUT. There is also a new track on their website, named for the infamous Atari ST game, Llamatron. It is also indicated that Brett Mitchell is no longer a member of the band.

Boxcar are featured in "BNE - The Definitive Archive: Brisbane Independent Electronic Music Production 1979-2014", which is a hardcover book and USB music archive published by Trans:Com in September 2014. Boxcar contributed 3 previously unreleased tracks to BNE, and reformed to headline the launch event on 6 September 2014 at the Brisbane Powerhouse, with a lineup that included David Smith, Alison Cole, James Wingrove, and original member David Corazza.

== Discography ==
=== Albums ===
List of albums, with selected chart positions
Title	Album details	Peak chart positions
Title	Album details	AUS
Vertigo	Released: 19 November 1990; Label: Volition Records/Sony	118
Revision	Released: September 1992; Note: Remix album	154
Algorhythm	Released: November 1994	116

=== Singles ===
Year	Single	Peak chart positions			Album
Year	Single	AUS	UK	US Dance	Album
1988	"Freemason (You Broke the Promise)"	—	—	8	Vertigo
1989	"Insect"	143	—	20	Vertigo
1990	"Gas Stop (Who Do You Think You Are)"	82	—	8	Vertigo
1991	"Lelore"	186	—	—	Vertigo
1992	"Hit & Run"	172	—	—	Revision
1993	"Universal Hymn"	149	—	—	Algorhythm
1994	"What Are You So Happy About?"	113	—	—	Algorhythm
1996	"People Get High"	—	139	—	Algorhythm
"—" denotes releases that did not chart or were not released in that country.

== Awards and nominations ==
=== ARIA Music Awards ===
The ARIA Music Awards is an annual awards ceremony that recognises excellence, innovation, and achievement across all genres of Australian music.

Year	Nominee / work	Award	Result
1995	"What Are You So Happy About"	Best Dance Release	Nominated
