= Bad Mood Guy =

- The Nettwerk LP/CD edition cover

Studio album by Severed Heads
- Released: October 1987
- Recorded: May 1987 at CBS Studios
- Genre: Industrial, experimental, EDM
- Length: 42:57
- Label: Volition Records, Nettwerk
- Producer: Severed Heads

Severed Heads chronology
Come Visit the Big Bigot (1986)	Bad Mood Guy (1987)	Rotund for Success (1989)

Singles from Bad Mood Guy
- 1. "Hot With Fleas" Released: December 1987

Professional ratings
Review scores
Source	Rating
Rolling Stone	Positive
Rockpool	Positive

Bad Mood Guy is the seventh studio album by the Australian experimental group Severed Heads, first released in 1987. Upon its initial release, the album met positive reviews with critics, one in particular referring to it as "punishing pop with crunching rhythms". The album's lead single "Hot With Fleas" did well on independent radio stations, peaking at #4 on Rockpool's dance charts during the week of 31 December 1987. In 2002, after an attempt at making a version 2 of the album which was aborted due to the master DAT tape being irreparably damaged, Tom Ellard made a new version available on CD-R on his SevCom label, which substituted demo and live versions of some tracks and added extra material. This version (with some album versions of songs restored as bonus tracks) is what Tom made available on the official Severed Heads Bandcamp page. In 2023, the UK label Futurismo, Inc. released a remastered version of the album on two different pressings of 2LP set (with the first LP on either "Fleabitten Rash" (purple with hot pink inkspot) or "Jetlag Metal" (solid metallic silver) coloured vinyl, and second on standard black) containing a 12-page "Bad Mood Booklet" styled after the zines Ellard would publish and sell via mail order in the mid-late 80s to augment the albums. They also released it on CD in a standard Digipak with a foldout insert reproducing parts of the booklet. All these versions had artwork redone by Ellard.

== Track listing (original 1987 release) ==
All tracks are written by Tom Ellard

Side One
No.	Title	Length
1.	"Hot with Fleas"	3:20
2.	"Nation"	5:26
3.	"Unleash Your Sword"	3:31
4.	"Jetlag"	4:49
5.	"Contempt"	5:09

Side Two
No.	Title	Length
6.	"Bad Mood Guy"	2:42
7.	"Dressed in Air"	4:01
8.	"Rabbi Nardoo Flagoon"	6:48
9.	"Heaven is What Heaven Eats"	2:46
10.	"Mad Dad Mangles Strad"	4:25

== Track listing (2002 SevCom reissue) ==
All tracks are written by Tom Ellard

No.	Title	Length
1.	"Hot with Fleas (original)"	3:22
2.	"Canine"	5:07
3.	"Nature 10"	3:13
4.	"Contempt"	3:06
5.	"Jetlag Up (live)"	4:57
6.	"Jetlag Down (live)"	4:00
7.	"Dressed in Air"	4:08
8.	"Bad Mood Guy"	2:44
9.	"Nation (12 inch)"	4:15
10.	"Unleash Your Sword"	3:29
11.	"Rabbi Nardoo Flagoon"	5:22
12.	"Heaven is What Heaven Eats"	2:49
13.	"Mad Dad Mangles Strad"	4:25
14.	"'I've Always Hated Severed Heads' (Live Excerpt)"	4:57
15.	"Bolero with Fleas"	5:59
16.	"Nation (original)"	5:28
17.	"Jetlag (original)"	4:49
18.	"Contempt (Robert's Edit)"	5:08

- 2: Edited version of the B-side of the "Hot with Fleas" 12" single.
- 3: From the compilation album Nettwerk Sound Sampler: Food for Thought.
- 9: Edited version of the B-side of the "Greater Reward" 12" single.
- 16–18: Added to the Bandcamp release.

== Track listing (2023 Futurismo, Inc. reissue) ==
First LP/CD track 1–10 as per the original 1987 release. 10 credited as "Mad Dad Mangles a Strad."

All tracks are written by Tom Ellard

No.	Title	Length
11.	"Bad Mood Guy (Day 1)"	2:43
12.	"Unleash Your Sword (Day 1)"	3:34
13.	"Canine (Day 1)"	4:34
14.	"Nature 10 (Terse)"	3:14
15.	"Contempt (Day 1)"	2:43
16.	"I've Always Hated Severed Heads (Live)"	3:37
17.	"Hot With Fleas (12" Remix)"	7:20
18.	"Nation (NYC Mix)"	4:15
19.	"Canine (12" Remix)"	6:50

LP side C: Tracks 11–16; Side D: Tracks 17–19.

== Personnel ==
- Tom Ellard - vocals, programming, mixing
- Robert Racic - editing, mixing
- Steven R. Gilmore - artwork, design
- Andrew Penhallow - assistant mixing
- Nick Mainbridge - assistant mixing

== Release history ==
Region	Date	Label	Format	Catalog	Release Notes
Australia	1987	Volition Records	LP	VOLT 010	First vinyl pressing
Canada	1987	Nettwerk	LP	NTL30018	Nettwerk vinyl pressing, includes completely different artwork
Canada	1987	Nettwerk	CD	NTCD 33	First CD press, includes same art as the Nettwerk vinyl pressing
Canada	1987	Nettwerk	CS	NTLC 30018	First cassette press, includes same art as Nettwerk vinyl pressing
Australia	2002	SevCom	CD-R	N/A	Sevcom CD-R reissue that includes entirely different artwork and different/extra content
UK	2023	Futurismo, Inc.	2LP, CD	FTRSMO40; FTRSMO40B; FTRSMO42	Remastered with new artwork and bonus tracks, including previously unreleased versions of songs.
