= The Man, the King, the Girl =

Studio album by Deerhoof
- Released: October 28, 1997
- Genre: Noise rock
- Label: Kill Rock Stars

Deerhoof chronology
The Man, the King, the Girl (1997)	Holdypaws (1999)

Professional ratings
Review scores
Source	Rating
Allmusic	4/5 stars

The Man, the King, the Girl is the second studio album by American experimental rock band Deerhoof. It was released on Kill Rock Stars.

== Track listing ==
1. "Tiger Chain"
2. "Polly Bee"
3. "Sophie"
4. "A-Town Test Site"
5. "Gold on Black"
6. "For Those of Us on Foot"
7. "Gore in Rut"
8. "Wheely Freed Speaks to the People"
9. "Bendidin"
10. "Itchy P-Pads"
11. "The Pickup Bear"
12. "The Comedian Flavorists"
13. "Queen of the Mole People"
14. "Kneil" (live)
15. "Gore in Crown" (live)
16. "Carriage" (live)
17. "The Mausker" (live)
18. "Gold on Black" (live)

== Personnel ==
- Rob Fisk – guitar
- Satomi Matsuzaki – vocals
- Greg Saunier – drums
