= Under Gail Succubus =

Studio album by Severed Heads
- Released: 19 August 2006
- Genre: Electronic dance music, ambient
- Length: 93:24
- Label: Sevcom
- Producer: Tom Ellard

Severed Heads chronology
Op2.5 (Millenium Cheesecake) (2005)	Under Gail Succubus (2006)	Op3 (2007)

Under Gail Succubus is the twentieth studio album by Severed Heads, twelfth if you don't count the Op and Music Server series of albums. Released in 2006, the double disc recording was released in two editions: The standard edition, packaged in a DVD case with transparent artwork, and the metal box edition, which was packaged in a tin box. Ellard later expressed regret for the metal box edition, for it would usually come in damaged in some way during mail order delivery. The album itself is a double disc set, the second disc, sometimes referred to as Over Barbara Island, would later be issued as its own separate album on iTunes.

== Track listing ==
All tracks are written by Tom Ellard

Disc One
No.	Title	Length
1.	"Snuck"	3:22
2.	"Lo Real"	4:03
3.	"Three Doors"	3:42
4.	"Under Gail Succubuss"	2:39
5.	"Inside The Girl"	3:51
6.	"Psychic Squirt"	4:04
7.	"Theme From The Surface"	2:39
8.	"Death Tickle"	4:14
9.	"Takin' Out The Surfin' Bird"	4:41
10.	"Bruise Vlenna Part 1"	3:25
11.	"Bruise Vlenna Part 2"	3:12
12.	"Bruise Vlenna Part 3"	2:18
13.	"Bruise Vlenna Part 4"	1:32
14.	"Bruise Vlenna Part 5"	2:56
Total length:		46:38

Disc Two
No.	Title	Length
1.	"Over Barbara Island Part 1"	5:11
2.	"Over Barbara Island Part 2"	5:38
3.	"Over Barbara Island Part 3"	6:40
4.	"Over Barbara Island Part 4"	5:48
5.	"Over Barbara Island Part 5"	5:57
6.	"Over Barbara Island Part 6"	5:17
7.	"Over Barbara Island Part 7"	5:57
8.	"Over Barbara Island Part 8"	6:18
Total length:		46:46
