= City Slab Horror =

Studio album by Severed Heads
- Released: 1985
- Recorded: 1983–1984 at Terse Tapes, Australia
- Genre: Industrial, experimental EDM
- Length: 43:33
- Label: Ink Records
- Producer: Severed Heads, Topsy Keevil

Severed Heads chronology
Since the Accident (1983)	City Slab Horror (1985)	Come Visit the Big Bigot (1986)

Singles from City Slab Horror
- 1. "Goodbye Tonsils" Released: February 1985

City Slab Horror is the fifth studio album by the Australian experimental pop music group Severed Heads. First released in 1985 through Ink Records, it was their second major label album release, following 1983's Since the Accident. The track "Goodbye Tonsils" was released as a single to promote the album, which met favorable reviews from some critics and no reviews at all from the vast majority of the remaining critics.

== Reception ==
Professional ratings
Review scores
Source	Rating
Allmusic	4/5 stars
Brainwashed	Positive
Sounds Magazine	4.5/5 stars

Andy Hurt of Sounds magazine wrote that it is "one of the most accomplished, complete works in recent years" and gave the record 4.5 stars out of five. Another reviewer commented that "with [City Slab Horror], the Heads have cemented their place at the forefront of the electronic experimentalists".

== Track listing ==
All songs written by Paul Deering and Tom Ellard unless indicated.
Original LP release: UK (Ink, INK 9)

Side One
No.	Title	Writer(s)	Length
1.	"Spasm"		0:21
2.	"Spastic Crunch"		2:52
3.	"Spitoon Thud"		4:42
4.	"4.W.D"	Ellard	3:11
5.	"Ayoompteyempt"		3:11
6.	"The Bladders of a Thousand Bedouin"		2:54
7.	"Now, an Explosive New Movie"	Ellard	3:49

Side Two
No.	Title	Writer(s)	Length
8.	"Guests"		5:28
9.	"We Have Come to Bless This House"	Ellard	3:57
10.	"Cyflea, Rated R"		3:36
11.	"Goodbye Tonsils"	Garry Bradbury; Ellard	4:15
12.	"Voices of the Dead"	Deering	5:17

Nettwerk/Volition reissue: City Slab Horror (With Tracks from Blubberknife) - 1983–1984 Part 2 (1989, Canada, W2-30033/VOLT 20/2 (CD), W4-30033 (cassette)) bonus tracks

No.	Title	Writer(s)	Length
13.	"Umbrella"	Bradbury; Ellard	4:24
14.	"Power Circles"	Ellard	3:08
15.	"The Ant Can See Legs"	Ellard	5:53
16.	"I Stand on My Head"	Bradbury; Ellard	2:58
17.	"ACME Instant Dehydrated Boulder Kit"	Bradbury; Ellard	4:29

One run of the CDs erroneously printed Since the Accident on the spines. Only track 13 was originally released on the 1982 cassette Blubberknife. "Power Circles" was previously released as "Power" on Ellard's 1983 solo cassette Snappy Carrion, and then as its new title on the 1985 2LP compilation Clifford Darling Please Don't Live in the Past. 15–17 are the B-side tracks of the "Goodbye Tonsils" 12" single.
Sevcom reissue CD-R (2004, Australia)/Bandcamp downloads bonus tracks

No.	Title	Writer(s)	Length
13.	"Goodbye Tonsils (12" Version)"	Bradbury; Ellard	8:12
14.	"The Ant Can See Legs"	Ellard	5:53
15.	"I Stand on My Head"	Bradbury; Ellard	2:58
16.	"ACME Instant Dehydrated Boulder Kit"	Bradbury; Ellard	4:29

13–16 are from the "Goodbye Tonsils" 12" single.
Sevcom reissue CD-R bonus disc VB Slab Error (2004, Australia)/Bandcamp downloads bonus tracks

No.	Title	Writer(s)	Length
1.	"Guests (Live at Ozone, 1984)"		5:04
2.	"Mong Dong (Live at Ozone, 1984)"	Bradbury; Deering; Ellard	5:21
3.	"Cyflea, Rated R (Live at Ozone, 1984)"		5:21
4.	"Aethereal CCCP"	Deering	6:54
5.	"Huhmahbubbuh"	Deering	6:19
6.	"Cracking on Rough"	Ellard	2:48
7.	"Sophistication"	Ellard	2:28
8.	"Harold and Cindy Demo"	Ellard	3:48
9.	"Live in Vancouver 1985"	Ellard	3:58
10.	"Blast Patter"	Ellard	3:03
11.	"Plastic Man from the Outer West"		3:16

4 & 5 are excerpts of the Nothing on 45 performance on 2MBS-FM, December 2, 1983, which was released on the two-cassette compilation Lunokhod. 10 was previously released on the "Gashing the Old Mae West (Marathon Mix)" 12" single. The rest of the songs were previously unreleased.
In 2014, the American label Medical Records LLC reissued the LP in an edition of 1000 copies on "bone-white" colored vinyl (MR-035).

== Personnel ==
- Tom Ellard - recording, mixing, self importance, sequencing, tapes, drum programming
- Garry Bradbury - recording, sequencing, drum programming, tapes
- Paul Deering - recording, drum programming, sequencing, tapes
- Stephen Jones - video synthesizers
- Topsy Keevil - production
- Margaret Woods - recording
- Mark Town & Country Plan - artwork
