= Tom Ellard =

Australian electronic musician

- Born: Thomas Temple Ellard; 1962 (age 63–64)
- Genres: Experimental, electronic, synth-pop, IDM, industrial (Early years)
- Occupation: Musician
- Instruments: Vocals, synthesizers, drum programming, tape loops
- Years active: 1979–present
- Labels: Sevcom, Nettwerk, Volition, Ink, Terse Tapes
- Website: nilamox.com

Thomas Temple Ellard (born 1962) is an Australian electronic musician best known as the founding member of the electronic and industrial music group Severed Heads.

== Early life ==
Ellard's first music contributions began in the late 1970s as a teenager when he was influenced by groups that emerged from the early United Kingdom and Australian punk movement.

Predating music technology such as MIDI and personal computers, Ellard's early work was performed with tape machines, tape loops and basic analogue equipment. In 1979, Richard Fielding and Andrew Wright formed an electronic dance group called Mr. and Mrs. No Smoking Sign, and they were soon joined by Ellard.

== Career ==
Fielding renamed the group Severed Heads. Through the 1980s, Ellard began to take advantage of technological developments such as the music sequencer in combination with looping sounds before sampling arose. Severed Heads were probably most well known in Australia for chart success with a 1994 remix of the track "Dead Eyes Opened" (initially released in the early 1980s), which made the Australian top 40. Ellard is also noted for his early contributions to the electronic and industrial music movements in Australia and overseas.

In 2013, Ellard created the interactive game Hauntology House. He has expressed interest in the computer-gaming platform many times in interviews.

== Awards ==
In 2005, Ellard received the Australian Record Industry Association's ARIA Music Award for the best original soundtrack/cast/show for the soundtrack to the Australian film The Illustrated Family Doctor.

== Personal life ==
As of 2006, Ellard resides in Surry Hills, Sydney and continues to record music and soundtracks. He also lectures at a variety of educational facilities on music production in Australia. He is the creator and director of tomellard.com, a website for alternative methods of music distribution and creation.

== Discography ==
=== Solo albums ===
- Snappy Carrion (1982)
- 80's Cheesecake (1982)
- Return To Barbara Island (2010)
- Meteosat 2004 (2013)
- Barbara Channel 3 (2014)
- Rhine (2015)
- Publicist (2018)
- Barbara rUFO (2018)

=== With Severed Heads ===
- Side 2 (1980)
- Clean (1981)
- Blubberknife (1982)
- Since The Accident (1983)
- City Slab Horror (1985)
- Come Visit The Big Bigot (1986)
- Bad Mood Guy (1987)
- Rotund For Success (1989)
- Cuisine (With Piscatorial) (1991)
- Gigapus (1994)
- Haul Ass (1998)
- Under Gail Succubus (2006)

=== With CoKlaComa ===
- Coklapop (1996)
- Maximus (1999)
- It's All Good! (2000)

=== With ButchCrutch ===
- Ebolaball (2021)
