= Severed Heads =

Australian electronic music group

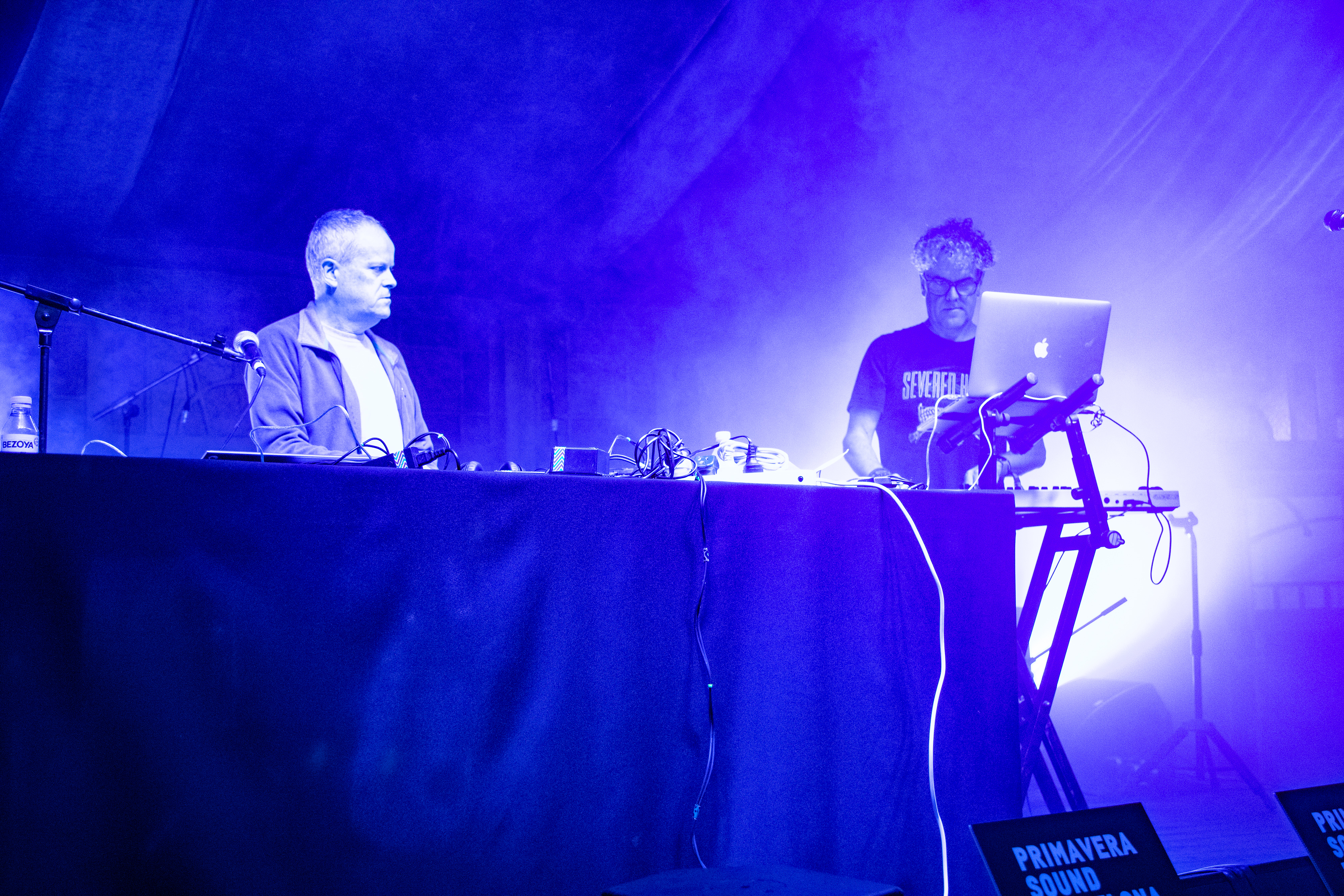
- Severed Heads performing at Primavera Sound, 2019.

Background information
- Also known as: Mr. and Mrs. No Smoking Sign
- Origin: Sydney, New South Wales, Australia
- Genres: Industrial, experimental, electronic, dance, ambient, synth-pop, post-punk, noise, EDM, IDM, avant-garde
- Years active: 1979–2008; 2010–2011; 2013; 2015–2019
- Labels: Terse Tapes, Wrong, Dogfood Production System, Virgin, Ink, Red Flame, Volition, Nettwerk, CBS, Sony, LTM, Dark Entries, Medical, Sevcom
- Spinoffs: Coklacoma, ButchCrutch
- Past members: Tom Ellard; Stewart Lawler; Richard Fielding; Andrew Wright; Garry Bradbury; Simon Knuckey; Stephen Jones (1951-2026); Paul Deering

Severed Heads were an Australian electronic music group founded in 1979 as Mr and Mrs No Smoking Sign. The original members were Richard Fielding and Andrew Wright, who were soon joined by Tom Ellard. Fielding and Wright had both left the band by mid-1981 with Ellard remaining the sole consistent member for the rest of the band's existence. Throughout the next decade, several musicians joined Severed Heads' ranks, including Garry Bradbury, Simon Knuckey, Stephen Jones and Paul Deering.

In 1984 the band released "Dead Eyes Opened" as a single, which was remixed in 1994 and re-released, reaching No. 16 on the ARIA Singles Chart. Two of their singles, "Greater Reward" (1988) and "All Saints Day" (1989), reached the top 30 on the Billboard Hot Dance Club Songs chart. Ellard disbanded the group in 2007 and continued with other projects. Subsequent Severed Heads reunions have occurred: in 2010 for a 30th-anniversary concert, in 2011 in support of Gary Numan's tour of Australia, again in 2011 at BimFEST in Antwerp, in 2013 with a gig at the Adelaide Festival of Arts and in September 2015 with a tour of the United States for the first time in more than 20 years. In November 2016, Severed Heads played at the State Library of Victoria as part of Melbourne Music Week and in November 2017 they headlined a one-off double act along with Snog at the Corner Hotel in Richmond, Victoria. Severed Heads announced that they would again disband following headlining shows in September 2019.

== History ==
=== Early years and independent releases (1979–1982) ===
In 1979, Richard Fielding and Andrew Wright formed an experimental electronic duo, Mr. & Mrs. No Smoking Sign, in Sydney. By the end of that year, Tom Ellard joined the group. The group issued cassette albums, including Mr. and Mrs. No Smoking Sign Go Cruising fer Burgers! In December 2006, Ellard explained the name change: "[W]e were called Mr. & Mrs. No Smoking Sign, because that was really ugly. Then, we wanted to fool people that we were Industrial and it worked. Severed Heads was a really dumb name, so that's what stuck. Forever. I hate it by the way."

The group's early music was characterised by the use of tape loops, noisy arrangements of synthesisers and other dissonant sound sources in the general category of industrial music. Wright departed late in 1979, leaving the duo of Ellard and Fielding to put together the band's early studio offerings, including the A-side of a split album, Ear Bitten/No Vowels, No Bowels, with the B-side by Rhythmyx Chymx. Fielding departed the band during the recording of 1981's Clean, leaving much of the work to be completed solely by Ellard.

Severed Heads began incorporating elements of more conventional pop music such as a consistent 4/4 rhythm via drum machines, strong melodic lines, resolving chord arrangements, synthesized bass lines, and Ellard's thin but gently eerie vocals and elliptical, poetic lyrics. The result was a striking hybrid of avant-garde industrial and pop-rock. The group moved their live shows from "experimental venues and art spaces to rock clubs", and they issued the Blubberknife and 80's Cheesecake albums in 1982 after expanding to include synthesiser player Garry Bradbury and guitarist Simon Knuckey. Following the release of these albums, Severed Heads were also joined by video expert and musician Stephen Jones.

=== Major label years and mainstream success (1983–1998) ===
1983 saw British label Ink Records issue Since the Accident, which was later released by Nettwerk records in North America and Volition Records in Australia. AllMusic's John Bush described the album as not "quite a crossover effort" with the lead single, "Dead Eyes Opened", being "surprisingly melodic synth-pop". The band's recording deals led to a world tour, which became a multimedia event with the addition of video synthesisers performed by Jones. After the tour, Severed Heads returned to Australia in August 1984. However, this period saw more personnel change for the band. Bradbury had departed during the recording of Since the Accident in 1983 (leaving most of the recording to Ellard) and Knuckey departed soon before the 1984 world tour, so the lineup that went on tour consisted of Ellard, Jones and the newly recruited Paul Deering.

In 1985, Severed Heads issued City Slab Horror, again on Ink Records for the European market. For this album, Bradbury returned as guest musician and contributed to vocals and songwriting. Clashes with Ellard caused Deering to leave the band in order to continue working with Bradbury. In October that year, Jon Casimir of the Canberra Times described the group as "Australia's most innovative electronic band", which had an "obsession with the ugly and horrific" with music "reminiscent of Cabaret Voltaire and Throbbing Gristle." The A.V. Club's Sean O'Neal later drew comparisons to Kraftwerk, Orchestral Manoeuvres in the Dark, Fad Gadget and Chris & Cosey.

Local label Volition compiled international tracks for the local-only album Stretcher in November 1985. In August the following year, the band followed with Come Visit the Big Bigot. During that year, Ellard and Jones took Severed Heads on a European and North American tour. Bad Mood Guy was issued by Volition in October 1987. The Canberra Times' Kathryn Whitfield felt the group had "gone way beyond experimental" to provide "a commercially viable product" while Ellard reflected "we have just worked carefully and solidly in an area that we think is good".

Severed Heads peaked at No. 19 in the United States on the Billboard Hot Dance Club Songs chart in 1988 with the 12-inch single "Greater Reward", which later appeared on the album Rotund for Success, issued in October 1989. The album included several remixes by Sydney-based producer Robert Racic, who produced tracks for the band through the late 1980s and early 1990s and contributed to their sound. Another single to make the Billboard chart was "All Saints Day" in 1989, which reached No. 25.

In 1989, Nettwerk and Volition re-released Since the Accident and City Slab Horror, each with tracks from Blubberknife, for the first time on CD. The releases were cut from the original masters resulting in superior quality compared to the original Ink Records releases which Ellard later remarked were "cut from a tape of a tape".

In 1992, one year after the release of Cuisine (With Piscatorial), Jones left the band, leaving Ellard as the group's sole official member. Nettwerk did not renew its contract with the band, leaving Severed Heads adrift in the marketplace. Ellard sought out another label for his next release, Gigapus, in 1994, which was released on Volition in Australia and Decibel Records in the US. Around this time, the band had a major Australian hit with a remixed version of "Dead Eyes Opened", which samples Edgar Lustgarten reading from Death on the Crumbles. Both Volition and Decibel soon folded, and once again, Severed Heads were unaligned with the traditional music industry, and they did not fully own the rights to their music. This changed in 1998 when Sony Music released claims to Volition material.

=== Later years and subsequent releases (1999–2007) ===
With his music back in his hands, Ellard began developing an independent music system, entirely Internet-based, at sevcom.com. During the early 2000s, Ellard developed several innovative products, such as the Sevcom Music Server, a subscription-based ambient music distribution system.

Ellard has worked on a side project, Coklacoma, that released a few albums in the late 1990s and early 2000s. By 2004, he was heavily involved with developing video but increasingly felt that the Severed Heads label was a thing of the past, and in 2008 opted to jettison the name. Ellard also worked extensively during the 1990s with other Sydney-based electronic musicians and groups such as Paul Mac (of Itch-E and Scratch-E) and Boxcar, former alumni of the now-defunct Volition label, as well as with the Lab.

=== Dissolutions and reunions (2008–2019) ===
In early 2008, Ellard announced that Severed Heads were now defunct and that no further creative output would be released under the name. However, the band was reformed by Ellard and new member and longtime friend Stewart Lawler for a 30th-anniversary show on 14 January 2010 as part of the annual Sydney Festival, and in May 2011 the group supported Gary Numan in a tour celebrating the 30th anniversary of Numan's album The Pleasure Principle. In a May 2011 interview, Tom Ellard explained: "Some people thought it was a bit rude of me to just shut it down without a proper farewell tour and so we decided we would drag it out just one more time and say our toodly-doodly's." On 22 October 2011, Severed Heads played what was intended to be their final performance in Australia Joan Sutherland Centre, Promotional material at the Joan Sutherland Performing Arts Centre. At BimFEST 2011 in Antwerp, they performed what was billed as their "absolutely final" performance as Severed Heads. However, Ellard and Lawler performed what was again intended to be a final gig at the Queen's Theatre during the Adelaide Festival of Arts in 2013, a concert that was recorded by Australian Broadcasting Corporation.

Since 2014, several older Severed Heads albums have been released on vinyl via Medical Records and Dark Entries, such as Since the Accident and City Slab Horror. 2016 saw the release of the Beautiful Arabic Surface 10" acetate dub plate, which contained the first newly recorded Severed Heads tracks since their announced hiatus in 2008. The single was released through Bughlt Records in a limited edition of 45 copies.

Renewed interest in the band resulted in a seven-date American tour in September 2015, their first performances in the United States in over 20 years. Following these tour dates, the project remained active with new recordings, further reissues and live performances.

Severed Heads again split up after a string of headlining shows in the US in September 2019. On the band's Bandcamp page selling the Living Museum live compilation, they stated: "The 2019 shows were the last bye bye for Severed Heads in Australia, Europe and the USA, and we thank all the people who came out to see us off. We look forward to 2020 and new nilamox* STUFF."

== Influence ==
Vancouver-based industrial band Skinny Puppy was influenced by early Severed Heads material. A relationship was formed between the bands which led to Severed Heads being signed to Nettwerk Records and a joint 1986 North American tour. Tom Ellard was known to have participated in some of the band's "brap" sessions, leading to production and performance credits on the Skinny Puppy songs "Assimilate" and "Chainsaw" (on Bites and the Chainsaw single, respectively).

Australian electropop musician Paul Mac of Itch-E and Scratch-E has stated that, "I thought Severed Heads were the future. They were such an inspiration for Australian[s] who were doing dance music and electronic music, because they were the future."

Trent Reznor (of Nine Inch Nails), Orbital, and Boy Harsher have all cited Severed Heads as an influence.

== Personnel ==
=== Members ===
Final lineup

- Tom Ellard – vocals, bass, keyboards, synthesisers, electronic percussion (1979–2008, 2010–2011, 2013, 2015–2019)
- Stewart Lawler – synthesisers (2010–2011, 2013, 2015–2019)

Former members

- Richard Fielding – synthesisers (1979–1981)
- Andrew Wright – synthesisers (1979)
- Garry Bradbury – synthesisers, electronic percussion, vocals (1982–1983; guest musician - 1984–1985)
- Simon Knuckey – guitars (1982–1984)
- Stephen Jones – synthesisers, video synthesisers (1982–1992; died 2026)
- Paul Deering – synthesisers (1984–1985)

=== Lineups ===
1979 (Mr. and Mrs. No Smoking Sign)	1979	1979-1981	1981-1982
Richard Fielding - synthesisers; Andrew Wright - synthesisers	Richard Fielding - synthesisers; Andrew Wright - synthesisers; Tom Ellard - vocals, bass, keyboards, synthesisers, electronic percussion	Richard Fielding - synthesisers; Tom Ellard - vocals, bass, keyboards, synthesisers, electronic percussion	Tom Ellard - vocals, bass, keyboards, synthesisers, electronic percussion
1982	1982	1982-1983	1983-1984
Tom Ellard - vocals, bass, keyboards, synthesisers, electronic percussion; Garry Bradbury - synthesisers, electronic percussion, vocals	Tom Ellard - vocals, bass, keyboards, synthesisers, electronic percussion; Garry Bradbury - synthesisers, electronic percussion, vocals; Simon Knuckey - guitars	Tom Ellard - vocals, bass, keyboards, synthesisers, electronic percussion; Garry Bradbury - synthesisers, electronic percussion, vocals; Simon Knuckey - guitars; Stephen Jones - synthesisers, video synthesisers	Tom Ellard - vocals, bass, keyboards, synthesisers, electronic percussion; Simon Knuckey - guitars; Stephen Jones - synthesisers, video synthesisers
1984-1985	1985-1992	1992-2008	2008-2010
Tom Ellard - vocals, bass, keyboards, synthesisers, electronic percussion; Stephen Jones - synthesisers, video synthesisers; Paul Deering - synthesisers	Tom Ellard - vocals, bass, keyboards, synthesisers, electronic percussion; Stephen Jones - synthesisers, video synthesisers	Tom Ellard - vocals, bass, keyboards, synthesisers, electronic percussion	Disbanded
2010-2011	2011-2013	2013	2013-2015
Tom Ellard - vocals, bass, keyboards, synthesisers, electronic percussion; Stewart Lawler - synthesisers	Disbanded	Tom Ellard - vocals, bass, keyboards, synthesisers, electronic percussion; Stewart Lawler - synthesisers	Disbanded
2015–2019
Tom Ellard - vocals, bass, keyboards, synthesisers, electronic percussion; Stewart Lawler - synthesisers

== Discography ==
- Ear Bitten/No Vowels, No Bowels (1980)
- Side 2 (1980)
- Clean (1981)
- Blubberknife (1982)
- Since the Accident (1983)
- City Slab Horror (1985)
- Come Visit the Big Bigot (1986)
- Bad Mood Guy (1987)
- Rotund for Success (1989)
- Cuisine (With Piscatorial) (1991)
- Gigapus (1994)
- Haul Ass (1998)
- Contoured Simulation (1998)
- Airconditioning Your Productivity (1999)
- Gashing and Kato (2001)
- Op1.0 (2002)
- Cubical Broadcasts (2002)
- Controlling Time (2003)
- Op2.0 (2004)
- Op2.5 - Millennium Cheesecake (2005)
- Under Gail Succubus (2006)
- Op3.0 (2007)

== Awards and nominations ==
=== ARIA Music Awards ===
The ARIA Music Awards is an annual awards ceremony held by the Australian Recording Industry Association. They commenced in 1987.

Year	Nominee / work	Award	Result	Ref.
2005	The Illustrated Family Doctor	Best Original Cast or Show Album	Won	
