= The Illustrated Family Doctor =

- Directed by: Kriv Stenders
- Starring: Samuel Johnson; Colin Friels; Paul Sonkkila
- Music by: severed heads
- Release date: 2005
- Running time: 102 minutes
- Country: Australia
- Language: English
- Box office: A$51,895 (Australia)

The Illustrated Family Doctor is a 2005 Australian film. At the ARIA Music Awards of 2005 the soundtrack won the ARIA Award for Best Original Soundtrack, Cast or Show Album.

== Synopsis ==
Gary Kelp is a young man who condenses reference books for a living. The more involved Gary gets with condensing a medical journal called "The Illustrated Family Doctor", the more he mysteriously begins to exhibit symptoms referenced in the book, resulting in his life gradually unravelling.

== Cast ==
- Samuel Johnson as Gary Kelp
- Colin Friels as Ray Gill
- Kestie Morassi as Jennifer
- Jessica Napier as Christine
- Jason Gann as Carl Lucas
- Paul Sonkkila as Snapper Johnson
- Clayton Jacobson as Phil
- Sacha Horler as Carol Kelp
- Helmut Bakaitis as John

== Soundtrack ==
1. "Pour Chiens Moyens" - 5:50
2. "Chiens Annex" - 1:22
3. "Mosquito" - 6:14
4. "Starts With K" - 4:31
5. "Snakes Triumphant" - 2:05
6. "Moon Pie" - 5:59
7. "AAA Mr Hot Water" - 6:25
8. "Ballet Suharto L Dopa" - 5:28
9. "Automated Fanfare" - 6:37
10. "The Big One" - 2:56
11. "Runaway Christine" - 1:36
12. "Street Apparitions" - 1:46
13. "Teeth x3 Orthodontist" - 1:36
14. "Dead Cowboys" - 1:58
15. "Awake " - 0:42
16. "Escape" - 3:49
17. "Maudlin Baubles" - 6:43
18. "Your Kidneys (With Dr. Cherry) - 3:04
