= Stephen Jones (musician) =

Australian video artist (1951–2026)

- Born: Stephen Raoul Jones; 23 January 1951; Sydney, New South Wales, Australia
- Died: 8 October 2026 (aged 75) Sydney, New South Wales, Australia
- Genre: Electronic
- Occupations: Video artist; author; curator; musician; archivist
- Instruments: Synthesiser; video synthesiser
- Years active: 1975–2025
- Website: the-synthetic-image.com

Stephen Raoul Jones (23 January 1951 – 8 October 2026) was an Australian video artist, writer and curator. Born in Sydney, Jones, together with Tom Ellard, was a principal member of Severed Heads from 1982 to 1992. He developed analog video synthesizers for the production of video art and for use in Severed Heads' live performances and music videos.

Jones created many video art and documentation works from 1975. Hunting For the Future (1977) is a documentation of Nam June Paik and Charlotte Moorman's Art Gallery of New South Wales visit in 1976 – it is now housed in the collections of the Art Gallery of NSW and the Queensland Art Gallery, as well as included in Tell Me, Tell Me, an MCA Offsite exhibition that toured South Korea in 2011. Jones and Warren Burt created Three Texts in 1977 at La Trobe University. His Stonehenge, TV Buddha and Tai Chi Transforms (The Systems Interfacing Reports) work (1976-'78) is included in the National Gallery of Australia.

He also worked as a video post-production engineer. In 1996, he received the New Media Arts Fellowship to work on The Brain Project, a website dedicated to the science of consciousness. In 2007 he received a PhD studying the history of the electronic arts in Australia to 1975. Jones also maintained a private archive documenting artworks and exhibitions of art and technology based artists.

In 2013, Jones was guest curator for Artspace's 'This is Video exhibition as part of ISEA 2013. The exhibition revisited the 1981 exhibition Video Art from Australia which had been presented in Venice and subsequently toured through Australia.

Jones' book Synthetics: Aspects of Art and Technology in Australia, 1956 – 1975 was published by MIT Press in their Leonardo Book Series. Scanlines said the book "has become the definitive work in the field in Australia".

On 6 October 2026, Jones was attacked outside his studio in Sydney. He was taken to Royal Prince Alfred Hospital, where he died on 8 October, at the age of 75.
