= Volition Records =

Australia-based record label

- Founded: 1984
- Founder: Andrew Penhallow
- Defunct: 1997
- Status: Inactive
- Genre: Techno, house, electronica, synthpop, Indie pop
- Country of origin: Australia
- Location: Sydney

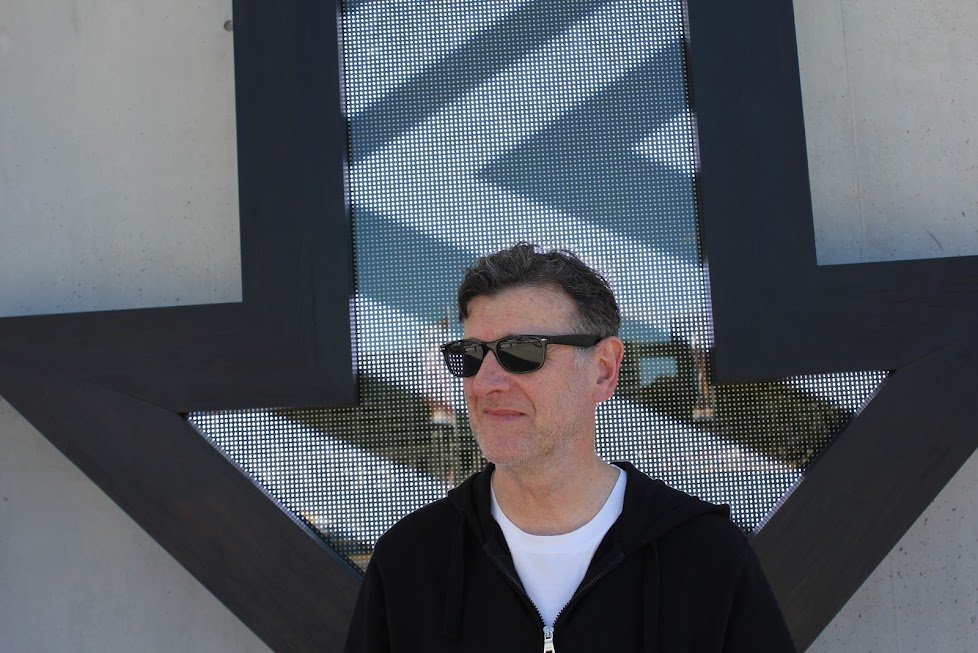
Andrew Penhallow, founder of Volition Records

Volition Records was a Sydney, Australia-based record label specialising in electronic music styles such as house, techno, synthpop, and trance. It was founded by Andrew Penhallow and was active from 1984 to around 1997.

== History ==
Andrew Penhallow founded Volition after he earlier created GAP Records with Paul Gardiner (1945-2004), which licensed British post-punk recordings from UK labels Rough Trade and Factory Records as well as releasing Australian bands such as Pel Mel. He chose the name to reflect its meaning "the faculty or power of using one's will"

Volition is widely credited with the early and successful promotion of techno and electro music - “what would usually be seen as underground music into the mainstream consciousness”. The label's cult status attracted aficionados of the underground who could previously only buy imports of overseas dance acts. "If you were all loved up with the dance music scene in the 1990s, you had several Volition CDs in your collection"

Amongst the roster of Volition were Severed Heads, Boxcar, Itch-E and Scratch-E, Single Gun Theory, FSOM, Southend, Vision Four 5, Sexing The Cherry, and Robert Racic. Robert Racic (1964-1996) was a record producer and co-collaborator with many of the artists on the label, was integral to much of Volition's output during most of the label's existence and was, to some extent, its unofficial "house producer". Volition also signed indie pop guitar bands such as the Falling Joys, Big Heavy Stuff, and Swordfish.

Severed Heads' “Dead Eyes Opened” reached No 16 on the ARIA Charts, South End’s Olympic tribute “The Winner Is….” Reached No 9, and Sexing The Cherry and Single Gun Theory also charted in the ARIA Top 50. Falling Joys charted on the album charts with Psychohum and Aerial.

Penhallow successfully lobbied the Australia Record Industry Association to introduce a Best Dance Release category in the annual ARIA Music Awards. In 1995, the first year of the category, three of the five nominations were Volition acts (and Volition won with Itch-E and Scratch-E). The following year, Itch-E and Scratch-E were again nominated and Volition act FSOM won in the category.

In 1994, Penhallow worked with New Zealand music producer Alan Jansson to release Proud: An Urban-Pacific Streetsoul Compilation through Volition offshoot label Second Nature. Proud highlighted previously unrecorded or unknown Pacifika hip hop and RnB acts and is now regarded as one of the most essential New Zealand albums of all time.

Also in 1994, Penhallow co-founded the Boiler Room for the annual Australian music festival Big Day Out, run by Ken West and Viv Lees.

Ben Suthers from Big Day Out said, "A whole pile of bands, like Severed Heads, Itch-E and Scratch-E, Boxcar, and Vision Four 5, they were all signed to Volition. Ken went to Andrew and went, 'Let's do a dance thing'. Andrew came up with the name Boiler Room, and I worked with him putting those shows together." As interest in raves and dance clubs grew, the Boiler Room went on to become one of the major draws of the Big Day Out and was copied throughout the world.

After Volition went into hiatus in 1997, Andrew Penhallow concentrated on artist management, music publishing, music synchs, and A&R. He produced and compiled a dozen compilation albums of dance and electronic music sourced exclusively from Australian artists, producers, and DJs, including the Australian dance compilation series “A Higher Sound”.

Penhallow managed and worked with ARIA nominated hip hop artist Citizen Kay, blues rock artist Jack Biilman, Nantes and songwriter David Rogers, Quails and songwriter Amy Pez, DJ Adam Stivala (Jerkboy / Pablo Calimari), DJ Craig Obey, DJ Stephen Allkins (Love Tattoo), and country-tinged singer-songwriter T. Wilds among many others.

Andrew Penhallow was diagnosed with throat and neck cancer in February 2023 and died from multiple organ failure on 17 May 2023.

== See also ==
- List of record labels
- List of electronic music record labels
