= Bare =

Bare literally means fully or partially naked, or figuratively used it means minimal.

Bare may also refer to:

== People ==
- Bare (surname)
- Jader Volnei Spindler (born 1982), Brazilian football player nicknamed "Bare"

== Places ==
- Bare Island (disambiguation)

=== Bosnia and Herzegovina ===
- Bare, Busovača
- Bare (Goražde)
- Bare (Hadžići)
- Bare (Jajce)
- Bare (Konjic)
- Bare (Posušje)
- Bare (Rudo), in Rudo
- Bare, Visoko, in Visoko, Bosnia and Herzegovina
- Bare cemetery, in Sarajevo

=== Cameroon ===
- Baré, Cameroon

=== Ethiopia ===
- Bare (woreda)

=== Kosovo ===
- Bare, Kosovo, a village in Mitrovica district

=== Iran ===
- Bare, East Azerbaijan
- Bare, West Azerbaijan

=== Italy ===
- Bàre

=== Montenegro ===
- Bare, Kolašin
- Bare, Šavnik
- Bare, Nikšić, a village near Nikšić

=== Romania ===
- Báré, the Hungarian name for Bărăi village, Căianu Commune, Cluj County, Romania

=== Serbia ===
- Bare (Knić)
- Bare (Kraljevo)
- Bare (Požarevac)
- Bare (Prijepolje)
- Bare (Rekovac)
- Bare (Sjenica)

=== United Kingdom ===
- Bare, Morecambe, Lancashire, England

=== United States ===
- Bare Butte, a summit in Texas

== Music ==
- Bare (Annie Lennox album), 2003
- Bare (Barb Jungr album), 1999
- Bare (Wayne Hussey album), 2008
- Bare (EP), by Little Nobody
- Bare: A Pop Opera, a musical story of two gay high school students
- "Bare", a song by Anthrax from Stomp 442
- B.A.R.E in the Woods, a music festival held in Portarlington, County Laois, Ireland

== Other uses ==
- Bare (magazine), 1999-2001 UK women's lifestyle magazine
- Bare (2015 film), a drama film
- Bare (upcoming film), a drama film
- Bare, a 1991 autobiography of singer George Michael, co-written by Tony Parsons

== See also ==
- Bear (disambiguation)
- Baer (disambiguation)
