= Punters Club =

Pub and live music venue

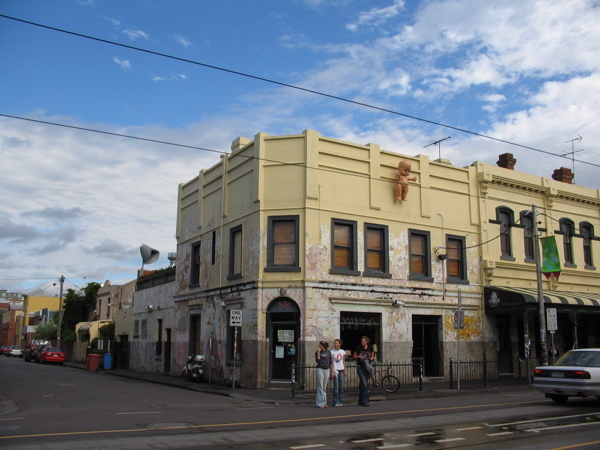
- Exterior of Bimbo Deluxe (2005)

- Location within Victoria

General information
- Location: 376 Brunswick Street, Fitzroy, VIC 3065
- Coordinates: 37°47′45″S 144°58′44″E
- Opened: 1865: 1865 (as the Wheatsheaf Hotel); 1893 (as the Moonee Valley Hotel); 1987 (as the Punters Club; original); 2002 (as Bimbo Deluxe); 2021 (as Kewpie); 2024 (as the Punters Club; new)
- Closed: 2002 (as the Punters Club; original); 2020 (as Bimbo Deluxe); 2024 (as Kewpie)

The Punters Club is a pub and live music venue located on Brunswick Street, Fitzroy, in inner Melbourne, Victoria, Australia.

During its original run as the Punters Club, it developed a reputation as one of the city's premier live music venues, drawing comparisons to the likes of New York's CBGB. It was also noted for its rough, alternative, yet casual atmosphere with audiences sometimes sitting on the floor while watching bands.

== History ==
=== Prehistory and rebranding (1863–1993) ===
The building was constructed between 1863 and 1865, and was originally known as the Wheatsheaf Hotel. In 1893, the venue rebranded as the Moonee Valley Hotel.

In 1987, Rob Guerini and Ric DiPietro became the new owners of the Moonee Valley Hotel, and the venue was renamed to the Punters Club Hotel. The new owners began to promote the hotel as a live music venue. It played a broad and eclectic range of music, such as rock, indie rock, electronica, nu country, lo-fi, metal, Celtic and ska. The venue helped launch the careers of a number of successful Australian bands, including Frente!, Magic Dirt, Something for Kate, Spiderbait and You Am I.

=== Matt Everett's ownership and closure (1993–2002) ===
Mat Everett took over the Club in 1993 and operated it until its closure.

From 1995, the Punters Club nurtured a close relationship with local purveyors of live electronic music, such as IF? Records (with their Zoetrope (sessions) and Clan Analogue, and regularly played host to live acts like Zen Paradox, Little Nobody, Artificial, Andrez Bergen, Voiteck, TR-Storm, Blimp, Son Of Zev, Isnod, Soulenoid, Guyver 3, Frontside, Half Yellow, and Honeysmack.

During the late 1990s Brunswick Street began to change, with a number of more mainstream establishments replacing what had been a much more alternative area. This resulted in a significant increase in property rents all along the strip, and when the Punters Club's lease came up for renewal in 2002, Everett saw continuing as unsustainable. The club closed its doors on 17 February 2002, with a twelve-hour music marathon that featured Gaslight Radio, Rocket Science, Pre-Shrunk, TISM and The Beat End Profilers.

=== Bimbo Deluxe and reunions (2002–2018) ===
The venue later became a pizza bar, Bimbo Deluxe. After a two-year hunt for another venue, Everett bought the Commercial Hotel in High Street, Northcote—an area that was developing a similar atmosphere to that of Brunswick Street in the 1980s. In late 2004 he reopened the venue as the Northcote Social Club, which maintains a very similar nature, bands and clientele to that of the Punters Club.

Melbourne band The Lucksmiths wrote a song entitled "Requiem for the Punters Club" as a tribute to the venue.

On 27 and 28 November 2010, Punters Club reunion gigs were held at the Corner Hotel in Melbourne, featuring bands such as Spiderbait, Hoss, Guttersnipes, The Glory Box, Frente!, The Fauves and The Hollowmen.

=== Upstairs fire, Kewpie and new Punters Club (2018–present) ===
Bimbo Deluxe suffered a fire in the upstairs level in May 2018. It was reopened that August, and continued until closing down in 2020 due to COVID-19. In November 2021, Kewpie Nightclub opened in the premises and operated until abruptly closing in mid-2024.

On 2 July 2024, it was announced that the building had been purchased by new owners, aiming to restore the former Punters Club name to the complex and create a space paying tribute to Australia's 90s music scene, while restoring the exterior of the building to match the venue's appearance in the 1990s. Two days later, the new owners were revealed to be a consortium composed of Jet bassist Mark Wilson and several prominent Melbourne pub owners. It was also stated that a new bandroom would be opened on the upstairs level of the venue.

The venue reopened on the 22nd August 2024, and a few days later it was announced that Frente! would be performing there on the 31st.

On 3 May 2025, it was announced that The Living End would be performing at the venue on the 7th.

== Bands ==
Some of the bands and artists who have played at the Punters Club include:

- The 5.6.7.8's
- Josh Abrahams
- Alcotomic
- Anaphase
- Arab Strap
- Architecture in Helsinki
- Augie March
- The Avalanches
- Courtney Barnett
- Andrez Bergen
- Black Rose
- The Bo-Weevils
- Blueline Medic
- The Brass Bed
- Breather Hole
- Bughouse
- By Ferry Or Steamer
- The Cannanes
- Cat Power
- The Chalk Circle
- Clowns of Decadence
- The Colonial V-Knees
- Crumpet
- Dallas Crane
- Dan and Al (Dan Warner and Al McInnes)
- Dave Graney and The Coral Snakes
- Dirty Three
- The Disappointments
- DJ Spooky
- The Dumb Earth
- Ephedrine
- Even
- The Fauves
- Fireballs
- Frente!
- Frontside
- The Frying Dutchman
- Gaslight Radio
- Gersey
- The Great Elevator
- Guyver 3
- Honeysmack
- The Happy Sumo
- Hugo Race & The True Spirit
- Isnod
- Jimmy Eat World
- Jon Spencer Blues Explosion
- Kim Salmon, Kim Salmon & The Surrealists
- Little Nobody
- The LN Elektronisch Ensemble
- The Lucksmiths
- Maelstrom
- The Make-Up
- Man in the Wood
- Meloncholiflowers
- Mighty Servant
- Mike Patton
- Minimum Chips
- Mr Floppy
- Negativland
- Ninetynine
- Nitocris
- Ollie Olsen
- The Paradise Motel
- Penthouse Paupers
- Portraits of Hugo Perez
- Powderfinger
- Powder Monkeys
- Pray TV
- Regurgitator
- RPN
- Roaring Jack
- Rocket Science
- The Rococo Pops
- Rowland S. Howard
- Sam Prekop
- Sandpit
- Scanner
- Schlock Tactile
- Sea Scouts
- Sea Stories
- Seven
- Sforzando
- Smudge
- Snout
- Something for Kate
- Soulenoid
- Sick Puppies
- Silverchair
- Son Of Zev
- Spiderbait
- Snog
- Snuff Puppets
- Stu Thomas
- Tee-Art
- Telenova
- Thanks for Coming
- Tiddas
- TISM
- Tlot Tlot
- Two Guys From Kabul
- Underground Lovers
- Various Clan Analogue members
- Voiteck
- Weddings Parties Anything
- Wild Pumpkins at Midnight
- Chris Wilson
- You Am I
- Zen Paradox
