= Bares =

Bares is a surname. Notable people with the surname include:

- Allen Bares (1936–2008), American lawyer and politician
- Ashley Bares (born 1989), American soccer player and coach
- Jeannine Cavender-Bares, American professor
- Peter Bares (1936–2014), German organist and composer
- Raymond H. Bares (1929–1964), American educator and politician

== See also ==
- Barès
- Bareš
- Bare (disambiguation)
- Barer
- Pares (surname)
