= Reaction Hero =

Remix album by Little Nobody + Accomplices
- Released: August 2001
- Genres: Electronic, hip hop, techno
- Length: Double CD – 140 mins.
- Label: IF? Records
- Producer: Andrez Bergen

Little Nobody + Accomplices chronology
Action Hero (2000)	Reaction Hero (2001)	Boastward Ho EP (2001)

Professional ratings
Review scores
Source	Rating
3D World	magazine, 2001

Reaction Hero is a remix double-CD release, sourced from and reinterpreting original tracks on Little Nobody's preceding album Action Hero (2000).

It features new mixes from Little Nobody, as well as from international producers Si Begg, Tal (Sub Rosa), Tobias Schmidt (Tresor), Vocoderman, Brixton, Magnet Toy, and Yamaoka .

The Australian producers involved include Steve Law (Melbourne's Zen Paradox), Digital Primate, Pnau, Sameer Sengupta (Sydney producer Pocket), Schlock Tactile, the LN Elektronische Ensemble, Cinnaman from Adelaide's Dirty House, Isnod, Son Of Zev, Nicole Skeltys (Artificial), 5000 Fingers of Dr. T, Brewster B, Zog, Beam Up (Noodles Discotheque), DJ Tweaka, The Alkaloids, Kandyman, and vocalist Marcella Brassett.

== Critical reception ==
"Take one Little Nobody, a notorious indie electronic label, and a whole lot of remixers and the result is a double-CD of the most eclectic remixes around," wrote Chloe Sasson in her review that appeared in Sydney's 3D World in 2001. "Little Nobody, a.k.a. Andrez Bergen, has been a man around town for years. Beginning his days as electronic music editor for industrial's Dark Angel, Andrez has paid his dues as remixer, editor, journo and all round nice guy. Being such a top cat, Andrez had the idea of inviting established local producers (Son of Zev, 5000 Fingers of Dr T and Nod), convincing overseas big guns (Tobias Schmidt, Si Begg) and extending the chance to a few talented no-names (The Alcoiids) to take their hand at reworking some of his original tracks. The result is a pleasing hodge-podge that travels the electronic train through the sounds of techno, drum and bass and way-out electronica. While the addictive Cocaine Speaking appears as complete remix or tasty sample in many of the 32 tracks featured, the individuality of each producer dominates, producing one of the most interesting and unique remix albums around."

"Fans of a little leftfield electronic indulgence should look no further than this latest release from Melbourne's If? Records and label founder Little Nobody," wrote Dan Stinton, the former editor of Perth's Hype magazine, that same year. "Featuring 2 CDs and some 46 tracks, Reaction Hero follows on from Little Nobody's recent album Action Hero with remixes from some of the world's most respected electronic artists. The release spans twisted hip-hop rhythms, weird breaks and quirky techno featuring names such as Tobias Schmidt, Si Begg and Yamaoka as well as new material from Mr Nobody himself. This is certainly a diverse and difficult listen, but well worth checking out for its innovation and forward thinking sounds."

== Track listing ==
1. "Buffed Up & Then Some" (Little Nobody)
2. "Devolution Maybe? (Tobias Schmidt)"
3. "Cocaine Speaking (Zog)"
4. "Cocaine Speaking (B-Side Me – Pnau)"
5. "Cocaine Speaking (Cinnaman – Dirty House)"
6. "Cocaine Speaking (August – Sameer Sengupta)"
7. "Nobody's Driving (Artificial)"
8. "Cocaine Speaking (Digital Primate)"
9. "Sukiyaki Breaks (Resound – DJ Tweaka)"
10. "Barely Underground (live @ SBS) (LN Elektronische Ensemble)"
11. "Sukiyaki Breaks (Yamaoka)"
12. "Cocaine Speaking (Son Of Zev)"
13. "Sukiyaki Breaks (Voco Derman)"
14. "An Electric Blanket & Minimum Chips (Schlock Tactile)"
15. "Xenophobic Xend Up (Little Nobody)"
16. "The Kinky Kabukist (Magnet Toy)"
17. "Old Skool Gagsta Slap (Someone B.I.G.)"
18. "Nobody's Driving (Little Nobody)"
19. "Action Hero (Tal)"
20. "Light My Fire (live @ SBS) (LN Elektronische Ensemble)"
21. "We Call It Crack House (Little Nobody vs. Someone B.I.G.)"
22. "Bare (Steve Law, feat. Marcella)"
23. "Action Hero (The Alcoiids)"
24. "Bare (Beam Up)"
25. "Bare (The Weirdo – Brewster B)"
26. "The Kinky Kabukist (5000 Fingers Of Dr. T)"
27. "Jack Your Kitsch Up (Little Nobody)"
28. "Jammed Up Dub (Brixton)"
29. "Cocaine Speaking (Tone Float)"
30. "Nobody Plays Guitar (Nod – Isnod)"
31. "Alright Already (Si Begg)"
32. "Bent Brazilian Bender (Curvaceous Crustacean)"

== Personnel ==
- Andrez Bergen – Original Tracks, Composition, Engineering
- Francois Tetaz – Engineering, Mastering
- Jeff Willis – Collaborative Composition + Samples (Cocaine Speaking + Sukiyaki Breaks)
- Marcella Brassett – Vocals (Bare)
- Damian Stephens + Andrez Bergen – Cover art
- Plus: Si Begg, Tal (Sub Rosa), Tobias Schmidt (Tresor), Vocoderman, Brixton, Magnet Toy, Yamaoka, Steve Law (Melbourne's Zen Paradox), Digital Primate, Pnau, Sameer Sengupta (Sydney producer Pocket), Schlock Tactile, the LN Elektronische Ensemble, Cinnaman from Adelaide's Dirty House, Isnod, Son Of Zev, Nicole Skeltys (Artificial), 5000 Fingers of Dr. T, Brewster B, Zog, Beam Up Beaming Productions, DJ Tweaka, The Alcoiids, Kandyman
