= Bare (EP) =

EP by Little Nobody
- Released: August 2000
- Genre: Electronic
- Length: 51 mins.
- Label: IF? Records
- Producer: Andrez Bergen

Little Nobody chronology
Action Hero (2000)	Bare (2000)	Reaction Hero (2001)

Professional ratings
Review scores
Source	Rating
Beat magazine, 2000	

Bare is a remix EP, sourced from Action Hero, the second full-length album from Melbourne's Little Nobody.

It features vocalist Marcella Brassett on the signature track and many of the remixes, and reconsiderations by Little Nobody, the LN Elektronische Ensemble, 8-Bit, Kandyman, Son Of Zev and Isnod. A remix done by DJ Rush was not included.

Bare was adjudged as 'Single of the Week' in Melbourne's Beat magazine by reviewer Andrew Mast.

"Little Nobody sits at the more experimental end of the Melbourne electronic scene, creating a wonderfully intelligent and artful work here," Mast ascribed. "Bare is an imaginative blend of early 20th-century German cabaret, 1980s Australian electro (hear the influences, perhaps, of Ash Wednesday and Ollie Olsen's Orchestra Of Skin & Bone) and today's refreshingly global electronic scene. And amongst the many reinterpretations of the song are 8-Bit's gloriously retro Eurotronica mix (very Telex) and Kandyman's hypnotic and swaggering industro hop restructuring."

== Track listing ==
1. "Original Mix"
2. "Nobody's Singing"
3. "Nod's Naughtynudenavigator Mix"
4. "8-Bit's Interpretation Mix"
5. "Son Of Zev's Barely 13 Mix"
6. "Kandyman's Essential Mix"
7. "LN Elektronische Ensemble Live @ Z-11 Mix"

== Personnel ==
- Andrez Bergen – Samples, Composition, Engineering
- Marcella Brassett – Vocals, Lyrics
- Francois Tetaz – Engineering, Mastering
- 8-Bit, Son Of Zev, Kandyman, Isnod + the LN Elektronische Ensemble – Additional remixes
