= Suiciety =

Australian heavy metal band

- Also known as: Ward 13
- Origin: Melbourne, Australia
- Genres: Heavy metal
- Years active: 1990–1996; 2015–present
- Labels: Shagpile/Shock, Forge
- Past members: Adam Cooper; Doug Dalton; , Cameron McNiven; Karsten Poll; Stefan Poll
- Website: suicietyoz.bandcamp.com

Suiciety are an Australian heavy metal band, which were formed in 1990. They issued two studio albums, Deeper Vision (1993) and Primrose Path (1994) before disbanding in 1996. Suiciety had supported tours by visiting artists, Kreator, Fear Factory, Bolt Thrower, Sepultura and Body Count. The group reformed in 2015 to release new material.

== History ==
Suiciety are a heavy metal band, which formed as Ward 13 in Melbourne in 1990, they changed their name in the following year. The initial line-up was Adam Cooper on lead vocals, Doug Dalton on guitar, Cameron McNiven on drums, Karsten Poll on guitar and Stefan Poll on bass guitar. Dalton was replaced by Ramon Varela on guitar. Suiciety contributed their first recording, "Saddam Hussein", to a Various Artists' compilation album, From Brunswick to Babylon, for the Nomad label. After providing demos, they were signed to Shock's hard rock imprint, Shagpile Records in 1992. Their early performances were at inner city venues, The Tote Hotel and The Punters Club, "where all the misfits and gutter rats would congregate."

Deeper Vision, the group's debut album, was released in July 1993. German-based label Forge issued it later in the same year. Suiciety supported successive tours by visiting artists, Kreator, Fear Factory, Bolt Thrower, Sepultura and Body Count over the next year. "Shades of Grey", a single from the album, was released in June 1994. The band's second album, Primrose Path, was issued in November. Australian musicologist, Ian McFarlane felt it showed, "a greater variety in the music and stronger songs". Also in that year, the group provided a cover version of AC/DC's 1979 track "Night Prowler" for a tribute album, Fuse Box: the Alternative Tribute via BMG. McFarlane noticed it is "a sturdy, thrash-styled rendition". They released a five-track extended play, Cell, in February 1996 before disbanding.

In 2015 Suiciety reformed with Cooper, Karsten Poll and Varela joined by a new rhythm section, to issue another EP, Crawling Machine Edition, in November on Desert Highways. It had been written and recorded in 1996 but was never released. Tex Miller of Forte observed that most of its tracks were "delectable and heavy" providing a "highly sweaty, energetic affair".
