= Club Filter Melbourne =

Coordinates: 37.8123°S 144.9649°E

Club Filter, based upstairs at the Lounge bar and nightclub at 243 Swanston Street in the heart of Melbourne, holds the record as the city's (and also Australia's) longest-running techno music night, having run every Wednesday night from 1992 to 2003.

== Background ==
Run by DJs [Jason] Rudeboy and Mad Rod, the night reflected global styles in techno and club music. Borrowing from the gay scene, they lent towards the obscure and taboo performing arts. The club always regularly had shows and live performances from electro poets to male strippers and drag shows. Early on pursuing a more acid house sound, pre-nascent hardcore techno and drum & bass, then filtering across into the sounds of Detroit, Chicago, New York, Berlin, Cologne, London, Sweden, Scotland, and Melbourne. Filter's sound also cut across record labels as varied as Djax, Force Inc., Tresor, Relief, Axis, Purpose Maker, Sativae, Mosquito, Nova Mute, Valve, Drumcode, Stayupforever, and Pharma.

Dom Phillips, the editor of the UK's Mixmag, visited the club in late 1995 and referred to it in a subsequent article on Melbourne's underground scene thus: "Filter is a wicked club, one of those long-running midweek specials that are, somehow, always cool. ... Some things are international."

Zebra Magazine, the dance/nightclub music insert in Melbourne's Inpress, wrote in 1997 that "Club Filter at the Lounge has virtually established itself as a cultural icon within Melbourne's dance music fraternity." In June 2001 the club celebrated its ninth anniversary with a webcast to a dance music site.

== International and local DJs and live acts ==
International DJs and live acts who played at Filter include Claude Young, Jammin' Unit, Dave Angel, Colin Dale, Rob Gee, Biochip C, Khan Oral (Bizz OD), Ree.K, Stacey Pullen, Lenny Dee, Space Dj'z, Dave the Drummer and Joey Beltram & Authechre.

The club also supported many local live acts and DJs, including Terrence Ho (H2O), Steve Law (Zen Paradox), Voiteck, Honeysmack, Andrez Bergen (Little Nobody), Soulenoid, Guyver 3, Liz Millar, Arthur Arkin, Ollie Olsen, Bwana, Scott Alert, DJ Trooper, Nick Dem Q, Ransom, Cara Caama, Lani G, DJ Ides, Dee Dee, Halo Produkshuns, Slieker, Richie Rich (Richard MacNeill), Zanna Mazzitelli, Andrew Till, Eden, Fiery Eye, Dan Woodman, Derek Shiel, Dom Hogan, Toupee, RSK, Miss Krystal, Graham Mono, Juju Space Jazz, Krang, 8-Bit, Ben Shepherd, Katy K, Matt Sykes, Rob Wu, MBug and Blimp, and most likely the adorable Kate Bathgate

Filter also collaborated regularly with other Melbourne-based labels such as IF? Records, Psy-Harmonics, Smelly Records, and Messy Creations.

The club closed in 2003.

"Earlier this year a blank stare of disbelief swept over Melbourne’s dance community as news spread that after 11 years and nearly 600 consecutive Wednesdays later, the most enduring club in worldwide electronic music – Club Filter - would be closing forever," reported DJ Ides that same year in an online article at Australian music website inthemix.com.au.

Filter was superseded in November 2003 by Jack the Basics, which was operated by another Melbourne techno outfit, the Melbourne Techno Collective. Jack the Basics did not live up to its predecessor and was abandoned in late 2004.

== See also ==
- List of electronic dance music venues
