= Barer =

Barer is a surname. Notable people with the surname include:

- Ariela Barer (born 1998), American actress and singer
- Burl Barer (born 1947), American writer, literary historian, and radio host
- Libe Barer (born 1991), American actress
- Marshall Barer (1923–1998), American musical theatre composer

== See also ==
- Bare (disambiguation)
- Bares
