= Bareš =

Bareš is a surname, and may refer to:

- Igor Bareš (born 1966), Czech actor
- Jakub Bareš (born 1988), Czech curler
- Vojtěch Bareš (born 1974), Czech canoe slalom racer

== See also ==
- Bares
- Barès
