= Ilse Crawford =

British designer

Ilse Crawford CBE RDI
- Born: Ilse Catherine Crawford; 1962 (age 63–64); London, U.K.
- Occupations: Interior and furniture designer
- Notable work: Bedford College, University of London
- Website: www.studioilse.com

Ilse Catherine Crawford CBE RDI (born 1962) is a British interior and furniture designer.

== Early life and education ==
Crawford was born in London in 1962 to Jill Rendall and Malcom Crawford. Her father, Malcom, was the economics editor of The Sunday Times and her mother, Jill, an artist and a pianist. When she was seven years old, Crawford went to live with her grandparents to alleviate the strain on her mother who had recently had triplet daughters.

When Crawford was 18 years old, she had planned to attend University of York but, after her mother died, decided to attend Bedford College to study history.

== Career ==
She worked in an architecture firm and for the Architects' Journal before being chosen as the launch editor of Elle Decoration and then the short-lived Bare magazine. In 1998, she left to work for Donna Karan, soon moving on to designing interiors and setting up her own design studio, StudioIlse, in London in 2001.

In 2000, Crawford founded the Man and Well-Being department at the Design Academy Eindhoven in the Netherlands. In 2003, she established the interiors firm Studio Ilse, which designed the Soho House club in New York, Babington House, the Electric Cinema, and the Hong Kong restaurant Duddell's, as well as pieces for Georg Jensen and IKEA. She worked on the Soho House in collaboration with Harman Jablin Architects. While keeping the exterior and backbones of the 45,000-square-foot building, Crawford worked to redesign the warehouse into a funky club, with 24 hotel rooms, a restaurant, three bars, a private screening room and more. The Soho House was also featured on the television series Sex and the City.

Crawford was profiled in the first season of the Netflix documentary series Abstract: The Art of Design. She was appointed Member of the Order of the British Empire (MBE) in the 2014 New Year Honours and Commander of the Order of the British Empire (CBE) in the 2021 New Year Honours for services to design.

== Books ==
Crawford has published books including:

- Sensual Home: Liberate Your Senses and Change Your Life. Photographed by Martyn Thompson (1997, Quadrille publishing, ISBN 978-1899988174)
- Home is Where the Heart is? Photographed by Martyn Thompson (2009, Quadrille publishing, ISBN 978-1844006052)
- A Frame for Life: The Designs of StudioIlse (2014, Rizzoli International Publications, ISBN 978-0847838578)
