= Pop Tart (album) =

Studio album by Little Nobody
- Released: September 1998
- Genre: Electronic
- Length: 74 mins.
- Label: IF? Records
- Producer: Andrez Bergen

Little Nobody chronology
Solid Gold Collectibles, and Then Some EP (1997)	Pop Tart (1998)	Action Hero (2000)

Professional ratings
Review scores
Source	Rating
3D World	2 November 1998
Juice	Issue 73, 1999
revolver	2 November 1998
Rolling Stone Australia	#55, January 1999

Pop Tart is an album from Little Nobody released on IF? Records in September, 1998.

== Track listing ==
1. "Sparkplug"
2. "Nobody's Driving"
3. "Tobacco-stained Mountain Goat"
4. "Fear of a Black Bat"
5. "Zone Troopers"
6. "We Call It Crack House"
7. "Nobody's Driving (Pharmaceutical Mix)"
8. "Pineapple Slice"
9. "Alright Already!"
10. "Fuyu"
11. "Demented Discotheque"
12. "Old Skool Gangsta Slap"
13. "Goddammit"
14. "Nobody's Driving (Nobody's Looking Mix)"
15. "Nobody's Driving (Houston Mix)"

== Personnel ==
- Andrez Bergen - Samples, Composition, Engineering
- Francois Tetaz - Engineering, Mastering
- Elenor Rayner - Keyboards (Tracks 8 and 13)
- Nicole Skeltys - Remix (Track 7)
- Blimp - Remix (Track 14)
- Dee Dee - Remix (Track 15)
