= Fuse Box (album) =

Fusebox - The Alternative Tribute

Compilation album by Various artists
- Released: 1995
- Recorded: 1995
- Genre: Alternative rock, rock, punk blues rock
- Label: BMG

Fuse Box is an AC/DC tribute album released in Australia in 1995 by BMG. The album compiled a selection of the country's more prominent alternative rock artists from the period. Most of these songs only appear on this album, except Ed Kuepper's "Highway to Hell", which he also recorded for his album A King in the Kindness Room. A live version of "Dirty Deeds Done Dirt Cheap" was included on Nitocris' 1995 "Epic Voyage" EP. The Meanies' version of "It's a Long Way to the Top" was released as a single, with a promotional video featuring the band playing on the back of a truck driving through the Melbourne CBD, an homage to the original clip.

== Track listing ==
1. Anti Anti - "Riff Raff"
2. Front End Loader - "Let Me Put My Love into You"
3. Yothu Yindi - "Jailbreak"
4. Fur - "Ride On"
5. Ed Kuepper - "Highway to Hell"
6. The Meanies - "It's a Long Way to the Top"
7. Regurgitator - "Back in Black"
8. Suiciety - "Nightprowler"
9. Nitocris - "Dirty Deeds Done Dirt Cheap"
10. Downtime - "Walk All Over You"
11. Spiderbait - "Rocker"
12. Don Walker - "There's Gonna Be Some Rockin'"
13. Electric Hippies - "Whole Lotta Rosie"
14. RIG - "Baby, Please Don't Go"
15. Blitz Babiez - "Live Wire"
16. Frenzal Rhomb - "TNT"
17. Automatic - "You Shook Me All Night Long"
- All titles by Angus Young, Malcolm Young and Bon Scott except tracks 2, 7, 17 by Angus Young, Malcolm Young and Brian Johnson and 14 by Big Joe Williams.
