= Sea Stories (band) =

Austrlian indie pop band

- Origin: Melbourne, Australia
- Genres: Indie pop, Indie rock
- Years active: 1986 to 1993
- Labels: Rampant, I.R.S. Records, Polydor
- Spinoffs: Sunglass, Gigantaur
- Past members: Simon Honisett; Penny Hewson; Jeremy Honisett; Robyn Clark; Michael Hepworth; Nick Wilson; Jonathan Williamson

Sea Stories were an Indie pop / Folk rock band from Melbourne, Australia. They existed from 1986 until their break up in 1993. They released 2 full-length albums and a number of EPs and singles.

== History ==
=== 1986-1993: Career ===
Sea Stories were one of a number of promising Melbourne bands that emerged in the late 1980s and early 1990s that also included, amongst others, The Glory Box, Ripe, Helvelln, Autohaze, The Fauves, The Killjoys, The Hollowmen and Pray TV.

The band released the mini album To Light the Home Fires on Rampant Records in 1987 and then followed it up with the 12-inch EP Secret World in 1988.

The band released two albums, Miller's Pond and Wide Eyed and Dreaming in 1990 and 1991 on I.R.S. Records. In 1993 the band released the EP Junior on Polydor.

In March 1993 the band played a month-long residency of Wednesday nights at the Evelyn Hotel in Brunswick Street, Fitzroy. In April, they started another month-long residency of Wednesday nights at the Punters Club Hotel, located across the road from the Evelyn. These dates were announced as being some of their last shows. A final farewell show was held on 14 May at the Central Club Hotel, Richmond.

=== 1994-present: Post break up ===
Simon Honisett and Penny Hewson re-emerged in 1994 as acoustic duo Sunglass. Sunglass issued the album Sunglass in April 1994 and the EP When Stars Collide in June. Sunglass issued a single, "How Long Can You Stay Angry?" in July 1995.

At the same time Honisett and Hewson launched four-piece outfit Gigantaur to cater to their guitar pop tastes, releasing the single "On a Rocket"/"Trailer Trash" and an EP Gigantaur in 1995.

Hewson released her debut solo album Me in 1998 on her own label Wasabi Records. Hewson then relocated to Los Angeles where she played in a short lived band called My Zuko. After living there for a decade, Hewson returned to Melbourne and released her second solo album It's an Endless Desire on Popboomerang Records in August 2012.

== Discography ==
=== Albums ===
Title	Details
To Light the Home Fires	Released: July 1987; Label: Rampant (RR031); Format: Vinyl
Miller's Pond	Released: 1990; Label: I.R.S. Records (IRSD-82036); Format: Vinyl, CD
Wide Eyed and Dreaming	Released: 1991; Label: I.R.S. Records (IRSD-30557); Format: Vinyl, CD

=== Extended plays ===
Title	Details
Secret World	Released: 1988; Label: Rampant Releases (RR047); Format: LP
Junior	Released: June 1992; Label: Polydor (517186-2); Format: CD

=== Singles ===
Year	Title	Album
1990	"Still They Stand"	Miller's Pond
1991	"Gone for Sure"	Wide Eyed and Dreaming
1992	"Wonderful Things"	Wide Eyed and Dreaming
1993	"What Went Wrong"	Junior

== Awards ==
=== ARIA Music Awards ===
The ARIA Music Awards is an annual awards ceremony that recognises excellence, innovation, and achievement across all genres of Australian music. Sea Stories were nominated for one awards.

Year	Nominee / work	Award	Result
1991	Miller's Pond	Best New Talent	Nominated
