= Kynan Robinson =

Australian trombonist and composer

Kynan Robinson is an Australian trombonist and composer. He is most commonly associated with jazz, but also plays other styles.

== Career ==
Robinson was born in Australia but spent his childhood in Bangladesh as a child of Christian missionary parents. They lived there for fifteen years and were the only white people in the village. He returned to Australia to complete high school. He received a bachelor's degree in music from the Victorian College of the Arts which he built on completing a Masters in Composition in 2010. He is a composer and musician.

Robinson formed a contemporary improvisation quintet named En Rusk performing original compositions. The band toured Australia a number of times. They recorded their debut self-titled album 2001 and in 2004 finished their second recording, 1000 Wide. In 2005 he formed The Escalators, which released an album entitled Wrapped in Plastic, compositions and concepts inspired by the films of David Lynch. He also established a reputation in electronic/techno/sample based music. Continuing his recording and touring career mainly with dance/performance ac Des Peres (originally known as Old Des Peres) and second with Hard Hat, a group that brings together electronic and acoustic musicians. Both acts toured Australia and internationally regularly performing at summer festivals around Australia and internationally. Des Peres completed their debut album in 2004. The album was released through Flict/Shock. Their second album Ace Doubt was released in 2006 through Flit/MGM. Des Peres combines a theatrical stage approach with a sample-heavy sound. While playing with the band, Robinson adopts the name Old Des and works very with Luva DJ (Michelle Robinson) and Mr. Ection (visual artist and brother Kiron Robinson) as well as guitarist Tom Bass and Kelsey James. Their third album was entitled The Adventures of Cowboy and Miniman.

In 2010 he formed Australian Jazz band Collider with Melbourne saxophonist Adam Simmons. Combining a traditional jazz ensemble with orchestral and improvising string players, "Solo in Red" was a large form composition composed by Robinson, performed by Collider and commissioned by the Melbourne Writers Festival. Its thematic material was drawn from the writings of American novelist Cormac McCarthy.

Beyond just music the completed work also involved a highly technical and moving video work, a lighting design and narration with excerpts from the book narrated on stage. Solo in Red was released as an album at the same time the band also released a second album, titled "Words". When working on the music for "Words" he returned a third time to his technique of using literary figures and texts.

Robinson has toured and recorded with C.W. Stoneking, Brian Brown, and the Melbourne Ska Orchestra, Miss Yugoslavia and the Bare Foot Orchestra, The Adam Simmons Toy Band, BucketRider, and Peter Knight's 5+2 Brass Ensemble. He is also featured on the Australian TV Series Miss Fischer's Murder Mysteries produced by the ABC. He has composed music for jazz ensembles, dance productions, musical theatre, contemporary classical ensembles, and electronic dance acts and has had his compositions performed in festivals around the world. In 2001 he was a collaborative composer for Double Venturi, a collaborative piece involving musicians and funded by Arts Victoria. In 2004 he received funding through the Australia Council to compose a concert-length work for prepared piano and small ensemble that was premiered at the Wangaratta Festival of Jazz. He also has scored the music to six short films and has collaborated in numerous cross arts projects with visual artists including Kiron Robinson, Narinda Reevers, and Dave Macleod. Robinson has won three ARIA awards. In 2014 he was recognised and awarded with the ICTEV/DLTV Educational Leader of the Year Award.

== Contribution to the Field of Education ==
=== Research in Complexity, Creativity, and Identity ===
Beyond his career in music, Kynan Robinson is widely recognised as one of Australia's leading voices in systemic educational transformation. His doctoral research, Enabling Collective Creativity in Schools using Minecraft: Serious Play, positioned learning and education through the lens of complexity theory and has become a foundational reference in discussions of contemporary Western education reform.

Robinson’s thesis introduced an original approach to research methodology and educational design, integrating creative practice, narrative, and theoretical disruption. The work is notable not only for its innovative form but for its substantial theoretical contribution. Dr. Dennis Sumara, a prominent scholar in complexity thinking and education, described Robinson’s dissertation as:

The dissertation has been described as challenging conventional genre, form, and the methods used by educational researchers, and as being creative and disruptive in certain respects.

Rooted in complexity theory, Robinson's research re-conceptualised creativity within Australian mainstream education—not as an individual trait but as an emergent property arising from collective, adaptive systems. His thesis critically examined the structural, cultural, and pedagogical conditions of the Australian education system that enable or hinder creativity. Minecraft served as the key pedagogical medium, allowing students to collaboratively reimagine their learning context.

This research was part of the Australian Research Council-funded linkage project Serious Play: Using Digital Games in School to Promote Literacy and Learning in the 21st Century (LP110200309).

The study engaged 136 students and five teachers in a 10-week immersive project based in a fictional planetary world—Aurora 56Z—constructed within Minecraft. This world served as both a narrative setting and a data-generating space, giving rise to a unique form of experiential learning and identity exploration.

Robinson’s findings highlighted the limitations of existing pedagogical models and championed the potential of digital games and complexity-based learning to catalyse systemic creativity. He introduced a new form of identity observed in the students, which he called Vellooming—a multithreaded, fluid identity in constant emergence.

He wrote:

"I immersed myself in the world of the students, teachers, and school as I wrote this thesis... In the process of analysing the server data, I wrote a novel, set on Aurora 56Z, casting the young people as the characters and the 'ruins' of the server as the setting... This immersion... helped me to understand more deeply the creative learning process."

By employing unconventional methodologies—including Minecraft servers and student-created Wikis—Robinson expanded the field of post-qualitative research. His thesis offered:

Evidence that pedagogies grounded in complexity are marginalised in mainstream discourse.

Validation for approaches that exist at the intersection of conflicting educational paradigms.

A case for the legitimacy of digital games as systems for cultivating collective creativity.

The identification of emergent, fluid identities among learners—named Vellooming identities.

=== A Vellooming Identity ===
Robinson coined the term Vellooming Identity to describe a new form of identity formation observed in children navigating digital worlds. He defines it as:

"...in a state of constant shifting, never still, and constantly emerging... a form of transportation, movement, and exploration across time, space, and structures."

The concept draws on poststructuralist theory, echoing Deleuze’s ideas of nomadic thought and the rhizome, and aligns with Foucault’s critique of the self as a fixed construct. However, Robinson extends these ideas by connecting Vellooming to the digital, networked world—where identity is not anchored to time but instead oriented toward continual becoming.

His work challenges dominant, reductionist models of creativity that define it as an individual trait measurable by standardised metrics. In contrast, Robinson reframes creativity as a collective, emergent process—inseparable from the dynamic environments and systems in which it unfolds.

Through his doctoral research and subsequent publications, Robinson calls for a redefinition of both learning and creativity. He offers a new lexicon and methodology for understanding the adaptive, collaborative, and evolving identities of learners in the 21st century.

In doing so, he has made a lasting contribution to the fields of educational philosophy, research methodology, and pedagogical design.

== Discography ==
=== As leader ===
- En Rusk (Newmarket Music) 2001
- 1000 Wide (Newmarket Music) 2003
- Old Des Peres – Preserved (Flict/Shock) 2004
- Des Peres – Ace Doubt (Flict/MGM)2006
- Des Peres – The Adventures of Cowboy and Miniman (House of Pow/Amphead)2008
- The Escalators – Wrapped in Plastic (Jazz Head)
- Collider – Words (House of Pow)
- Collider – Solo In Red (House of Pow)

=== As sideman ===
- Adam Simmons Toy Band – Happy Jacket
- Melbourne Acid Techno (Dark Matter Records)
- Sample Synthesis 4 and 5 (Clan Analogue Records)
- Paul Colman Trio – Turn (Control Records)
- Matt Fagan
- Malone – This is it (Cavalier Music)
- The Mavis's – Throwing Little Stones (FMR)
- City City City (Remote Control Records)
- Skazz of Melbourne
- 5+2 Ensemble – Invisible Cities and other Works (Rufus)
- C.W. Stoneking – Jungle Blues
- Melbourne Ska Orchestra

=== Remixes ===
- Machine Translations (Spunk)

== Film scores ==
- The Only Person in the World – Ben Chessell
- 3 Weeks in Koh Samui - Alistair Reid
- From The Top – Alistair Reid
- Is God a DJ – Ben Chessell

== Installations ==
- Double Venturi – Collaborative composition with Garth Paine 2001
- The Slow Burn – Collaborative composition with Erik Griswold 2004

== Grants and awards ==
- Australia Council Promotion and Presentation (En Rusk Recording) 2004
- Australia Council New Works 2005
- Arts Victoria Music for the Future Recording (Des Peres) 2005
- Arts Victoria Music For The Future Touring (Des Peres) 2005
- D.C.I.T.A. Touring (Des Peres) 2005
