= Action Hero (album) =

Studio album by Little Nobody
- Released: July 2000
- Genre: Electronic
- Length: 73 minutes
- Label: IF? Records
- Producer: Andrez Bergen

Little Nobody chronology
Pop Tart (1998)	Action Hero (2000)	Bare (2000)

Action Hero is the second full-length album from Melbourne's Little Nobody. This album was released on IF? Records in July, 2000 in Australia.

== Artwork ==
The photography and artwork were designed by R. Klemczak.

== Reception ==
Professional ratings
Review scores
Source	Rating
The Age	3.5/5 stars
The Weekend Australian	3/5 stars
3D World	4/5 stars
Hype Magazine	(positive)

"It's full of fascinating manic spirit, a refusal to simply settle down and be normal, which is, of course, brilliant. The jacking, snarly house tracks are wild. 'Apocoloppola', a lysergic, obsessive collage of film dialogue and weirdness, is stunning. And the hip hop tracks are unforgettable." Chris Johnston in The Age newspaper in 2001, writing about Action Hero.

"Sample-heavy Australian record that if we were being terribly lazy we might describe as 'a bit like a more left field Avalanches, only better'. Generally quite old skool industrial in sound, this periodically throws some incongruous acid/filter house party shapes, which is a bit like Gordon Brown breaking off from talking about monetary policy to dance the can-can. And we all know how great that is." Duncan Bell, reviewing the same album for Muzik magazine in the UK, in 2001.

"A playful sensibility prevails in the music - the 15 tracks here oscillating between wall-of-sound big beat ('Nobody Plays Guitar') and an abrasive minimalism ('Track 28') reminiscent of Autechre, between dubby ambience and classic acid house. This sonic catholicism can occasionally prove distracting but, in Bergen's defence, he takes a rough-hewn approach to the collision (and collusion) of sounds that prevents this collection from lapsing into the merely tasteful or clever." Shane Donaldson, reviewing the album for The Weekend Australian newspaper, in 2001.

== Track listing ==
1. "Apocoloppola"
2. "HPF Sourced"
3. "Bare (feat. Marcella)"
4. "Devolution Maybe?"
5. "IF? Is Good (live)"
6. "Track 28"
7. "Tantalizing Tarantula"
8. "Alright Already (Enough Is Enough Mix)"
9. "Cocaine Speaking (Little Nobody's Mind-Bending Remix)"
10. "Jack Your Kitsch Up"
11. "A Zed & Two Rorts (live)"
12. "Acid Hoe-Down"
13. "Nobody Plays Guitar"
14. "The Kinky Kabukist"
15. "Profondo Rosso Finito"

== Personnel ==
- Andrez Bergen – Samples, Composition, Engineering
- Francois Tetaz – Engineering, Mastering
- Jeff Willis – Composition + Samples (Tracks 2, 9 + 13)
- Marcella Brassett – Vocals (Track 3)
- Elenor Rayner – Keyboards + Samples (Tracks 6, 7 + 12)
- Honeysmack + Biz-E + High Pass Filter – Additional samples
