= Des Peres (band) =

Australian electronic indie/dance band

- Also known as: Old Des Peres
- Origin: Australia
- Genres: Electronic indie/dance
- Years active: 2000–present
- Website: https://desperes.bandcamp.com/

Des Peres is an Australian electronic indie/dance band, formed in 2000 and originally known as Old Des Peres.

Formed by Melbourne composer and jazz musician Kynan Robinson, its original incarnation was of a fairly heavy solo techno act. Upon introduction of Michelle Robinson to the band, who took on the character Luva DJ, and visual artist Kiron Robinson (Mr Ection) the band stayed working in the dance scene while always heavily parodying the same scene and genre. As the band's popularity increased its sound started to develop and it moved away from the world of dance music and began performing in venues more traditionally linked with indie or rock acts. During this period the band also had an association with Electronic Arts Collective Clan Analogue.

Beyond the music the bands commitment to a performance style that embraced the avant-garde and techno-surrealism resulted in them rejecting the conservative dance club scene. In doing so they were a pioneer of musical acts that chose to 'cross-genre".

Luva DJ, Mr Ection and Old Des started performing with definite characters in mind. At one stage the band used a concert to reenact entire soap opera scripts that they had written; on another occasion the band sailed out of a concert in a boat that had been made for them as they had the crowd singing:

"As we sail across the ocean
there's a certain kinda motion
then D.P came along and saved my life"

The band's first album, Preserved was released on Shock Records and still showed strong links to the electronic sound that had been the band's genesis while also containing numerous floating vocals and the heavy preaching style devised by Mr. Ection. The release of the album in Australia was considered a breakthrough for Australian bands and the uniqueness of the album garnered the band huge radio support and saw them touring endlessly.

The Australian press contained positive reviews of genre-hopping style of the band and their live show. In 2006 Des Peres released its second album, Ace Doubt (Flict/MGM) which has moved even further from the electronic sounds and has moved further down the sample heavy sounds similar to artists like Kid Koala, DJ Shadow and RJD2.
