= B(if)tek =

Australian electronic music duo

- Origin: Canberra, Australia
- Genre: Electronica
- Years active: 1996–2003
- Label: Murmur/Sony
- Members: Kate Crawford; Nicole Skeltys
- Website: www.biftek.com

B(if)tek was an Australian electronic music duo comprising Kate Crawford and Nicole Skeltys, which formed in Canberra in 1994. They released three albums, Sub-Vocal Theme Park (1996), 2020 (2000) and Frequencies Will Move Together (2003) before disbanding in 2003. At the ARIA Music Awards of 1999, B(if)tek were nominated for Best Dance Release for the track "Bedrock", which appeared on their second album. The group also composed the soundtrack for a four-minute film in the Kspace exhibition at the National Museum of Australia in Canberra.

== History ==
=== 1994–2003: B(if)tek ===
In 1993 in Canberra, Kate Crawford and Nicole Skeltys formed B(if)tek as an electronic music group, and began writing material for their first album, Sub-Vocal Theme Park (1996). Biftek comes from French le biftek, which is borrowed from the English "beefsteak", while the English "beef" is originally from the French le bœuf. It was sourced from Jean-Luc Goddard's 1961 film Une femme est une femme. According to the band's website, the album was recorded by the duo during 1995 and 1996 in a local suburban garage and was released as a limited edition of 500 copies on the independent Geekgirl label.

Blatant Propaganda's reviewer felt that Sub-Vocal Theme Park showed "a range of cruisey analogue-synth based tracks... Trippy listening music, with lots of burbling bass, mellow grooves, occasional samples, and spluttering filtered percussions." B(if)tek had a close association with the Clan Analogue collective.

By 2000, the duo were based in Melbourne. They had signed with the Murmur label, distributed by Sony Music Australia.

For their 2003 album, Frequencies Will Move Together, the band received a grant from the federal government to investigate the effects of low-frequency sounds on people.

=== 2004–present: After break-up ===
After the split, Nicole Skeltys changed musical direction, forming the psychedelic folk band Dust and releasing the album Songs in 2007. In late 2007, she formed the band The Jilted Brides and released the album Larceny of Love. Since 2008, she has been based in Pittsburgh, Pennsylvania.

In 2006, Kate Crawford began hosting experimental music television show Set on the Australian Broadcasting Corporation. She is also an author and academic and lives and works in Sydney.

In 2018, Kate Crawford, as one half of a duo named Metric Systems, released an album on Best Effort Records, named People in the Dark. Metric Systems is a collaboration with Bo Daley of Dark Network. The eight songs that make up People in the Dark were recorded in studios across Sydney, Melbourne, Berlin, and New York over sixteen years. The album draws from a large archive of recordings that move between minimal techno, modular downtempo, and more abstract electroacoustic experimentation.

== Discography ==
=== Studio albums ===
List of studio albums, with selected chart positions and certifications
Title	Album details	Peak chart positions
Title	Album details	AUS
Sub-Vocal Theme Park (Acid Unravelled)	Released: 1996; Label: B(if)tek; Formats: CD (500 copies)	-
2020	Released: August 2000; Label: Murmur (MATTCD105); Formats: CD, 2×LP	60
Frequencies Will Move Together	Released: 2003; Label: Inertia Recordings (SUBVOX001CD); Formats: 2×CD	-

=== Singles ===
Year	Title	Peak chart positions	Album
Year	Title	AUS	Album
1998	"Bedrock "	—	2020
1999	"We Think You're Dishy"	—	2020
2000	"Machines Work"	—	2020
2000	Wired for Sound (feat. Julee Cruise)	88	2020

== Awards ==
=== ARIA Music Awards ===
The ARIA Music Awards is an annual awards ceremony that recognises excellence, innovation, and achievement across all genres of Australian music. They commenced in 1987. B(if)tek were nominated for one award.

Year	Nominee / work	Award	Result
1999	"Bedrock"	Best Dance Release	Nominated
