= Bare Island =

Bare Island may refer to:

- Bare Island (Massachusetts)
- Bare Island (New South Wales)
- Bare Island, New Zealand
