= Bare (magazine) =

Defunct British magazine

Bare was a British magazine developed and launched as a wellbeing brand by the John Brown Media company It was published from Sept/Oct 2000 to August 2001, with six issues per year. An early version of the magazine, then called Well was tested in market research groups in 1999 where Claudia Zeff, then art director of UK Gardens Illustrated commissioned designer, Kirsten Willey to produce a wellbeing magazine concept. It was Zeff who suggested the name change from Well to Bare after watching a BBC documentary about British architect, John Pawson.

In March 2000, Ilse Crawford – founder editor of British ELLE Decoration - was invited as editor of Bare for a summer launch. At this time the publication was a bimonthly magazine available on news-stands internationally. The advertising department led by publisher, Honor Riley, formerly of Condé Nast, secured a world first with Chanel advertising in the launch issue. Partnerships were garnered with Harvey Nichols and other brands with synergy. The magazine was popular amongst the design aficionado in Belgium and a copy of the Helena Christensen edition made an appearance on the Sex And The City episode, Time and Punishment.

The magazine has been described as "speak[ing] the earnest psychobabble of the Hampstead eco-hypochondriac".
