= Bare, Konjic =

Bare Баре
- Village
- Location within Bosnia and Herzegovina
- Coordinates: 43°38′10″N 17°56′12″E
- Country: Bosnia and Herzegovina
- Entity: Federation of Bosnia and Herzegovina
- Canton: Herzegovina-Neretva
- Municipality: Konjic

Area
  - Total: 1.47 sq mi (3.81 km^{2})

Population (2013)
  - Total: 28
  - Density: 19/sq mi (7.3/km^{2})
- Time zone: UTC+1 (CET)
  - Summer (DST): UTC+2 (CEST)

Bare (Cyrillic: Баре) is a village in the municipality of Konjic, Bosnia and Herzegovina.

== Demographics ==
According to the 2013 census, its population was 28.

Ethnicity in 2013
Ethnicity	Number	Percentage
Croats	19	67.9%
Bosniaks	9	32.1%
Serbs	0	0.0%
other/undeclared	0	0.0%
Total	28	100%
