= Bare (Goražde) =

- Village
- Location within Bosnia and Herzegovina
- Coordinates: 43°38′35″N 18°55′26″E
- Country: Bosnia and Herzegovina
- Entity: Federation of Bosnia and Herzegovina
- Canton: Bosnian-Podrinje Goražde
- Municipality: Goražde

Area
  - Total: 0.64 sq mi (1.65 km^{2})

Population (2013)
  - Total: 8
  - Density: 13/sq mi (4.8/km^{2})
- Time zone: UTC+1 (CET)
  - Summer (DST): UTC+2 (CEST)

Bare is a village in the municipality of Goražde, Bosnia and Herzegovina.

== Demographics ==
According to the 2013 census, its population was 8, all Bosniaks.
