= Jeannine Cavender-Bares =

American ecologist

- Born: United States
- Occupation: Professor

Academic background
- Education: BA (Cornell University); MES (Yale University); PhD (Harvard University)

Jeannine Cavender-Bares is Professor of Organismic and Evolutionary Biology at Harvard University and Director of the Harvard University Herbaria. She is a chair of the Harvard University Biodiversity and Planetary Stewardship initiative (HUBS), and of the Harvard Forest Leadership Committee, and serves on the Board of Tutors of the Environmental Science and Public Policy Concentration. She is also adjunct professor in the Department of Ecology, Evolution & Behavior at the University of Minnesota, where she served on the faculty for over two decades. Her research integrates evolutionary biology, ecology, and physiology by studying the functional traits of plants, with a particular focus on oaks.

== Early life and education ==
Cavender-Bares grew up in Athens, Ohio. She received her B.A. in environmental sciences from Cornell University in 1990, her Masters in forestry and global change from Yale University in 1992 and her PhD from Harvard University in 2000. At Harvard, Jeannine worked with Fakhri A. Bazzaz and studied the physiological and evolutionary ecology of oaks (Quercus). She then worked as a postdoctoral research fellow at the Smithsonian Environmental Research Center with Catherine Lovelock and at the French National Centre for Scientific Research in Montpellier with Serge Rambal and Richard Joffre.

== Career and research ==
She is a prominent evolutionary ecologist whose research integrates ecosystem ecology, plant physiology, community assembly and phylogenetics, and a pioneer in the emerging field of "spectral biology"—the use of spectroscopy and remote sensing to gain insight into biological processes. Her research group uses concepts from the evolutionary history of plant physiology to understand how ecosystems function in the face of global climate change, as well as how changes in biodiversity and ecosystem function can be remotely sensed. She led the design and establishment of several long-term experiments, including in Costa Rica within the Area Conservación Guanacaste, at Cedar Creek Ecosystem Science Reserve, and at the Harvard Forest. These include the Forest and Biodiversity (FAB) experiments and the Adaptation to Climate and Environment (ACE) experiments. Her work on oaks as a model clade has emphasized the role of diversification in community assembly.

Since 2020, Cavender-Bares has directed the NSF-funded biology integration institute ASCEND, which uses spectral biology and predictive models to study biodiversity and global change. She was lead principal investigator of the NSF/NASA Dimensions of biodiversity project "Linking remotely sensed optical diversity to genetic, phylogenetic and functional diversity to predict ecosystem processes" and lead editor for the open access book Remote Sensing of Plant Biodiversity. In 2025, she and her team launched the International Herbarium Spectral Digitization Working Group, IHerbSpec to advance a shared vision for using common protocols and metadata standards as well as transparent, collaborative practices.

She has contributed to national and international efforts to assess and monitor biodiversity. She was one of the coordinating lead authors of the Intergovernmental Science-Policy Platform on Biodiversity and Ecosystem Services (IPBES) report for the Americas and is an author on the IPBES second global assessment. The IPBES is an independent intergovernmental body supported by multiple nations with the mission to "strengthen the science-policy interface for biodiversity and ecosystem services for the conservation and sustainable use of biodiversity, long-term human well-being and sustainable development." She served on the NASA Working Group that authored the 2022 NASA Biological Diversity and Ecological Forecasting Report: Current State of Knowledge and Considerations for the Next Decade. In 2016, she helped launch the Oaks of the Americas Conservation Network, which promotes the protection of oak species across North America.

She served on the Governing Board of the Ecological Society of America from 2020-2026 and has been a member of the Steering Committee of the World Biodiversity Forum since 2020. She was appointed to serve on the public facing Biological Sciences Advisory Committee (BIO AC) to the National Science Foundation (NSF) from 2019 to 2021, and served on the Advisory Board of the National Evolutionary Synthesis Center (NESCent). She is an Editor for New Phytologist and Editor-in-Chief of Harvard Papers in Botany.

Cavender-Bares is an elected member of the American Academy of Arts and Sciences. and a fellow of the American Association for the Advancement of Science. She was a Fulbright Scholar to Germany and later to Mexico, a Chateaubriand Fellow to France, and a fellow of the Leopold Environmental Leadership Program.

== Publications ==
As of 2026, Cavender-Bares has published over 250 peer-reviewed journal articles, international assessments or book chapters that have been cited over 50,000 times.

Some of her most important papers as first author include:

- J Cavender-Bares, DM White, NI Ahlstrand, MW Austin, D Bastianelli, S Bazan, et al. (2025), Next-generation specimen digitization: capturing reflectance spectra from the world's herbaria for modeling plant biology across time, space, and taxa. New Phytol. https://doi.org/10.1111/nph.70645
- J Cavender-Bares, JE Meireles, J Pinto-Ledezma, PB Reich, MC Schuman, PA Townsend, and A Trowbridge (2025). Spectral biology across scales in changing environments. Ecology 106(7): e70078. https://doi.org/10.1002/ecy.70078
- J Cavender-Bares, FD Schneider, JM Santos, et al. (2022). Integrating remote sensing with ecology and evolution to advance biodiversity conservation. Nat Ecol Evol 6, 506–519.
- J Cavender-Bares (2019), Diversification, adaptation, and community assembly of the American oaks (Quercus), a model clade for integrating ecology and evolution. New Phytol, 221, 669–692.
- J Cavender-Bares, JA Gamon, SE Hobbie, MD Madritch, JE Meireles et al. (2017) Harnessing plant spectra to integrate the biodiversity sciences across biological and spatial scales. American Journal of Botany 104 (7), 1–4.
- J Cavender-Bares, D Ackerly, S Hobbie, P Townsend (2016) Evolutionary legacy effects on ecosystems: Biogeographic origins, plant traits, and implications for management in the era of global change. Annual Review of Ecology, Evolution, and Systematics 47, 433–62
- J Cavender-Bares, S Polasky, E King, and P Balvanera (2015). A sustainability framework for assessing trade-offs in ecosystem services. Ecology and Society 20, no. 1.
- J Cavender-Bares, A González-Rodríguez, D Eaton, A Hipp, A Beulke, P Manos (2015). Phylogeny and biogeography of the American live oaks (Quercus subsection Virentes): a genomic and population genetics approach. Mol Ecol, 24, 3668–3687.
- J Cavender-Bares, PB Reich (2012) Shocks to the system: community assembly of the oak savanna in a 40‐year fire frequency experiment. Ecology 93 (sp8), S52-S69.
- J Cavender-Bares, KH Kozak, PVA Fine, SW Kembel (2009). The merging of community ecology and phylogenetic biology. Ecology Letters 12 (7), 693–715.
- J Cavender-Bares, A Keen, B Miles (2006). Phylogenetic structure of Floridian plant communities depends on taxonomic and spatial scale. Ecology 87 (sp7), S109-S122.
- J Cavender-Bares, DD Ackerly, DA Baum, FA Bazzaz (2004). Phylogenetic overdispersion in Floridian oak communities. The American Naturalist 163 (6), 823–843.
- J Cavender-Bares, K Kitajima, FA Bazzaz (2004). Multiple trait associations in relation to habitat differentiation among 17 Floridian oak species. Ecological Monographs 74 (4), 635–662.
- J Cavender-Bares, FA Bazzaz (2000). Changes in drought response strategies with ontogeny in Quercus rubra: implications for scaling from seedlings to mature tree s. Oecologia 124 (1), 8–18.
