= Peter Bares =

German organist and composer

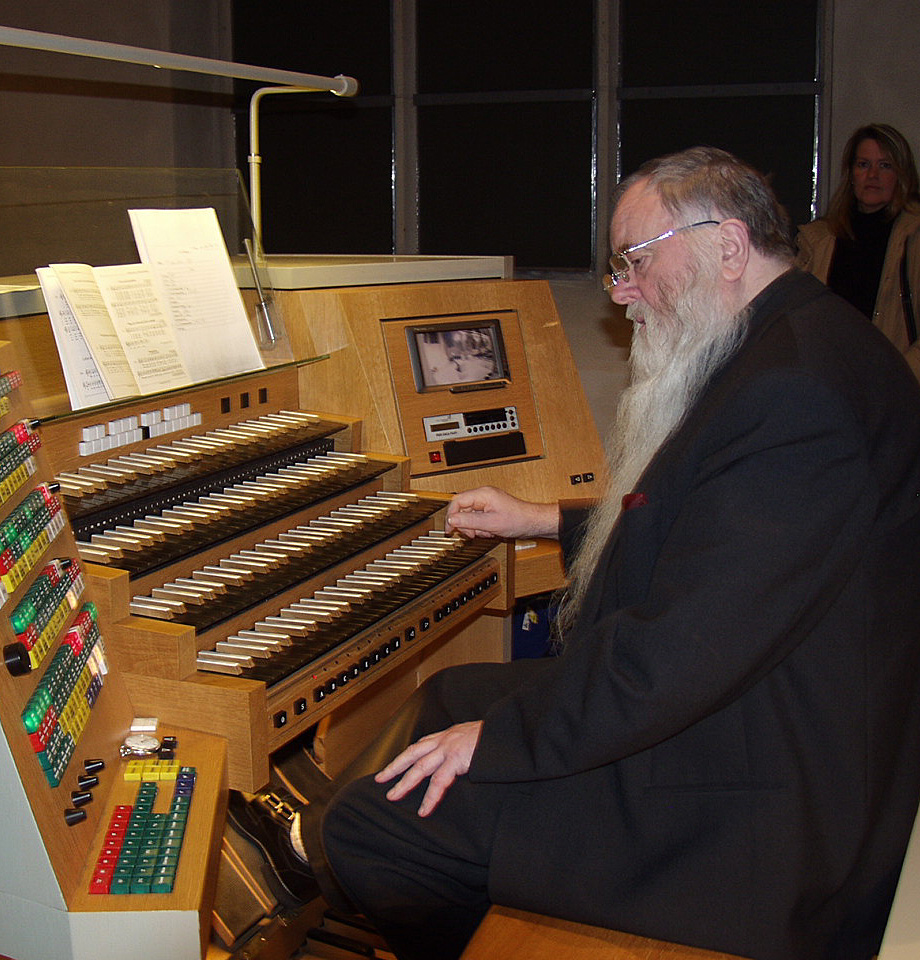
Peter Bares on 15 January 2006.

Peter Bares (16 January 1936 – 2 March 2014) was a German organist and composer. He was best known for his church music. He was born in Essen.

Bares died on 2 March 2014 in Rhineland-Palatinate. He was 78 years old.
