= Bare (Kraljevo) =

Coordinates: 43°26′N 20°40′E

Bare Баре (Serbian)
- Village (Selo)
- Interactive map of Bare
- Country: Serbia
- District: Raška District
- Municipality: Kraljevo

Population (2002)
  - Total: 165
- Time zone: UTC+1 (CET)
  - Summer (DST): UTC+2 (CEST)

Bare is a village in the municipality of Kraljevo, western-central Serbia. According to the 2002 census, the village has a population of 165 people.
