= Barès =

Barès is a surname, and may refer to:

- Gabriel Barès (born 2000), Swiss footballer
- Joseph Barès (1872–1954), French military aviation leader
- Louis Barès (born 1930), French cyclist

== See also ==
- Bares
