= Bare (Rekovac) =

- Village
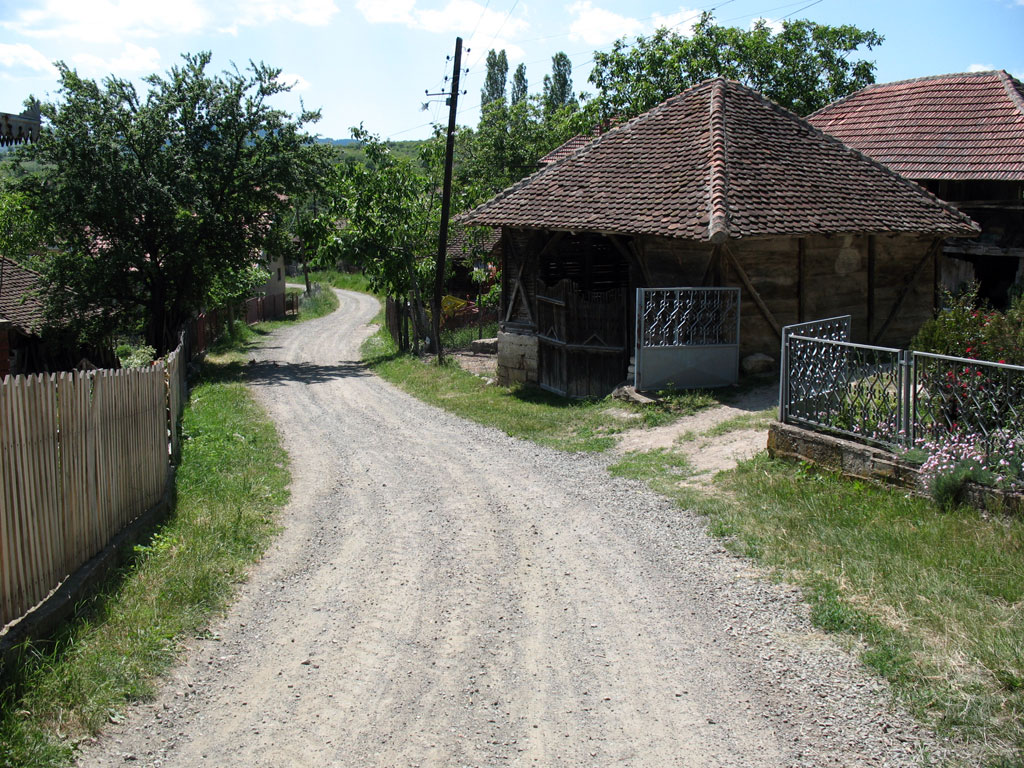

- Location within Serbia
- Coordinates: 43°49′33″N 21°03′23″E
- Country: Serbia
- District: Pomoravlje District
- Municipality: Rekovac

Population (2002)
  - Total: 77
- Time zone: UTC+1 (CET)
  - Summer (DST): UTC+2 (CEST)

Bare is a village in the municipality of Rekovac, Serbia. According to the 2002 census, the village has a population of 77 people.

A Bronze Age grave of a prominent man with rich jewelry of gold was unveiled under a mound in the village.
