= Bare Butte =

Mountain in Texas, United States

Coordinates: 33°53′05.9″N 98°38′25.6″W

Bare Butte is a summit in Wichita County, Texas, in the United States. With an elevation of 1,056 feet (322 m), Bare Butte is the 1529th highest summit in the state of Texas.

Bare Butte was named for one Mr. Barre, an early settler and prospector.
