= Bare, Šavnik =

Bare Баре
- Town
- Location within Montenegro
- Country: Montenegro
- Region: Northern
- Municipality: Šavnik

Population (2011)
  - Total: 250
- Time zone: UTC+1 (CET)
  - Summer (DST): UTC+2 (CEST)

Bare (Montenegrin: Баре) is a small town in the municipality of Šavnik, Montenegro.

== Demographics ==
According to the 2003 census, the town has a population of 301 people.

According to the 2011 census, its population was 250.

Ethnicity in 2011
Ethnicity	Number	Percentage
Serbs	157	62.8%
Montenegrins	92	36.8%
other/undeclared	1	0.4%
Total	250	100%
