= Martyn Thompson =

Martyn Thompson is a photographer, based in New York City. He specializes in still life, interior, beauty, accessory, fashion, and travel photography.

== Career ==
Martyn Thompson was born in England but grew up in Sydney, Australia. He graduated school in 1982 and moved to New York City. Thompson started to paint fabrics, turn them into skirts, and finally sell them at a boutique. As he began to take photographs of his designs, he became interested in photography.

== Style ==
According to his website, his work “contains a strong documentary element, drawing the viewer into a scene in a way that raises intriguing and often enigmatic questions about what has just happened. Though his pictures are clearly shaped by an acute sense of visual history, they retain a strong contemporary identity. His images have been described as embodying the essence of tactile realism, while at the same time they possess a painterly quality.”

Martyn Thompson is described by Catharine Lumby of Graphis Publishing as specializing in “subtle variations in color and is capable of achieving visual balance in an apparently random composition.”

== Career ==
Some of Martyn Thompson's editorial clients include Vanity Fair, Men's Vogue, British Vogue, W Magazine, House & Garden, Gourmet, Travel + Leisure, City Magazine, and The New York Times Magazine, among others.

His advertising clients include Tiffany & Co., Gucci, Ralph Lauren, Hermès, American Express, Sony, Grey Goose, Cole Haan, Estee Lauder, and MAC Cosmetics.

Martyn Thompson is one of the founders of “the Tree” - a multi disciplinary art collective in New York City.

== Published work ==
- Concrete
- Home is Where the Heart Is written by Ilse Crawford, photographed by Martyn Thompson; Rizzoli April 2005; ISBN 978-0-8478-2685-8
- Sensual Home written by Ilse Crawford, photographed by Martyn Thompson; Kyle Cathie September 2000; ISBN 978-1-902757-61-2
- Wild at Heart written by Nikki Tibbles, photographed by Martyn Thompson; Octopus Publishing Group September 2001; ISBN 978-1-84091-130-5
- The River Café Cook Book Series written by Rose Gray and Ruth Rogers; Ebury Press 2008; ISBN 978-0-09-192532-1
