= Nitocris (band) =

Australian rock band

- Origin: Sydney, New South Wales, Australia
- Genres: Heavy metal, punk rock
- Years active: 1992–2001
- Labels: Phantom, Black Yak, Shock
- Past members: Sara Anderson; Jessamine Finlayson; Andrea Stanway; Kira Taylor; Morgana Ancone
- Website: www.nitocris.com

Nitocris were an Australian punk and heavy metal band formed in 1992. They were one of the country's first all-female punk rockers of the "grot grrrls" movement (related to the United States riot grrrls). They released their debut album, Screaming Dolorous on Phantom Records in 1994. Their second album, Nitocris, followed in 2000 and they disbanded in November 2001. At the ARIA Music Awards of 2001, Nitocris were nominated for Best Independent Release.

== History ==
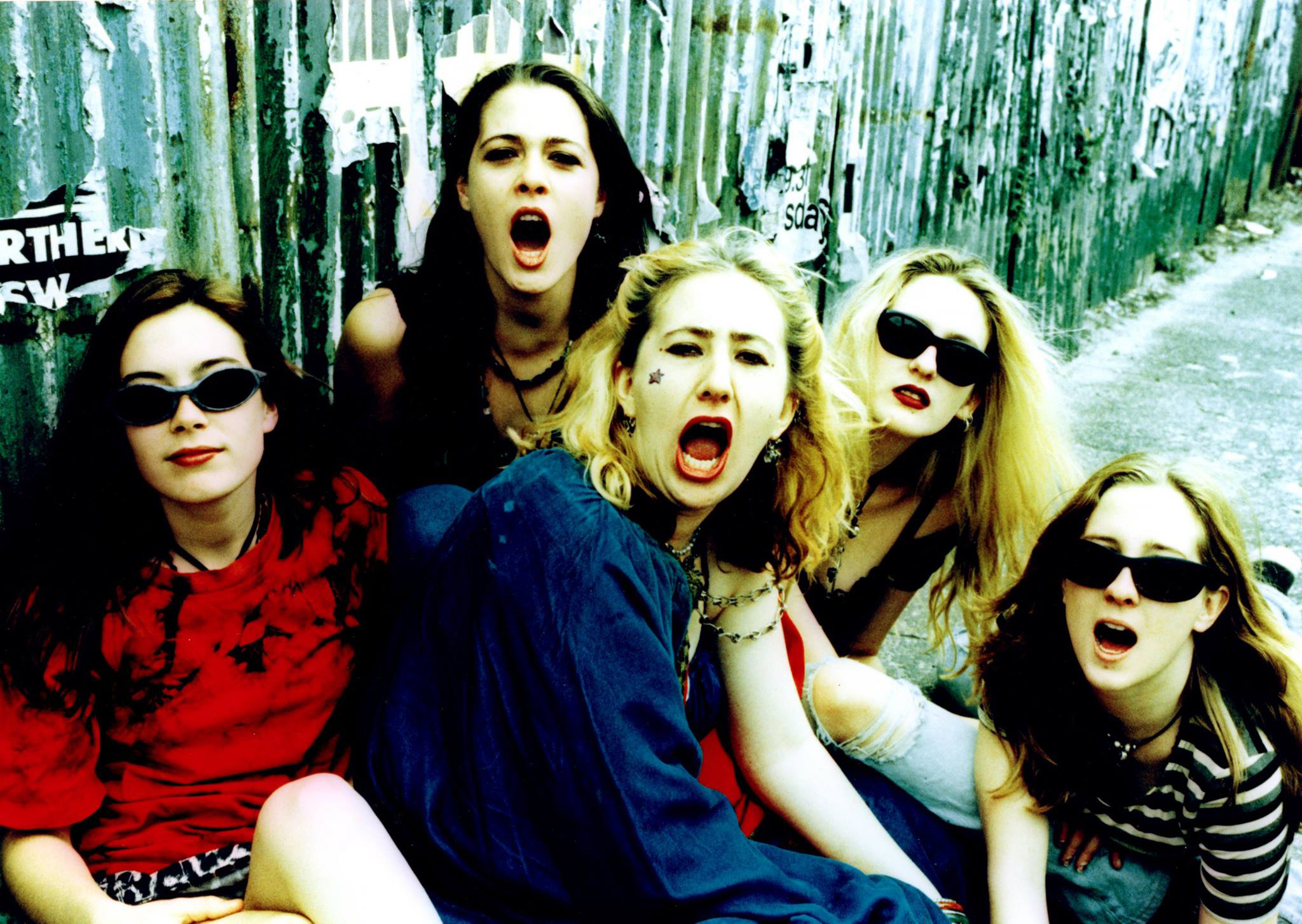
From left to right, Andrea Stanway, Jessamine Finlayson, Morgana Ancone, Sara Anderson and Kira Taylor

Nitocris were formed in Sydney in 1992 by Sara Louise Anderson (aka Sara Graye) on bass guitar, Jessamine Jean Finlayson on lead guitar, Andrea Marie Stanway on drums and Kira Taylor on rhythm guitar. The four were classmates at Hunters Hill High School and had an average age of 14. At the time none could play their instruments. A year later, a newspaper advertisement in Drum Media recruited Morgana Ancone as a vocalist, who was the only member over the age of 18. The band's name was found by Stanway from the semi-legendary female Pharaoh of the same name, which was popularised in fiction by H. P. Lovecraft, as "queen of the underworld". As four members were under legal age, when Nitocris performed live across Sydney pubs they were sometimes accompanied by their mothers. Ancone's costume included a "designed red tartan bodice and black tutu". The group appeared on-stage alongside Armoured Angel, Frenzal Rhomb and Blitz Babies. Nitocris were influenced by punk rock and heavy metal artists including Black Sabbath, The Clash, Guns N' Roses, Joan Jett and the Blackhearts, Dead Kennedys, Slayer, Janis Joplin and Patti Smith.

In January 1994 Nitocris performed at the annual Big Day Out music festival at the Sydney venue. The group released their debut four-track extended play, Ten Stories Down on local independent label, Phantom Records in June. In September they issued, "Suxiety" as a shared single with the other side, "Grrly Things" by another Sydney all-girl group, Purr. Nitocris were one of the country's first all-female punk rockers of the "grot grrrls" movement (analogous to the United States riot grrrls). Other groups in the "grot grrls" movement were Fur, Mace, Bittersweet, Sulk, Dolljuice, Gravelrash and SPDFGH.

The group's debut album Screaming Dolorous followed in November 1994, it included a cover version of Black Sabbath's 1970 song "N.I.B.". In April 1995 the band toured the east coast with the Alternative Nation Festival. Nitocris developed a devoted following, and regularly toured across the country: including with Sprung Monkey, The Cult, The Pursuit of Happiness, The Whitlams, Screaming Jets, Deep Purple, Rancid, Def FX, Pennywise, Midnight Oil, and Suicidal Tendencies. In October they issued Epic Voyage as a five-track EP. It included their live version of AC/DC's 1976 single, "Dirty Deeds Done Dirt Cheap". In June 1995, Nitocris' studio version of the same track had appeared on the AC/DC tribute album, Fuse Box: The Alternative Tribute.

In February 1996 they issued the Hyperland EP, which was a reasonable success for the band but their next release Butter (1997) fared less well and problems with their former manager stalled progress for some time. However, in 1999, Nitocris toured nationally for the first time as part of a package, Turn Up Your Radio. In January, their Dark Side EP was released with a music video for the lead track directed by Margot Nash and Jane Castle. Their self-titled album issued in 2000 displayed a mellower, poppier style that won high rotation radio airplay on Triple J. Early copies of Nitocris included a bonus disc compiling "Ten Stories Down", "Haemorrhaging Souls", "Sycophant", "Butter", "Dark Side" and "I Love Rock 'n' Roll" (cover of the Arrows 1975 recording) from previous releases.

Nitocris received an ARIA Award for Best Independent Release for their EP Manic. The band toured Australia-wide with the Big Day Out in 2001 and followed with their own Manic Tour from mid-February to May. Although plans had been made to record a third album and tour overseas, however the group split up and played a final show at the Newtown Festival in November 2001.

== Afterwards ==
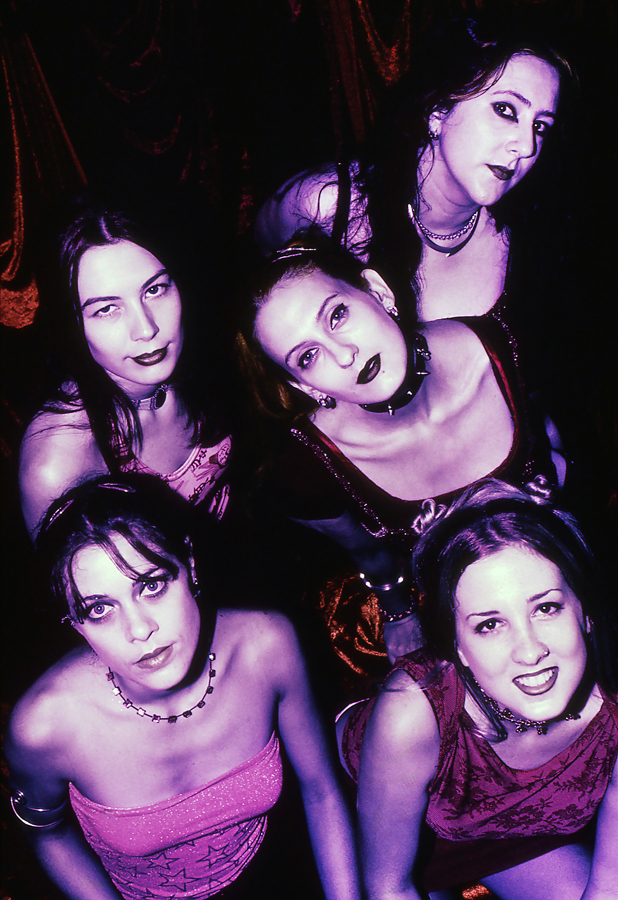
Nitocris - Press shot from photo shoot with Corrie Ancone

Finlayson and Stanway performed together in a band, The Fyreflyes, until the drummer left in 2004. That band had recorded a number of EPs. Finlayson announced a solo career in 2007 and her first single was released in May 2009. From November 2010, Finlayson has fronted Jessamine, which released a self-titled album in September 2011. Ancone formed Morgana and the Monstars, which have two releases and have incorporated up to 13 guests and musicians on the recordings. Ancone writes and performs with Boxing with Ghosts, The fangin' Felines and The Sugar Beats and sometimes solo and with her acoustic group Tiny & The Broken Hearts.

Anderson (later known as Sara Graye) has guested on recordings and performed live for Morgana and the Monstars and for Fyreflyes. Later teaming up with Simon Day (ex-Ratcat) on a number of projects, The Prostitutes, The Substitutes, The Fangin' Felines, The Sugar Beats and The Follow. Anderson has also performed with Iota and Tex Perkins. In October–November 2007, Graye joined Doc Neeson's Angels on Tour de Force – Middle East 8 to entertain the troops in Afghanistan and Iraq. Graye worked with electro pop outfit Dark Disco (with a track soon to be released in the states) and played with Mark Raparager. Since 2008, she designs for and manages her own fashion label, 50 ft Queenie.

Nitocris played a reunion show at the Annandale Hotel on 26 September 2009.

== Discography ==
=== Studio albums ===
Title	Album details	Peak chart positions
Title	Album details	AUS
Screaming Dolorous	Released: November 1994; Label: Phantom (PHCD-42); Format: CD	—
Nitocris	Released: 2000; Label: Phantom (PHCD-88); Format: 2×CD, 2×LP	55

=== Extended plays ===
Title	EP details
Ten Stories Down	Released: 1994; Label: Phantom (PHMCD-36); Format: CD
Epic Voyage	Released: 1995; Label: Phantom (PHMCD-52); Format: CD
Hyperland	Released: February 1996; Label: Phantom (PHMCD-54); Format: CD
Butter	Released: 1997; Label: Phantom (PHMCD-67); Format: CD
Dark Side	Released: 1998; Label: Phantom (PHMCD-76); Format: CD
Manic	Released: 2001; Label: Phantom (PHMCD-89); Format: CD

== Awards and nominations ==
=== ARIA Music Awards ===
The ARIA Music Awards are a set of annual ceremonies presented by Australian Recording Industry Association (ARIA), which recognise excellence, innovation, and achievement across all genres of the music of Australia. They commenced in 1987.

Year	Nominee / work	Award	Result	Ref.
2001	Manic	Best Independent Release	Nominated	
