= Telemetry Orchestra =

Australian electronic music group

- Origin: Sydney, New South Wales, Australia
- Genre: Electronica
- Years active: Late 1990s–present
- Members: Gavin Angus-Leppan; Charlotte Whittingham; Steve Scott

Telemetry Orchestra are an Australian electronic music group formed in Sydney in the late 1990s composed of members Steve Scott, Gavin Angus-Leppan (guitar and vocals) and Charlotte Whittingham. They have released three albums, with several singles receiving regular airplay on national radio broadcaster 2JJJ and the ABC music program rage. In October 2013 they released a new E.P. called Out of Nowhere, which includes six tracks written, performed and recorded by Gavin and Charlotte.

The video clip of their 2006 single "Under the Cherry Tree", by Sydney-based digital visual effects company Animal Logic won an award in early 2007 in New York.

== Discography ==
=== Albums ===
- Out of Nowhere E.P. (2013)
- Empire (2006)
- Children Stay Free (2003)
- Live Better Electrically (1998)

=== Singles ===
- "Smoke and Mirrors" (2016)
- "Silvertongue" (2013)
- "Flicker/Hole in the Roof" (2007)
- "Under the Cherry Tree" (2006)
- "Hazy Elevator" (2006)
- "Under the Knife" (2003)
- "Suburban Harmony" (2003)
