= David Haberfeld =

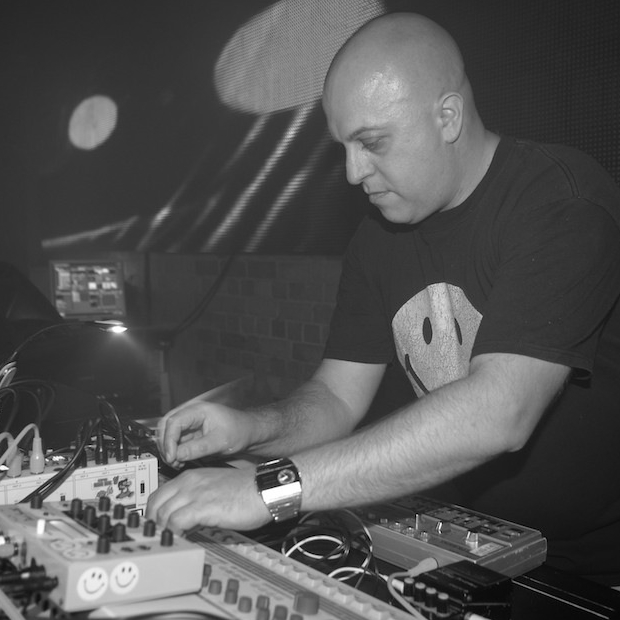
- Performing as Honeysmack in 2011

Background information
- Born: 1969 (age 56–57); Melbourne, Australia
- Genres: Acid House, techno, minimal techno, electro, mashup
- Occupations: Music producer, composer, performer, improviser, dj, academic
- Instruments: synthesizer, drum machines, modular synthesizer
- Years active: 1992–present
- Labels: Hand Made Acid, Smelly Records, Kickin Records, Zomba, Jive Electro, Shock, Idiot House, Sony BMG
- Website: davidhaberfeld.com honeysmack.info

David Haberfeld (born 1969, in Melbourne) is an Australian electronic dance music producer, performer, DJ and educator. Best known for his productions and live performances as Honeysmack, he is a proponent of acid house and techno music styles.

== Career ==
During his studies at the Royal Melbourne Institute of Technology (RMIT) in media arts, Haberfeld began experimenting with electronic dance music. Soon he was collaborating with electronic composer Phillip Samartzis under the name Hysterical Systems. Their 5-track EP was released in 1993/94 by UK dance label Kickin' Records.

In 1994, Haberfeld started his first independent record label, Smelly Records. Initial releases included his Pura project, a hard-acid outfit called Cynosure (with Phillip Samartzis), PIN (with Voiteck Andersen), Graham Mono (with Adam Raisbeck and Scott Anderson). The first full-length release was the Smelly Records Compilation CD in 1996. As Honeysmack, he released his first full length artist album, Honeysmack Live (1997), a collection of live recordings taken from performances at underground clubs in Australia such as Club Filter Melbourne.

Along with his performances as a live electronic dance music artist during the mid 1990s, Haberfeld gained respect with rock audiences with his punk approach and attitude as Honeysmack. Intersecting the genres of rock and dance, he soon become a fixture at popular Australian rock events and festivals, including Big Day Out, Falls Festival, Meredith Music Festival and to a large extent at dance music festivals and events.

In 1999, Honeysmack's song "Walk On Acid"—which sampled the melody from Burt Bacharach's "Walk On By"—became a popular hit. The song was a nominee for the Best Dance Artist Release at the Australian Recording Industry Association ARIA Music Awards of 1999. The video (directed by Philip Brophy) accompanying the single was the source of some controversy after being withdrawn due to legal action brought on by the Coca Cola Company, which objected to one of their vending machines appearing behind a scantily dressed dancer. "Walk on Acid" featured on Honeysmack's studio album Flick Bubble in 1999. "Walk On Acid" was listed in The 100 Greatest Australian Dance Tracks Of All Time in 2015.

In 2002, it was announced that he would perform as a supporting act on Britney Spears' Australian tour to promote her album Britney and the film Crossroads.

Haberfeld combines the musical influences of punk, disco, early hip-hop, electro, kraut rock and synthpop. He studied under Philip Brophy at RMIT; they have since collaborated on various projects, including the Brophy-produced Honeysmack album Rock in 2002. As an example of contemporary Australian electronic music, Haberfeld's work was exhibited at the San Francisco Museum of Modern Art in September of the same year. He has collaborated with a diverse range of artists encompassing different styles, including performing in a quartet with Jacq Gawler (Coco's Lunch), Anthony Schulz (Zulya and the Children of the Underground) and Adam Starr (Frock). Haberfeld produced Frock's last album, "One Room One Day" in 2016.

He and Antonio Celestino formed the DJ duo Acid Jacks in 2004. Acid Jacks were ranked in the top 50 DJs in Australia by popular vote in 2007 and 2008. The pair presented a different twist on the electro and fidget house genres. As part of Acid Jacks, Haberfeld and Celestino founded the record label Idiot House. In 2009, Haberfeld parted ways with Acid Jacks and Idiot House to return to his productions as Honeysmack.

Haberfeld formed a new techno and acid house label, Hand Made Acid, in 2010.

David Haberfeld holds a Master of Arts in Media Arts from RMIT, a Postgraduate Diploma in Music Technology from La Trobe University and a Bachelor of Fine Arts in Media Arts from RMIT. He completed a PhD in music composition at Monash University in 2021 titled "Bacharach, Britney and Acid Techno Bangers: The Evolving Compositional Practice of Honeysmack". He was a lecturer in the Bachelor of Music (Interactive Composition) at The University of Melbourne Faculty of VCA and MCM. between 2016-2019.

== Discography ==
=== Albums ===
- Hysterical Systems – Kickin Records, 1994
- PIN – Smelly Records, 1995
- Honeysmack Live – Smelly Records, 1997
- Flick Bubble (also known as Fuck Bubble) – Smelly Records/DanceNet MDS, 1999
- Awake Since 78 – xylophone jones Records, 2006
- Mookie – Trouble & Bass Recordings, 2007
- Brainss! – Idiot House Records, 2008
- Pump It Up – Idiot House Records, 2008
- Post Acid – Awesome Soundwave 2020

== Awards ==
The ARIA Music Awards is an annual awards ceremony that recognises excellence, innovation, and achievement across all genres of Australian music. They commenced in 1987. Honeysmack was nominated for one award.

Year	Nominee / work	Award	Result
1999	"Walk on Acid"	Best Dance Release	Nominated
