= Clan Analogue =

- Founded: 1992
- Founder: Brendan Palmer; Tobias Kazumichi Grime; Jamie Stevens; Sharif Hansa; Chris Bell; Bo Daley; Scott McPhee; James McParlane
- Genre: Electronic; dance
- Country of origin: Australia
- Location: Sydney, New South Wales; Melbourne, Victoria; Canberra, Australian Capital Territory; Brisbane, Queensland
- Official website: clananalogue.org

Clan Analogue is an Australian record label which started in 1992 as a collective by a number of individuals interested and active in electronic music and with a shared passion for analogue synthesisers and digital culture.

== History ==
Producer, broadcaster, DJ and artist, Brendan Palmer, was the label manager from 1992 to 1995. He helped establish the collective, originally in Sydney, including the Clan Analogue record label and organising performance events. During this period the label released vinyl extended plays, a compilation CD (Cog) and cassette tapes. Naomi Mapstone of The Canberra Times reviewed the fourth EP, which "features live, acts from Canberra and Sydney, playing rave, industrial, garage and hardcore."

Clan Analogue signed a distribution agreement with Mushroom Records' Mushroom Distribution Services by 1994. In its early years the record label published a newsletter, Kronic Oscillator, and hosted stages at two consecutive Big Day Out festivals. They established a regular club night, "Electronic", at the Bentley Bar in Sydney.

In the early years of Clan Analogue membership attracted individuals who were interested and active in electronic sound in Australia, including Palmer, Tobias Kazumichi Grime, Antony Bannister, Sharif Hansa, Garry Bradbury (Severed Heads, Size), George Soropos, Scot Art, Chris Bell, Bo Daley (Dark Network), Rosie X (Geekgirl), Nick Wilson, Jasper Russell, Seb Chan, Luke Dearnley (Sub Bass Snarl), Andy Fitzgerald, Ali Omar (Atone), Adrian Black, Lisa Bode, James McParlane, Jamie Stevens, Benj Askins (Infusion), Kate Crawford, Nicole Skeltys (B(if)tek), Gordon Finlayson, Ian Andrews (Disco Stu), Mark Ireland (Carrier), Cindi Drennan, Justin Maynard (Tesseract), Grant Muir (VJ Morph), Roslyn McGinty (Bass Bitch), Elle Stearn (Lush Puppy), Marty Wells (Batfreak), Murray Creagh.

The collective's appeal was largely fuelled by the sore lack of live venues in Australia for electronic music and a lack of options for releasing recorded material. On 25 March 1994 a live performance at the Goethe Institut, Sydney, was recorded for a video album, Clan Analogue Live (1994), with Palmer as producer.

Following Brendan's departure from the collective in 1995 to start Zonar Records, journalist, DJ and lawyer Gordon Finlayson took over as label manager of the Clan Analogue record label and the collective established a decentralised system of operations with individuals such as Scot Art, Antony Bannister, lLisa Bode, Nick Wilson, Toby Grime, Mark Ireland, Chris Bell, Bo Daley, Rick Bull (Deep Child) and Charlotte Whittingham all taking roles in managing the ongoing operations of the collective. During this period the label's output including numerous thematic compilation CDs such as Cognition, Jaunt, 20 Disco Greats, Aphelion, Solid Gold and Pre-Sense as well as solo releases from artists such as Deep Child, The Telemetry Orchestra, Nerve Agent, The 5000 Fingers of Dr T, Disco Stu, Atone and Dark Network.

In 2001 Melbourne based Nick Wilson took over the management of the Clan Analogue record label and remains the label manager until the present date. During that period Clan Analogue has continued to maintain an extensive release schedule of CDs, LPs and digital downloads with notable solo artist releases from Bleepin' J. Squawkins, Valley Forge, Winduptoys, Lunar Module and Dsico and critically acclaimed compilations such as 'Headspace: A Tribute to Severed Heads' and 'Re Cognition: The Clan Analogue Legacy Collection' released on the 20th anniversary of the formation of the collective.

Clan Analogue quickly established itself as the pioneer of electronic art in Australia, publishing EPs, LPs, CDs, Videos, DVDs, Web sites and digital downloads while also organising and promoting live electronic music. Clan Analogue and its members have also hosted various radio programs on 2SER (Electroplastique), 2MBS (The Transcendental Anaesthetic), 2RSR, FBI and RRR.

From its start Clan Analogue promoted the live electronic music and video art with events held in The Goethe Institute, The Art gallery of NSW and The Museum of Contemporary Art. Starting with small club nights, Clan soon started hosting parties that attracted hundreds and then thousands of patrons, including the pioneering club night 'Electronic', stages at festivals such as The Big Day Out and Freaky Loops and one-off events like Crunch, Transdimensional Vehicle (with psychedelic philosopher Terence McKenna) and Thank God It's Friday.

Clan Analogue was one part of a wider, thriving electronic music scene in the 90s & 00s in Australia alongside other underground electronic collectives and crews such as the Vibe Tribe, Frigid, Punos, Club Kooky and Elefant Traks.

Since its inception, Clan Analogue has released over 30 albums directly with many more releases coming from collective members such as Deep Child, B(if)tek, Disco Stu, Artificial, Dark Network, Atone, Lunar Module, Carrier and Telemetry Orchestra through other labels. Its stated philosophy is: "as a social circuit board, Clan enables the building of networks by providing members with access to equipment, knowledge and advice, along with the opportunity to play live and co-produce music." The release schedule as busy now as it was in the 90's, continuing to release cutting-edge electronic music, host events and foster a global community of artists involved in electronic music.

== Associated artists and DJs ==
- Atone
- Ant Banister (Clan President, Mastering Engineer, Exec Producer and Public Officer 1999- present)
- Brendan Palmer AKA bP (Label Manager 1992–1995)
- B(if)tek
- Carrier – member of Clan Analogue
- Dark Network
- Deep Child
- Koshowko
- Lunar Module
- Nerve Agent
- The Telemetry Orchestra
- Bleepin' J. Squawkins
- Pretty Boy Crossover
- Winduptoys
- SS Spanky
- Dsico
- Deepchild
- Continuum
- Bass Bitch
- Lush Puppy
- Ding
- Hashbang Spacestar
- Sub Bass Snarl
- Marty Batfreak
- Fluffy T. Bunny
- Infusion
- Des Peres
- Purple World
- Tesseract
- signal-to-noise (a.k.a. s2n2s2n)
- Nick Wilson (Label Manager 2002 – present)\
- Image Byte Kid
- Zog

== Releases ==
- CA044: INTONE Various Artists
- CA039K: THE TRUTH IN ME Koshowko
- CA038: RE COGNITION – THE CLAN ANALOGUE LEGACY COLLECTION Various Artists
- CA037: DOUBLE EXPOSURE Winduptoys
- CA037A: SWITCH ON Winduptoys
- CA036K: PROMISE Koshowko
- CA036B: INVERTED – FURTHER DUB SELECTIONS Various Artists
- CA036: IN VERSION Various Artists
- CA036A: OVER AND OVER DUB Dsico
- CA035: FLOPPY DISCO Bleepin' J. Squawkins
- CA034: DOPPLER SHIFT Various Artists
- CA033: LATE SET Dark Network
- CA032: DEFOCUS: LOW RES PRODUCTIONS Various Artists
- CA031: ANY NUMBER CAN PLAY Pretty Boy Crossover
- CA030: HABITAT Various Artists
- CA029: AN ENGLISHMAN IN IBIZA Disco Stu
- CA028: COGNITION 4 – SOLID GOLD Various Artists
- CA027: PEAR SHAPED Pear Shaped / Atone
- CA026: HYMNS FROM BABYLON Deepchild
- CA025: COGNITION 3 Various Artists
- CA024: BUTTSQUEEZER 5000 Fingers of Dr T
- CA023: G-TYPE Nerve Agent
- CA022: ADULT THEMES Disco Stu
- CA021: PRE-SENSE : A CONVERGENCE OF SOUTHERN HARMONIC WAVES Various Artists
- CA020: COGNITION 2: TWENTY DISCO GREATS Various Artists
- CA019: LIVE BETTER ELECTRICALLY Telemetry Orchestra
- CA017: JAUNT 2 Various Artists
- CA016: ORANGE CHROME 5000 Fingers of Dr T
- CA015: CRUCIFIED, STITCHED UP AND THEN SOME Atone
- CA014: COGNITION Various Artists
- CA012: JAUNT Various Artists
- CA011: APHELION ONE Various Artists
- CA007: COG Various Artists
- CA004: EP4 Various Artists
- CA003: Deep Three EP Various Artists
- CA002: EP2 Various Artists
- CA001: EP1 Various Artists
