= Nicole Skeltys =

Australian composer

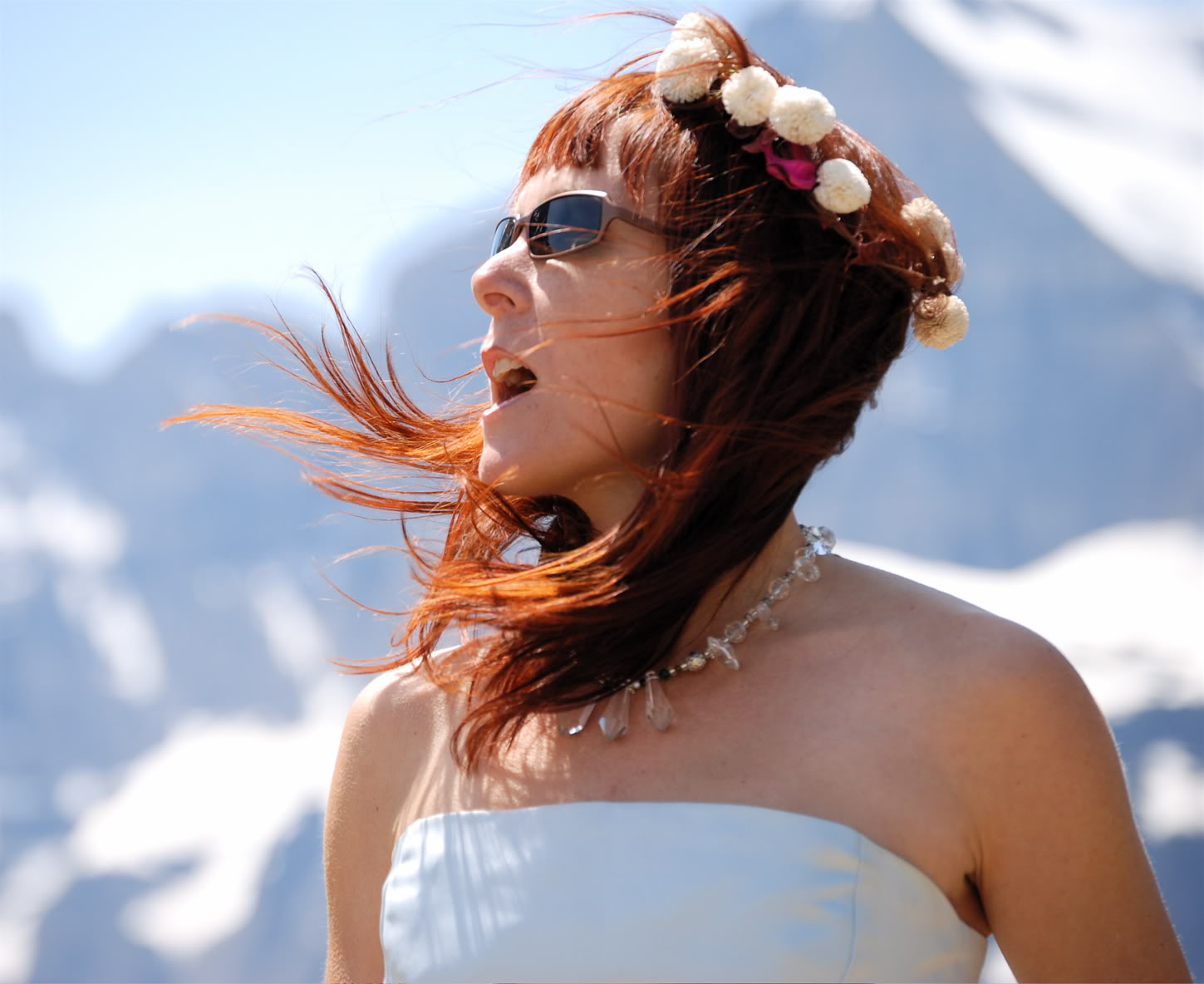

Background information
- Also known as: Artificial
- Origin: Brisbane, Australia
- Occupation: Composer
- Years active: 1992–present
- Labels: Sony, Shock, Festival Mushroom, Creative Vibes, Psy-Harmonics, Inertia, Uh Oh, Nephilim, Mana, MUK
- Website: nicoleskeltys.com

Nicole Skeltys is an Australian composer. From 1993 to 2003 she was part of B(if)tek, an electronica and dance act. Skeltys also released electronic music under the name Artificial during this period and was a member of Clan Analogue. In 2002, she was the writer for the webcomic Pigeon Coup. She co-composed the soundtrack for the first season of Lonely Planet TV series Lonely Planet Six Degrees. After B(if)tek split in 2004, Skeltys established the Melbourne-based band Dust, consisting of vocals, keyboards, guitar, bass, and drums, and which has been described as a "mixture of country twang, melancholy folk and urban scrawl, all with psychedelic overtones." In late 2007, she established a psychedelic folk duo called The Jilted Brides with American filmmaker and photographer Tanya Andrea Stadelmann, and in 2008 and 2009 took up a number of artist residencies across the United States. In 2009, Skeltys became an artist-in-residence at Pittsburgh Filmmakers. Skeltys has produced a short music mockumentary, which won a Platinum REMI award for group music video production at the 2012 WorldFest-Houston International Film Festival.

In 2011, Skeltys and Byron Scullin produced the soundtrack to the documentary film A Life Exposed. In 2013, Skeltys released the compilation album Citizens United, followed by Deal with Your Disenchantment in 2018. About the latter album, she said: "I wanted to reimagine myself looking at the world through Bob Dylan's eyes in the '60s/early '70s – only I'm a 21st-century woman, and the political and social issues are the ones we are dealing with now." After release of Deal with your Disenchantment, Skeltys performed at venues in London, the Northcote Social Club, and the Ealing Blues Festival.

In 2019, while living in London, Skeltys became interested in local artist-activists who were critiquing financialization, highlighting damaging social impacts of post-1980s banking and finance practices. Skeltys was inspired to start researching and composing a rock opera about London’s finance industry. The resultant work, Canary Wharf: the Rock Opera, was released as two albums (soundtrack and full theatrical work versions) in early 2023, with the support of La Trobe University, where Skeltys is undertaking a PhD in creative arts. Her film to accompany the album premiered in Melbourne at Thornbury Picture House in April 2023.
