= Andrez Bergen =

Australian musician and author

- Bergen, June 2007
- Born: Melbourne, Victoria, Australia
- Other names: Little Nobody
- Years active: 1996–present
- Organization(s): IF? Records, IF? Commix
- Notable work: Pop Tart, Action Hero
- Style: Electronic
- Spouse: Yoko Umehara
- Children: Cocoa Bergen
- Website: andrezbergen.wordpress.com

Andrez Simon Bergen is an Australian musician and writer. As of 2014, Bergen lived in Tokyo, Japan with his wife, Yoko Umehara, and their daughter Cocoa. He has performed and released electronic music as Little Nobody.

== Biography ==
Andrez Simon Bergen, was born in Melbourne. With his friends Brian Huber and Mateusz Sikora established a record label, IF? Records in 1995 in Melbourne. As Little Nobody, he worked as a DJ and issued an album, Pop Tart in September 1998 on his label. One of its tracks is "Tobacco-Stained Mountain Goat".

In April 2011 Bergen published his first novel, Tobacco-Stained Mountain Goat, via Another Sky Press. Nalini Haynes of Dark Matter Zine observed it is written in a "pseudo-stream-of-consciousness style" and warns that it "requires the reader to be familiar with numerous films from the mid-twentieth century." His second novel, One Hundred Years of Vicissitude, appeared in the following year. It "is by turns educational, inspiring, traumatic and humorous" according to Fantasy Book Review's Floresiensis.

== Bibliography ==
=== Novels ===
- Bergen, Andrez (April 2011), Young, Kristopher (ed.), Tobacco-Stained Mountain Goat: a Novel, Portland, OR: Another Sky Press, ISBN 978-0-9845597-2-5
- Bergen, Andrez (2012), One Hundred Years of Vicissitude, Washington, USA: Perfect Edge Books, ISBN 978-1-78099-598-4
- Bergen, Andrez (2013), Who Is Killing the Great Capes of Heropa?, John Hunt Publishing, ISBN 978-1-78279-234-5
- Bergen, Andrez (2014), Depth Charging Ice Planet Goth, John Hunt Publishing, ISBN 978-1-78279-648-0
- Bergen, Andrez (2015), Small Change: a Casebook of Scherer and Miller, Investigators of the Paranormal and Supermundane, Winchester, UK: Roundfire Books, ISBN 978-1-78535-219-5
- Bergen, Andrez (2016), Bullet Gal, Winchester, UK: Roundfire Books, ISBN 978-1-78535-562-2

=== Short stories ===
- Bergen, Andrez (2013), The Condimental Op, John Hunt Publishing, ISBN 978-1-78279-188-1
- Black/White (2014)
