= Gersey =

Australian rock band

- Origin: Melbourne, Victoria, Australia
- Genres: Rock, alternative rock, shoegazing, indie rock
- Years active: 1997–present
- Labels: Way Over There; Trifekta; Inertia
- Members: Daryl Bradie; Matt Davis; Craig Jackson; Danny Tulen; Robert F. Cranny
- Past members: Drew Pearse
- Website: Official site

Gersey are an Australian rock band based in Melbourne, which formed in 1997. Since its debut album, the band has featured the core membership of Craig Jackson (vocals, bass), Daryl Bradie (guitar), Matt Davis (guitar) and Danny Tulen (drums).

== History ==
=== Formation and sound ===
The band are among a number of Australian indie rock bands formed in the mid-late 1990s who were partly influenced by the shoegaze movement of the early 1990s, including Gaslight Radio. Matt Davis was himself a peripheral member of Gaslight Radio before the formation of Gersey.

However, the band are best known for their spacious arrangements and their dynamic range, best typified by the Australian bands that alongside themselves and Gaslight Radio, chose to work with Australian record producer, Tim Whitten, including 78 Saab & Art of Fighting.

A 2006 review on FasterLouder.com marked this progression, declaring: "No longer content to be another local band filling out the shoegazer scene, the five-piece are now capable of producing material of a far more epic nature".

Steve Kilbey, from The Church commented: "You will never really pin these songs down. Without ever trying to be 'mysterious' this music with its repetitions which blur and softly distort, the detached vague lyrics and voice which seamlessly becomes another element, is".

=== Recordings ===
The band began their recording careers with the now-rare EP "Bewilderment Is A Blessing" (1999). Since then they have released four full-length albums. Their first two albums, Hope Springs (2000) and Storms Dressed as Stars (2002), were both produced with Tim Whitten (The Clouds, Underground Lovers) at Megaphon Studios in Sydney. Both albums were re-released in 2005 as deluxe editions, with the Hope Springs deluxe edition also including their debut EP in full.

It took the band four years to return for their third album No Satellites (2006). The group finally entered the studio with Dean Turner, a member of Australian act Magic Dirt, who had produced Riff Random and theredsunband. Whitten mixed the album.

In April 2010, Mess+Noise interviewed Craig Jackson, who said the chances of a fourth album were "very good" following the band's return to the live circuit. Gersey sent a message to fans in October 2014, announcing that work on a new album was completed. The album, What You Kill, was eventually released in 2016.

=== Side projects ===
In the following years, the band pursued personal projects, many of which included contributions from fellow Gersey bandmates. Matt Davis started the project, Bombazine Black, which also featured Danny Tulen on drums and Daryl Bradie on guitar. Tulen, Bradie and former fifth member, Drew Pearse formed the band Tall Buildings. Jackson formed the band Sirens of Venice with his wife Camilla Jackson, releasing a self-titled album through Speak N Spell Records in 2010. In 2019, Tulen & Bradie formed Walkerville, a two-piece garageband with plans to release an EP in early 2020. Danny has had support and ideas from his son, Sunny.

=== Pavement tour ===
In 2010, Gersey returned to the road, performing an 11-date national tour which included seven theatre shows supporting American band, Pavement. Music writer Chris Wood explained the history between the two bands: "The Pavement/Gersey connection goes back almost ten years with Gersey performing its first US shows with Spiral Stairs' Preston School of Industry in 2001. Gersey and PSOI released a split seven-inch in 2003 and they have twice toured Australia together. More recently, members of Gersey have performed with Spiral Stairs on his solo album and as his touring band".

== Discography ==
=== Albums ===
- Hope Springs (2000, Trifekta)
- Storms Dressed as Stars (2002, Trifekta)
- No Satellites (2006, Inertia Recordings)
- What You Kill (2016)

=== EPs ===
- Bewilderment Is A Blessing (1999, Way Over There)
- Eyes Are Wide Tonight (2005, Inertia Recordings)
