= Mixed Up Everything =

Australian hard rock band

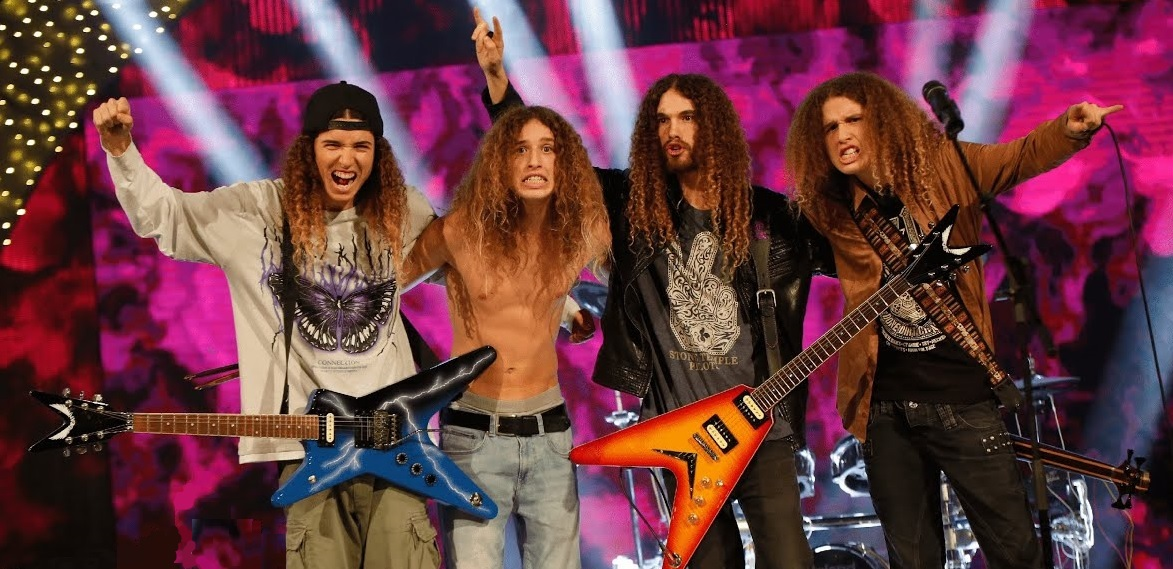
- Mixed Up Everything performing in 2022, Portokalli TV. Left to right: Blake Dhima, Kevin Dhima, Todd Dhima and Koby Dhima.

Background information
- Origin: Melbourne, Australia
- Genres: Hard rock; grunge; Aussie rock
- Years active: 2012–present
- Label: MIXEDUPEVERYTHING
- Members: Todd Dhima; Kevin Dhima; Blake Dhima; Koby Dhima
- Website: www.mixedupeverything.com

Mixed Up Everything is an Australian rock band formed in Melbourne in 2016 when they first began writing originals. The band consists of four brothers Todd (lead vocals, guitar), Kevin (drums), Blake (guitar) and Koby Dhima (bass, vocals). The band gained prominence through their covers of bands such as Metallica, Alice In Chains and The Offspring amassing over 100 million views online. They have released 3 studio albums Ex-Nihilo (2017), I Choose (2021) and What’s The Rush Now? (2024).

== Career ==
The band of brothers started playing together as early as 2006 where they would ‘perform’ for their parents using tennis racquets as guitars and cushions as drums. In 2014, they started busking on the streets of Melbourne where they would earn up to $1000 a day. The band became well known for their YouTube videos catching the attention of major rock bands such as Scorpions, Foo Fighters, and The Offspring. As of July 2025, the band have accumulated over 150,000,000 views on their YouTube channel. At the time of their debut studio album, Ex-Nihilo released in 2017, the boys were 18, 16, 15 and 13 years old.

The band began touring Europe in 2018. Near the end of their 18 months on the road touring, the band became stranded in Albania, when the COVID-19 pandemic hit. Albania closed its borders and the band had no choice but to stay. Since then the band later supported The Offspring in Melbourne in November 2024 and have played festivals alongside bands like the Scorpions, Five Finger Death Punch, Amon Amarth, Kreator and more.

== Members ==
- Todd Dhima – Lead vocals, Rhythm and Lead Guitar
- Kevin Dhima – Drums
- Blake Dhima – Lead and Rhythm Guitar, backing vocals
- Koby Dhima – Bass guitar, backing vocals

== Discography ==
Mixed Up Everything discography
- Studio albums: 3
- Singles: 11
- Music videos: 10

=== Studio albums ===
| Title | Details |
|---|---|
| Ex-Nihilo | Released: 14 December 2017; Label: MIXEDUPEVERYTHING; Format: CD, Digital download, streaming |
| I Choose | Released: 30 July 2021; Label: MIXEDUPEVERYTHING; Format: CD, Digital download, streaming |
| What’s The Rush Now? | Released: 12 July 2024; Label: MIXEDUPEVERYTHING; Format: CD, Vinyl, Digital download, streaming |

=== Singles ===
| Title | Year | Album |
|---|---|---|
| "Tranquilliser" | 2020 | I Choose |
| "What If?" | 2020 | I Choose |
| "Knucklehead" | 2021 | I Choose |
| "Soak My Brain" | 2021 | I Choose |
| "The Bike" | 2022 | — |
| "Would You Be Me?" | 2024 | What’s The Rush Now? |
| "She Hates Me Not" | 2024 | What’s The Rush Now? |
| "Having Fun" | 2024 | What’s The Rush Now? |
| "Normality" | 2024 | What’s The Rush Now? |
| "In Your Shoes" | 2026 | Tinnitus |
| "Better Off (Without You)" | 2026 | Tinnitus |

=== Music videos ===
| Year | Title | Album |
|---|---|---|
| 2020 | "What If?" | I Choose |
| 2021 | "Knucklehead" | I Choose |
| 2021 | "Soak My Brain" | I Choose |
| 2022 | "The Bike" | —N/a |
| 2024 | "Would You Be Me?" | What’s The Rush Now? |
| 2024 | "She Hates Me Not" | What’s The Rush Now? |
| 2024 | "Having Fun" | What’s The Rush Now? |
| 2024 | "Normality" | What’s The Rush Now? |
| 2026 | "In Your Shoes" | Tinnitus |
| 2026 | "Better Off (Without You)" | Tinnitus |
