= Good Fortune =

Good Fortune may refer to:

- Good Fortune (Brotherhood of Man album), released in 1980
- "Good Fortune" (song), a song by PJ Harvey, released in 2000
- Good Fortune (78 Saab album), released in 2010
- Good Fortune (film), a 2025 comedy film by Aziz Ansari

== See also ==
- Good fortune, the concept of luck
- Lakshmi Vijayam (disambiguation)
- Mazal Tov, A phrase which translates to good luck.
