= Rock music in Australia =

- Other names: Australian rock; Oz rock; Aussie rock
- Stylistic origins: Rock; rock and roll
- Cultural origins: The 1950s and 1960s in Australia

Rock music in Australia, also known as Oz rock, Australian rock, and Aussie rock, has a rich history, rooted in an appreciation of various rock genres originating in the United States and Britain, and to a lesser extent, in continental Europe and Africa. Australian rock has also contributed to the development of some of these genres, as well as having its own unique Australiana sound with pub rock and its Indigenous music.

From 1955 to 1975, three distinct "waves" of Australian rock occurred. The first wave was from 1955 to 1963 and was influenced by American and British styles with local variants provided by artists such as Johnny O'Keefe, who had a hit with "Wild One", which appeared in July 1958. Late in that stage, clean-cut acts, which featured on TV's Bandstand and toured as the "Bandstand family", were representing local music on the record charts. The second wave from 1964 to 1969 was directly influenced by the Beatles and their tour of the country in June 1964. Two major acts from that era are the Easybeats and Bee Gees. A weekly magazine, Go-Set, which was published from 1966 to 1974 and aimed at teenagers and twenty-year-olds, quickly became the most influential and popular music-related publication of the period. The third wave from 1970 to 1975, with the advent of pub rock, was typified by early exponents, Billy Thorpe and the Aztecs, Blackfeather, and Buffalo. Internationally, AC/DC started as a pub rock group in November 1973 and became one of the most well-known Australian rock bands, with more than 71 million sales in the US alone by 2014. Beginning in that era was Countdown, which was a popular music TV program on national broadcaster ABC and ran from November 1974 until July 1987.

After 1975, Australian rock began to diversify, including local contributors to punk and indie rock styles. By the 1980s baby boomer acts were prominent, which included John Farnham, whose album Whispering Jack (October 1986) peaked at number one on the Australian charts for 25 weeks and was certified 24x platinum indicating shipment of over 1.68 million copies—the highest by any Australian artist. Also in that decade and the next, Indigenous rock groups such as Yothu Yindi and Warumpi Band achieved wider recognition.

== 1950s to early 1960s: "First wave" of Australian rock ==
In the mid-1950s American rockabilly and rock and roll music was taken up by local rock musicians and it soon caught on with Australian teens, through films, records and from 1956, television. Although issued in 1954, "Rock Around the Clock", a single by United States group Bill Haley and His Comets, did not chart in Australia until 1956. Initially considered a novelty song, the track and the related film of the same name: "was like a beginner's guide to rock and roll, and inspired legions of local copyists". In July 1956 Frankie Davidson's cover version of another Haley single, "Rock-A-Beatin' Boogie", was released and is the first charting example of Australian recorded rock and roll, albeit as a minor hit. Other early recorded examples by Australians include non-charting singles: "Saturday Night Fish Fry" by Les Welch (1954), "Rock Around the Clock" by Vic Sabrino (August 1955) and "Washboard Rock 'n' Roll" by the Schneider Sisters (November 1956).

Back in September 1953 US entrepreneur, Lee Gordon, arrived in Sydney and soon established himself nationally by organising a record-breaking tour by US singer Johnnie Ray in August 1954. Australian musicologist, Ian McFarlane, described Gordon as "the 'midwife' of Australian rock 'n' roll, [he] cut an imposing figure in his role as label manager, tour promoter and all-round music entrepreneur". From 1954 to 1962 Gordon's Big Show promotions brought to Australia—in many cases for the first or only time—dozens of US jazz, rock and popular stars, including Louis Armstrong, Ella Fitzgerald, Artie Shaw, Nat King Cole, Frank Sinatra, Bill Haley & the Comets, Little Richard, Buddy Holly & the Crickets, Jerry Lee Lewis, and Chuck Berry. He also promoted local talent by using Australian acts as support on those tours.

In 1956 the Association of Australian Record Manufacturers (AARM) was established to regulate the music industry's releases. United Kingdom's EMI had dominated the Australasian record market since the end of WWII, and they made UK music a powerful force in the late 1950s and 1960s with signings like Cliff Richard and the Shadows, the Beatles, the Hollies and Cilla Black. EMI (Australia) also locally distributed Decca (the Rolling Stones' label) as well as the US Capitol label (the Beach Boys). During this period, however, a number of local companies in Australia expanded into the growing Australian music market, which grew considerably after the emergence of the first wave of American rock 'n' roll. In 1952 merchant bank, Mainguard took over a struggling Sydney engineering firm, retooled and relaunched it as Festival Records. Its main local competition was ARC (Australian Record Company), a former radio production and disc transcription service that established the successful Pacific, Rodeo and Coronet labels and competed with Festival as a manufacturer and distributor in New South Wales.

Although most of the major labels were Sydney-based, Melbourne's vibrant dance and concert scene powered a local boom in rock 'n' roll and pop music and it became Australia's pop capital in the 1960s. During the 1950s luthier Bill May expanded his Maton guitar company, becoming one of the first local manufacturers of the new electric guitars and amplifiers. In 1953 precision engineering company White & Gillespie established a custom recording division, which their company history claims was the first in Australia to press records in the new vinyl microgroove format. The new division soon included the W&G label and studio, which arguably had its biggest success with the earlier Australian releases of Melbourne band, later based in London, the Seekers. In 1960 Melbourne consumer electronics company Astor Electronics created its own record division, Astor Records, which established the Astor label and also became a leading distributor. Festival grabbed an early lead in rock 'n' roll by releasing Haley's "Rock Around the Clock" in Australia in 1956 after it had been turned down by EMI and Decca. It became the biggest-selling hit released in the country up to that time, and its success set Festival on its way to becoming the dominant Australian local record company for the next fifteen years.

During this period Australia experienced an increase in migration, as hundreds of thousands fled post-war Europe. The majority of migrants were from the UK, many of whom were "Ten Pound Poms" who took advantage of the Australian government's A£ 10 assisted-passage fare. Also, for the first time since the 1850s Gold Rush, large numbers of non-Anglo-Celts came from other European countries including Greece, Italy, Malta, Spain, Portugal, Yugoslavia, Hungary and Poland. These arrivals exerted a powerful influence on all aspects of Australian society and notably in popular music: many Australia pop and rock performers of the 1960s were migrants or their children. By mid-1957, inspired by Elvis Presley and Little Richard, Sydney-based singer Johnny O'Keefe achieved local acclaim after his breakthrough appearances on a Gordon-promoted tour by Haley. O'Keefe carved out a national profile to become a legend of Australian rock music. He hosted one of Australia's first TV rock shows, Six O'Clock Rock (1959 to 1961), and worked as an A&R with Gordon's label, Leedon. He was the first Australian rock 'n' roll performer to attempt to break into the US market. In early 1960 O'Keefe's 35 state US tour "made little impact" although his single, "It's too Late", charted locally in New Orleans. Iggy Pop covered O'Keefe's March 1958 Australian hit "Real Wild Child" in 1986. Pop re-recorded it in 2008 with the Australian band Jet. For a few years, O'Keefe and other local rockers including Lonnie Lee & the Leemen, Dig Richards & the R'Jays, Col Joye & the Joy Boys, Alan Dale & the Houserockers, Ray Hoff & the Off Beats, Digger Revell and the Denvermen and New Zealand's Johnny Devlin & the Devils whipped up excitement on a par with their US inspirations. In 1959, Lee Gordon would commission Lee Robinson to produce the first ever feature-length film of a Rock'n' Roll concert held at Sydney Stadium, entitled Rock'n'Roll. It is likely the only one of its kind in existence, and features a number of the aforementioned Australian artists.

In January 1960 Festival was purchased by rising media magnate Rupert Murdoch, and in April ARC was taken over by US-owned CBS, which closed the Coronet label and replaced the Australian CBS label. The success of the "first wave" rock 'n' roll acts was brief: by the early 1960s the first boom had begun to fade. Between O'Keefe's last major hit in 1961 and Billy Thorpe's first hit in 1964, the local rock music scene had become blander and more conservative. The charts were dominated by clean-cut acts, many were regular guests on TV pop show Bandstand (1958 to 1972) and toured as members of the "Bandstand family", most were signed to Festival. Bandstand explicitly "appealed to anyone from eight to eighty".

An alternative to mainstream pop acts were instrumental surf groups, for instance the Atlantics and the Denvermen in Sydney, and Melbourne's the Thunderbirds. Many of the players in these dance bands had come from the jazz scene, and were also influenced by R&B and jump music of performers like Louis Jordan. Others were inspired by US surf guitarists Dick Dale and Duane Eddy, or UK's the Shadows and US band the Ventures. The influence of the Shadows and their lead guitarist Hank Marvin on Australasian pop and rock music of the 1960s and 1970s is underrated. Australian instrumental bands played at dance venues in capital cities and regional towns. Like Australian jazz groups, these rock 'n' roll musicians became accomplished players. Dance patrons moved as couples to traditional rhythms, and bands played a wide variety of musical styles. One of the popular dance crazes of the era was "The Stomp". According to Digger Revell of the Denvermen "it was like what the Red Indians do when they're dancing around the teepee. I don't know where it came from but everyone was doing it at the time".

== 1964–1969: "Second wave" ==
=== Beat boom: pop, rock, and garage ===
During the second wave of Australian rock or "beat boom" from 1964 to 1969, there were hundreds of bands active, both live and in recording studios. The Beatles, and other British Invasion acts, had a massive impact on the local rock music scene. These bands toured to wild receptions from the mid-1960s. When The Beatles' June 1964 Australian tour arrived in Adelaide, an estimated 300,000 people—about one-third of the city's population at that time—turned out to see their motorcade from the airport to the city. The tours and recordings by British beat groups revitalised the pop and rock genres by inspiring scores of new and established groups, which quickly developed a vibrant and distinctive local inflection.

Bee Gees and The Easybeats are the best-known pop rock acts from this era which also gained success outside the country. Both groups consisted of members who had migrated from the UK and, in the case of the latter, from continental Europe. Bee Gees had formed in 1960 by the trio of singing Gibb brothers, who had migrated from UK two years earlier, created "impeccable three-part harmonies" in a pop and R&B style. In 1963 they signed with Leedon Records which issued their early singles from that year and their debut album, The Bee Gees Sing and Play 14 Barry Gibb Songs, in November 1965.

Their most successful Australian-based single, "Spicks and Specks", was issued in September 1966, which reached No. 4 on the Go-Set Australian National Top 40. By January of the next year they had returned to UK where they continued a very successful career both there and later, in the US. They also continued to chart well in Australia throughout the decade and beyond. Their first number-one hit on Go-Set National Top 40 is "Massachusetts" (December 1967).

The Easybeats had formed in late 1964 at Villawood Migrant Hostel (later called Villawood Detention Centre) in Sydney with all five founders being recent arrivals from Europe: Dick Diamonde (bass guitar) and Harry Vanda (lead guitar) were from Netherlands; Gordon "Snowy" Fleet (drums) and Stevie Wright (lead vocals) were from England; and George Young (rhythm guitar) was from Scotland. They adopted a Beatles-esque look, wearing "neat matching suits", and performed original beat pop songs, written initially by Wright and Young. They signed with Albert Productions and issued "a string of exceptional hit singles and undertaking hugely successful tours" throughout Australia.

The Easybeats' later material was primarily written by Vanda & Young, and by July 1966 they had relocated to the UK where they recorded "Friday on My Mind" (released in November). Meanwhile, also in that month, their earlier single, "Sorry", reached number one in Go-Set. In January of the next year "Friday on My Mind" had also peaked at number one in Go-Set. This single also had chart success in the UK (at No. 6), US (at No. 16), Netherlands (at No. 1) and Germany (at No. 10). Vanda & Young took over producing the group's releases and the group toured the US in August 1967. They had further hit singles in Australia but disbanded late in 1969 with Vanda & Young remaining in the UK until 1973.

Little Pattie (aka Patricia Amphlett) started as a surf pop singer with her debut single, "He's My Blonde Headed, Stompie Wompie, Real Gone Surfer Boy" (November 1963), reaching No. 2 on the Sydney singles chart in January 1964. Which cashed in on "The Stomp" dance craze and led to her being a regular on Bandstand. In August 1966, aged 17, she toured Vietnam to entertain troops during the Vietnam War—she was singing on stage when the Battle of Long Tan started nearby. She later recalled "During the third show I was given the sign, which of course is the fingers across the throat, which in show business means you better finish. We were very swiftly evacuated ... but I could see thousands and thousands of orange lights, which of course was the gunfire, and I'll never forget it. Never". In the days after the battle, Amphlett visited injured soldiers in hospital to comfort and sing to them.

Some of leading acts during this period are, Billy Thorpe & the Aztecs, Bobby & Laurie, Ray Brown & The Whispers, the Twilights, the Loved Ones, The Trend, the Masters Apprentices, MPD Ltd, Mike Furber & The Bowery Boys, Ray Columbus & The Invaders, Max Merritt, Dinah Lee, Normie Rowe, The Groop, the Groove, The Wild Colonials, Lynne Randell (who toured US supporting the Monkees and Jimi Hendrix), Johnny Young, John Farnham, Doug Parkinson, Russell Morris and Ronnie Burns. During the 1960s numerous New Zealand performers moved to Australia for wider commercial opportunities. Although their origins are often overlooked (in much the same way that Canadian performers such as Neil Young and Joni Mitchell are routinely classified as "American") these trans-Tasman acts—including Max Merritt, Mike Rudd, Dinah Lee, Ray Columbus, Bruno Lawrence, Dragon and Split Enz—have exerted a considerable influence on the local rock music.

While some groups, such as the Bee Gees, were more pop-oriented, by 1965 many other acts employed a harder, blues-based style, such as The Missing Links, Purple Hearts, Wild Cherries, The Trend, The Creatures, and the Throb. The garage rock and protopunk sound of these bands and others exerted a significant influence on later bands including The Saints. Australia experienced a garage rock explosion similar to the US and elsewhere.

=== Culture and music industry ===
A weekly magazine, Go-Set, was published from February 1966 to August 1974, and was aimed at teenagers and twenty-year-olds. It quickly became the most influential and popular music-related publication, which chronicled major events, trends, fads and performers in local pop and rock music. Regular columnists included radio DJ Stan Rofe, fashion designer Prue Acton, and music journalist Molly Meldrum. Go-Set published the first national singles charts from October 1966 (prior charts were state-based, or radio station listings). It detailed international musical developments and the exploits of Australian artists overseas including Normie Rowe and Lynne Randell. It reported on Australia's annual rock band competition, Hoadley's Battle of the Sounds, which ran from 1966 to 1972. From 1967 Go-Set conducted a popularity poll which led to the King of Pop Awards starting with Rowe as King of Pop in 1967. Australian-raised critic and journalist, Lillian Roxon, wrote her Rock Encyclopedia in 1969, which is the first such encyclopaedia to detail rock music and its creators.

As in other countries, independent record labels proliferated during this period. The local branch of the UK-owned EMI company had dominated the Australian record market since the 1920s, but in this period it faced increasing challenges from its rivals, including the Australian arm of the US label, CBS Records, and particularly from the Sydney-based Festival Records, a division of Rupert Murdoch's News Limited.

Festival had its own successful house label, and it also signed valuable distribution deals with independent labels of the 1960s, including Leedon Records (which released the earliest recordings by the Bee Gees), Spin Records and the Perth-based Clarion Records. The many hits released on these independent labels comprised a significant part of Festival's total turnover. Other important independent labels of this period included the Melbourne-based W&G Records, Astor Records—also a major distributor—and the short-lived Go!! Records label, which was set up in conjunction with a pop music TV series, The Go!! Show.

Labels and production companies began to play an increasingly important role in the local rock music industry with their allied recording facilities such as Armstrong Studios in Melbourne. Founded in 1965 it became highly sought-after and recorded many local hits. It was an important training ground for some of Australia's best engineers and record producers, Roger Savage and John L Sayers. An important independent production company was Albert Productions, which was established in 1964 by music executive, Ted Albert of J. Albert & Son, who had signed both Billy Thorpe, and The Easybeats. Two members of the latter group, Vanda & Young, started working as producers and songwriters at Alberts in 1967. Alberts also owned the leading Sydney AM pop radio station 2UW, along with several other lesser stations. Another such company was the Macquarie Radio Network. Albert Productions issued many major hits (released locally on EMI's Parlophone label) with both their flagship acts in the mid-1960s, and the associated record label, established in the early 1970s, became one of the most successful Australian labels of that decade. Other significant 'indie' production houses of the period included Leopold Productions (Max Merritt, The Allusions), set up Festival's original house producer Robert Iredale, and June Productions, led by former W&G and Astor staff producer, Ron Tudor, who went on to found Fable Records in 1970.

== 1970–1975: "Third wave" ==
Australian rock's third wave was from 1970 to 1975. During the late 1960s, many local acts dissolved or faded from view, while newer performers and surviving veterans of the 1960s beat boom coalesced into new formations and developed more distinctively Australian rock styles. However, acts that were successful within Australia rarely managed to achieve any lasting success overseas, generally due to the combination of poor management, lack of record company support or lack of radio exposure. The era also saw the popularity of local versions of rock musicals and festivals.

=== Early "Third wave" ===
Until the late 1970s, many Australian rock performers found it hard to become established and to maintain their profile, because of the difficulty in getting radio airplay. Until 1975, Australian mainstream radio was dominated by a clique of commercial broadcasters who virtually had the field to themselves and their influence over government was such that no new radio licences had been issued in any Australian capital city since the early 1930s. All commercial radio was broadcast on the AM band, in mono, and that sector strenuously resisted calls to grant new licences, introduce community broadcasting or open up the FM band (then only used for TV broadcasts) even though FM rock radio was already well-established in the US. Many of the more progressively oriented artists found themselves locked out of these radio stations, which concentrated on high-rotation of a small list of three-minute pop singles. This was a result of the widespread adoption of the US-inspired "More Music" format.

A conflict between radio broadcasters and record labels resulted in the 1970 radio ban from May to October. During the ban major UK and Australian releases were refused airplay on commercial radio—but not on Australian Broadcasting Commission stations. A series of cover versions of UK singles by local artists on new labels, including Fable Records, were commercially successful. This is exemplified by Liv Maessen's version of "Knock, Knock Who's There?", which reached No. 2 on Go-Set's National Top 40. However the original version by Mary Hopkin was not well known to contemporary listeners. After the ban even though there was a great deal of innovative and exciting music created by Australians; few listeners heard more than a fraction of it. By the 2000s their music underwent a resurgence of interest, both locally and internationally, as the country was one of the last untapped sources of 20th-century rock music.

Popular rock music acts of this period include Spectrum and its successor Ariel, Daddy Cool, Blackfeather, The Flying Circus, Tully, Tamam Shud, Russell Morris, Jeff St John & Copperwine, Chain, Billy Thorpe & the Aztecs, Headband, Company Caine, Kahvas Jute, Country Radio, Max Merritt & the Meteors, the La De Da's, Madder Lake, Stevie Wright (ex-The Easybeats), Wendy Saddington, Ayers Rock, The Captain Matchbox Whoopee Band and The Dingoes.

Guitarist-songwriter-producer Lobby Loyde (ex Wild Cherries, Purple Hearts) was another key figure, including with his band, Coloured Balls (1972–74), which gained a considerable following, despite media allegations that their music promoted violence by sharpie gangs (an Australian youth subculture). Loyde played an important part in the re-emergence of Billy Thorpe in his new hard-rock incarnation of the Aztecs. Loyde's solo and band recordings in this period had a significant impact in Australia and internationally; Henry Rollins and Nirvana's Kurt Cobain are among those who cited Loyde as an influence.

Rock musicals were an important development at this time. The local production of Hair brought future "Queen of Pop" Marcia Hines to Australia in 1970. In 1972 a commercially successful and critically praised Sydney production of Jesus Christ Superstar premiered, which included Hines, Jon English, Reg Livermore, two future members of Air Supply, Stevie Wright, John Paul Young and Rory O'Donoghue. It was directed by Jim Sharman, who had international success as the director of both the original stage production and the film version of The Rocky Horror Show.

Alongside the more obscure acts was a raft of successful pop-oriented groups and solo artists, including Sherbet, Hush, Ted Mulry Gang (TMG) and John Paul Young, who became the first Australian performer to have a major hit in multiple international markets with his perennial track, "Love Is in the Air" (1978)—a song which was written and produced by Vanda & Young, who were behind many of the big hits of the mid-to-late Seventies. The tail-end of the second wave gave birth to Skyhooks, who bridged the transition from the third wave into the period of new wave music acts of the late 1970s and early 1980s. On the Australian charts Sherbet had "20 consecutive hit singles to its credit", while Skyhooks had two number-one albums, Living in the 70's (October 1974, 226000 copies sold) and Ego Is Not a Dirty Word (July 1975, 210000 copies sold). Both acts toured the US but had limited success there, although Sherbet had chart success with their single, "Howzat" (1976), in Europe.

The early 1970s also witnessed the first major rock festivals in Australia, which were closely modelled on the fabled Woodstock festival of 1969. The festival era was exemplified by the annual Sunbury music festival, held outside Melbourne, Victoria each January from 1972 to 1975. Although there were numerous other smaller festivals, most were not successful and failed to have the lasting impact of Sunbury. After the disastrous 1975 Sunbury festival, which sent the promoters broke, large-scale festivals were considered too risky and were only occasionally staged in Australia until the advent of the annual Big Day Out in the 1990s.

Also paralleling a US trend was the beginning of an Australian Christian music culture. One of the first examples of this trend was the surprise success of singing nun Sister Janet Mead whose 'rock' arrangement of The Lord's Prayer was a major hit in Australia and the US and earned a gold record award in the US. Bands like Family in Brisbane, and Kindekrist in Adelaide, started performing. Rod Boucher formed Good God Studios, which recorded a range of alternative Christian artists. Following on these foundations, later artists such as Newsboys had significant popular success.

Two important changes which had a dramatic effect on the rock scene were the long-overdue introduction of colour television and FM radio in 1975. This period also saw the decline of the booming local dance and discothèque circuit that had flourished in the 1960s and early 1970s. These rock dances were a continuation of the social dance circuit that had thrived in Australia's cities and suburbs since the 19th century, and they were hugely popular from the late Fifties to the early Seventies, but they gradually faded in the early Seventies as the "Baby Boomer" generation grew into adulthood and changes to licensing laws saw pubs take on an increasingly important role as venues for live music.

From the 1950s to the early 1970s, the main venues for live music were discothèques (usually located in inner city areas), church, municipal and community halls, Police Boys' Clubs and beachside surf clubs. Bigger concerts and international tours were usually staged in the few large-size venues, such as the Sydney Stadium (originally built as a boxing arena), the Sydney Trocadero, and Brisbane and Melbourne Festival Halls. Such venues regularly attracted large numbers of young people because they were supervised, all-ages events—Australia's restrictive liquor licensing laws of the period meant that these venues and dances were almost always alcohol-free.

According to rock historian Glenn A. Baker, in 1965 there were up to 100 dances being held every weekend in and around Melbourne alone. The most popular groups frequently played almost every night of the week, commonly commuting around town, performing short sets at three or more different dances every night. It was a very lucrative circuit for musicians and even moderately popular acts could easily earn considerably more than the average weekly wage at that time.

The decline of the local dance circuit, combined with the fact that the baby boom teenagers of the Sixties were now ageing into adulthood, led to the rise of a thriving new city and suburban pub music circuit in the mid-1970s, which in turn spawned a new generation of bands who cut their teeth in this often tough but formative training ground.

=== 1974: Countdown ===
Teen-oriented pop music still enjoyed strong popularity during the 1970s, although much of it was sourced from overseas, and the proportion of Australian acts in the charts had hit an all-time low by 1973. That trend began to change around 1975, thanks largely to the advent of a new weekly TV pop show, Countdown, in late 1974. It gained a huge audience and soon exerted a strong influence on radio programmers, because it was broadcast nationwide on Australia's government-owned broadcaster, the Australian Broadcasting Corporation (ABC). Countdown was one of the most popular music programs in Australian TV history, and it had a marked effect on radio because of its loyal national audience—and the amount of Australian content it featured.

The most important feature of Countdown was that it became a critical new interface between the record industry and radio. By the late 1970s, radio programmers ignored Countdown's hit picks at their peril. Host Molly Meldrum also frequently used the show to castigate local radio for its lack of support for Australian music. Unlike commercial TV or radio, Countdown was not answerable to advertisers or sponsors, and (in theory) it was far less susceptible to influence from record companies. Like no other ABC program before or since, it openly and actively promoted the products of these private companies. Countdown was crucial to the success of acts like John Paul Young, Sherbet, Skyhooks, Dragon and Split Enz, and it dominated Australian popular music well into the 1980s stimulating domestic demand for Australian pop and rock, with quality varying in extremes of good and bad.

=== 1975: Establishment of Double Jay ===
Double Jay banner

In the long term, one of the most important changes to the Australian music industry in the 1970s (and beyond) turned out to be the founding of the ABC's first all-rock radio station, Double Jay (2JJ) in Sydney in January 1975. It is indicative of the conservative nature of the Australian media and its regulators that Double Jay was the first new radio licence issued in an Australian capital city in more than 40 years. It was also Australia's first non-commercial 24-hour rock station, and the first to employ women disc jockeys.

Double-Jay's wide-ranging programming policies were influenced by British 1960s pirate radio, the early programming of BBC Radio One, and the American album-oriented rock (AOR) format. The new station opened up the airwaves to a vast amount of new local music, introduced listeners to important overseas innovations like reggae, dub, progressive rock, punk and new wave music that had been largely ignored by commercial radio. Double Jay also featured an unprecedented level of Australian content, and presented regular live concert broadcasts, comedy, controversial documentaries and innovative radiophonic features.

Double-Jay quickly made a significant mark on the ratings in its target age group, Its major commercial competitor was Sydney's 2SM (then Australia's top rating and most profitable pop station). The radio broadcaster had some synergies with the more pop oriented Countdown television show, also owned by the ABC. Double Jay/Triple-J has influenced Australia's taste in rock music, and it has been a testing ground for many acts that were later played by commercial radio stations after becoming popular with the J's audience.

== Late 1970s ==
The advent of Double J and Countdown fundamentally changed the economy of Australian popular music, and the pub circuit gave rise to a newer generation of tough, uncompromising, adult-oriented rock bands.

One of the most popular Australian groups to emerge in this period was the classic Australian pub rock band Cold Chisel, which formed in Adelaide in 1973 and enjoyed tremendous success in Australia in the late 1970s and early 1980s, although they never managed to break into other countries.

Other popular acts from this transitional period include AC/DC, Skyhooks, Richard Clapton, Ol' 55, Jon English, Jo Jo Zep & The Falcons, The Angels, The Sports, Midnight Oil, The Radiators, Australian Crawl, Dragon, Rose Tattoo, Ross Wilson's Mondo Rock, acclaimed soul singers Marcia Hines and Renée Geyer and pioneering Australian punk/new wave acts The Saints (Mk I) and Radio Birdman. The band Sebastian Hardie became known as the first Australian symphonic rock band in the mid-1970s, with the release of their debut Four Moments.

Three "Australian" acts that appeared towards the end of the Second Wave—AC/DC, Little River Band, and Split Enz—and continued into the late 1970s and early 1980s achieved the long sought-after international success that took Australasian rock onto the world stage.

The progression of the Australian independent scene from the late seventies until the early nineties is chronicled in Stranded: The Secret History of Australian Independent Music 1977–1991 (Pan Macmillan, 1996) by author and music journalist Clinton Walker.

Australia's main contribution to the development of punk rock, (not including sixties garage rock bands), consists of The Saints and Radio Birdman.

=== AC/DC ===
AC/DC started as a pub rock group in November 1973 and became one of the most well-known Australian rock bands, with more than 71 million sales in the US alone by 2014. They are widely considered the most well-known rock group from Australia, despite the fact that only one of the current band members is actually Australian-born. They have sold over 200 million albums, and toured in every major continent but Africa.

From their humble beginnings, Scottish brothers Angus and Malcolm Young forged a hard-hitting pub guitar sound, similar to Alex Harvey but tougher. After Bon Scott joined the band, the band shot to the top of the Australian rock scene in 1974–75 with their song "It's a Long Way to the Top (If You Wanna Rock 'n' Roll)". The band later achieved international success, especially with the release of their album Highway to Hell. This was to be Scott's last album. During the subsequent tour, he was discovered in the backseat of a friend's car, having died of alcohol poisoning.

The band found a new singer in English-born Brian Johnson and released their next album, Back in Black, in the early 1980s. The U.S. took notice of the band with the song You Shook Me All Night Long, and the album of the same name became one of the best-selling albums by a band ever, selling over 22 million copies in the U.S. and 42 million copies around the world.

AC/DC are credited as a seminal influence by scores of leading hard rock and heavy metal music acts, also rated the fifth-biggest selling group in U.S. recording history, with total sales of over 100 million records.

=== Little River Band ===
Another highly popular and lucrative band of this period is the soft-rock-harmony group Little River Band (LRB). Resurrected from an earlier band called Mississippi, LRB centred on a trio of seasoned veterans. Lead singer Glenn Shorrock had fronted Australian 1960s pop idols The Twilights and singer-guitarists Beeb Birtles and Graeham Goble had been the core members of Mississippi; prior to that, Birtles had played bass in chart-topping Australian 1960s pop group Zoot whose former lead guitarist Rick Springfield also became a solo star in the US.

Under the guidance of manager Glenn Wheatley (former bassist in The Masters Apprentices, one of the top Australian bands of the Sixties) LRB became the first Australian band to achieve major ongoing chart and sales success in the United States. They achieved huge success in the late 1970s and early 1980s and their single "Reminiscing" now ranks as one of the most frequently played singles in American radio history.

=== 1970s and 1980s: Indie, punk, post-punk, and early Australian electronica ===
Other developments starting from the mid-1970s were the appearance of early electronica, as opposed to electronic music, as Percy Grainger had invented some obscure electronic instruments earlier, and Rolf Harris was famously associated with the Stylophone. The most notable of early electronica were Cybotron, Sydney's Severed Heads and Melbourne's Laughing Hands and Essendon Airport who began to experiment with tape loops and synthesisers, but did not rise to prominence until the 1980s. Electronica had existed in the Australian classical music scene with David Ahern in the late 1960s. By the late 1990s Severed Heads were signed to the influential label Nettwerk records. Single Gun Theory had been with Nettwerk since 1987. The pop band Mi-Sex scored a major hit with the single "Computer Games" in 1980, which was one of the first Australian pop recordings to employ sequenced synthesiser backings. In 1980 producer Mark Moffatt pioneered dance technology by becoming the first in the world to use a Roland 808 rhythm composer and MC 4 digital sequencer on record with his studio project The Monitors. (exactly the same type of equipment had been in use around the world however, simply manufactured by other brands. The 808 of the time bore little resemblance to its later sample playback incarnations, machines whose capabilities were more like that of the Fairlight CMI series 1 and Synclavier)

Following the punk movement several influential bands of this post-punk era were The Birthday Party, led by Nick Cave, Foetus, The Celibate Rifles, The Go-Betweens, SPK, Dead Can Dance, These Immortal Souls, Crime & the City Solution, No, Louis Tillett, Laughing Clowns, Kim Salmon and the Surrealists, Beasts of Bourbon.

== 1980s ==
While many Australasian bands from the 1980s remained cult acts outside of Australia, some, including Little River Band, Men at Work, AC/DC, INXS, Midnight Oil, and later Crowded House and Electric Pandas found wide success throughout the decade. Groups with international hit singles included Real Life with "Catch Me I'm Falling", "Send Me an Angel", Divinyls with "Pleasure and Pain", Big Pig with "Breakaway" and Rick Springfield with "Jessie's Girl". Moving Pictures had a hit album with Days of Innocence. Jimmy Barnes and Michael Hutchence performed "Good Times" a song by the Australian songwriting duo Vanda & Young and it was included on The Lost Boys soundtrack. Expatriate Mike Chapman continued his career as a prominent record producer and co-wrote "Mickey" which became a major hit when Toni Basil performed it.

=== Baby boomer acts ===
The 1980s was a boom period for acts whose members were usually born between 1946 and 1964 (baby boomers); this includes occasionally critically praised, popular acts such as The Party Boys, James Reyne, Models, Sunnyboys, Hunters & Collectors, Machinations, Johnny Diesel, Matt Finish, Hoodoo Gurus, Chantoozies, The Dugites, The Numbers, The Swingers, Spy Vs Spy, Eurogliders, Mental As Anything, Boom Crash Opera, I'm Talking, Do Ré Mi, Rockmelons, Stephen Cummings, The Reels, The Stems, Paul Kelly, Nick Barker, Jenny Morris, The Triffids, The Choirboys, Icehouse, Redgum, Goanna, 1927, Max Q, Noiseworks, GANGgajang, The Black Sorrows and The Zorros.

The mainstream taste was to tap into the "classic" Fifties rock look, with a contemporary touch, while alternative rockers were often identifiable for sixties and seventies retro. At this time Goth fashion was very unusual and heavily applied black mascara was the sign of a deeply troubled person.

Many of these acts often topped the Australian charts but never gained international success. One notable exception was Joe Dolce who moved to Australia in 1979 from the US. His Australian Number One Shaddap You Face was Number One in the UK and fifteen other countries, selling over six million copies internationally and achieving the before unheard of sales of nine times platinum in Australia. There was no music industry award at that time to acknowledge sales of this magnitude so the Victorian Premier Sir Rupert Hamer presented Dolce with a specially made perspex-framed album cover and the Advance Australia Award. This Mainstream Australian rock of the eighties was generally uncontroversial with the exception of Kylie Minogue for her limited vocal range, Christina Amphlett and Ecco Homo, who were deemed by some to be too sexually provocative and Yothu Yindi's "Treaty", which was objected to by some because a white person Paul Kelly co-wrote it. Nick Cave was not famous in Australia until Triple J Radio became a nationwide, prominent broadcaster. Audiences who went to The Angels' gig were famous for their good humoured response "No way, get fucked, fuck off!" to the lead singer's lyric "Am I ever going to see your face again?".

=== Mainstream acts ===
Mainstream acts such as singer John Farnham, Daryl Braithwaite and Jimmy Barnes were very successful for many years within Australia, but remain largely unknown outside the country. Farnham's commercial comeback was one of the biggest success stories in Australian music in that decade, the former "King of Pop" spent years out of favour with the public and the industry, often reduced to working in suburban clubs, but he returned in 1986 with the album Whispering Jack, which became the biggest-selling album of that year and remains one of the biggest selling Australian records. His manager was Glenn Wheatley, former manager of Little River Band.

Renowned artists such as singer-songwriter Paul Kelly and his band The Coloured Girls (renamed The Messengers for America), ambient-rock-crossover act Not Drowning, Waving and Aboriginal-band Yothu Yindi drew inspiration from distinctly Australian concerns, particularly from the land, and they were critically well received within Australia, and also found international listeners.

One noteworthy group in this decade was the pioneering Aboriginal group Warumpi Band from the Northern Territory, whose landmark single "Jailanguru Pakarnu (Out from Jail)" was the first rock single ever recorded in an Aboriginal language. Triple J was the cutting edge radio station of the time and was instrumental in bringing this band to public attention, as were Midnight Oil, who took the group on national tours with them. Their classic 1987 single "My Island Home" was successfully covered by Christine Anu in the 1990s. Another memorable song of the Aboriginal rock scene is "Black Boy" by Coloured Stone.

=== Darkwave ===
Critically acclaimed acts like The Church, Cosmic Psychos, the darkwave-world music group Dead Can Dance, Hunters & Collectors, Scribble, The Moodists, The Deadly Hume, the Wreckery, the second incarnation of The Saints, Laughing Clowns, The Go-Betweens and a new band formed by Nick Cave and Mick Harvey, Nick Cave and the Bad Seeds, developed consistent followings in Europe and other regions. Nick Cave and the Bad Seeds and the side project Honeymoon in Red were heavy on the pop cultural references to cult favourites like Johnny Cash and Saul Bass and lurid pulp fiction. From the late seventies to the late eighties there was also a lively Australian post-punk scene which was made up of bands that showed obvious influences of bands such as Tangerine Dream, Wire, The Cure, Siouxsie and the Banshees and Suicide. J. G. Thirlwell, whose influential Foetus, began life in Melbourne before moving to London and the US. Of the early Australian electronica scene just a few truly memorable recordings emerged, for example "Lamborghini" by Severed Heads, "Pony Club" by The Limp "The Pilot Reads Crosswords" by Scattered Order and the electronica of Hugo Klang. The Makers of the Dead Travel Fast and Nick Cave and the Bad Seeds were precursors of postrock. SPK was a sinister industrial band in the early 1980s and they surprised many of their fans by reinventing themselves as a fashion friendly synthpop group in the mid-1980s. SPK's sound was unlike the chilly asexual minimalism of many little known experimental bands of the time. Australian Crawl, a chart topping rock group, dabbled in minimalist composition with "Reckless", using a very simple bassline and voice, without alienating their established audience.

The use of violin was unusual in Australian rock bands, however, three who did include it were Box the Jesuit, Crime & the City Solution and Sidewinder, with classically trained Richard Lee, later with Dragon, on that instrument.

=== Garage rock revivalists ===
Detroit rock influenced bands such as the Celibate Rifles, The Scientists, Lime Spiders and The Hitmen would serve as precursors to the garage rock revival of the 1980s and the grunge scene to follow. From the bass heavy "I Don't Wanna Go Out" by X in 1979 and throughout the eighties the Australian indie rock scene produced hook driven melodic songs with heavy guitar and bass backing. Examples are Johnny Teen and The Broken Hearts "I Like It Both Ways", "I Lied" by The Pony, Too Much Acid by The Pineapples from the Dawn of Time, Chewin' by Space Juniors, These Immortal Souls' "Blood and Sand, She Said" and The Scientists' "Swampland". Some bands had a foot in both the mainstream and alternative scenes, for example, The Johnnys, Hunters & Collectors, Hoodoo Gurus, TISM, Painters and Dockers. In 1989 the group No released "Once We Were Scum, Now We Are God", an Ep that was in parts as hard rock as The Cult, despite No being generally perceived as an "underground" band.

Noise rock acts included Lubricated Goat and People With Chairs Up Their Noses. Some of the louche pub rock names of the time were People With Chairs Up Their Noses, Free Beer, Shower Scene From Psycho, Thug, No More Bandicoots and Nyuk Nyuk Nyuck.

The Mark of Cain, one of the better and more consistently hard rock bands of the decade, formed in Adelaide between 1984 and 1985.

The decade also saw perhaps the most concerted examination of the routine and everyday aspects of suburban and inner-city life since perhaps The Executives 1960s classic "Summer Hill Road." This approach was explored not only by Paul Kelly and the Coloured Girls (in songs like "From St Kilda to Kings Cross" and "Leaps and Bounds") but also by The Little Heroes (e.g. "Melbourne is Not New York"), John Kennedy's Love Gone Wrong e.g. "King Street" and The Mexican Spitfires e.g. "Sydney Town" and "Town Hall Steps."

Hong Kong's Leslie Cheung covered Big Pig's "Breakaway" in 1989, in this decade, one of the rare instances of a popular overseas artist covering a song by a popular Australian band (other than AC/DC).

Iconic music festivals of the decade included the Narara Music Festival, Australian Made and Turn Back the Tide at Bondi.

== 1990s: Ravers and alternative rockers ==
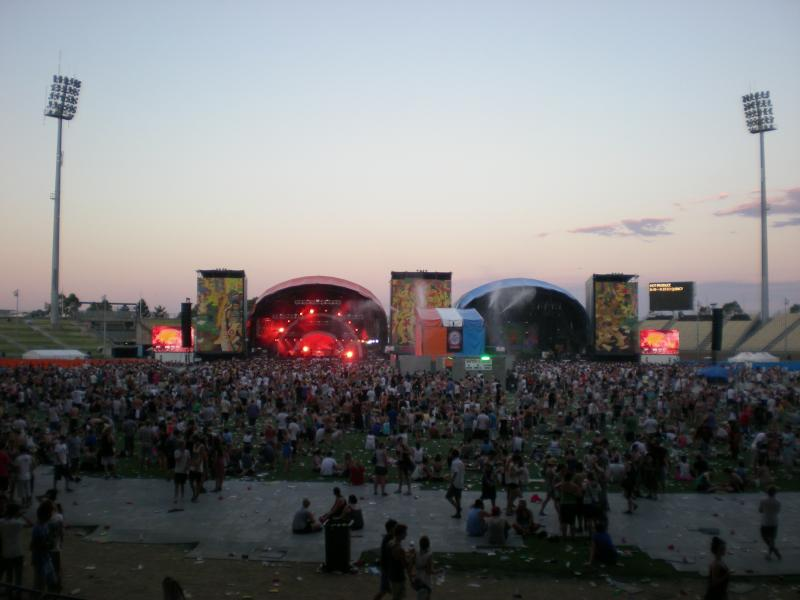
The Big Day Out in Sydney, 2010

In 1990, Boxcar released their first album, Vertigo. Central Station Records in Sydney was one of the leading retailers of dance music. The Sydney street press became half and half dance music and rock.

Highlights in rock from people of ATSI background were Archie Roach's Took the Children Away, Christine Anu's Party and her version of My Island Home and Yothu Yindi's World Turning.

Fans of early punk band The Saints were excited when Ed Kuepper reunited with members of The Saints and played and recorded as The Aints. Kuepper was at the time receiving praise from the critics for his album Today Wonder, that featured simply Kuepper singing and on guitar and Mark Dawson on drums.

In 1991, the band Necrotomy played live on the Peter Couchman talk show special Couchman on Heavy Metal during a period of media controversy about heavy metal music. ( Metal as a form of music around the world underwent a massive stylistic evolution after this, with the emergence of many new styles such as black, doom, melodeath etc. in which Australian bands such as Alchemy, Armoured Angel, Abominator, Lord chaos, to name a very few, played and are still playing, a part in.)

Another acoustic act of the late nineties was Machine Translations.

The nineties was famous for not only grunge but also eclecticism with Machine Gun Fellatio and Def FX being popular cross-genre acts.

Gerling, an alternative rock and electronica band, formed in 1993, as was the pop–punk band Noise Addict featuring Ben Lee, who went on to be a prominent singer and songwriter into the following decade.

Peril was an attempt to make the self-styled avant garde music of the Tzadik Records label.

Musicians and music fans of the nineties tended to be less nostalgic for pre-punk rock compared to those of previous decade. The Cruel Sea and Divinyls were exceptions, showing the influence of the music of the sixties. Dave Graney and TISM continued to be popular with their irreverent commentary on contemporary culture.

Baby Animals released their eponymous debut album in 1991, which was briefly successful.

The Screaming Jets was a popular hard rock act from Newcastle. Having a down to earth image, they and Divinyls were examples of bands that survived the backlash against so called Hair Rock of the Eighties. In 1993, the Melbourne rock band Horsehead also gained popularity after garnering interest internationally from Madonna's Maverick Records and had a hit single 'Liar' reaching the weekly top 40 ARIA charts and was performed televised on MTV's 'Take 40 Australia'. The band stylistically shared affinities with the huge American grunge scene at the time, drawing from the likes of Soundgarden and Alice in Chains. The band also had a second hit single and video 'Oil and Water' which won the Australian Kerrang! award for best rock video. Their debut album was mixed by the legendary Mike Fraser. In 1994, hard rock band The Poor charted at #30 in the Billboard Hot Mainstream Rock Tracks with "More Wine Waiter Please". The Candy Harlots' 1990 Foreplay EP reached 17 in the ARIA national Top 100 chart.

Paul Capsis was one of the few rock acts to work with a theatre director, Barrie Kosky.

Killing Heidi had a hit song with 'Mascara' in 1999.

Raja Ram was one half of Shpongle and their debut album in 1999 was Are You Shpongled?.

Roots music continued to have a strong appeal, with acts such as Blues band Bondi Cigars and Zydeco band Psycho Zydeco.

The comedy quiz show Good News Week was regularly signed off with Paul McDermott singing his rendition of Hunters & Collectors' "Throw Your Arms Around Me".

=== Alternative rock ===
Throughout the developed world, alternative rock of various kinds became more popular during the 1990s, especially grunge. As in other countries, independent music festivals also saw a resurgence in popularity, notably the Big Day Out (which began in Sydney in 1992) attracted and helped build the careers of many Australian acts as well as showcasing international artists to a local audience, and the Woodford Folk Festival, attracting large crowds in South Eastern Queensland.

Notable Australian independent acts of the time included the Falling Joys from Canberra; Christine Anu from Cairns, Queensland; Diana Anaid from Nimbin; Magic Dirt from Geelong, Tumbleweed from Wollongong; The Superjesus from Adelaide; Regurgitator, Powderfinger, Screamfeeder, The Sallyanne Atkinson Hate Squad and Custard from Brisbane; Something for Kate, The Living End, Dirty Three, The Paradise Motel, Rebecca's Empire, Bodyjar and The Meanies from Melbourne; Jebediah, Ammonia and The Blackeyed Susans from Perth, RatCat, The Clouds, You Am I, Vicious Hairy Mary, Caligula, The Whitlams, Bughouse, The Crystal Set, The Cruel Sea, Crow, Nitocris, Front End Loader, Skulker, Frenzal Rhomb, and Pollyanna from Sydney; Spiderbait from Finley, New South Wales and Silverchair, who began as a teenage combo in Newcastle, were discovered by Triple-J and have since become one of the most successful Australian bands of all time. The changes brought about in this period and the aforementioned bands are discussed in the book The Sell-In by music journalist Craig Mathieson.

Frank Bennett covered many of the fashionable alternative rock bands in big band mode. His version of Radiohead's "Creep" was his most well known recording, which was listed in the Triple J Hottest 100, 1996 and earned him two Aria Award nominations in 1997, one for Breakthrough Artist – Single and the other for Best New Talent. His music was less danceable than overseas Retro swing acts Big Bad Voodoo Daddy and Brian Setzer Orchestra. Frank Bennett was deeply ironic and had only moderate success with audiences who were attracted to the romanticised Harry Connick, Jr. Music in the style of Frank Sinatra and Tony Bennett was unfashionable in the Alternative rock scene, stigmatised by the derisive term Lounge Lizard. Nevertheless, Frank Bennett's follow-up album Cash Landing with a full orchestra, still earned him another ARIA Award nomination, this time for Best Adult Contemporary Album. Singers Dave Graney, Tex Perkins and Nick Cave and the Bad Seeds (particularly for their album The Good Son), also drew on the styles. By the end of the decade there was renewed interest in Lounge music from elements of the club scene, the interest being in both the composition and the campness.

== 2000s–2010s ==
Triple J's Come Together festival

Several Australian rock bands saw international success in Europe and the US. Notable examples include The Vines, who rose to prominence in the UK before becoming known in Australia, and Jet. Jet, influenced by seminal 1960s acts such as the Beatles and the Rolling Stones, had their single "Are You Gonna Be My Girl" used in an Apple iPod commercial, and consequently have sold 3 million copies in the US alone. Another band which had great success is Wolfmother, a hard rock band, very influenced by 1960s/1970s psychedelic rock and heavy metal bands, like Black Sabbath. In 2007, Wolfmother were awarded a Grammy for best hard rock performance for their extremely successful single "Woman".

Apart from those bands which achieved international success, one of the well known Australian rock bands of the first decade of the 21st century was Grinspoon. They first achieved success in the music industry in 1995 after being Unearthed by Triple J, and have been a mainstay of festivals such as the Big Day Out ever since.

During the early 2000s, several Australian alternative acts, including Little Birdy and Love Outside Andromeda, gained prominence. Following the commercial success of Missy Higgins, artists such as Sarah Blasko established expanded audiences within the domestic market.

There has also been an abundance of modern rock bands who have been influenced by the alternative and progressive scenes. Bands like The Butterfly Effect, Karnivool, Mammal and Cog have all seen success, with Karnivool probably gaining the most international attention.

=== Roots music and indie ===
Domestically, roots music, seemingly a catch-all term for somewhat more laid-back acoustic music covering blues, country and folk influences, came to some prominence, including Geoffrey Gurrumul Yunupingu, The John Butler Trio, and the plaintive harmonies of The Waifs. A number of "blues and roots" festivals have sprung up and are attracting large audiences.

As well as these uniquely "Aussie Bands", the mainstreaming of alternative music led to a shift of focus in indie rock in the 2000s. Post-rock indie band Art of Fighting, recorded their debut full-length album, Wires, in 2001. The album was successful and went on to win an ARIA award for Best Alternative Release. 2005 in particular sparked many brand new Australian "indie rock" bands such as End of Fashion who won ARIA awards for their debut self-titled album and hit song "Oh Yeah" (as well as performing at the Homebake festival and appearing on talk show Rove Live several times). There is also Kisschasy who appeared in concert on 2 October 2005 with teen favourite Simple Plan. Another band to appear on the scene at this time were John Smith Quintet wielding their new brand of funk onto the Australian charts and music scene. Melbourne indie rock artist Gotye achieved considerable domestic and international success in 2011–12.

=== Hardcore punk ===
Australian hardcore punk is an active rock music subgenre with a dedicated following. Many bands never tour outside their home state but enjoy a relatively large local fanbase. Recorded material of their work may be hard to acquire as live shows are the mainstay of the scene.

The Do-It-Yourself (DIY) ethic is strong with local distributors and small record labels active in most capital cities. Unlike the United States relatively few bands are straight edge or influenced by particular political views or religious convictions.

The strong sense of DIY ethics supported by independent street press and community radio stations mostly in Brisbane, Melbourne and Perth forms a breeding ground for creative artists who wish to explore the audio spectrum, as seen in Sticky Carpet rockumentary of Melbourne music scene.

In recent years, Australian hardcore bands have been growing in fanbase and success, the most notable being Byron Bay's Parkway Drive signing to American punk/hardcore record label Epitaph Records.

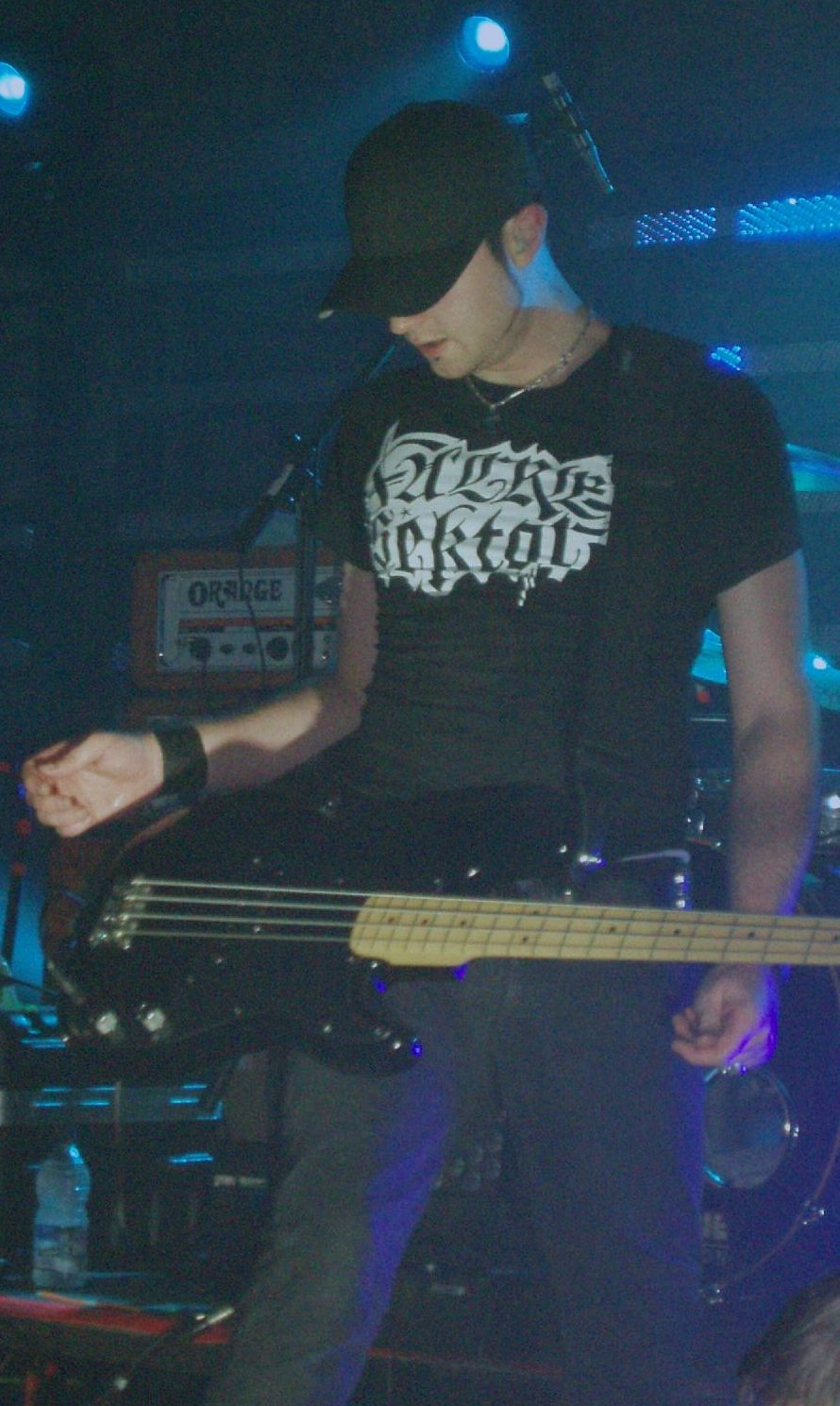
Pendulum bassist Gareth McGrillen. The band mixes numerous genres, including electronic.

The first popular Australian rock song to resemble contemporary dance music was the funky The Real Thing (1969) by Russell Morris. The high beats per minute blip of mainstream Electronic music in Australia appeared in the early 1980s with Severed Heads' Lamborghini. Severed Heads formed in 1979 and were the first electronic group to play the Big Day Out. The band achieved long-term success, winning an ARIA Award in 2005 for "Best Original Soundtrack" for The Illustrated Family Doctor, where lead singer Tom Ellard said the band would never fit into mainstream music.

=== Electronic rock ===
Traditional rock bands such as Regurgitator have developed an original sound by combining heavy guitars and electronic influences, and rock-electro groups, most notably Rogue Traders, have become popular with mainstream audiences. However, Cyclic Defrost, the only specialist electronic music magazine in Australia, was started in Sydney (in 1998) and is still based there. Radio still lags somewhat behind the success of the genre—producer and artist manager Andrew Penhallow told Australian Music Online that "the local music media have often overlooked the fact that this genre has been flying the flag for Australian music overseas".

In the late 2000s and early 2010s indie-electronic, indietronica and synthpop music rose in popularity, with Cut Copy, and Midnight Juggernauts being notable Australian exports and touring internationally.

=== Neo-psychedelic ===
Since the mid to late 2000s, the popularity of psychedelic rock music in Australia has been steadily climbing due in part to the worldwide success of Perth band, Tame Impala. The neo-psychedelic scene in Australia is inspired by the experimental psychedelic pop of Pink Floyd the jangly guitar-driven sound of The Byrds, the distorted free form jams, and the sonic experiments of 60s psychedelic bands. To bring the style into the 21st Century, Australian Psychedelic music carefully blends these elements along with Electronic Music, Shoegaze, Hip Hop and a multitude other genres that have come to prominence since the 60s. Rather than being propelled by song lyrics, the edginess of the scene comes from the music which relies heavily on the use of effects including tape delays, phasers, sitars, fuzz boxes, and pitch modulators.

Generally, the lyrical content differs from early psychedelic music which focused mostly on absurdity and drug use. Although there's still references to those subjects, the lyrics dial in on the issues introspection, paradox, identity, and isolation. The vocal melodies tend to weave together with the music to create a wall of sound as opposed to prominent, melodic lines. The main point in modern psychedelic music is to make listeners feel as if they have transcended into a dream-like state, solely through attentive listening to the music.

Perth is where a majority of bands in the psychedelic boom are coming from. Bands from Perth such as, Tame Impala, Pond, Mink Mussel Creek, Gum, and Allbrook/Avery share members, making the scene in Perth almost as if it were one big band. Spinning Top Music manages these bands as well as running press and social media. The dynamic of the Perth bands tends to be more cerebral and pop oriented than the raucous, tripped out rock by the likes of Wolfmother from Sydney or King Gizzard and the Lizard Wizard from Melbourne

It's mainly two record labels, Modular Recordings and Flightless who have been signing and promoting most of these bands. Promotion of these bands is focused mostly on regions outside of Australia with some of the biggest audiences being the US, the UK, and Mexico. Australian independent radio station, Triple J has also helped propel a multitude of these bands to garner a worldwide audience, with YouTube videos, articles, and airtime. Australia itself has a large number of music festivals that cater to the psychedelic, as well as other alternative music, scene. These include Big Day Out, Sydney Psych Festival, Come Together Music Festival, Pyramid Rock Festival, among others.

== See also ==
- Australian rock music films
- Aboriginal rock
- Australian indie rock
- Pub rock (Australia)
