= Picture a Hum, Can't Hear a Sound =

Picture a Hum Can't Hear a Sound

Studio album by 78 Saab
- Released: 2000
- Recorded: Hothouse Studio, St Kilda, December 1999—January 2000
- Genre: Rock
- Length: 53:16
- Label: Ivy League Records
- Producer: Greg Wales, 78 Saab, Tim Whitten

78 Saab chronology
Picture a Hum Can't Hear a Sound (2000)	Crossed Lines (2004)

Professional ratings
Review scores
Source	Rating
Sydney Morning Herald	3.5/5 stars

Picture a Hum Can't Hear a Sound is the debut album by Australian rock band 78 Saab, released in 2000.

Recording of the album followed their collaboration with Powderfinger producer Tim Whitten for the single "Sunshine", which won heavy rotation on the Triple J radio network. Indie guitar producer Greg Wales was called in to record their debut album, which songwriter Ben Nash described as a mixed tapestry of rural and urban imagery. "The album came together in its own time," he said. "So many bands rush to get that first album out, then peter off and fall away. We love the idea of the classic album."

The Age described the album as "the type of melodic, guitar-based pop that commercial radio programmers just don't want to know about" and praised the inclusion of "Sunshine" which it described as an "ethereal chunk of psychedelia". It said: "Producer Greg Wales, best known for his work with Melbourne's Snout, gives it all a healthy sonic sheen, preserving the band's full throttle approach while enhancing the material's melodic strengths."

== Track listing ==
(all songs by Ben Nash and 78 Saab)

1. "Iris-Ann" — 1:03
2. "Smile" — 3:30
3. "Sunshine" — 5:13
4. "Karma Package Deal" — 3:57
5. "Tetanus" — 5:11
6. "Jack Frost" — 3:36
7. "Don't Know Much" — 5:16
8. "Green Moon Rise" — 3:16
9. "Left It Up To You" — 3:44
10. "Doctor" — 4:25
11. "Never Ending" — 5:04
12. "Soda" — 7:41
13. "Iris-Ann (reprise)" — 0:56

== Personnel ==
- Jake Andrews — guitars
- Nicholai Danko — drums
- Ben Nash — vocals, guitar
- Garth Tregillgas (credited as G. Surls) — bass, guitar, vocals

=== Additional personnel ===
- Robert F. Cranny — keyboards, vocals
- Greg Wales — percussion
- Tim Whitten — synthesizer ("Sunshine")
- Lauren Friedman — vocals ("Don't Know Much")
