= Storms Dressed as Stars =

Studio album by Gersey
- Released: 2002
- Recorded: Paradise Studios, Sydney, May–June 2002
- Genre: Indie rock
- Length: 46:44
- Label: Trifekta
- Producer: Tim Whitten

Gersey chronology
| Hope Springs (2000) | Storms Dressed as Stars (2002) | No Satellites (2006) |

Professional ratings
Review scores
| Source | Rating |
|---|---|
| Herald Sun | 2.5/5 stars |
| The Australian | 3/5 stars |
| Sunday Telegraph | 3/5 stars |
| The Courier-Mail | 3.5/5 stars |
| Sunday Herald Sun | 4/5 stars |

Storms Dressed as Stars is the second album by Melbourne indie band Gersey. It was released in 2002. Two singles were taken from the album — "Look to the Sun" and "For Whom Do You Sail?", which included four tracks from a radio session recorded for California radio station KCRW's "Morning Becomes Electric" show.

== Track listing ==
(all songs by Gersey)

1. "Wait Here" — 3:35
2. "The Night We Walked to Mexico" — 6:11
3. "Baby, You're a Strange Girl" — 5:57
4. "Crashing" — 5:09
5. "Trouble With Jonah" — 3:26
6. "For Whom Do You Sail?" — 2:52
7. "Look to the Sun" — 3:59
8. "La Zona Rosa" — 3:33
9. "Goodbye, Columbus" — 2:23
10. "The Last Tango" — 3:12
11. "A Day to be Certain" — 6:26

== Personnel ==
- Craig Jackson — bass, vocals
- Daryl Bradie — guitar
- Danny Tulen — drums
- Matt Davis — guitar

=== Additional musicians ===
- Peter Hollo — cello ("For Whom Do You Sail?")
- Lara Goodridge — violin ("For Whom Do You Sail?")
- Katie Broadbent — vocals ("Trouble With Jonah", "The Last Tango")
