= 78 Saab =

Australian rock band

- Origin: Canberra, Australia
- Genres: Rock; Alternative rock Indie rock
- Years active: 1995–2013
- Labels: Troy Horse; Ivy League; Other Tongues
- Past members: Benjamin Nash; Garth Tregillgas; Jake Andrews; Nicholai Danko; Robert F. Cranny; Darren Smith; Christovac Thompson
- Website: Official website

78 Saab were a rock band from Australia that consisted of Ben Nash (vocals and guitar), Jake Andrews (guitar and vocals), Garth Tregillgas (bass and vocals) and Nicholai Danko (drums and percussion). The band has stated that it was influenced by acts such as the Rolling Stones, R.E.M. and The Church. After forming in Canberra, Australia, during the summer of 1995–6, they relocated to Sydney in February 1997.

== Origins ==
78 Saab formed at the Australian National University, with the original members being Nash, Tregillgas, Darren Smith and Christovac Thompson. For the purpose of attaining live performance experience, they entered the Australian National Campus Band Competition in 1996, with the band name chosen spontaneously in order to complete the entry form. In a 2007 interview, Nash explained the inspiration for the "last minute" title:

"I used to own a 1978 Saab which I bought off my grandparents for around a thousand bucks when I was at university. Anyway, we entered a band competition and we had about three hours to come up with a name. "78 Saab" got thrown in the ring and for better or worse we've stuck with that name."

At the time, the major sponsor of the competition was Troy Horse, a Sydney-based rehearsal studio that also operated a record label. The competition's first prize included an EP to be recorded and released by Troy Horse and a tour of Australian university campuses. 78 Saab won the competition and as a result recorded their debut EP, Eastwards By Removal at Troy Horse's studio in Alexandria, Sydney.

After its release in 1997, the band prepared for a run of 35 dates to promote the EP. Before the tour began however, Darren Smith made the decision not to continue with the band and Jake Andrews joined 78 Saab as lead guitarist.

Soon after the end of the tour Christovac Thompson left 78 Saab and Nicholai Danko (whom the band had met whilst performing at Charles Sturt University in Wagga Wagga) replaced him on drums.

== Career ==
78 Saab were among the first bands to work with Winterman & Goldstein, a management company that started their own label, Ivy League Records. Though the label was initially created to release recordings by the company's founders, 78 Saab were the first band to give them notoriety in a purely management role – a foundation on which Winterman & Goldstein would later achieve international success with The Vines and Jet.

Among the first releases on Ivy League were 78 Saab's "Whatever Makes You Happy" single and their second EP, Hello Believers. A later re-pressing of the EP featured all seven songs from both recordings. Hello Believers also featured Robert F. Cranny on keyboards, who later went on to work with Sydney artist Sarah Blasko. Though not a full-length release, Hello Believers was listed at No. 93 in the Oz Music Project's Top 100 Australian Albums of the 90s.

In 1999, 78 Saab began working on their debut album with producer Tim Whitten (Powderfinger, Gaslight Radio) at Sydney's Megaphon Studios, recording the song "Sunshine" as the first single. The remainder of the album was recorded with Greg Wales at Hothouse Studios in St Kilda, Victoria. Picture a Hum, Can't Hear a Sound, was released in 2000 on Ivy League Records, and received significant airplay on radio station Triple J, with "Sunshine", "Karma Package Deal", "Smile" and "Jack Frost" all achieving high rotation. Tregillgas was credited as G. Surls on the album and Cranny again featured on keyboards, though these would be his last recordings with the band.

78 Saab's second album, Crossed Lines, was released in October 2004 with Tim Whitten again behind the desk at Megaphon. The album featured more of their signature alternative rock songs, alongside more adventurous arrangements. Singles from the album included "Beat of Your Drum" and "No Illusions", the latter of which gave the band their biggest taste of commercial radio play to date. During this period, 78 Saab's live keyboard player was Luke "Stoltz" Shepherd.

78 Saab's third album, The Bells Line, recorded this time by Wayne Connolly, was released by Ivy league Records on 29 September 2007. The album's title and chief inspiration was described by Nash as coming from the long drives between his Sydney home and his family farm near Orange, New South Wales. Bells Line of Road is the name of the original, pre-freeway route that runs from the outer suburbs of Sydney over the Blue Mountains. "One of These Days" and "Drive" from the album again provided the band with national radio exposure.

78 Saab released their fourth album, Good Fortune, on 15 October 2010, again recorded by Tim Whitten. A film clip for the song "Warm Jets" was released and the band toured Australia in early 2011 with Kirsten Morley on keyboards. For the first time the album was available on vinyl as well as CD and MP3.

In late 2012, almost 18 years after their formation, 78 Saab made the decision to disband. The band performed their final Sydney gig at their spiritual home, the Annandale Hotel, in December of that year. Although this was intended as their swan song, they resurfaced to play in Canberra on 11 March 2013 as part of the capital's 100th anniversary celebrations. 78 Saab said they were proud to share the stage with other bands that also had their origins in Canberra such as the Falling Joys and The Church.

== Other projects ==
Nash has collaborated with Adalita Srsen from Magic Dirt and performed live with her during the "Tough Love" tour, which featured 78 Saab supporting Magic Dirt.

Danko has performed live with Tucker B's, For Fuck's Sakes and The Cops. He has also recorded with Josh Pyke and Sarah Blasko, with whom he played live in 2003.

Tregillgas played bass on three songs with Sydney band Wifey on their Salt Sugar Fat EP released in 2009. 78 Saab's live keyboard player from the Good Fortune era, Kirsten Morley, was a full-time member of the band.

== Discography ==
- Picture a Hum, Can't Hear a Sound (2000)
- Crossed Lines (October 2004)
- The Bells Line (September 2007)
- Good Fortune (October 2010)
