= Crossed Lines =

Crossed Lines may refer to:

- Crosstalk in telephony; a telephone connection that has been misconfigured such that another call or calls can be heard
- Crossed Lines (album), 2004 album by Australian rock band 78 Saab
- Crossed Lines (film), 2007 Chinese anthology film
