= The Bells Line =

Studio album by 78 Saab
- Released: September 2007
- Genre: Rock
- Length: 41:09
- Label: Ivy League Records
- Producer: Wayne Connolly, 78 Saab

78 Saab chronology
Crossed Lines (2004)	The Bells Line (2007)	Good Fortune (2010)

Professional ratings
Review scores
Source	Rating
Sunday Herald Sun	4/5 stars
Sydney Morning Herald	2/5 stars

The Bells Line is the third album by Australian rock band 78 Saab. It was released in 2007.

The three-year gap between albums was described in one newspaper story as a source of consternation for the band: "Nash says it stems from a combination of laziness and the need to juggle day jobs to pay the rent." The album's chief inspiration was described as coming from songwriter Ben Nash's four-hour commute between his childhood home, his parents' farm in Orange, New South Wales and his Sydney base. The Bells Line is the name of the road that leads from Richmond in Sydney's west through the Blue Mountains, the route Nash would take going home.

The album's opening song, "Sleepless Nights", begins with the line, "Up on the Bells Line, we disappear ..." "That came to me as I was driving with my wife just on twilight on a cold winter's night," Nash told the Herald Sun. "A lot of ideas come to me when I'm driving, and I like the way subconscious thoughts materialise that way."

The band rehearsed for the album in an old church hall near the Nash family property before joining producer Wayne Connolly in the studio. "We froze our arse off. It was the middle of winter, but it was a productive time. A lot of ideas were thrown around," Nash said.

== Track listing ==
(all tracks by 78 Saab)

1. "Sleepless Nights" – 3:38
2. "Drive" – 4:00
3. "One of These Days" – 3:42
4. "Needle in the Hay" – 4:20
5. "Messed Up" – 4:18
6. "Lean on In" – 3:42
7. "Kandahar" – 5:15
8. "Haul Away" – 3:06
9. "Nothing as It Seems" – 4:10
10. "Sleepyhead" – 4:58

== Personnel ==
- Jake Andrews – guitars, keyboards, vocals
- Nicholai Danko – drums, percussion
- Ben Nash – vocals, guitar
- Garth Tregillgas – bass

== Additional musicians ==
- Tim Kevin – piano ("Nothing As It Seems")
- Jim Moginie – keyboards ("Kandahar", "Sleepyhead"), guitar ("Sleephead")
- Jason Walker – pedal steel ("Sleepless Nights", "Lean On In", "Haul Away")
