= Hitch on the Leaves =

Studio album by Gaslight Radio
- Released: 1998
- Genres: Indie rock Dream pop Shoegaze
- Length: 32:11
- Label: Lonely Guy

Gaslight Radio chronology
Hitch on the Leaves (1998)	Z-Nation (2003)

Professional ratings
Review scores
Source	Rating
Allmusic	4/5 stars

Hitch on the Leaves is the debut studio album by Australian dream pop band Gaslight Radio. Allmusic called the album "a wonderful debut album from this quintet, equal parts pretty Cocteau Twins-inspired shoegaze and fragile rock drive."

== Track listing ==
No.	Title	Length
1.	"New Estate Dreamboat"	3:41
2.	"Spindlings of the Summer"	2:53
3.	"Angel Wired"	5:05
4.	"Take The Ring"	1:35
5.	"Shadowing"	4:21
6.	"Red Shield Marchin'"	1:46
7.	"Ditchin' This Fixed State"	1:13
8.	"Rosalie"	6:19
9.	"Blue Horizon"	1:57
10.	"Purple"	3:21
Total length:		32:11
