= Good Fortune (78 Saab album) =

Studio album by 78 Saab
- Released: 15 October 2010
- Recorded: Megaphon, Big Jesus Burger Studios, Sydney
- Genre: Rock
- Length: 38:52
- Label: Other Tongues
- Producer: Tim Whitten, 78 Saab

78 Saab chronology
The Bells Line (2007)	Good Fortune (2010)

Professional ratings
Review scores
Source	Rating
The Courier-Mail	4/5 stars
The Sydney Morning Herald	Favorable

Good Fortune is the fourth and final album by Australian rock band 78 Saab, released in 2010.

The album came three years after its predecessor, The Bells Line, during which time frontman Ben Nash said the band had been drifting and procrastinating. The catalyst for a return to songwriting and recording was the death of a photographer friend in 2008, which inspired the song "Warm Jets". Nash told Beat magazine: "We were going through a difficult time as a band anyway. We didn't really talk about things, we just internalised a lot of stuff lyrically, maybe that's why the album is a bit darker than usual. But when you have a close friend that passes away or issues on the home front, it makes you realise how fleeting life can be and how important it is to grab those opportunities. You just may not be here next month. As soon as that hit home for us, we realised we still had a purpose as a band and we'd been coasting around for too long. We knew we were capable of walking into the rehearsal room and punching out a couple of good songs - so we decided to do that and concentrate completely."

Nash said "Warm Jets" was built around the friend who died and his love of photography, "but the trick was to write this song about a mate passing away, though without sounding too heavy-handed. In the end I was happy with the way the message is conveyed—it's still uplifting at the same time as touching."

He said the album's title was a recognition that the band had "really had good fortune in that we are still mates with a good body of work behind us as a band. From day one the philosophy has always been that you're in charge of your own destiny. It's amazing when you think that we started out in Canberra back in 1996 after winning a band competition. Once the band managed to find its own identity and its true sound - that was the most exciting experience ever. When you start putting together quality songs you realise that this is no longer an illusion, you're a real band. It's that moment of, 'wow, we're really onto something here.'"

== Track listing ==
(all songs by 78 Saab)

1. "Both Sides" — 3:16
2. "Whatever Rules You Break" — 3:15
3. "Warm Jets" — 4:43
4. "Never Gonna Be" — 3:19
5. "Avarice" — 4:44
6. "All at Sea" — 3:48
7. "Chasing the Light" — 3:25
8. "Hold You" — 3:47
9. "Situations" — 4:22
10. "Small Things" — 4:09

== Personnel ==
- Jake Andrews — guitars, keyboards
- Nicholai Danko — drums, percussion
- Ben Nash — vocals, guitar
- Garth Tregillgas — bass

== Additional musicians ==
- Tim Whitten — synthesizer ("Chasing the Light")
- Kathryn Brownhill — cello ("Never Gonna Be")
