= Lakshmi Vijayam =

Lakshmi Vijayam (transl. good fortune) may refer to:

- Lakshmi Vijayam (1976 film), an Indian Malayalam-language film
- Lakshmi Vijayam (1948 film), an Indian Tamil-language film

== See also ==
- Good Fortune (disambiguation)
