= No Satellites =

Studio album by Gersey
- Released: August 2006
- Recorded: Birdland Studios, Melbourne, 2005-2006
- Genre: Indie rock
- Length: 52:54
- Label: Inertia
- Producer: Dean Dirt, Gersey

Gersey chronology
Storms Dressed as Stars (2002)	No Satellites (2006)

Professional ratings
Review scores
Source	Rating
The Daily Telegraph	3.5/5 stars
Sydney Morning Herald	3.5/5 stars
The Age	4/5 stars

No Satellites is the third album by Melbourne indie band Gersey. It was released in 2006.

The band had spent much of the four years since Storms Dressed as Stars performing in Australia and the US and retreated to rehearsal studios for two years, writing, shaping and editing new material. When the band did make rare live appearances, it was under an assumed name to test out the new songs. Guitarist Matt Davis said: "We wanted to make every song fully fledged, and I think we did become more serious about it. We realised that it is a privilege to be able to make a record, and a privilege to still be in a band. Making a third album is an achievement in itself in Australia, so we thought, 'Let's just make a cracking record with some darkness and some light'."

== Track listing ==
(all songs by Gersey)

1. "I'm Still Here" — 4:39
2. "Small Change" — 5:22
3. "No Love" — 3:53
4. "Fractures" — 4:17
5. "Fire" — 4:06
6. "Fourteen Shades" — 5:53
7. "The Girl in My Gun" — 3:28
8. "Remains" — 3:40
9. "Sinners in White" — 3:32
10. "Gracie" — 2:54
11. "Roll Out the Heartbreakers" — 5:47
12. "Searchlights" — 5:22

== Personnel ==
- Craig Jackson — bass, vocals
- Daryl Bradie — guitar
- Danny Tulen — drums
- Matt Davis — guitar
- Drew Pearse — guitar
