= Scattered Order =

Australian post punk band

- Origin: Sydney, New South Wales, Australia
- Genres: Post-punk; experimental; electronica
- Years active: 1979–1992; 1997–2000; 2011–present
- Labels: M Squared; Volition; Sevcom
- Members: Mitch Ross-Jones; Michael Tee; Shane Fahey
- Past members: Drusilla Johnson; Patrick Gibson; Michael Prowse; R. Scott Holmes; D. C. Robertson; Geoff Holmes; Greg Fitzgerald
- Website: scatteredorder.com

Scattered Order are an Australian post-punk band, which started as an experimental rock trio. They were formed in 1979 by founding mainstay Mitch Jones on vocals, guitar and bass guitar and Michael Tee on guitar and synths. Their line up changed often through the 1980s and 1990s. In late 1983 Drusilla Johnson joined on synthesiser and vocals – Johnson and Jones later married. The band went on hiatus from 2000–2011, reforming with a line-up featuring Jones, Tee and Shane Fahey from Makers of the Dead Travel Fast.

== History ==
Scattered Order were formed in Sydney in 1979 by Mitchell Law Ross-Jones (a.k.a. Mitch Jones) on vocals, guitar and bass; Michael Tee on guitar and Simon Vidale on drums. Jones worked as a live sound engineer for the Birthday Party and Pel Mel. Jones and Tee formed their own record label, M Squared. Patrick Gibson joined on guitar and synthesiser in January 1980. According to musicologist Ian McFarlane, their "aim was to combine all manner of 'found sounds' and loose song structures with a perverse absurdist sense of humour (in the Snakefinger/Residents vein) and set them to a rock backing; in short, white noise with an amphetamine beat."

The group's first recording, "Bent Up", appeared on a Various Artists album, Growing Pains (November 1980), for their own label. The band issued a four-track extended play, Screaming Tree (May 1981). They followed with another track, "I'm not Whole", for another Various Artists compilation, A Selection (November). In November 1982 they released their debut album, Prat Culture, which was recorded with the line up of Gibson, Jones and Tee joined by Michael Prowse on drums. McFarlane felt it was "abrasive"; while Tharunka's reviewer observed, "I'm forced to describe it as avant-guard [sic], which pisses me off because that means it's esoteric, inaccessible and generally annoying... [it] has its high spots; Side one is 45 rpm, side two 33 1/3 and there is even a lyric sheet. Music to do housework to."

Gibson and Tee left the group late in 1982. A seven-track EP, I Feel so Relaxed with You (October 1983), was issued by the line up of Jones, Prowse and Shane Fahey on synthesiser and vocals (ex-the Makers of the Dead Travel Fast). It was recorded from March to May at M Squared Studio with Drusilla Johnson supplying cover artwork. McFarlane cited Mark Mordure's description the EP, "all open guts and withered emotions", who compared it to work by Public Image Ltd. Jon Casimir of The Canberra Times felt the group were, "Heavily influenced by European electronic music, particularly the likes of Can, their objective was to explore the possibilities of mixing 'white noise with a beat'."

Johnson, who later married Jones, (a.k.a. Drusilla Dorothy Ross-Jones) joined the group on synthesiser and vocals along with D. C. "Craig" Robertson on bass guitar (ex-Pel Mel plus Prowse's band mate from Prod) and R. Scott-Holmes on vocals, guitar, synthesiser and percussion (ex-Same). At the end of 1983 Jones discontinued the label, M Squared, and the group were signed with Volition Records. He later explained, "It ended with a lot of debts and we locked the place up and hid from the landlord." They recorded a live seven-track EP, A Dancing Foot and a Praying Knee Don't Belong on the Same Leg (May 1984), at Wakefield Musicians Club in January with Tim Whitten producing. It cost $200, which McFarlane noticed, "featured a rhythmic brand of clattering, metallic funk." Fahey left before the album appeared.

Scattered Order's next studio album, Career of the Silly Thing, for a cost of $3000, appeared in September 1985, with McFarlane declaring, "[it] represented something of a breakthrough release, revealing a shift towards a more conventional and melodic yet still challenging sound." Casimir determined, "[it] is their most interesting and accessible, with a more harmonious synthesis of noise and beat than they had previously achieved... [and] reveals an obsession with the grotesque on the part of major songwriters." Jones explained to Casimir, "Dru and I got married... This is our honeymoon album. A lot of the lyrics were written on our honeymoon... I'm fascinated with the grotesque. I'd be the first person to be physically ill at it. I'm probably a big wimp." They toured with fellow Sydney-based label mates, Severed Heads, and supported United States group, the Residents, on their Australian tour.

Geoff Holmes (ex-Wildcat Tamers) joined on guitar in August 1986, while Scott-Holmes left early in the next year. They released a four-track EP, Selling the Axe to Buy the Wood, in June 1987. McFarlane believed that a track, "'Loose in the House', [is] the closest Scattered Order came to scoring a 'hit' single." Prowse had already left the band and in January of the following year they recorded their next album, Comfort (May 1988), using session drummers, Greg Fitzgerald and Robert Souter. One of its two discs contained new work while the other was a compilation of eight tracks of earlier material. "King of Blip", appeared as their next single in April. With Fitzgerald joining them, they toured the east coast of Australia for four weeks and were supported by Canberra group, Falling Joys.

They issued their next album, Professional Dead Ball, in November 1991, then went into hiatus and returned in April 1997 with another album, Chicken Hilton, on the Rather Be Vinyl label.

The group went on hiatus again in 2000, reforming in 2011 with original members Jones and Tee and joined by Shane Fahey. They have released six studio albums under the reformed line-up, most recently A Suitcase Full Of Snow Globes in 2017.

== Discography ==
=== Albums ===
- Prat Culture (November 1982) – M Squared (M2020)
  - Prat Culture + Screaming Tree CD reissue through Sevcom 1998
- Career of the Silly Thing (September 1985) – Volition (VOLT 2)
  - Career of the Silly Thing (1986) – Fire/Ink (INK 17)
  - Career of the Silly Thing (1998, CD reissue) – Sevcom
- Comfort (2×LP, May 1988) – Volition (VOLT 14)
- Professional Dead Ball (November 1991) – Volition (VOLT CD 41)
- Chicken Hilton (April 1997) – Rather Be Vinyl (PTOOIE1cd)
- Asleep in the Knife Drawer (May 1997) – Rather Be Vinyl via Sevcom (PTOOIE2cd)
- SO (September 2009) – Rather Be Vinyl (PTOOIE4cdr)
- Adjust The Terminology (September 2010) – Klanggalerie / Rather Be Vinyl (GG146)
- It's Behind You (May 2011) – Rather Be Vinyl (PTOOIE6cdr)
- The Order Of Things On Planet Scrape (2012) – Rather Be Vinyl (PTOOIE10CDr)
- Puppy Frequencies (Live album, 2012) – Klanggalerie (GG182)
- Some Men Remember Music (2016) – Rather Be Vinyl (PTOOIE11LP)
- A Suitcase Full Of Snow Globes (2017) – Rather Be Vinyl (PTOOIE12CD)
- Everything Happened in the Beginning (2020) — Provenance

=== Extended plays ===
- Screaming Tree (May 1981) – M Squared (M2008)
- I Feel so Relaxed with You... (October 1983) – M Squared (M2024)
- A Dancing Foot and a Praying Knee Don't Belong on the Same Leg (May 1984, live EP) – Volition Records (VOLT 1)
- Selling the Axe to Buy the Wood (September 1987) Volition (VOLT 8)
- Sheer (April 1992) Volition
- Odd Din (2011) – Rather Be Vinyl (PTOOIE 9)
- Mucky Duck (2011, live EP) – Rather Be Vinyl (PTOOIE 8)
- Full Metal EUROPE (2016, live EP) – Terrorgraph (V/001)

=== Singles ===
- "Escape Via Cessnock" (October 1985) – Volition (VOLT 4)
  - "Escape Via Cessnock" (1986) – Ink Records (INK 1217)
- "King of Blip" (April 1988) – Volition (VOLT 12 )
- "Free Sandy Nelson" / "Brother Number 1" (March 1998) – Rather Be Vinyl (PTOOIE2cas) Numbered edition of 100. Released with matching tea towel.
- "A Solar Rush Towards A Treble Heaven" (August 2011) – Rather Be Vinyl (PTOOIE7cdr)
- "Bodram Bogota" (2015) – Iceage Productions (ICE056)
