= Crossed Lines (album) =

Studio album by 78 Saab
- Released: 18 October 2004
- Studio: Megaphon & Sony Studios, Sydney, Australia
- Genre: Rock
- Length: 42:28
- Label: Ivy League Records
- Producer: Tim Whitten & 78 Saab

78 Saab chronology
Picture a Hum, Can't Hear a Sound (2000)	Crossed Lines (2004)	The Bells Line (2007)

Professional ratings
Review scores
Source	Rating
The Age	4/5 stars
The Daily Telegraph	4/5 stars
Sunday Herald Sun	4/5 stars
Sydney Morning Herald	3.5/5 stars

Crossed Lines is the second album by Australian rock band 78 Saab. It was released in October 2004.

== Track listing ==
All tracks written by Ben Nash and 78 Saab, except where noted

1. "No Illusions" – 3:36
2. "Cops" – 3:42
3. "Beat of Your Drum" – 3:55
4. "Come On" – 4:08
5. "All a Lie" – 5:50
6. "The City is Humming" (B. Nash, J. Andrews, 78 Saab) – 2:58
7. "High Above the World" – 3:33
8. "We All Get By" – 4:06
9. "Saviour" (B. Nash, J. Andrews, 78 Saab) – 3:51
10. "You and Your Friends" – 4:36
11. "Know What You Want" – 2:14

== Personnel ==
- Jake Andrews – guitars, vocals, keyboards
- Nicholai Danko – drums, percussion
- Ben Nash – vocals, guitar
- Garth Tregillgas – bass

=== Additional musicians ===
- Stu Hunter — keyboards
