= The Makers of the Dead Travel Fast =

Australian experimental band

- Origin: Sydney, New South Wales, Australia
- Genres: Experimental
- Years active: 1980–1983
- Labels: M-Squared; Extreme
- Past members: Greg Addison; David Bullock; Steve Couri; Shane Fahey; Peter Richardson; Tim Schultz

The Makers of the Dead Travel Fast, sometimes seen as The Dead Travel Fast, was an Australian experimental music band formed in 1980. They issued two albums, The Vessels (1981) and Zoom Is Less than Man (1983), before disbanding in 1983.

== History ==
The Makers of the Dead Travel Fast was formed in Sydney in 1980, as an experimental music group by Greg Addison on guitar and vocals, David Bullock on percussion, Steve Couri on bass guitar, Shane Fahey on synthesiser and vocals, Peter Richardson on piano, percussion and vocals; and Tim Schultz on saxophone, vocals and percussion. The band's name is a quote from Bram Stoker's Dracula.

Australian musicologist, Ian McFarlane, felt they "created evocative washes of electronic soundscapes punctuated by all manner of percussion, eerie vocals, fluttering guitar and delicate sax." They signed with M Squared late in 1980, which was a label and studio set up by Scattered Order's Mitch Jones and Michael Tee. Jonathan Green of The Canberra Times observed that the label's music "has been fundamentally electronic, always different and often very good, that lay well to left field and would have been too risky, adventurous or good for other established companies."

The Makers of the Dead Travel Fast issued their debut single, "Tael of the Saeghors", in December 1980. McFarlane stated that it "became something of a cult hit, and the band made its first live appearances." Bullock had left before the single appeared. In February 1981 another The Canberra Times correspondent opined that they "released a rather remarkable single last year and should prove interesting," when recommending their gig at the Australian National University.

Phil Turnbull of No Night Sweats felt that "Tael of the Saeghors" was "one of the best songs he's ever heard. Floating, watery sounds made by synths and bubble-makers lead into a lilting, gorgeous two chord progression in 3/4 time and psuedo pirate verse [sic] ('ay, capn', et al) followed by a late-night busker sax melody that takes the place of the chorus. I've never heard anything remotely like it before or since."

Vessels, the group's debut album, appeared in 1981, which McFarlane described as having "mixed atmospheric, uncluttered sound textures with understated dynamics. The music drew certain parallels with the work of Brian Eno and the second side of David Bowie's Low." They followed with a four-track extended play, Why Won't We Wake?, at the end of that year. The group went into hiatus for about a year.

The Makers of the Dead Travel Fast returned to the recording studio in 1983 to work on their second album, Zoom Is Less than Man (styled as Zoom < Man). They disbanded by the end of that year. Shane Fahey later joined Scattered Order. A retrospective compilation, by the group, G'arage D'Or, was released on the Extreme label in 1991.

On 2 February 2002, Howlspace's Ed Nimmervoll listed the various artists' compilation, Can't Stop It: Australian Post-Punk 1978-82 on Chapter Records CD, as album of the week, saying that post punk "...was a unique period of Australian music then, and now, one we'll probably never see again." The album includes the band's track, "The Dumb Waiters", which was the B-side of "Tael of the Saeghors". In May–June 2009 M Squared released a vinyl set, M Squared – Pardon Me for Barging in Like This, which included the band's "Style Noodle" on the third LP.

In January 2010 Ascension Records reissued the band's music on disk two of a commemorative compilation CD, Terrace Industry (ANCD036), along with bands such as Scattered Order, Systematics, A Cloakroom Assembly and Prod. In 2011 Ascension released another compilation, 41 Pardons, which also includes six songs from the band.

== Members ==
- Peter Richardson (piano, keyboards)
- Greg Addison (guitar)
- Steve Couri (bass)
- Tim Schultz (saxophone, bongos)
- Shane Fahey (synthesizer, loops)
