= Gaslight Radio =

Australian indie rock band

- Origin: Burleigh Heads, Queensland, Australia
- Genres: Indie rock; dream pop; shoegaze; indie pop
- Years active: 1995–2009
- Labels: Lonely Guy/MDS; Zomba/Silvertone; Love + Mercy/Inertia
- Past members: Martin Cooke; Rory Cooke; Simon Piper; Phil Roubin; Matt Davis; Nick Treweek; Alex Jarvis; Emily Fullerton; Peter Mclean; Michael Regan; Cameron Teys

Gaslight Radio were an Australian indie rock band founded by brothers and songwriters, Martin (guitar, keys, percussion) and Rory Cooke (vocals, guitar) who were joined later by Simon Piper (drums) and Phil Roubin (bass guitar) in Burleigh Heads, Queensland in 1995. They released three studio albums, Hitch on the Leaves (September 1998), Z-Nation (2003) and Good Heavens Mean Times (July 2006), before disbanding in 2009.

== History ==
Gaslight Radio formed in Burleigh Heads, Queensland in 1995 as an indie guitar pop group by the Cooke brothers, better known by various media outlets, as "the boys from Burleigh Heads." The Cooke brothers grew up in a housing commission suburb, Burleigh Park, which later became part of Burleigh Heads. Rory later explained why he took up song writing, "If someone is in their bedroom with their headphones on, trying to drown their parents' fighting, that's when music can mean the most."

Gaslight Radio recorded a four-track demo in the Gold Coast hinterland, which included the hit single "Tarmac and Line" sending a bidding frenzy amongst the major labels. They signed with Karl Richter's, Lonely Guy Records, and Michael Gudinski's, Mushroom Publishing / MDS. The first EP, Torchin' Towns, Hankering Homes (August 1996), was recorded over the Easter weekend with Greg Wales (Drop City) producing at Smash Studios, Sydney. Australian musicologist, Ian McFarlane, opined, "With influences drawn from US bands like The Pixies, Pavement and The Breeders, the band fashioned a compelling brand of low-fi indie guitar pop." Its five tracks were "earning the band across-the-board praise." "Tarmac and Line" was one of its popular tracks.

They recorded their second five-track EP, ...Our Dolelove (June 1997), in Melbourne during mid-1997 with the assistance of Charles Bickford from the Paradise Motel. It appeared via Lonely Guy Records and was distributed by Mushroom Distribution Services (MDS). McFarlane felt its "track 'The Singer's a Liar' highlighted the band's off-kilter inventiveness." Extensive touring was undertaken in support of the EP, including a national support with Even and Header.

In late 1997 Gaslight Radio recorded four tracks for their third EP, Is by Bus (November 1997), with Lindsay Gravina (Underground Lovers, Magic Dirt) at Birdland Studios, Melbourne. The title track, "Is by Bus", received significant airplay. Phil Roubin departed the band, prior to their relocation from the Gold Coast to Melbourne.

Gaslight Radio's debut, Hitch on the Leaves (September 1998), was released to critical acclaim: McFarlane described it as "a fine example of indie guitar-pop," while AllMusic's Ned Raggett rated it as four out-of five stars. He explained, "[it is] a wonderful debut album from this quintet, equal parts pretty Cocteau Twins-inspired shoegaze and fragile rock drive... [they] don't sound like a cloning of any one group in particular, partially since the group turns from total feedback overdrive to subtler, slow motion approaches."

In December 1999 they issued a six-track EP, Sleeveful of Slight, via Silvertone Records, "With a new bass player and drummer installed, the band recorded new material." Five of its tracks were recorded in October with Tim Whitten producing. Cameron Webb of Oz Music Project felt the title track is "easily the best track here and is forged from the same mould used for the previously released 'Is by Bus' and 'Spindlings of the Summer'."

Webb observed, "Upbeat catchy pop with skewed guitars and abstract lyrics have become the trademark of Gaslight Radio and there is no shortage of those elements here. However, it is nice to hear a more minimalist approach taken to most of the other tracks where drums have been stripped back and a greater prevalence bestowed upon the organ."

A six-track EP, Chapter 6: The Hard Luck Knights, was released in 2002 via Love + Mercy / Inertia Records. Oz Music Project's Jasper Lee opined "[it] follows nicely onto their last release, the 7" Sleeveful of Slight and is broken down into two single tracks and four demo recordings... Not much to fault here, it's very much a Gaslight Radio disc, with their sound relatively intact through the years in the musical wilderness."

Z-Nation, the group's second album, was issued in 2003 via Love + Mercy / Inertia with Gravina, Michael Alonso and Glen Berry producing. According to Sam Fell of Mess + Noise "[it] was a polarising release. Still, it was a record that found the band comfortable in their own musical skin; one where they developed their signature wall of sound. 'I like that album. Not many people do, but I do,' [Rory] Cooke jokes. 'Marty and I had been doing it for a long time by that stage, we knew how to do it, realised strengths and weaknesses of certain things'." Lee opined "the band have added several members to their ranks, the sum total of their parts being a fuller version of their earlier incarnation. The ever-languid vocals of Rory Cooke still glide through the band's defining jangly indie rhythms with a seemingly enhanced vigour."

Gaslight Radio shared the stage with The Breeders, Teenage Fan Club, Sparklehorse, Pavement, Spoon, Pulp, Yo La Tengo, The National and many others, while playing Big Day Out's, Livid Festival, Homebake and the Meredith Festival, to where a young film maker was documenting the bands rise to fame.

Gaslight Radio gave Garth Davis, (Lion, academy award nominee) his first shot at filming the bands hit single, Is By Bus in 1997.

The film clip for “Change the Ending” was directed by Ryley Brown: DOP Cameraman for the Hollywood blockbuster, Zero Dark Thirty.

https://www.youtube.com/watch?v=mJus32tA85o&list=RDmJus32tA85o&start_radio=1

Stephen Malkmus (founder of Pavement) was seen wearing his Gaslight Radio t - shirt on his US shows.

https://tineye.com/search/832c2b6ac8445116ff3fbc66b4c272b4a7ab140f?sort=score&order=desc&page=1

Gaslight Radio gave Garth Davis, (Lion, academy award nominee) his first shot at filming the bands hit single, Is By Bus in 1997.

In August 2007, New Zealand group Cut Off Your Hands, performed "Is by Bus", on Triple J's Like a Version program. In 2009 Gaslight Radio disbanded with Rory and Martin Cooke pursuing their own projects: Forty Thousand Sisters for Martin, and the Eliza Band for Rory. Latter day members of Gaslight Radio included Nick Treweek (2nd drummer), Matt Davis (keys), Emily Fullerton (keys), Alex Jarvis (guitar), Peter Mclean (guitar), Michael Regan (bass) and Cameron Teys (drums). Matt Bailey (keys).

In June 2015 Emporio Armani choose "Change the Ending" from Gaslight Radio's album, Good Heavens Mean Times, for an ad campaign. Martin explained "[it] was sourced old school, someone heard it on Youtube, and the negotiations started." The track was co-written by the Cooke brothers.

Martin Cooke has a new project called, Singer Mattress Cat. His LP, Subtropical Personality (December 2025), is a homage to his former government housing suburb of Burleigh Park.

As quoted in the Herald Sun, Cooke says: "Gaslight Radio were never about the awards, the industry schmoozing; always about the art, and it's great that people are rediscovering us."

https://themusic.com.au/news/armani-choose-melbourne-bands-song-to-soundtrack-new-campaign/qS26vby_vqE/25-06-15

== Discography ==
=== Albums ===
- Hitch on the Leaves (September 1998) – Lonely Guy Records / MDS (GUY004)
- Z-Nation (2003) – Love + Mercy/Inertia (Briar004)
- Magic Castle Broke Songs (compilation album, August 2004) – Independent (GR001)
- Good Heavens Mean Times (July 2006) – Love + Mercy (Briar013)

=== Extended plays ===
- Torchin' Towns, Hankerin' Homes (August 1996) – Lonely Guy Records (GUY001)
- ...Our Dolelove (June 1997) – Lonely Guy Records / MDS (GUY002)
- Is by Bus (November 1997) – Lonely Guy Records / MDS (GUY003)
- Sleeveful Of Slight (December 1999) – Silvertone Records (SILV002)
- Chapter 6: The Hard Luck Knights (2002) – Love + Mercy/Inertia (Briar001)
- One Kid (2004) – Independent

=== Singles ===
- "Guillotine Sun" (2009)
