= Tim Whitten =

Australian music producer

Tim Whitten is an Australian record producer, audio engineer, and mixer. He has worked with numerous successful Australian musicians, in a career spanning 1990—present.

== Career ==
Whitten's first recording was Boxcar's Vertigo, where he joined Adrian Bolland as engineer. Whitten has produced records for prominent Australian artists, including Powderfinger, The Go-Betweens, Hoodoo Gurus, and Augie March.

In 2004 he produced an EP for Signal Room, and he worked on an album by Gaslight Radio.

Unlike most producers, who work in a studio, most of Whitten's recording is done at his home, with artists visiting him to collaborate on works. However, he has recorded in studios on some albums. He says that his role as a producer is "make a song "work"", even if this requires unorthodox techniques to achieve results.

== Accolades ==
Whitten's production work has garnered acclaim from numerous artists. His collaboration with The Red Sun Band on their EP Like an Arrow received praise for the distinctive sonic direction he brought to the record. Australian experimental group Scattered Order similarly commended his production work. Bernard Fanning, frontman of Powderfinger, cited Whitten's cost-effectiveness compared to other producers as a determining factor in the band's decision to engage him for their 1996 album, Double Allergic.
