= Ed Kuepper discography =

Australian singer, songwriter and guitarist Ed Kuepper co-founded and recorded with the punk band The Saints, the experimental post-punk group Laughing Clowns and the grunge-like The Aints.

He has also released 18 solo albums as well as another 14 limited-release albums of live and broadcast performances.

Kuepper has won two ARIA Music Awards for Best Independent Album—Black Ticket Day (1992) and Serene Machine (1993). His highest chart placing was with Honey Steel's Gold (1991), which reached No.28 on the national album chart.

== Albums ==
=== Studio albums ===
Title	Details	Peak chart positions
Title	Details	AUS
Electrical Storm	Released: October 1985; Label: Hot (HOTLP 1020); Format: LP, cassette	—
Rooms of the Magnificent	Released: September 1986; Label: Hot (HOTLP 1027); Format: LP, cassette	98
Everybody's Got To	Released: June 1988; Label: Truetone (CDP 790513); Format: LP, cassette, CD	42
Today Wonder	Released: September 1990; Label: Hot (HOTLP 1032); Format: LP, cassette, CD	139
Honey Steel's Gold	Released: November 1991; Label: Hot (HOT 1036); Format: LP, cassette, CD	28
Black Ticket Day	Released: August 1992; Label: Hot (HOT 1040); Format: LP, cassette, CD	45
Serene Machine	Released: April 1993; Label: Hot (HOT 1042); Format: Cassette, CD	48
Character Assassination	Released: August 1994; Label: Hot (HOT 1049); Format: CD	32
A King in the Kindness Room	Released: July 1995; Label: Hot (HOT 1052); Format: CD	99
Frontierland	Released: October 1996; Label: Hot (HOT 1056); Format: CD	103
Starstruck	Released: 1997; Label: Hot (HOT 1064); Format: CD	—
With a Knapsack on My Back	Released: 1997; Label: Hot (HOT 1066); Format: CD	—
The Blue House	Released: 1998; Label: Hot (HOT 1071); Format: CD	—
Smile....Pacific	Released: 2000; Label: Hot (HOT 1073); Format: CD	—
Out-takes, Castaways, Pirate Women & Takeaways	Released: 2001; Label: Hot (HOT 1078); Format: CD	—
Jean Lee and the Yellow Dog	Released: 2007; Label: Hot; Format: CD, DD	—
Second Winter	Released: 2012; Label: Prince Melon; Format: CD, DD	—
The Return of the Mail-Order Bridegroom	Released: 18 April 2014; Label: Valve (V134); Format: CD, DD	—
Lost Cities	Released: December 2015; Label: Prince Melon; Format: CD, DD	—
After the Flood (with Jim White)	Released: March 2025; Label: Remote Control; Format: CD, DD	161

=== Soundtrack albums ===
Title	Details
Last Cab to Darwin	Released: August 2015; Label: Last Cab / Sony Music Australia; Format: DD

=== Live albums ===
Title	Details
Live (as Ed Kuepper & His Oxley Creek Playboys)	Released: 1998; Label: Hot (HOT 1070); Format: CD
Ed Kuepper Live	Released: 2008; Label: Prince Melon Records (year zero 01); Format: CD, DD; Note: The Prince Melon Bootleg Series – Volume 1
Ed Kuepper Live	Released: 2008; Label: Prince Melon Records (year zero 02); Format: CD, DD; Note: The Prince Melon Bootleg Series – Volume 2
Ed Kuepper Live: The Euroboot Album (with Jeffrey Wegener)	Released: 2008; Label: Prince Melon Records (year zero 03); Format: CD, DD; Note: The Prince Melon Bootleg Series – Volume 3
Ed Kuepper Live: Honey Steel's Gold Live at the Forum	Released: 2009; Label: Prince Melon Records (year zero 04); Format: CD, DD; Note: The Prince Melon Bootleg Series – Volume 4
Ed Kuepper Live: Duos, Solos and Trios	Released: 2009; Label: Prince Melon Records (year zero 05); Format: CD, DD; Note: The Prince Melon Bootleg Series – Volume 5
Ed Kuepper Live	Released: 2010; Label: Prince Melon Records (year zero 11); Format: CD, DD; Note: The Prince Melon Bootleg Series – Volume 11
Ed Kuepper Live: Studio Demos 1988 and 2007	Released: 2010; Label: Prince Melon Records (year zero 12); Format: CD, DD; Note: The Prince Melon Bootleg Series – Volume 12
Ed Kuepper Live: The Prince Melon Bootleg Series	Released: 2010; Label: Prince Melon Records (year zero 13); Format: CD, DD; Note: The Prince Melon Bootleg Series – Volume 13
Ed Kuepper Live: Long Rider on the Shortwaves, Radio Sessions 2000	Released: November 2010; Label: Prince Melon Records (year zero 14); Format: CD, DD; Note: The Prince Melon Bootleg Series – Volume 14
Ed Kuepper Live: Long Rider on the Shortwaves, Radio Sessions 1999	Released: November 2010; Label: Prince Melon Records (year zero 15); Format: CD, DD; Note: The Prince Melon Bootleg Series – Volume 15

=== Compilation albums ===
Title	Details	Peak chart positions
Title	Details	AUS
The Butterfly Net	Released: August 1993; Label: Hot (HOT 1045 CD); Format: CD, Cassette	91
The Butterfly Net	Released: 1993 (UK); Label: Castle Communications (CCS CD 384); Format: CD; Note: As Part of the Collector Series	—
Sings His Greatest Hits for You	Released: November 1995; Label: Hot (HOT 1057); Format: CD	72
Wheelie Bin Affair (Some Odds and Sods)	Released: 1997; Label: Hot (HOT 1065); Format: CD; Note: Limited numbered edition of 3000	—
Reflections of Ol' Golden Eye	Released: September 1999; Label: Hot (HOT 1072); Format: CD; Note: covers compilation	—
This Is the Magic Mile	Released: September 1999; Label: Hot (HOT 1099); Format: 3×CD	—
Singles '86–'96	Released: 28 May 2021; Label: Prince Melon; Format: CD, LP	43
The Exploding Universe of Ed Kuepper	Released: May 2021; Label: Prince Melon; Format: 4× LP	—

=== Limited release mail order albums ===
Title	Details
I Was a Mail Order Bridegroom	Released: 1995; Label: Hot (MAIL 1); Format: CD; Note: Limited Edition of acoustic versions
Exotic Mail Order Moods	Released: 1995; Label: Hot (MAIL 2); Format: CD; Note: Limited numbered edition of 3000
Starstruck: Music for Films & Adverts	Released: 1996; Label: Hot (MAIL 5); Format: CD; Note: Limited numbered edition of 3000
Cloudland (as Ed Kuepper & His Oxley Creek Playboys)	Released: 1997; Label: Hot (MAIL 7); Format: CD; Note: Limited numbered edition of 1500

== Charting singles ==
List of singles that peaked within the top 200
Title	Year	Peak chart positions	Album
Title	Year	AUS	Album
"Happy As Hell"	1990	158	
"The Way I Make You Feel"	1992	144	Honey Steel's Gold
"Real Wild Life"	1992	132	Black Ticket Day
"Sleepy Head"	1993	181	Serene Machine
"If I Had a Ticket"	1994	72	Character Assassination
"Wasn't I Pissed Off Today"	1995	196	A King in the Kindness Room
"Highway to Hell"	1995	165	A King in the Kindness Room
"Fireman Joe"	1996	160	Frontierland
"All of These Things"	1997	164	Starstruck
