= This Is the Magic Mile =

Compilation album by Ed Kuepper
- Released: December 2005
- Genre: Indie rock
- Length: 215:44
- Label: Hot Records
- Producer: Ed Kuepper, Phil Punch

Ed Kuepper chronology
Smile ... Pacific (2000)	This Is the Magic Mile (2005)	Jean Lee and the Yellow Dog (2007)

Professional ratings
Review scores
Source	Rating
Daily Telegraph	4/5 stars
The Sun-Herald	8/10 stars
Sunday Herald Sun	3.5/5 stars

This Is the Magic Mile is a three-CD compilation album by Australian rock guitarist Ed Kuepper, released in 2005. The album is a 49-track retrospective of his output from 1991 to 2000. While Smile ... Pacific (2000) and Character Assassination (1994) are heavily represented—with 15 tracks drawn from the two albums—the collection also includes a 1994 single ("If I Had a Ticket"), several cuts from limited-release mail-order albums and two tracks from his side project The Aints.

The album includes a song, "Camooweal", that had originally been recorded for the Slim Dusty tribute album Not So Dusty (1998), which had also featured Midnight Oil, Mental as Anything and Cold Chisel's Don Walker. Other covers included AC/DC's "Highway to Hell" and Eric Burdon's "When I Was Young".

== Track listing ==
(All songs by Ed Kuepper except where noted)

Disc one
No.	Title	Origin	Length
1.	"All of These Things"	from Frontierland, 1996	4:43
2.	"Confessions of a Window Cleaner"	from A King in the Kindness Room, 1995	5:52
3.	"Electrical Storm"	from Ed Kuepper and His Oxley Creek Playboys—Live!, 1998	6:39
4.	"La Di Doh"	from Character Assassination, 1992	4:56
5.	"MDDP Ltd"	from Frontierland, 1996	4:40
6.	"My Best Interests at Heart"	from Ed Kuepper and His Oxley Creek Playboys—Live!, 1998	4:34
7.	"I Wish You Were Here"	from Serene Machine, 1993	3:05
8.	"Fireman Joe"	from Frontierland, 1996	4:27
9.	"Real Wild Life"	from Black Ticket Day, 1992	3:58
10.	"Everything in the World"	from Smile ... Pacific, 2000	3:40
11.	"Sleepy Head (Serene Machine)"	from Serene Machine, 1993	4:03
12.	"Gun Runnin'"	from Cloudland, 1997	0:41
13.	"The Weepin' Willow"	from Frontierland, 1996	4:51
14.	"Without You"	from Smile ... Pacific, 2000	4:49
15.	"Like an Oil Spill"	from Ascension (The Aints), 1991	3:43
16.	"Sea Air"	from With A Knapsack On My Back, 1997	2:50
17.	"3 Stigmata of James Blood Ulmer"	from Cloudland, 1997	4:41
18.	"Everything I've Got Belongs To You"	from Honey Steel's Gold, 1991	4:12

Disc two
No.	Title	Writer(s)	Origin	Length
1.	"Maria Peripatetica"	music Ed Kuepper, lyrics traditional	from Serene Machine, 1993	3:38
2.	"The Cockfighter"		from Character Assassination, 1992	3:46
3.	"Camooweal"	Slim Dusty, Mack Cormack	from Reflections of Ol' Golden Eye, 1999	5:28
4.	"By the Way"		from Character Assassination, 1992	4:04
5.	"Angel's Lament"		from Starstruck, 1996	2:48
6.	"Pretty Mary"	music Ed Kuepper, lyrics traditional	from Today Wonder, 1990	4:20
7.	"So Close to Certainty"		from Character Assassination, 1992	4:43
8.	"Baby Well I"		from Smile ... Pacific, 2000	3:14
9.	"Blind Girl Stripper"		from Black Ticket Day, 1992	8:41
10.	"How Would You Plead?"		from Frontierland, 1996	3:23
11.	"Ill Wind"		from Character Assassination, 1992	6:39
12.	"Walked Thin Wires"		from Black Ticket Day, 1992	6:33
13.	"Little Fiddle"		from Character Assassination, 1992	4:11
14.	"Still Call This Failure My Home"		from Smile ... Pacific, 2000	3:49
15.	"Horse Under Water"		from Today Wonder, 1990	4:39
16.	"Car Headlights"		from "If I Had a Ticket" single, 1994	2:15
17.	"Today Wonder Medley"		from Today Wonder, 1990	4:12

Disc three
No.	Title	Writer(s)	Origin	Length
1.	"The Way I Made You Feel"		from Honey Steel's Gold, 1991	5:23
2.	"When I Was Young"	Eric Burdon, Vic Briggs, John Weider, Barry Jenkins, Danny McCulloch	from The Exotic Mail Order Moods of Ed Kuepper, 1995	3:18
3.	"Sinnerman"	music Ed Kuepper, lyrics traditional	from Smile ... Pacific, 2000	2:46
4.	"Highway to Hell"	Bon Scott, Angus Young, Malcolm Young	from The Wheelie Bin Affair, 1997	5:11
5.	"Here to Get My Baby From Jail"		from Smile ... Pacific, 2000	4:53
6.	"It's Lunacy"		from Black Ticket Day, 1992	4:02
7.	"Fever"	Eddie Cooley, John Davenport	from Smile ... Pacific, 2000	3:33
8.	"I'm With You"		from Character Assassination, 1992	3:08
9.	"Rue the Day"		from Smile ... Pacific, 2000	5:30
10.	"This Hideous Place"		from Serene Machine, 1993	3:15
11.	"Honey Steel's Gold"		from Honey Steel's Gold, 1991	5:25
12.	"Messin' Pt 2"		from A King in the Kindness Room, 1995	7:13
13.	"It's Still Nowhere"		from Ascension (The Aints), 1991	7:14
14.	"Black Hole"		from The Blue House, 1998	3:09
