= Reflections of Ol' Golden Eye =

Compilation album by Ed Kuepper
- Released: September 1999
- Genre: Indie rock
- Length: 71:17
- Label: Hot
- Producer: Ed Kuepper, Phil Punch

Ed Kuepper chronology
The Blue House (1998)	Reflections of Ol' Golden Eye (1999)	Smile ... Pacific (2000)

Reflections of Ol' Golden Eye is a compilation album of cover versions by Australian rock guitarist Ed Kuepper, released in 1999. It contains 16 songs that had appeared on Kuepper albums from the 1990s, with almost half them drawn from two albums, The Wheelie Bin Affair (1997) and the limited release, mail order-only Exotic Mail Order Moods (1995). One song, a 10-minute version of Del Shannon's 1961 pop hit "Runaway", had first appeared on a live album by Kuepper's band The Aints.

Other artists whose songs were covered on the album included David Bowie, Gordon Lightfoot, Nick Cave, Ricky Nelson, Slim Dusty and The Loved Ones.

== Track listing ==
No.	Title	Writer(s)	Origin	Length
1.	"Camooweal"	Slim Dusty, Mack Cormack	from Not So Dusty - a Tribute to Slim Dusty, 1998	5:26
2.	"Ring Of Fire"	June Carter, Merle Kilgore	from Character Assassination, 1994	4:02
3.	"Cypress Grove Blues"	Skip James	from The Wheelie Bin Affair, 1998	5:07
4.	"Highway to Hell"	Bon Scott, Angus Young, Malcolm Young	from A King in the Kindness Room, 1995	5:06
5.	"The Man Who Sold the World"	David Bowie	from Exotic Mail Order Moods, 1995	3:06
6.	"If I Were a Carpenter"	Tim Hardin	from Today Wonder, 1990	4:00
7.	"Sad Dark Eyes"	Gerry Humphreys, Rob Lovett, Kim Lynch, Treva Richards	from Sings His Greatest Hits for You, 1995	3:04
8.	"Steam Train"	Ray Davies	from The Wheelie Bin Affair, 1998	7:40
9.	"Built For Comfort"	Willie Dixon	from The Wheelie Bin Affair, 1998	3:01
10.	"Indian Reservation"	John D. Loudermilk	from The Wheelie Bin Affair, 1998	3:09
11.	"Do You Love Me"	Nick Cave, Martyn P. Casey	from Exotic Mail Order Moods, 1995	4:36
12.	"Sundown"	Gordon Lightfoot	from A King in the Kindness Room, 1995	4:40
13.	"If I Had a Ticket"	Phil Jones, Dave Rowlands, Chris Brown, Bill Hodgkisson, Andrew Blundell, Peter Conyngham	from Character Assassination, 1994	2:46
14.	"When I Was Young"	Eric Burdon, Vic Briggs, John Weider, Barry Jenkins, Danny McCulloch	from Exotic Mail Order Moods, 1995	3:15
15.	"Teenage Idol"	Jack Lewis	from I was a Mail Order Bridegroom, 1995	1:40
16.	"Runaway"	Del Shannon, Max Crook	from S.L.S.Q. Very Live, 1991	10:32
