= Corinda State High School =

High school in Corinda, Australia

Coordinates: 27°32′42.35″S 152°59′11.77″E

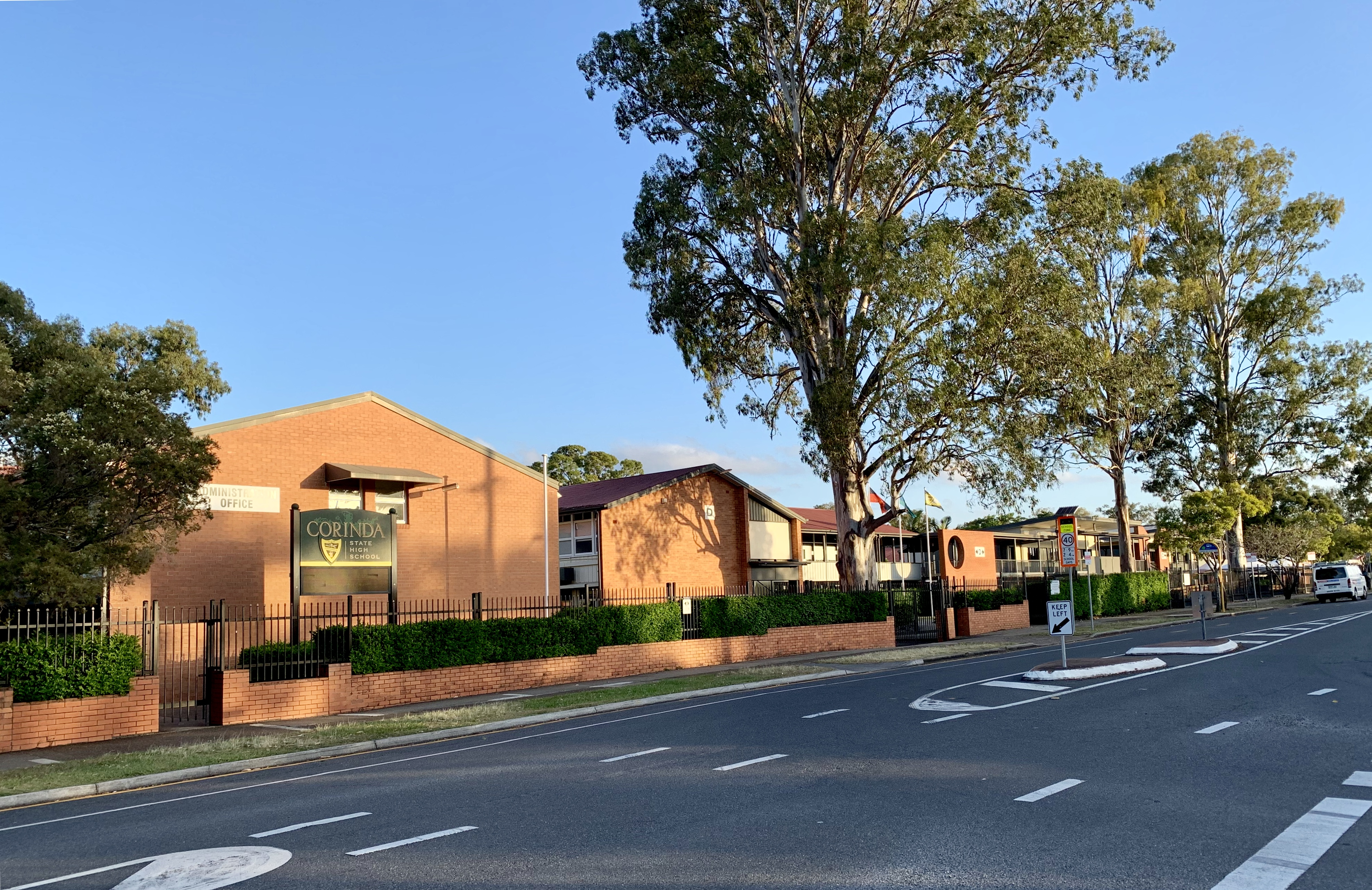
- Main entrance
- Brisbane, Queensland; Australia

Information
- Type: Public, co-educational, secondary, day school
- Motto: Latin: Hodie Quoque Cras (Not only for today but for tomorrow also)
- Established: 1960
- Principal: Ross Bailey
- Enrolment: 2132
- Campus: Urban (Corinda)
- Colours: Green and yellow
- Website: https://corindashs.eq.edu.au

Corinda State High School (CSHS) is a non-selective, co-educational, state secondary school, located in Corinda, Queensland, Australia. The school was established in 1960.

== Campus ==
The school is located on one campus in the western suburbs of Brisbane. The school has extensive outdoor as well as indoor sporting facilities, a performing arts centre and an agricultural farm as part of the "outdoor classroom".

== Extra-curricular ==
The school offers a wide variety of extra curricular activities including sports, music, arts and tours.

== Notable alumni ==
- Chris Bailey, (1973), The Saints 1974
- Jacinda Barrett, 1984–1985, Hollywood actress and model
- Natalie Cook OAM, (1991), Olympian, beach volleyball, 2000 Olympics Gold Medalist
- Melissa Howard, (2006), Australian actress, best known for playing Rebecca Ainsworth in Dead Gorgeous
- Ed Kuepper, (1973), musician, The Saints 1974–1979, The Laughing Clowns 1979–1984, The Aints, Since 1991, The Apartments
- Tevita Kuridrani, rugby player, Wallaby International debut 2013, ACT Brumbies
- Deborah Lovely, (2001), Deborah Acason, weightlifter, Commonwealth Games Gold Medalist Melbourne 2006
- Emeritus Professor William (Bill) Lovegrove AO, (mid 1960s), academic, University of Southern Queensland, awarded Officer of the Order Australia
- Geoffrey Michael William McKellar (around 1966 or 1967), oral and maxillofacial surgeon Westmead Hospital in 1981, Head of the Department in 1994 and Associate Professor at the University of Sydney in 1988
- Associate Professor Julie Ann Mundy AM, (1976), cardiothoracic surgeon
- Shane Richardson, (1973), CEO, South Sydney Rabbitohs, Rugby League Club, appointed 2004 and longest serving NRL CEO. Previously CEO Penrith Panthers 2002–03
- Robert Vickers, (1975), bass The Go Betweens, 1983–1988; publicist for New York indie label Jetset Records, 1998; Owner PR company, Proxy Media since 2005
