= The Return of the Mail-Order Bridegroom =

Studio album by Ed Kuepper
- Released: 18 April 2014
- Recorded: December 2013
- Studio: QUT Gasworks Studio
- Genre: Alternative rock
- Length: 49:10
- Label: Prince Melon Records/Valve
- Producer: Ed Kuepper, John Willsteed

Ed Kuepper chronology
Jean Lee and the Yellow Dog (2007)	The Return of the Mail-Order Bridegroom (2014)

Professional ratings
Review scores
Source	Rating
The Age	4/5 stars
The Courier-Mail	4/5 stars

The Return of the Mail-Order Bridegroom is a covers album by Australian guitarist and songwriter Ed Kuepper released in 2014. Recorded in three days and featuring Kuepper alone with no overdubbing, it contains reworked acoustic versions of songs by his former bands The Saints and Laughing Clowns, as well as new versions of his solo material and songs popularised by artists including Jimi Hendrix and The Walker Brothers. Apart from "No Regrets," all of the songs were selected from those he had played during a 2013 "Solo and By Request" Australian tour.

== Background ==
Kuepper spent most of 2013 on the road, performing a series of "Solo and By Request" shows, in which he performed almost any song from his career that his audience challenged him to play. He told Tom magazine: "It wasn’t a situation where I gave people a list of two-dozen songs and said request something from that list. They could request whatever they liked." Many of the performances were taped, but Kuepper said because they were live recordings in different rooms, the sound was different on each one. "I wanted something that was more coherent, something I was actually feeling had come out of this whole process of sort of throwing myself at the mercy of the audience in a way."

"The amount of time that was required to go through and make those recordings coherent was more than I was prepared to do—I just didn’t have that much time for it," he told the Collapse Board website. "So I thought, why don’t I just book some time for a studio and go in and play some of the songs that were requested? So I did the exact same thing in the studio. I had a list of songs that had been requested a lot and did versions of them that were different to the versions of how they were originally recorded.

"The album reflects, I think, some of the diversity of what was requested. There’s some well-known songs and some relatively not-so-well-known songs. The only song on the album that wasn’t requested on the tour was "No Regrets" by Tom Rush." He said the songs were each recorded in one take without overdubs.

The album title was a reference to I Was a Mail Order Bridegroom, a 1995 album that became the first of a series of limited release, mail-order only albums of live and broadcast performances, but he said The Return of the Mail-Order Bridegroom was the second instalment of "a kind of thread ... the one before was called Second Winter and there will be another one in this series, which is at the moment, tentatively titled Lost Cities."

== Track listing ==
1. "Brisbane (Security City)" (Ed Kuepper) – 4:23
2. "Hey Joe" (Billy Roberts) – 3:19
3. "Rue the Day" (Kuepper) – 5:48
4. "Real To Me" (Kuepper, Judi Dransfield-Kuepper) – 3:14
5. "The Way I Made You Feel" (Kuepper) – 4:00
6. "No Regrets" (Tom Rush) – 4:48
7. "All of These Things" (Kuepper) – 4:49
8. "Swing for the Crime" (Kuepper, Chris Bailey) – 4:39
9. "Cypress Grove Blues" (Skip James) – 3:01
10. "Eternally Yours" (Kuepper) – 5:40
11. "Messin' With the Kid" (Kuepper, Bailey) – 5:27

== Personnel ==
- Ed Kuepper – vocals, guitar
