= Tim Hopkins =

Australian musician

Tim Hopkins (born in Auckland, New Zealand) is an Australian jazz musician who won the Australian National Jazz Award at the Wangaratta Festival of Jazz in 1993.

== Career ==
Growing up in Brisbane, Australia, Hopkins had planned a career in graphic arts, but took up the saxophone at age 15. He graduated from the Sydney Conservatorium of Music and performed with Australian jazz musicians Vince Jones, Paul Grabowsky, James Morrison, Don Burrows, New Zealand musicians Mike Nock, Kim Patterson, Kevin Field, Frank Gibson Jnr, Nathan Haines, Mark de Clive Lowe, Andy Browne, Roger Fox, King Kapisi and Gray Bartlett. Other credits include You Am I, Kate Ceberano, Ed Kuepper, Doug Williams, Midnight Oil, Jackie Orszaczky.

His debut album in 1993 Good Heavens coincided with winning the National Jazz Saxophone Award at the Wangaratta Festival of Jazz in Australia. By the end of the 1990s he had recorded another four CDs, toured South East Asia, Canada and Europe.

In 1999, on an Australia Arts Council grant, he studied with saxophonist George Garzone in New York City. While there, he played with Jim Black and Seamus Blake, and wrote, arranged and performed with an ensemble called Phydia featuring a string quartet with a standard jazz quartet line up.

In 2000, Hopkins moved back to New Zealand and began recording and compiling his 6th solo CD Hear Now After. The first single Loophole features TV presenter Russell Harrison on vocals, rapper King Kapisi, percussionist Miguel Fuentes and Hopkins on an assortment of instruments. Loophole was included on a NZ On Air compilation disc and features a black and white video directed by the NZ Independent Film Company.

Hopkins helped to start the Heineken Green Room Sessions in New Zealand with DJ Clarke and The Gordon Bennett Project. GBP have also played at the Heineken Open, headlined in Malaysia and Singapore at several big events and released a double CD recorded at Millton Vineyards & Winery in Gisborne.

Hear Now After, which was released in March 2008, features many of the musicians listed above and other players from New Zealand and Australia, including appearances by drummer Tony Hopkins, Mike Nock, Max Stowers, Dixon Nacey, Aaron Coddel, Jonathan Zwartz and Sean Wayland.

== Discography ==
=== As leader ===
- Good Heavens! (1993)
- Pandora's Box (1994)
- Funkenstein (1995)
- Upon My Camel (1996)
- Popcorn (1997)
- Hear Now After (2008)
- Seven (2011)

=== As sideman ===
- The Aints – Ascension (1992)
- The Aints – Autocannibalism (1992)
- Australian Art Orchestra – Ringing The Bell Backwards
- D.I.G. (Directions In Groove) – Deeper (1994)
- Lily Dior – Invitation (1998)
- Paul Grabowsky – Viva Viva (1994)
- Vince Jones – Here's To The Miracles (1996)
- Ed Kuepper – Black Ticket Day (1992)
- Barney McAll – Exit (1996)
- James Muller Trio – All Out (1999)
- Mike Nock Quartet – Dark and Curious (1991)
- Mike Nock Quartet – Ozboppin' (1998)
- Jackie Orszaczky Budget Orchestra – Deep Down and Out (1998)
- Niko Schauble's Tibetan Dixie – Ya It Ma Thing
- Sean Wayland – South Pacific Soul (2002)
