= Louis Tillett =

Australian singer-songwriter (1959–2023)

- Born: Louis Rohan Tillett; 13 March 1959
- Origin: Sydney, Australia
- Died: 6 August 2023 (aged 64) Sydney, Australia
- Genres: Acoustic, psychedelic rock, garage rock
- Occupations: Singer-songwriter, musician
- Instruments: Keyboard, vocals, saxophone
- Years active: 1977–2023
- Labels: Hot, Citadel, Blue Mosque/Festival, Return to Sender/Normal, Red Eye/Polydor, Timberyard
- Website: louistillett.com

Louis Rohan Tillett (13 March 1959 – 6 August 2023) was an Australian rock music singer-songwriter, keyboardist and saxophonist. Tillett was the front man in Australian bands The Wet Taxis, Paris Green and The Aspersion Caste. He also worked as a backing musician with Catfish, Laughing Clowns, New Christs and Tex Perkins. As a solo artist, he issued seven albums, Ego Tripping at the Gates of Hell (1987), A Cast of Aspersions (1990), Letters to a Dream (1992), Cry Against the Faith (1998), Learning to Die (2001), The Hanged Man (2005) and Soliloquy (2006). He often worked with Charlie Owen, releasing two albums, The Ugly Truth (1994) and Midnight Rain (October 1995). The latter album won the Rolling Stone Critics Award for Best Album of 1996.

== Biography ==
Louis Rohan Tillett was born on 13 March 1959, and grew up in Sydney. In 1977, his first band, The Wet Taxis, began as a group "based around experiments with 'industrial noise'". In 1980, they issued a cassette, Taxidermy, on the Terse Tapes label – owned by fellow Sydney band, Severed Heads. For the album Tillett provided synthesiser (micromoog) and The Wet Taxis line up was Garry Bradbury on drum machine, Simon Knuckey on guitar, and his brother Tim Knuckey on bass guitar. In October that year, Terse Tapes released an extended play, Terse Sample, by Various Artists with tracks by Wet Taxis and label mates: Mindless Delta Children, Agent Orange and Rhoborhythmaticons.

By 1981, with Tillett on piano and lead vocals, the group were moving into a "tougher 1960s-influenced direction". In 1982, Bradbury left to join Severed Heads and was replaced by Nick Fisher on drums. Peter Watt also joined on rhythm guitar but was replaced in the next year by Penny Ikinger. In February 1984, The Wet Taxis first toured Melbourne, they were hailed as sporting an American garage-style psychedelic sound, they covered bands such as MC5, Moving Sidewalks and Unrelated Segments. In Melbourne, they supported Kids in the Kitchen at one gig and Chris Bailey at another. They followed with a live broadcast from the Prince of Wales Hotel, St.Kilda, on 3PBS FM radio.

The group signed with the Hot Records label and recorded a single, "C'mon", which was a cover version of The Atlantics 1967 track, "Come On". It was produced by David Connor and Kent Steedman, and was released in May 1984. Australian musicologist, Ian McFarlane, noted it provided "an authentic 1960s garage/R&B sound". Late that year they issued an album, From the Archives, and by February 1985 went into hiatus. In July 1986 Pollyanna Sutton of The Canberra Times described the album as "a mix of studio and live recordings over three years". In 2002, the band, alongside Laughing Clowns, The Lighthouse Keepers and Gondwanaland Project, were described by The Sydney Morning Herald's Matt Buchanan as one "of the most popular bands in the Australia's indie scene" in an article reminiscing about Hot Records.

Back in late 1983, Tillett worked with Damien Lovelock of The Celibate Rifles and Brett Myers of Died Pretty in a side project, No Dance. The trio issued a three-track EP, Carnival of Souls, in March 1984; which featured lead vocals by each member: Tillett's "Swimming in the Mirror", Lovelock's "You Say", and Myers' "Just Skin". McFarlane described No Dance's style, "[they] eschewed the electric rock framework of the musicians' respective bands for a more acoustic and melodic approach". In mid-year Tillett provided piano for Laughing Clowns' album, Ghosts of an Ideal Wife (August 1985).

By late 1984, Tillett was working with another side project, Paris Green, with a core of himself, Raoul Hawkins on bass guitar, and Jeffrey Wegener on drums (ex-Laughing Clowns) joined by "a loose aggregation of musicians". Other musicians included Louis Burdett on drums (ex-Benders) and Charlie Owen on lead guitar (ex-Tango Bravo). According to McFarlane Paris Green "covered material ranging from Mose Allison to John Coltrane, Ray Charles to Nina Simone, and on any given night there was as many as nine or ten musicians on stage". Tillett (on piano) and Fisher worked on Ed Kuepper's debut solo album, Electrical Storm (June 1985).

Tillett, Fisher and Ikinger revived The Wet Taxis in January 1986, with Rod Howard on bass guitar, Jason Kain on lead guitar (ex-Relatives), and Bronstantine Karlarka on keyboards. By May, they were joined by a brass section of Dianne Spence on saxophone, Kathy Wemyss on trumpet (both ex-Laughing Clowns), and Gladys Reed on trombone. Reed had backed No Dance on Carnival of Souls. In July, Tillett described his three newest members to Sutton, "[t]here are so many hot female musicians in Sydney and none seem to be getting a go. It is not just a gimmick". The Wet Taxis supported a tour by Nico and undertook other tours. In May 1987, they issued a single, "Sailor's Dream", which was produced by Rob Younger (of Radio Birdman, New Christs) at Paradise Studios for Citadel Records. The band broke up by mid-year.

Tillett recorded his debut solo album, Ego Tripping at the Gates of Hell, with bandmates Ikinger and Spence; Burdett and Owen (both now ex-New Christs); and with Lenny Bastiaans on bass guitar. Tillett co-produced with Bruce Callaway, it was issued on Citadel Records during November 1987. McFarlane felt its style was a mix of "jazz, blues, R&B, pop and rock, making for fascinating and engrossing listening". Tillett told Stuart Coupe of The Canberra Times his motivation, "[it] was to play songs within a wide spectrum, everything from a full band through to a duet. It gets away from the expectations that people have with me of it always sounding like Wet Taxis". To promote his album, Tillett assembled a backing band, The Ego Trippers from Hell, and toured Australia.

In 1989, Tillett briefly joined Catfish, Don Walker's side-project, on vocals. Also in that year Tillett fronted The Aspersion Caste, aka Louis Tillett and His Cast of Aspersions, with Bastiaans, Burdett, Ikinger (by then ex-Kings of the World) and Owen; they were joined by Miroslav Bukovsky on trumpet, James Greening on trombone, and Jason Morphett on saxophone. The group released a single, "Condemned to Live", in January 1990 on the Blue Mosque label, which was distributed by Festival Records. McFarlane felt it displayed "astonishing gut-bucket blues that packed a considerable punch". In 1989, Tillett also contributed piano to the debut single from Sydney band Bughouse.

In April 1990, the parent album, A Cast of Aspersions, followed on Blue Mosque/Festival Records which was co-produced by Tillett and Owen. It was "another eclectic set of material driven by Tillett's booming baritone voice and smouldering organ, Owen's jagged guitar lines and the swinging brass arrangements" according to McFarlane. The Canberra Times' Penelope Layland was "let down by the lyrics" while his "musicianship is impeccable, his melding of jazz and rock is imaginative and perfectly executed", however "[c]annibals and witches populate Tillett's songs, and these characters indulge in an array of unspeakable pagan rites ... the lyrics seem to be aimed at kids at a slumber party, trying to outscare each other with horror stories". Tillett and The Aspersion Caste toured Australian and then Europe.

By 1991, The Aspersion Caste line-up was Fisher and Spence with Jackie Orszaczky on bass guitar (ex-Syrius) and Colin Watson on guitar. Orszaczky was soon replaced by Damian Kennedy on bass guitar. The backing group were disbanded in the next year as Tillett worked on his solo album, Letters to a Dream (October 1992), which he co-produced with Barry Wolfison. Bevan Hannan writing for The Canberra Times finds "[t]he instrumentals are infatuating, perhaps long-winded at times, but to Tillett's credit he sustains the mood, mainly due to the absence of electronics and a rhythm section. His bold operatic voice is engaging and he works an interesting interplay with backing singer Mary-Ellen Stringer".

In June 1993, Tillett (on piano, Hammond organ, vocals and percussion) and Owen (on guitar and percussion) recorded an album, The Ugly Truth, with Owen producing. It was released in 1994 on Return to Sender/Normal Records. The pair released a second album together, Midnight Rain, in October 1995, which was produced by Tony Cohen. For that album Tillett provided lead vocals, piano, Hammond organ, Roland synthesiser and soprano saxophone. The pair toured in support of the album. Midnight Rain won the Rolling Stone Critics Award for Best Album of 1996. Later that year Tillett and Owen joined Tex Perkins' backing band on a promotional tour for the latter's debut solo album, Far Be It from Me (August 1996).

Louis Tillett died on 6 August 2023, at the age of 64.

== Discography ==
=== Albums ===
List of albums, with selected details
Title	Details
Ego Tripping At the Gates of Hell	Released: November 1987; Format: CD, LP, cassette; Label: Citadel Records (CITLP 509)
A Cast of Aspersions	Released: April 1990; Format: CD, LP, cassette; Label: Blue Mosque/Festival Records (D 30227)
Letters to a Dream	Released: October 1992; Format: CD, LP, cassette; Label: Blue Mosque/Festival Records (D 30877)
The Ugly Truth (with Charlie Owen)	Released: 1994; Format: CD; Label: Return to Sender (RTS 05)
Midnight Rain (with Charlie Owen)	Released: 1995; Format: CD; Label: Return to Sender (RTS 18)
Cry Against the Faith	Released: 1998; Format: CD; Label: Normal (NORMAL 212)
Learning to Die	Released: 2001; Format: CD; Label: Normal (NORMAL 222)
Live @ The Basement	Released: 2001; Format: CD (limited); Label: Return to Sender (RTS 31)
The Hanged Man	Released: 2005; Format: CD, digital; Label: Normal (NORMAL 283)
Soliloquy	Released: 2006; Format: CD; Label: ORIGiN (OR 089)
To Ride a Dead Pony	Released: April 2018; Format: Digital; Label: Louis Tillett Music; Note: Compilation album
