= Rooms of the Magnificent =

Studio album by Ed Kuepper
- Released: September 1986
- Recorded: 1986
- Studio: Digital Audio Studios, Sydney, New South Wales
- Genre: Alternative rock
- Label: Hot Records
- Producer: Ed Kuepper

Ed Kuepper chronology
Electrical Storm (1985)	Rooms of the Magnificent (1986)	Everybody's Got To (1988)

Rooms of the Magnificent is the second solo album by Australian guitarist and songwriter Ed Kuepper recorded in 1986 and released on the Hot label. The album reunited Kuepper with members of the Laughing Clowns and featured pianist Chris Abrahams of The Necks.

Described as Kuepper's most accessible album to date, the first single, "Also Sprach the King of Eurodisco", received strong airplay on national broadcaster Triple J and some on commercial radio.

== Track listing ==
All writing by Ed Kuepper.

1. "Rooms of the Magnificent" – 2:36
2. "Also Sprach the King of Eurodisco" – 4:52
3. "Sea Air" – 3:25
4. "The Sixteen Days – 3:14
5. "Without Your Mirror" – 3:58
6. "No Point in Working" – 2:53
7. "I Am Your Prince" – 2:44
8. "Spent Five Years" – 1:57
9. "Show Pony" – 5:01
10. "Nothing You Can Do" – 3:07

== Personnel ==
- Ed Kuepper – vocals, electric guitar, acoustic guitar
- Paul Smith – bass
- Mark Dawson – drums, percussion
- Michael Arthur – harmonica
- Melanie Oxley – backing vocals
- Chris Abrahams – piano, organ
- Glad Reed – trombone
- Diane Spence – saxophone
- Kathy Wemyss – trumpet

Technical

- Mick Olesh – recording engineer
- Alana Sowman, Mick Olesh – mixing engineer
- Judi Dransfield – cover art and layout

== Charts ==
Chart performance for Rooms of the Magnificent
Chart (1987)	Peak position
Australian Albums (Kent Music Report)	98
