= Jean Lee (murderer) =

Australian murderer

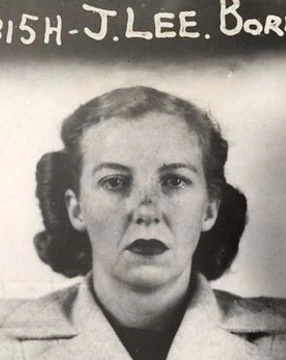
- Lee after her arrest (November 1949)
- Born: Marjorie Jean Maude Wright; 10 December 1919; Dubbo, New South Wales, Australia
- Died: 19 February 1951 (aged 31); HM Prison Pentridge, Victoria, Australia
- Other names: Marjorie Jean Brees, Mrs. H. Pearce, Jean Deacon, Jean White, Marie Williams, Marjorie Lee, Jean Duncan, Jean Brown, Jean Smith, 'Skinny Jean', Mesha Vetos
- Status: Executed by hanging
- Conviction: Murder
- Penalty: Death

Jean Lee (10 December 1919 – 19 February 1951) was an Australian murderer who, together with her lover Robert Clayton and accomplice Norman Andrews, was convicted for the 1949 killing of William 'Pop' Kent, an SP bookmaker from the Melbourne suburb of Carlton. The victim was bound to a chair, tortured with the aim of finding hidden money, and finally strangled. All three were convicted and sentenced to death in March 1950. They were hanged eleven months later at Pentridge Gaol. Lee was the last woman to be executed in Australia.

== Biography ==
=== Early life ===
Jean Lee was born Marjorie Jean Maude Wright in Dubbo, New South Wales, on 10 December 1919, the youngest child of Charles Wright and Florence (née Peacock). Marjorie's father was a railway worker and the Wright family was described as "highly respectable". In 1927, the family re-located to the Sydney suburb of Chatswood, where Marjorie attended Chatswood Public School, a convent in North Sydney and Willoughby Central Domestic High School.

Marjorie learned shorthand and typing in her last few years at school, though she did not sit her Intermediate certificate examinations. Her first job was as an office junior at a motor company on William Street in Chatswood. She had a number of subsequent jobs as a milliner, a stenographer and a labourer in a canned-goods factory.

=== Marriage ===
In March 1938 Marjorie, aged 18, married a house-painter named Raymond Brees, who was seven years her senior and had reportedly known her "since girlhood". The marriage was beset by financial difficulties, as Brees was regularly unemployed and drinking heavily. In July 1939, several months after Marjorie had given birth to a daughter, Brees was convicted of auto theft and received three months' suspended sentence, subject to a two-year good behaviour bond. Following the start of Second World War, Brees enlisted in the Second Australian Imperial Force, serving in the 1st Australian Heavy Anti-Aircraft Artillery Training Regiment. He was subject to court-martial proceedings in August 1944.

Between 1942 and 1943, Marjorie and Brees separated. As a single mother, Marjorie struggled to provide for herself and her daughter; she eventually entrusted the care of the child to her mother. Towards the end of 1942, Marjorie travelled by overnight train to Brisbane and found a job as a waitress at Lennon's Hotel.

=== Prostitution ===
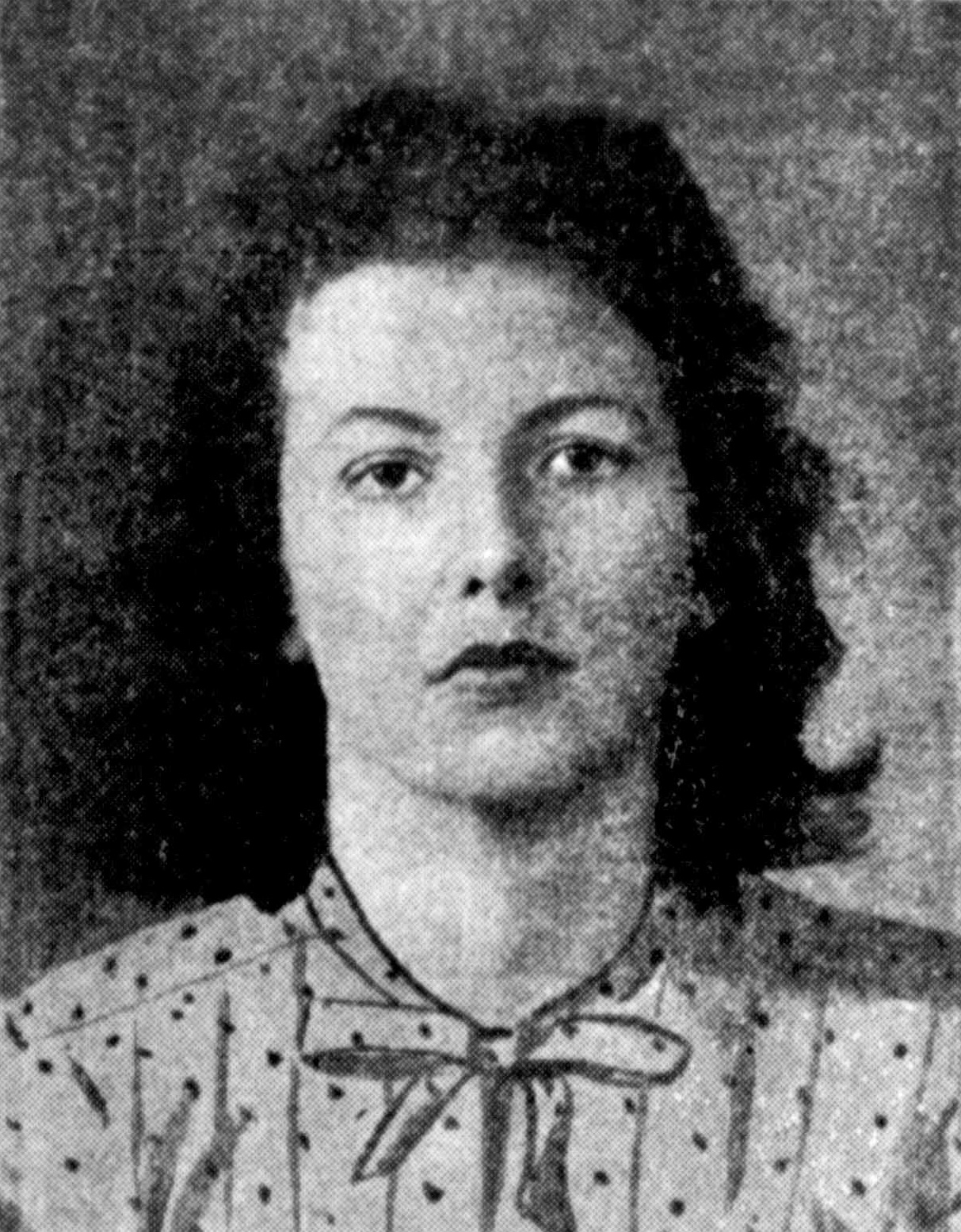
An image of Jean Lee, probably from 1943 (published in Perth's The Mirror newspaper, 17 February 1951).

In late 1943, towards the end of her period in Brisbane, Marjorie met a man named Morris Dias, described as "a superficially charming but vicious petty criminal". She lived "precariously" with Dias for about three years, moving with him to Sydney and then Adelaide. In February 1944, the couple flew to Perth and booked into a hotel under the surname 'Pearce'.

On 8 March 1944, two detectives interviewed Marjorie at a house on Newcastle Street in Perth. She initially told them her name was 'H. Pearce', but when further questioned she divulged her true identity; she was subsequently charged with using a false name and fined two pounds. Dias was himself prosecuted for using a false name and an older charge of vagrancy, from when he had brought a prostitute named Wilson from Queensland to Western Australia in late 1939 and stayed in Kalgoorlie for three months. He was convicted of the old charge, but released on a £50 good behaviour bond.

Marjorie and Dias remained in Perth for about eleven months, a period in which she "first began to take to drink" and Dias started occasionally "bashing her about". When later asked why she didn't leave Dias, she responded: "It wasn't easy during the war to get away from Perth." When they eventually left in 1945, they travelled to Sydney. Soon after their arrival, Dias was arrested on outstanding charges. Marjorie was forced to work as a prostitute to pay for her lover's "bails and other things".

Marjorie worked in the Kings Cross and Darlinghurst areas of Sydney, with Dias as her protector or 'bludger' (Australian underworld slang for a person who lives on the earnings of a prostitute). She worked on the streets, or occasionally in a brothel, and was earning between £15 and £20 a night. She used numerous aliases in multiple encounters with police for 'offensive behaviour' (prostitution), including 'Jean Lee'. Between May 1945 and July 1948, she appeared at Sydney's Central Police Court on twenty-three occasions.

In 1946, Lee and Dias left Sydney for Tasmania, probably in an effort to escape police attention. There, Lee ended her relationship with Dias and returned to Sydney. She resumed working as a prostitute and was drinking heavily. In August 1946, she got a job as a barmaid in the Liverpool Arms Hotel, at the corner of Pitt and King streets, and was working behind the bar during the day and in a brothel at night. It was during this period of her life that she met Robert Clayton.

=== With Clayton ===
In late 1946, Lee met Robert David Clayton, with whom she formed an enduring, and occasionally violent, relationship. Clayton had served in the Royal Australian Air Force as a stores clerk during the war, but he was subject to disciplinary action for frequent absences without leave and was dismissed from the service in January 1941. He briefly joined the Second Australian Imperial Force but was subject to further disciplinary charges and was discharged in 1943. Clayton had been married, but was divorced by 1945.

In April 1946, prior to meeting Lee, Clayton had been convicted of four charges of theft and one of false pretenses in the Sydney Central Criminal Court. The charges related to a racket he had carried out by answering advertisements from women seeking to rent a flat. He met up with them in hotels and obtained money by claiming "that rent was required in advance before the keys were handed over". The magistrate sentenced Clayton to six months' gaol, but indicated he would recommend his release at the expiration of two months providing he had made full restitution by that time.

As his relationship with Lee developed, Clayton took on the role as her 'bludger' and "settled down to the comforts and affluence of poncing on her". He used the money earned by Lee to sustain a developing gambling habit. For Lee, however, Clayton was "the one real love of her life", despite his shortcomings and occasional aggressive behaviour. Even as she awaited execution, in her conversations with the prison matron, Lee spoke of "her Bobby" in eulogistic terms, contrasting him favourably with Brees and Dias.

In November 1946, Lee and Clayton went to stay with Lee's mother, then living in Toukley, north of Sydney. However, Clayton had little tolerance for the domesticity of the household and the presence of Lee's young daughter. During their stay, Clayton and an acquaintance named Norman Bolger (alias Stanton) met two young women, aged 17 and 18, who were staying in a holiday cabin at Toukley, owned by one of the girl's parents. On the evening of 3 December, Clayton and Bolger drove the girls to a remote location near Norah Head and attempted to rape one of them. The girls managed to escape and notify police.

On 23 December Clayton, Lee^{[A]}, Bolger and a woman named Sylvia White were apprehended in a stolen motor vehicle outside Condobolin. Two detectives from Newcastle detained Clayton and Bolger for the Norah Head assault, but the two women were admitted to bail. The two men were convicted at the Newcastle Quarter Sessions in May 1947 – Clayton of indecent assault, and Bolger of indecent assault and common assault. Clayton was sentenced to imprisonment of twenty-one months, cumulative on the eighteen months he was already serving for false pretences and stealing. It was disclosed at trial that both Clayton and Bolger were living with de facto wives (Lee and Sylvia White).

After Clayton's arrest, Lee returned to work as a prostitute. It was during the period of Clayton's trial and imprisonment that she incurred most of her convictions for prostitution, the last charge for 'offensive behaviour' being in March 1948 in Sydney. Prostitution charges typically involved a fine of £2 (or four days incarceration in default). Lee also worked as a waitress in a café on Pitt Street, and was reported to have cared for a paraplegic American serviceman in Darlinghurst. The serviceman was eventually flown back to the U.S. by his parents, but continued to write to Lee after his return.

Raymond Brees initiated divorce proceedings against Lee in 1948, which were finalised in June that year. Lee regularly visited Clayton at Long Bay Gaol, but during these visits he "was sullen, full of self-pity, and critical of almost anything she told him about her day-to-day life outside".

Clayton was released in September 1949. For a short period the couple operated a blackmail racket, known in America as the 'badger game' and in Australia as the 'ginger game'. The scam involved Clayton stealing a car which he parked in a quiet spot near a hotel. After Lee had enticed a prospective client into the car and gotten him into a sexually compromising position, Clayton would appear as the 'wronged husband' and, threatening "a sordid divorce action with the man as co-respondent", demand compensation. If the man was married, this threat alone would usually ensure compliance.

=== The murder ===
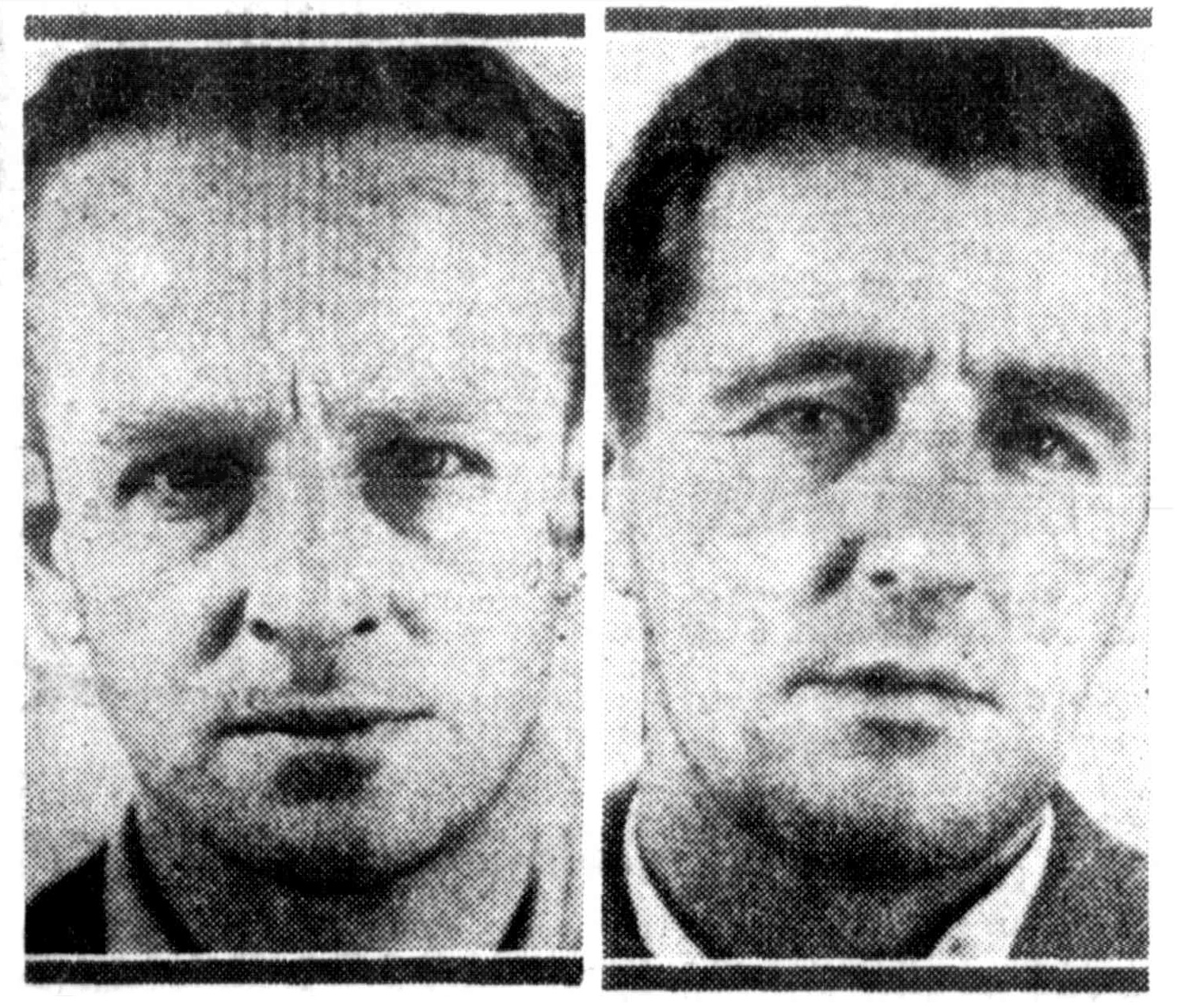
Robert Clayton (left) and Norman Andrews (right), published in Sydney's Truth newspaper, 18 February 1951.

By early October 1949 Lee and Clayton had gathered £250 from prostitution and 'ginger' game scamming and they decided to travel to Melbourne for a working holiday during the spring racing fixtures. Lee and Clayton travelled from Sydney to Melbourne on 14 October 1949, the day before the Caulfield Cup. They initially booked into Carlyon's Hotel in Spencer-street and embarked on a round of attending race-meetings and nightclubs, punctuated by bouts of hard drinking. As their funds dwindled they booked into the more modest Duke of Windsor Hotel in Prahran. In order to replenish their funds Lee and Clayton worked the 'badger' game. On one occasion the intended victim fought back and repulsed Clayton; back at the hotel he "took out his anger and humiliation" on Lee, hitting her and giving her a bruise under one eye and a gash on the top of her nose. At the Werribee Cup race meeting on October 26 the couple met up with Norman Andrews, another Sydney criminal who Clayton had known from his stint in Long Bay. Andrews (real name Norman Anthes) had flown to Melbourne on October 18.

On the afternoon of November 7 Lee, Clayton and Andrews were drinking at the University Hotel, on the corner of Grattan and Lygon streets in Carlton, when an elderly man began speaking to Lee. The man was William 'Pop' Kent, a 73-year-old SP bookmaker, who lived nearby in Dorrit-street. The three began drinking with Kent, with Lee acting flirtatiously towards the old man. Lee told Kent she was a dancer named Mesha Vetos, and her companions were her brother and his mate. When Kent paid for drinks it was observed by his drinking companions that he peeled off the money from a thick roll of notes bound with an elastic band that he kept in the fob-pocket of his trousers. When the bar closed at 6 p.m. the SP bookmaker invited the three strangers back to his place for drinks.

Kent lived in the front room of 'Mallow House' at 50 Dorrit-street. The building operated as a boarding-house, with Kent as the landlord. When they arrived Kent opened a bottle of white port and handed out glasses. Kent sat on a cane armchair, Lee and Clayton were side-by-side on the bed and Andrews sat in one of the two wooden chairs in the room. When Andrews first sat down, a leg of the chair gave way and sent him sprawling to the floor; he then sat in the remaining intact chair. Within a short time the conversation between Lee and Kent again became flirtatious, and during a discussion about her weight, Lee rose from the bed and sat on the old man's lap. Early in the evening another resident of the apartments, James Conole, briefly visited Kent's apartment where he witnessed Lee sitting on Kent's lap and all those in the room drinking wine.

After Conole left, Clayton and Andrews also departed from the room for about twenty minutes, leaving Lee to try to gain access to the roll of banknotes in Kent's fob-pocket. Feigning intimacy with the old man she fumbled about, but was unable to get at the money "below the folds of his bulging belly". She undid his shirt, unbuttoned his fly and took his penis in her mouth, but no matter what she tried she couldn't extract the money. After Clayton and Andrews had walked slowly around the block, they knocked and entered the room where Kent was looking dishevelled and Lee was back on his lap. Lee then left to use the toilet in the backyard. Clayton followed her out of the room and they agreed for her to make another attempt, but this time Lee would try to take Kent's trousers off.

Clayton and Andrews left the room again and Lee recommenced working on the old man, but this time Kent was on his guard. As she tried to loosen his pants he pushed her away. Frustrated and angry, Lee grabbed an empty wine bottle and hit the old man on his head, the force of which broke the bottle and cut her finger. She then picked up the leg of the chair Andrews had broken earlier in the evening and started beating Kent about the head and body. Hearing the noises, the two men lurking in the hallway returned to the room. They tore a strip from a sheet and tied Kent's hands behind his body, passing the strip up and around his neck. The roll of notes was cut from his pocket and the three then systematically ransacked the room searching for more money. When none was found, in impotent fury they commanded Kent to tell them where further money was hidden, and persisted on this track despite his denials of its existence. Kent's thumbs were tied together with his shoe-laces and for about the next hour Clayton and Andrews tortured him, "ignoring his frantic pleas for mercy". They slashed him about the face with a pocket-knife and pressed burning cigarettes onto his chest and back. They punched and kicked him "until he lay in a twitching blood-soaked heap on the floor".

The beatings stopped when Mary McWilliam, a neighbour from across the street, knocked at the door. McWilliam was accustomed to join Kent for a few drinks most nights of the week. Andrews opened the door, eased into the passage and closed the door behind him. While Andrews told the neighbour they were having a "private party", Clayton was choking 'Pop' Kent in an effort to stop him from calling out. By the time Andrews returned to the room Kent was dead. As Lee and the two men tried to work out what to do about their situation, there was another knock at the door. May Howard, who lived in an adjoining apartment, had been hearing muffled noises during the evening. She was aware that Kent had visitors and could hear their comings and goings. She became suspicious when the noises and conversation suddenly ceased, but there had been no sound of the strangers leaving. The silence convinced Howard that something was amiss so she went and knocked on Kent's door and called out to her neighbour and landlord; after there was no answer she turned the knob of the locked door. Deeply suspicious, Howard left the building by the backyard and walked down the lane and back into Dorrit-street to get a view of Kent's window facing the street. Soon afterwards, Lee, Clayton and Andrews left the room in darkness and locked the door behind them. In the hallway Clayton called out, "Good night Pop, see you tomorrow". In the street, May Howard watched as the three strangers departed from the boarding house. After the strangers had left, Howard spoke to Bill Symons, another resident of the boarding-house, and together they knocked on Kent's door. When there was no answer, they decided to call the police. Symons was a one-legged war veteran, so it was Howard that walked to the public phone in Lygon-street and called the Carlton police station. When the police entered the apartment they found Kent's body partially covered by a bloodied sheet and other items in the ransacked room, his hands and feet bound with strips of sheeting and his thumbs tied together with a bootlace.

After Lee, Clayton and Andrews had left Kent's apartment at around 9 p.m. they stopped at a phone booth and Clayton phoned Trans Australia Airlines (TAA) and booked three seats to Adelaide for the 7 a.m. flight the next morning. They then travelled by taxi to their rooms in the Great Southern Hotel in Spencer-street, where they changed out of their blood-stained clothing. Andrews joined the other two in the larger room where they drank a bottle of dry sherry. Then they took a taxi to the TAA office in Swanston-street where Clayton and Andrews paid for the flights to Adelaide, while Lee waited outside in the taxi. After obtaining the tickets they asked the taxi-driver where they could go to drink beer and were taken to the Copacabana nightclub in Collins-street, arriving there at about midnight. Lee later gave evidence that they "stayed there until I was the worse for drink and was asked to leave".

=== Murder charges ===
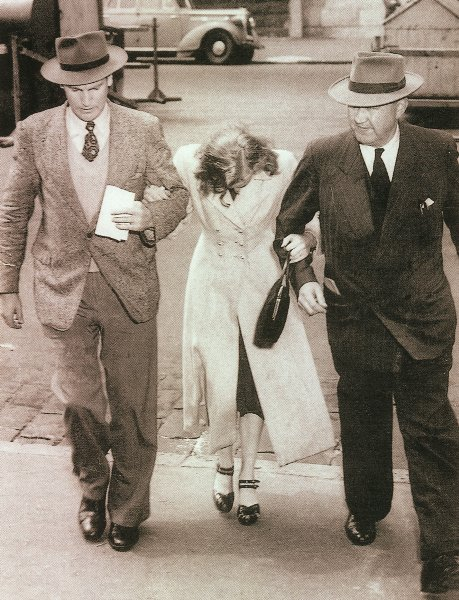
Jean Lee, escorted by detectives after her arrest in Melbourne in November 1949.

When detectives arrived at the scene of 'Pop' Kent's murder they immediately set about the task of assessing the situation, interviewing witnesses and searching for evidence to identify the perpetrators of the crime. With descriptions of the woman and two men obtained from the boarding-house occupants and other residents of Dorrit-street, as well as staff of the University Hotel, detectives began a systematic check of hotels in the inner-city district, interviewing desk-clerks and night porters in the early hours of the morning. At about 3.40 a.m. detectives entered the Great Southern private hotel near the Spencer-street railway station. Upon hearing descriptions of the three suspects, the night porter told the police about three guests who had taken rooms the previous day, a Mr. and Mrs. Lee in a double room and a Mr. Andrews in a single room. The three had arrived back at the hotel the previous evening for a few hours, but then called a taxi and gone out again. With the strong belief these were the three suspects, detectives used the room keys to search the rooms. In the double room they found a blood-stained blue coat and skirt and a man's shirt with blood-stains on the cuff. In the single room was another blood-spotted shirt hanging over a chair. The detectives then settled down to wait in the hotel lobby. At about 4.20 a.m. Lee and her two companions arrived back at the Great Southern in an inebriated state and were apprehended by the waiting detectives. They were conveyed to Russell Street headquarters in separate cars and put into three different interview rooms for questioning.

At the beginning of the questioning Lee refused to answer any questions (as she was entitled to do), and despite further questioning, Lee maintained her resistance. When detectives showed and read to Lee a statement made by Clayton, implicating her and Andrews in the murder, she "became unbalanced emotionally" and said "that if her lover wanted it that way, he could have it". She then made a statement "exculpating him, and accepting the whole blame for Kent's murder", stating she had bashed the old man over the head with a bottle. Afterwards she "recovered her original possession, and resumed her reticent attitude", denying any wrongdoing, and claiming she had made the statement to "get peace and quiet".

Andrews, Clayton and Lee were charged with Kent's murder and remanded in custody. An inquest into Kent's death was held at the Melbourne Coroner's Court on November 30. During the presentation of evidence it was reported that on a number of occasions "the three defendants grinned at witnesses and joked among themselves". At the conclusion of the inquest the City Coroner found that Kent had died from "asphyxsia, caused by compression and fracture of the larynx, wilfully, feloniously, and maliciously caused by Jean Lee, 29, Robert David Clayton, 28, and Norman Andrews, 35, all of Woollahra, Sydney". The coroner committed the three prisoners for trial. On December 14 the counsel for the defence successfully applied for an adjournment of the trial until February as the three accused "required time to raise funds and arrange other matters for their defence".

=== Trials ===
The trial of Clayton, Andrews and Lee, charged with Kent's murder, commenced on Monday, 20 March 1950, in the Melbourne Criminal Court before Justice Gavan Duffy. On days three and four of the trial, each of the defendants took the stand and denied they had done anything violent to Kent or had robbed him. They claimed Kent was well when they left him. When Lee was asked about the bloodstained coat and skirt found in her room, she said she had had a nose-bleed earlier that day. When Clayton was asked why he had made a statement when first arrested implicating Lee, a person he claimed to love, in the murder, he replied, "I suppose I turned like yellow dog". He admitted he made the statement "to get himself out of trouble" and he did not think it would hurt the others "because they were all innocent". The trial concluded on Saturday morning, March 25. After retiring for two-and-a-half hours the jury returned guilty verdicts for each of the accused prisoners. Lee collapsed into Clayton's arms on being proclaimed guilty. When Justice Gavan Duffy passed sentences of death on all three, Lee sobbed, "I didn't do it. I didn't do it", and collapsed screaming. When Clayton was asked if he had anything to say as to why sentence of death should not be passed upon him, he advanced to the rail of the dock and shouted at the judge, "What I could say would fill a book", before turning to the jury and crying out, "You pack of idiots". When Andrews was asked if he had anything to say, he turned to Justice Gavan Duffy and replied: "Not at this juncture, no". Clayton, who was attending to Lee, then turned to the jury and shouted, "May your next meal choke you, you swine". After further outbursts he leaned over the rail of the dock and spat at the jury. The judge then directed that the three prisoners be removed from the court.

On 19 May 1950 the Court of Criminal Appeal, by a majority decision, quashed the convictions of Lee, Clayton and Andrews and ordered a re-trial so that the admissibility of statements made to the police by the accused could be reviewed. Two of the three judges criticised police methods of interrogation and held that some of the statements were obtained by improper methods. When the decision was announced, in the dock Lee "violently embraced" Clayton.

In June 1950 the Crown appealed to the High Court and the convictions were upheld by a unanimous decision. The three convicted murderers then sought to appeal to the Privy Council and requested State financial aid to do so. This was refused by the State Cabinet on July 17.

On 12 December 1950 the State Cabinet of the Country Party government confirmed the sentence of death imposed on the three prisoners and a date was set for their executions. On the following day a deputation of the Labor Women's Organising Committee met with the Victorian Premier, John McDonald, to protest against the decision, in particular seeking a reprieve for Lee.

=== Executions ===
Lee's mental state declined after this, and she alternated between violently attacking her prison guards and begging for mercy, while stating repeatedly that she was innocent and that they had never meant to kill anyone. Lee also commented that she did not believe a woman would be hanged. As the date for her execution drew near, she grew increasingly erratic.

Lee received her last visit on the Saturday before her execution, when three friends from Sydney spent half an hour with her before flying back home. Andrew's wife and Clayton's mother, both from Sydney, visited the two condemned men on Sunday afternoon.

Jean Lee was hanged at Pentridge Prison at 8 o'clock on Monday morning, 19 February 1951. She was carried from her cell to the gallows by the executioner and his assistant. Wearing a hood, with her hands handcuffed in front of her, she was placed on a chair before the sentence was carried out. One report stated that Lee "appeared to be unconscious when she was executed".

Robert Clayton and Norman Andrews were hanged together two hours after Lee's execution. The two men were reported to have "met their deaths calmly and steadily". As they were seated together on the scaffold, Andrews said in a firm voice: "Goodbye Robert". Clayton replied softly: "Goodbye Charlie" (his nickname for Andrews).

The three bodies were buried in the gaol graveyard reserved for executed prisoners.

Jean Lee was the last woman to be executed in Australia.

== The accomplices ==
- Robert David Clayton – born on 22 January 1917 at Paddington, the son of Robert Clayton and Florence (née Richards). After leaving school Clayton worked as clerk for Schweppes Ltd. in Sydney. In October 1939 he enlisted in the Royal Australian Air Force as a stores clerk. From May 1940 Clayton was subject to disciplinary action, detention and forfeiture of pay for frequent absences without leave and failing to obey orders. On 16 August 1940 Clayton married Nancy Lewis at Woollahra. By December 1940 the Airforce had determined that Clayton's "retention in the Service is undesirable". He was formally discharged from the RAAF in January 1941. In August 1941 Clayton enlisted in the Australian Imperial Force and was mobilised to Palestine with the Sixth Division. He was not involved in active service in the Middle East and was returned to Australia in 1942 as part of the deployment of troops to meet the threat of Japan's entry into the war. When he reached Sydney Clayton's wife, who was in a relationship with an American airman, told him their marriage was over. After this "blow to his pride" Clayton was hospitalised at Concord for four months suffering from "anxiety neurosis". After rejoining his unit he was absent without leave on a number of occasions and placed in detention at various times. Divorce proceedings were initiated in 1943 and Clayton was subject to court martial proceedings based on his military service record. He was discharged from the AIF in December 1943. Nancy and Robert Clayton were divorced in 1945.
- Norman Thomas Anthes – was born on 29 May 1910 at Orange, the son of William Anthes and Mary (née Crampton). Anthes worked as an electrician and projectionist. He married Mildred Fuller in April 1931 at Parramatta and a daughter was born to the couple in November that year. By about 1935 the marriage had fallen apart and Anthes adopted an itinerant lifestyle, working in a variety of jobs. Mildred and Norman Anthes divorced in June 1936. By 1940 Anthes had been convicted of fifteen offences, including stealing, receiving stolen goods and breaching bail conditions. He enlisted in the Australian Imperial Force in July 1940 and served in the Australian Depot Battalion in the Middle East and as a signalman in the 9th Division. At Tobruk he received minor injuries from a shell explosion and spent time in a military hospital. Anthes was court-martialled on four occasions during his military service (October 1941, April 1943, October 1943 and April 1944). In April 1943 at his court-martial in Sydney on a charge of being absent without leave, Anthes "dramatically exclaimed that if he had had a gun he might now be standing his trial for murder". He added that "he found that his wife was living with another man and he had gone from Queensland to Wagga seeking divorce evidence". In early 1944 Anthes robbed and assaulted a civilian, for which he was charged in March 1944 and sentenced to three years gaol. He was formally discharged from the Army soon afterwards. When he was released from Long Bay in May 1946 Anthes joined the crew of a vessel going to New Zealand, where he deserted. After about a year in New Zealand he was deported back to Sydney. In August 1947 Anthes was charged with breaking and entering and sentenced to eighteen months in Long Bay where he met Robert Clayton. In July 1949, soon after his release, Anthes faced stealing charges. In September he was charged with two counts of assault and other offenses, for which he was fined £22 (or 42 days in prison in default). Anthes was known under the aliases of Andrews, Johnson and Clarke and was described by police "as an associate of the worst type of criminal". He regularly frequented nightclubs, billiard saloons and two-up schools and was a heavy drinker. On 18 October 1949 Anthes, by now calling himself Norman Andrews, flew to Melbourne and a week later met up with Clayton and Lee at the Werribee Cup race meeting.

== The victim ==
William George Kent was born on 23 October 1874 at Moonambel, Victoria, the eldest child of William Kent and Caroline (née Spencer). As a young man Kent was a jockey in the Wimmera district of western Victoria. On one occasion in about 1892 he rode the winners in the hurdle, handicap and trial stakes at a race meeting at Warracknabeal. His brother, Jack Kent, was a successful jockey at metropolitan race meetings and was killed in a fall during a race in Perth on New Year's Day 1908. After his riding days had finished William Kent remained a keen racing enthusiast and owned racehorses. Kent and Florence Anderson were married in 1903 at Bendigo and had nine children born between 1904 and 1920. Kent and his family lived at various localities in the Western and Wimmera districts of Victoria. In about the mid-1920s he was the licensee of the Hopetoun House Hotel at Jeparit. Kent was the proprietor of Mac's Royal Mail Hotel at Warracknabeal from January 1927 until late 1928, after which he and his family relocated to Melbourne. By about 1944 Kent was living apart from his wife and operating a boarding-house ('Mallow House') at 50 Dorrit-street, Carlton. Kent also conducted an illicit business as starting-price (SP) bookmaker at the nearby University Hotel, where he drank regularly, especially on Mondays to settle up bets after the weekend races. Kent, known locally as 'Pop', was murdered by Lee, Clayton and Andrews on 7 November 1949 in his room at Carlton. Kent was buried in Melbourne General Cemetery in Carlton on November 9. His estate was valued for probate purposes at £274.6s.5p, of which £100 was the goodwill from his boarding-house business. Kent's widow, Florence, died in 1970 at Bendigo, Victoria, aged 90 years.

== In popular culture ==
In 1998, a verse novel by Jordie Albiston of Jean Lee's life, The Hanging of Jean Lee, was published.

Albiston's verse novel became the basis of a musical, The Hanging of Jean Lee, with a score written by Australian composer Andree Greenwell. The musical played at Sydney Opera House in 2006 featuring singers Max Sharam and Hugo Race.

Lee's life and crimes was the subject of a 2007 album by Australian rock musician Ed Kuepper, Jean Lee and the Yellow Dog.

The ghost of Jean Lee, portrayed by Max Sharam, appears in the 2020 docudrama A Miscarriage of Justice, based on the hanging of Ronald Ryan.

Jean Lee was featured in an episode entitled "Match Made For Murder" in Season 5 of the true crime television series Deadly Women, first aired in January 2012. In the re-enactment, Jean is portrayed by Australian actress and director Kate Ryerson. Robert Clayton was portrayed by Paul Godfrey, and William 'Pop' Kent is played by Stephen Bourke.

== Notes ==
A.There are two newspaper references to the female companions of Clayton and Bolger arrested near Condobolin in the stolen car, both from the Lachlander and Condobolin and Western Districts Recorder. The first reference, an account of the arrests, names the women as "Jean Press... and Sylvia Dulcie White". The later reference, referring to both women failing to appear in court and the forfeiture of their bail, names the women as "Jean Breast and Sylvia Dulcie White". Jean 'Press' or 'Breast' are references to Jean Brees.
