= Shane Richardson (rugby league) =

Australian rugby league administrator

Shane Richardson is a respected Sports Administrator from Australia. Richardson is the former CEO of National Rugby League teams Wests Tigers, Penrith Panthers, South Sydney Rabbitohs and Cronulla-Sutherland Sharks, as well as Hull FC in the English Super League. Additionally, Richardson was once the NRL's Chief Strategist and also led the unsuccessful Western Corridor bid in the late 2010's.

Richardson attended Corinda State High School in Queensland, prior to becoming the State Manager of Australian Guarantee Corporation in 1976

After a stint in the BRL, he started his NRL career with Cronulla in 1993, staying for five years before joining Hull F.C. in the English Super League. He returned to Australia in 2002.

== Career ==
=== Penrith Panthers ===
Richardson, alongside coach John Lang guided the Penrith Panthers to their 2003 Premiership, defeating the Sydney Roosters. Halfway through the 2004 season, Richardson left the Penrith club for the South Sydney Rabbitohs. John Lang later coached the Rabbitohs for the 2010 and 2011 seasons for 48 games, winning 22, after taking over from Jason Taylor

=== South Sydney Rabbitohs ===
Richardson had previously served as the Chief Executive Officer as well as General Manager of the South Sydney club from July 2004 until March 2015, with his administration culminating in the Rabbitohs’ 21st premiership in 2014. He rejoined the club in 2016 from the NRL, where he had served as the head of game strategy and development.

=== Wests Tigers ===
On 2 July 2024, Richardson started a four-year deal as CEO of the Wests Tigers. On 8 December 2025, Richardson stepped down as Wests Tigers CEO after club chairman Barry O'Farrell and three independent directors were terminated from their positions.

Preceded by Ron Willey; 1983–2004	South Sydney Rabbitohs; CEO; 2004–2015	Succeeded by John Lee; 2015–2016
