= Frontierland (album) =

Studio album by Ed Kuepper
- Released: September 1996
- Recorded: 1996
- Genre: Alternative rock
- Label: Hot
- Producer: Ed Kuepper; Phil Punch

Ed Kuepper chronology
Exotic Mail Order Moods (1995)	Frontierland (1996)	Starstruck: Music for Films & Adverts (1996)

Frontierland is the twelfth solo album by Australian guitarist and songwriter Ed Kuepper recorded in 1996 and released on the Hot label.

== Reception ==
Professional ratings
Review scores
Source	Rating
AllMusic	4/5 stars

Frontierland was nominated for an ARIA for the Best Independent Release at the ARIA Music Awards of 1997.

The Allmusic review by Jack Rabid awarded the album 4 stars and states "here we find Kuepper more successfully tackling mood rock... a non-compromising, neo-ambient, warm soundtrack-like post-punk album".

Musician Dave Graney said, "I don't think Ed Kuepper's Frontierland was lauded and respected as the major work of a great songwriter, player, and studio cat that it was."

== Track listing ==
All writing by Ed Kuepper.

1. "All of These Things" – 4:45
2. "Fireman Joe" – 4:23
3. "The Weepin' Willow" – 4:49
4. "How Would You Plead?" – 3:20
5. "M.D.D.P. Limited" – 4:37
6. "Pushin' Fear II" – 6:41
7. "Rough Neck Blues" – 3:20
8. "Someone Told Me" – 3:30
9. "Poor Howard" – 4:59

== Personnel ==
- Ed Kuepper – vocals, electric guitar, acoustic guitar, bass guitar, mandolin
- Charlie Cole – Mellotron, keyboards, military drums
- Clayton Doley – organ, pedal bass
- Jerome – electric bass
- Adam Armstrong (track 5), Paul Burton (track 2) – double bass
- Mark Collins – banjo
- Christian Marsh – chromatic harmonica
- James Greening – trombone, tuba
- Miroslav Bukovsky – trumpet
- Sir Alfonso – loops, samples
- Mark Dawson – drums, octopad
- Phil Hartel – violin (track 1)
- Mark Punch – electric guitar, backing vocals (track 1)
- Chad Wackerman – drums (track 2)
- Paula Punch Singers (track 9), The Sergeants Three (tracks 3 and 6) – backing vocals

== Charts ==
Chart (1996)	Peak position
Australian Albums (ARIA)	103
