= Everybody's Got To =

Studio album by Ed Kuepper
- Released: 1988
- Recorded: February 1988
- Genre: Rock
- Length: 35:54; 52:46 – reissue with bonus tracks
- Label: True Tone Records
- Producer: Ed Kuepper

Ed Kuepper chronology
Rooms of the Magnificent (1986)	Everybody's Got To (1988)	Today Wonder (1990)

Alternative Cover

Everybody's Got To is the third solo album by Australian guitarist and songwriter Ed Kuepper recorded in 1988 and released on the True Tone Records label. The album was re-released in 2005 with four bonus tracks from Kuepper's Happy as Hell EP.

== Details ==
This was Kuepper's last release on Capitol Records in the US. He later said, "They got Everybody's Got To as a finished album, so up until that point, the control was quite reasonable. They were just lax with their promotion. America was where the deal was signed and it was important we had a lot of enthusiasm from head office."

== Reception ==
Professional ratings
Review scores
Source	Rating
AllMusic	4.5/5 stars

The AllMusic review by Dan LeRoy awarded the album 4½ stars and states "this set of tight, polished alt-rock was his best outing of the '80s, and is perhaps his finest album ever... Anyone wanting to explore Kuepper's substantial and often superb back catalog will find Everybody's Got To the perfect place to start".

In 1990, Kuepper said the album was "the biggest-selling record I've done in this country [Australia] - even including the first couple of Saints records. But I still haven't had a gold record in this country."

== Track listing ==
All writing by Ed Kuepper.

1. "Everybody's Got To" – 3:45
2. "Too Many Clues" – 3:07
3. "When There's This Party" – 3:04
4. "Standing in the Cold, in the Rain" – 3:55
5. "Lonely Paradise" – 4:11
6. "Burned My Fingers" – 4:10
7. "Not a Soul Around" – 2:46
8. "Nothing Changes in My House" – 3:33
9. "Spartan Spirituals" – 2:46
10. "No Skin off Your Nose" – 4:30

=== 2005 CD reissue bonus tracks ===
11. "Sometimes" – 4:50
12. "Everything's Fine" – 3:13
13. "Ghost of an Ideal Wife" – 4:03
14. "New Bully in the Town" – 4:46

== Personnel ==
- Ed Kuepper – vocals, electric guitar, acoustic guitar
- Mark Dawson – drums
- Paul Smith – bass guitar
- Rebecca Hancock – vocals, brass
- Jim Bowman – keyboards
- Peter Walsh – background vocals

== Charts ==
Chart performance for Everybody's Got To
Chart (1988)	Peak position
Australian Albums (Australian Music Report)	42
