= I Was a Mail Order Bridegroom =

Studio album by Ed Kuepper
- Released: 1995
- Recorded: 1995
- Studio: Electric Avenue, Sydney, Australia
- Genre: Alternative rock
- Label: Hot
- Producer: Ed Kuepper & Phil Punch

Ed Kuepper chronology
A King in the Kindness Room (1995)	I Was a Mail Order Bridegroom (1995)	Exotic Mail Order Moods (1995)

I Was a Mail Order Bridegroom is the tenth solo album by Australian guitarist and songwriter Ed Kuepper recorded in 1995 and released on the Hot label initially as a mail order only release.

== Reception ==
Professional ratings
Review scores
Source	Rating
AllMusic	4/5 stars

The AllMusic review by Ned Raggett awarded the album 4 stars and states "I Was a Mail Order Bridegroom is one of Ed Kuepper's finest releases, his equivalent of an MTV Unplugged appearance but many times better than the usually dull efforts that implies... Perhaps the best thing about this album is that every song sounds like the best thing Kuepper has ever done while it's playing — high praise, perhaps, but it's the easiest way to capture the disc's lovely, entrancing spirit".

== Track listing ==
All writing by Ed Kuepper, except where indicated.

1. "When She's Down" – 3:39
2. "The Way I Made You Feel" – 4:18
3. "The Cockfighter" – 2:59
4. "Little Fiddle" – 4:40
5. "Electrical Storm" – 5:06
6. "I'm with You" – 2:56
7. "There's Nothing Natural" – 2:56
8. "Messin' with the Kid" (Kuepper, Chris Bailey) – 4:50
9. "Ill Wind" – 5:51
10. "The Seeker" (Pete Townshend) – 3:48
11. "Everything I've Got Belongs to You" – 4:25
12. "La Di Doh" – 4:54
13. "Ring of Fire" (June Carter, Merle Kilgore) – 3:45
14. "Black Ticket Day" – 3:47
15. "So Close to Certainty" – 3:46
16. "Teenage Idol" (J. Lewis) – 1:42

== Personnel ==
- Ed Kuepper – vocals, acoustic guitar
