= Electrical Storm (album) =

Studio album by Ed Kuepper
- Released: June 1985
- Recorded: 1985
- Studio: Sound Barrier Studios, Sydney, New South Wales
- Genre: Alternative rock
- Length: 33:26
- Label: Hot Records
- Producer: Edmund Kuepper, Bruce Calloway

Ed Kuepper chronology
Electrical Storm (1985)	Rooms of the Magnificent (1986)

Electrical Storm is the debut solo album by Australian guitarist and songwriter Ed Kuepper featuring Nick Fisher and Louis Tillett recorded in 1985 and released on the Hot label. The album was Kuepper's first release following the breakup of Laughing Clowns, the band he formed after leaving The Saints.

== Recording ==
Kuepper explained, "I sort of retired. It was at that point Jude and I got married, and went away for a honeymoon on the fabulous Gold Coast. I took a guitar and wrote a lot of songs. And that was Electrical Storm basically. I did it for the princely sum of $1200."

Initial home demos were done with Bruce Calloway. Kuepper said, "I had the songs up to a point and then asked Louis and his drummer Nick Fisher came in and played the drums to the existing tracks which was brilliant. It's a hard thing to do to put the drums on last. So it was recorded fairly quickly. And it was mixed very quickly. I mean, the album was almost like a demo, which some people find a bit too confronting." Recording was done during cheaper studio downtime, between midnight and morning over a couple of weekends.

== Reissue ==
Electrical Storm was reissued on vinyl by Remote Control Records in 2023, after being out of print for 35 years.

The remastering was done by Don Bartley from the original tapes. Kuepper said, "the condition of the tapes was abysmal. He sent me photographs of them. I mean seriously, he said he'd never seen tapes in such bad condition. They were just covered in gunk and mould. You know, like thick, crusty mould. They looked disgusting, in fact, like something you wouldn’t want to touch."

== Track listing ==
All writing by Ed Kuepper.

1. "Car Headlights" – 2:44
2. "No More Sentimental Jokes" – 2:23
3. "Master of Two Servants" – 3:06
4. "A Trick or Two" – 3:07
5. "When the Sweet Turns Sour" – 2:51
6. "Another Story" – 2:56
7. "Electrical Storm" – 4:16
8. "Told Myself" – 4:00
9. "One Small Town" – 1:58
10. "Palace of Sin" – 3:29
11. "Rainy Night" – 1:55

== Personnel ==
- Ed Kuepper – vocals, electric guitar, acoustic guitar, bass guitar, mandolin
- Nick Fisher – drums
- Louis Tillett – piano

Technical

- Dave Boyne – engineer
- Jon Watkins – artwork
