= Honey Steel's Gold =

Studio album by Ed Kuepper
- Released: November 1991
- Recorded: 1991
- Genre: Alternative rock
- Length: 43:48; 74:43 (2000 re-release)
- Label: Hot
- Producer: Ed Kuepper

Ed Kuepper chronology
Today Wonder (1990)	Honey Steel's Gold (1991)	Black Ticket Day (1992)

Honey Steel's Gold is the fifth solo album by Australian guitarist and songwriter Ed Kuepper recorded in 1991 and released on the Hot label. The album was re-released in 2000 with six bonus tracks: four from Kuepper's No Wonder EP, and early recordings of "The Way I Made You Feel" and "Everything I've Got Belongs to You".

== Details ==
The songs recorded for the album had been written at different times over the previous decade. Kuepper said, "Something like "King Of Vice", was originally written for Laughing Clowns. I just never liked the way we played it particularly, so it never got recorded. And it was only by the time I got to Honey Steel's Gold that it sort of dawned on me that what I had as a saxophone intro would actually sound really beautiful and much better if it was played on a piano. There were little revelations like that."

== Critical reception ==
Professional ratings
Review scores
Source	Rating
AllMusic	4.5/5 stars
Rolling Stone Australia	3.5/5 stars

Reviewing the album in Rolling Stone Australia at the time of release, John Encarnacao said "Much of this album seems to be about the conjuring of mood rather than unfolding songs in a narrative manner." Encarnacao noted the contribution of Chris Abrahams, and predicted the song "Everything I've Got Belongs to You" would be a hit if released as a single.

The AllMusic review by Ned Raggett awarded the album 4½ stars and states "Honey Steel's Gold is Kuepper in many ways at his most dramatic and expansive". In October 2010, it was listed in the top 50 in the book, 100 Best Australian Albums.

A 33^{1}/_{3} book written by John Encarnação analysing the album is to be released on 2 November 2023.

== Commercial performance ==
The album spent 12 weeks in the Australian charts in 1992 peaking at number 28. Honey Steel's Gold was nominated for an ARIA for the Best Independent Release at the ARIA Music Awards of 1992.

== Track listing ==
All writing by Ed Kuepper, except where indicated.

1. "King of Vice" – 9:53
2. "Everything I've Got Belongs to You" – 4:15
3. "Friday's Blue Cheer/Libertines of Oxley" – 8:03
4. "Honey Steel's Gold" – 5:23
5. "The Way I Made You Feel" – 5:20
6. "Not Too Soon" – 3:12
7. "Closer" – 4:16
8. "Summerfield" – 3:41
9. "Indian Reservation" (John D. Loudermilk) – 3:10 Bonus track on CD reissue
10. "Steamtrain" (Ray Davies) – 7:40 Bonus track on CD reissue
11. "No Wonder Medley: No Wonder/Built for Comfort/Cypress Grove Blues" (Kuepper, Mark Dawson/Willie Dixon/Skip James) – 8:06 Bonus track on CD reissue
12. "Milk Cow Blues" (Sleepy John Estes) – 2:08 Bonus track on CD reissue
13. "The Way I Made You Feel 2" – 5:21 Bonus track on CD reissue
14. "Everything I've Got Belongs to You 2" – 4:16 Bonus track on CD reissue

- Recorded at Electric Avenue, Sydney, Australia in mid-1991.

== Personnel ==
- Ed Kuepper – vocals, guitar
- Mark Dawson – drums, percussion
- Sir Alfonso – bass guitar
- Chris Abrahams – piano

== Charts ==
Chart performance for Honey Steel's Gold
Chart (1992)	Peak position
Australian Albums (ARIA)	28
