= Serene Machine =

Studio album by Ed Kuepper
- Released: April 1993
- Recorded: February 1993
- Studio: Electric Avenue, Sydney
- Genre: Alternative rock
- Label: Hot
- Producer: Ed Kuepper; Phil Punch

Ed Kuepper chronology
Black Ticket Day (1992)	Serene Machine (1993)	Character Assassination (1994)

Serene Machine is the seventh solo album by Australian guitarist and songwriter Ed Kuepper recorded in 1993 and released on the Hot label. It received an ARIA Award for 'Best Independent Release' at the ARIA Music Awards of 1994.

== Reception ==
The album spent one week in the Australian Recording Industry Association Albums Chart in 1993 at No. 45. Serene Machine was awarded an ARIA for the Best Independent Release at the ARIA Music Awards of 1994.

== Track listing ==
All writing by Ed Kuepper, except where indicated.

1. "When She's Down" – 3:09
2. "Sleepy Head (Serene Machine)" – 4:00
3. "Who's Been Talking?" – 2:45
4. "It's Happened Before" – 3:48
5. "I Wish You Were Here" – 3:01
6. "Maria Peripatetica" (Traditional) – 3:36
7. "Sounds Like Mysterious Wind" – 3:19
8. "Reasons" – 3:54
9. "This Hideous Place" – 3:12
10. "(You) Don't Know What to Steal" – 3:47
11. "You Can't Please Everybody (Sweete Reprise)" – 4:00
12. "Married to My Lazy Life" – 2:24

== Personnel ==
- Ed Kuepper – vocals, guitar
- Mark Dawson – drums, percussion
- Sir Alfonso – bass guitar
- Artie Sledge – guitar, bass guitar
- The Hub Matinee Choral Society, The Socialist Republic of Newtown's People's Choir – vocals

== Charts ==
Chart performance for Serene Machine
Chart (1993)	Peak position
Australian Albums (ARIA)	45
