= Black Ticket Day =

Studio album by Ed Kuepper
- Released: August 1992
- Recorded: 1992
- Genre: Alternative rock
- Label: Hot
- Producer: Ed Kuepper; Phil Punch

Ed Kuepper chronology
Honey Steel's Gold (1991)	Black Ticket Day (1992)	Serene Machine (1993)

Black Ticket Day is the sixth solo album by Australian guitarist and songwriter Ed Kuepper, recorded in 1992 and released on the Hot label.

Lead single "Real Wild Life" was released in June 1992 and peaked at number 132.

== Reception ==
Professional ratings
Review scores
Source	Rating
AllMusic	2.5/5 stars

The album spent two weeks in the Australian charts in 1992, peaking at number 45. Black Ticket Day was awarded an ARIA for the Best Independent Release and was a nominee for Best Album at the 1993 ARIA Music Awards.

The AllMusic review by Roch Parisien awarded the album 2½ stars and states: "Even at his most gorgeously melodic, there's always a dark, mournful tinge to Kuepper's work. His ability to combine beauty with sadness and basic pop structures with extended improvisation can be mesmerizing."

== Track listing ==
All compositions by Ed Kuepper except as indicated

1. "It's Lunacy" – 3:56
2. "Blind Girl Stripper" – 9:02
3. "Real Wild Life" – 3:52
4. "All My Ideas Run to Crime" – 5:46
5. "Black Ticket Day" – 4:42
6. "Helps Me Understand" – 5:42
7. "There's Nothing Natural" – 3:49
8. "Walked Thin Wires" – 6:39

== Personnel ==
- Ed Kuepper – vocals, guitar
- Mark Dawson – drums, percussion
- Sir Alfonso – bass guitar, string arrangements
- Peter Bull – piano, organ
- Tim Hopkins – saxophone
- Cameron Lundy – string bass
- Paula Punch – vocals
- The Hub String Quartet (track 2)

== Charts ==
Chart performance for Black Ticket Day
Chart (1992)	Peak position
Australian Albums (ARIA)	45
