= Ed Kuepper =

Australian guitarist and singer (born 1955)

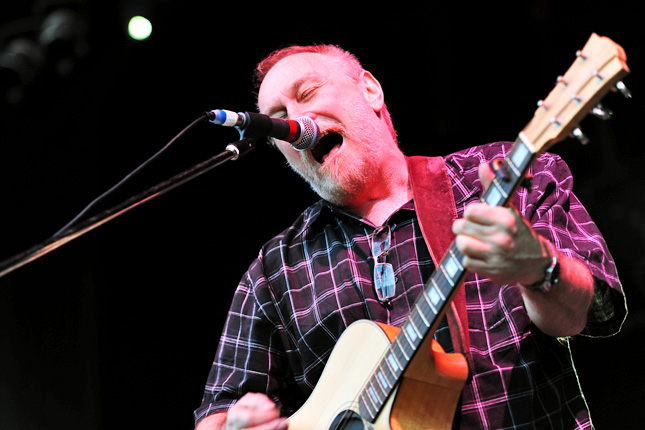
- Ed Kuepper playing at the Red Hill Auditorium (2011)

Background information
- Born: Edmund Kuepper; 20 December 1955 (age 70); Bremen, West Germany
- Origin: Brisbane, Queensland, Australia
- Genres: Rock; punk; alternative; avant-garde
- Occupations: Singer-songwriter, multi-instrumentalist, record producer
- Instruments: Guitar, vocals, bass guitar, banjo
- Years active: 1973–present
- Labels: Hot, True Tone, Capitol, Survival, Normal, Castle, Prince Melon
- Website: edkuepper.com

Edmund Kuepper (born 20 December 1955) is a German-born Australian guitarist, vocalist and songwriter. He co-founded the punk band The Saints in 1973, the experimental post-punk group Laughing Clowns (active 1979–85) and the grunge-like The Aints! (1991–94, 2017–present). He has also recorded over a dozen albums as a solo artist using a variety of backing bands. His highest charting solo album, Honey Steel's Gold, appeared in November 1991 and reached No. 28 on the ARIA Albums Chart. His other top 50 albums are Black Ticket Day (August 1992), Serene Machine (March 1993) and Character Assassination (August 1994). At the ARIA Music Awards of 1993 he won Best Independent Release for Black Ticket Day and won the same category in 1994 for Serene Machine.

== Biography ==
Edmund Kuepper was born on 20 December 1955 in Bremen, then part of West Germany. His family migrated to Australia in the 1960s and settled in Brisbane. He attended Oxley State High School and Corinda State High School with Chris Bailey and Ivor Hay.

=== 1973–1978 ===
Ed Kuepper's music career began in 1973 when he formed The Saints in Brisbane initially as a garage band, Kid Galahad and the Eternals. The line-up was Kuepper on lead guitar, Chris Bailey on lead vocals and Ivor Hay on piano. Early in the next year Hay switched to bass guitar and Jeffrey Wegener joined on drums, and they were renamed as The Saints.

Their early sound was a hybrid of Howlin' Wolf, The Pretty Things, and The Stooges; it "eventually coalesced into [their] own distinctive sound as defined by Kuepper's frenetic, whirlwind guitar style and Bailey's arrogant snarl" according to Australian musicologist, Ian McFarlane. By 1975 Hay switched to drums when Wegener left and Kym Bradshaw joined on bass guitar. The group had difficulty finding performance venues, and converted Bailey and Hay's share-house into a music venue, Club 76.

In 1976, the group wanted to record their material but found no interest from the Brisbane music industry. In September of that year they set up their own marketing company, Eternal Promotions and their own label, Fatal Records. They pressed 500 copies of their debut single, "(I'm) Stranded" co-written by Kuepper and Bailey. The track was lauded by Jonh Ingham of Sounds magazine as the "single of this and every week". In November the group were signed to EMI which quickly pressed their single and by December issued an album of the same name.

The group relocated to Sydney and then London, by May 1977, where they were promoted as punk rockers, however they eschewed "the spiky-topped, safety-pinned style of the leading UK punk groups". Kuepper noted "[The Saints] was a full thing by 1974. Two and a half years later, this incredibly fashionable movement comes along, only an arsehole would have associated himself with that".

Kuepper remained with The Saints until late in 1978 by which time they had issued Eternally Yours (May 1978) and Prehistoric Sounds (October). According to McFarlane, Bailey had wanted "three-chord rockers and pop songs" while Kuepper preferred "less commercial, more cerebral material". Kuepper left the group, returned to Australia, and The Saints continued with Bailey using a variable line-up.

=== 1979–1985: Laughing Clowns ===
Kuepper returned to Sydney late in 1978 and considered retiring from the music industry. However, in April 1979 he launched Laughing Clowns as a rock, soul and avant-jazz group. He provided lead guitar, lead vocals and banjo, with former bandmate Wegener on drums, Bob Farrell on saxophone, and Ben Wallace-Crabbe on bass guitar. Early in the next year, Ben's cousin Dan Wallace-Crabbe (ex-Crime & the City Solution guitarist) joined on piano. In May 1980, they issued their debut self-titled six-track EP on Missing Link Records, which was produced by Kuepper. AllMusic's John Bush described their sound as "jazzier and quite a bit more experimental than" The Saints.

Meanwhile, Kuepper and the group's manager, Ken West, started up their own label, Prince Melon Records, to release Laughing Clowns material. Laughing Clowns subsequently issued three studio albums, Mr Uddich Schmuddich Goes to Town (May 1982), Law of Nature (April 1984), and Ghosts of an Ideal Wife (June 1985) the last two on the Hot label. During July 1984 Kuepper rejoined The Saints on bass guitar as a touring musician alongside Bailey, Chris Burnham on lead guitar, and Iain Shedden on drums. However "old conflicts arose and he left" according to McFarlane. Laughing Clowns disbanded early in 1985 and Kuepper started his solo career.

=== 1985–1990: Early solo career ===
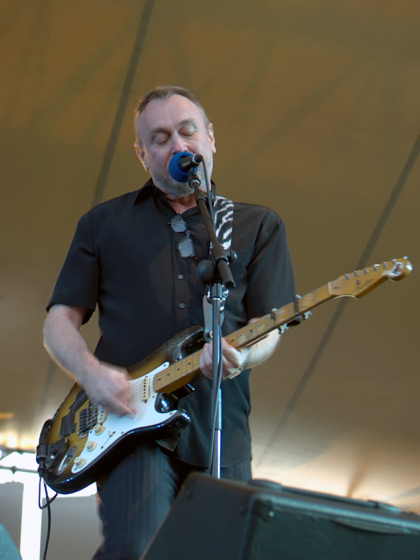
Kuepper, 2007

Early in 1985, Kuepper released Electrical Storm (June 1985), co-produced with Bruce Callaway (New Christs) and released by Hot Records. For the album he provided vocals, guitars: electric, acoustic and bass, and mandolin; he also used Callaway on guitar, Nick Fisher on drums, and Louis Tillett on piano. McFarlane describes the album as "stark and angular". While Bush felt it was "surprisingly pop-oriented".

In the following year he formed a backing band, The Yard Goes on Forever, with Michael Arthur on guitar; Louis Burdett (ex-Powerhouse) on drums, replaced a month later by Mark Dawson (ex-John Kennedy's Love Gone Wrong); and Paul Smith on bass guitar (ex-Laughing Clowns). As well as touring he used the group, with additional session musicians, to record his second studio album, Rooms of the Magnificent (September 1986). It was produced by Kuepper and appeared on Hot Records for the UK market and True Tone Records for the Australian market.

A third solo album, Everybody's Got To, appeared in February 1988 on Hot Records (UK), True Tone Records (Australia), and on Capitol Records for United States release. McFarlane noted his second and third albums had "consolidated the band's impressive live standing and contained many fine examples of guitar/horn-driven rock". While AllMusic's Dan LeRoy praised its "tight, polished alt-rock" sound as "perhaps his finest album ever". His fellow reviewer Bush related that it "failed to click with radio programmers or the public". The album's second single, "Nothing Changes in My House", had been released in November 1987 and reached the ARIA Singles Chart Top 100. A four-track EP, Happy as Hell, was issued in 1989 before Kuepper changed his musical direction.

=== 1990–1994: The Aints and more solo work ===
Kuepper and Dawson worked on an acoustic album, Today Wonder (October 1990), which McFarlane described as recorded "using unconventional guitar effects and an unusual drumkit", the pair proving "less is more with a mix of new tunes and covers". Australian journalist, Ed Nimmervoll, felt that the album had "changed the tide. Suddenly [Kuepper] was in favour again" whereas his previous material had "seemed to fall on deaf ears". Kuepper and Dawson also formed a side project, Mephisto Waltz, with Chris Abrahams on piano, which toured and performed "ambient instrumental" music with "unconventional sounds" but they did not record any material.

In April 1991, Kuepper formed a grunge-like band, The Aints, with Kuepper on guitar and vocals; and initially the line-up had Tim Reeves on drums; and Kent Steedman (also in The Celibate Rifles) on bass guitar. McFarlane noted that they quickly released "three fiery, distortion-drenched albums": S.L.S.Q (May 1991), Ascension (December) and Auto-cannibalism (June 1992). McFarlane further elaborated that with "blistering, guitar-heavy tracks ... these albums were the antithesis of Ed's solo work".

Kuepper continued his solo releases with another album, Honey Steel's Gold, appearing in November 1991, which peaked at No. 28 on the ARIA Albums Chart – his highest position on the Australian charts to date. According to McFarlane it was also the "highest mainstream placement for an independent album to that time". At the ARIA Music Awards of 1992 he was nominated for Best Independent Release for the album. Kuepper won Best Independent Australian Release in 1993, for Black Ticket Day (August 1992), and in 1994 for Serene Machine (March 1993). Black Ticket Day and Serence Machine had each reached No. 45.

=== 1994–current: Later career ===
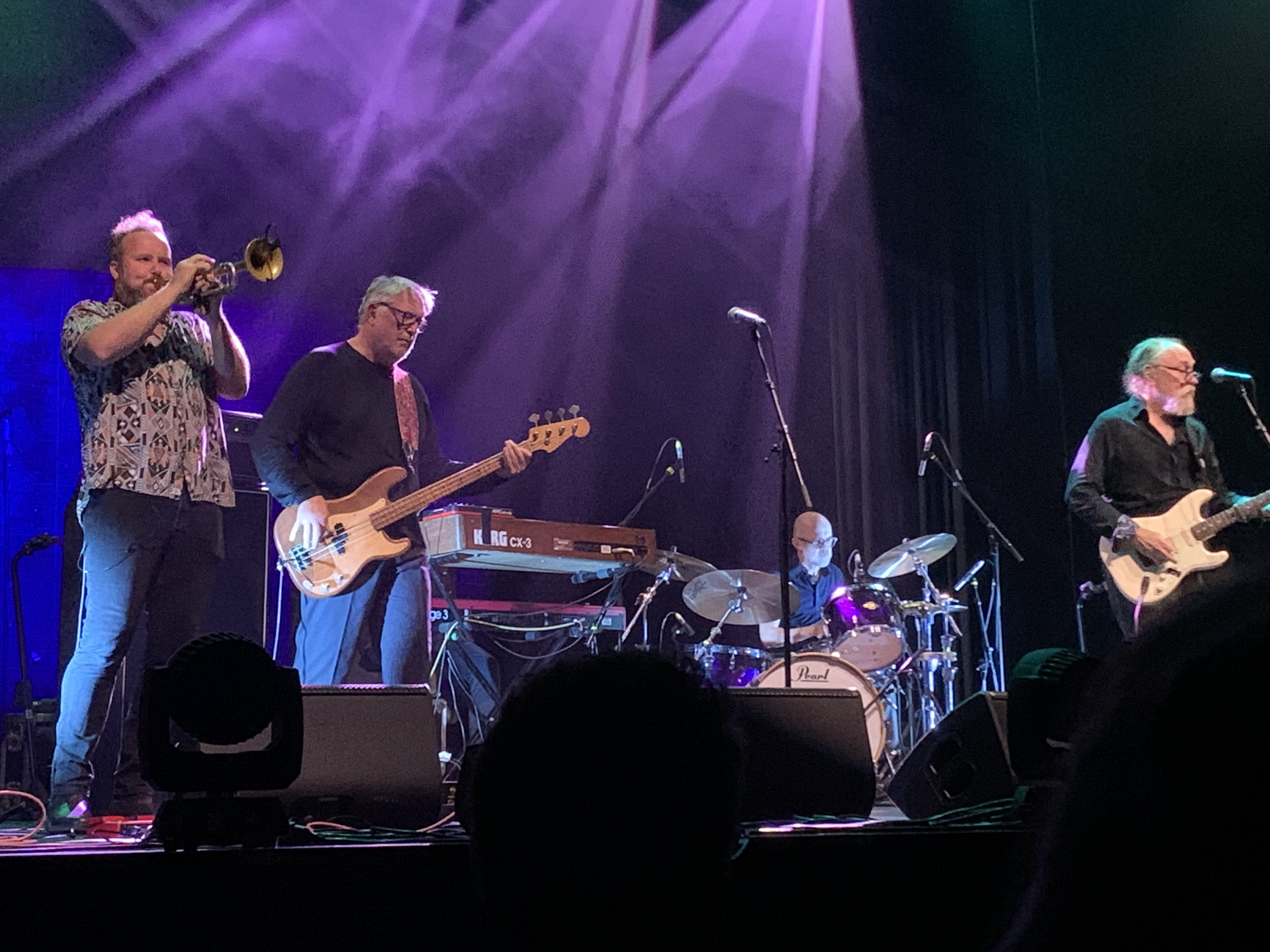
Kuepper and his band (left to right: Eamon Dilworth, trumpet; Peter Oxley, bass; Mark Dawson, drums; Kuepper, guitar and vocals) performing in 2024

Ed Kuepper's next album, Character Assassination (August 1994), peaked at No.32. It was nominated for an ARIA Award in 1995. Further nomination occurred in 1996 for The Exotic Mail Order Moods of Ed Kuepper (October 1995), 1997 for Frontierland (September 1996) and Starstruck: Music for Films & Adverts (March 1997), and 1998 for Live! with His Oxley Creek Playboys (June 1998).

During the early 1990s he was one of Australia's most prolific recording artists. He has recorded more than twenty solo albums using a variety of backing bands including His Oxley Creek Playboys, he Institute of Nude Wrestling, The Exploding Universe of Ed Kuepper, the New Imperialists, and the Kowalski Collective. Bush noted that "Despite his very appreciative cult of fans and torrid release schedule, Kuepper has not managed a breakthrough to wide popular acclaim".

Kuepper has also been involved in sound tracking radio drama and experimental films. During 2004, he toured Australia and Europe performing semi-improvised music to some of these films under the banner of Music for Len Lye (MFLL). Len Lye (1901–1980) was an artist known for experimental films and kinetic sculpture. Venues included the Institute of Modern Art (Brisbane), Sydney Opera House, the Austrian Film Museum (Vienna) and the Cartier Foundation (Paris), where Kuepper was the only rock musician to be invited apart from Velvet Underground.

2007 saw the release of Kuepper's Jean Lee and the Yellow Dog album, which was inspired by the story of Jean Lee who was the last woman hanged in Australia, and features amongst others, performances by Jeffrey Wegener (Laughing Clowns), Peter Oxley (Sunnyboys), Warren Ellis (Dirty Three), and Chris Bailey (The Saints).

After extensive touring in 2008 opening for Nick Cave and the Bad Seeds Kuepper joined Cave's band as a touring guitarist upon the departure of founding member Mick Harvey in early 2009. Kuepper also relaunched Prince Melon Records.

In March 2012, Kuepper released Second Winter, containing songs from the Electrical Storm and Rooms of the Magnificent albums with completely new arrangements and feel in the vein of Today Wonder.

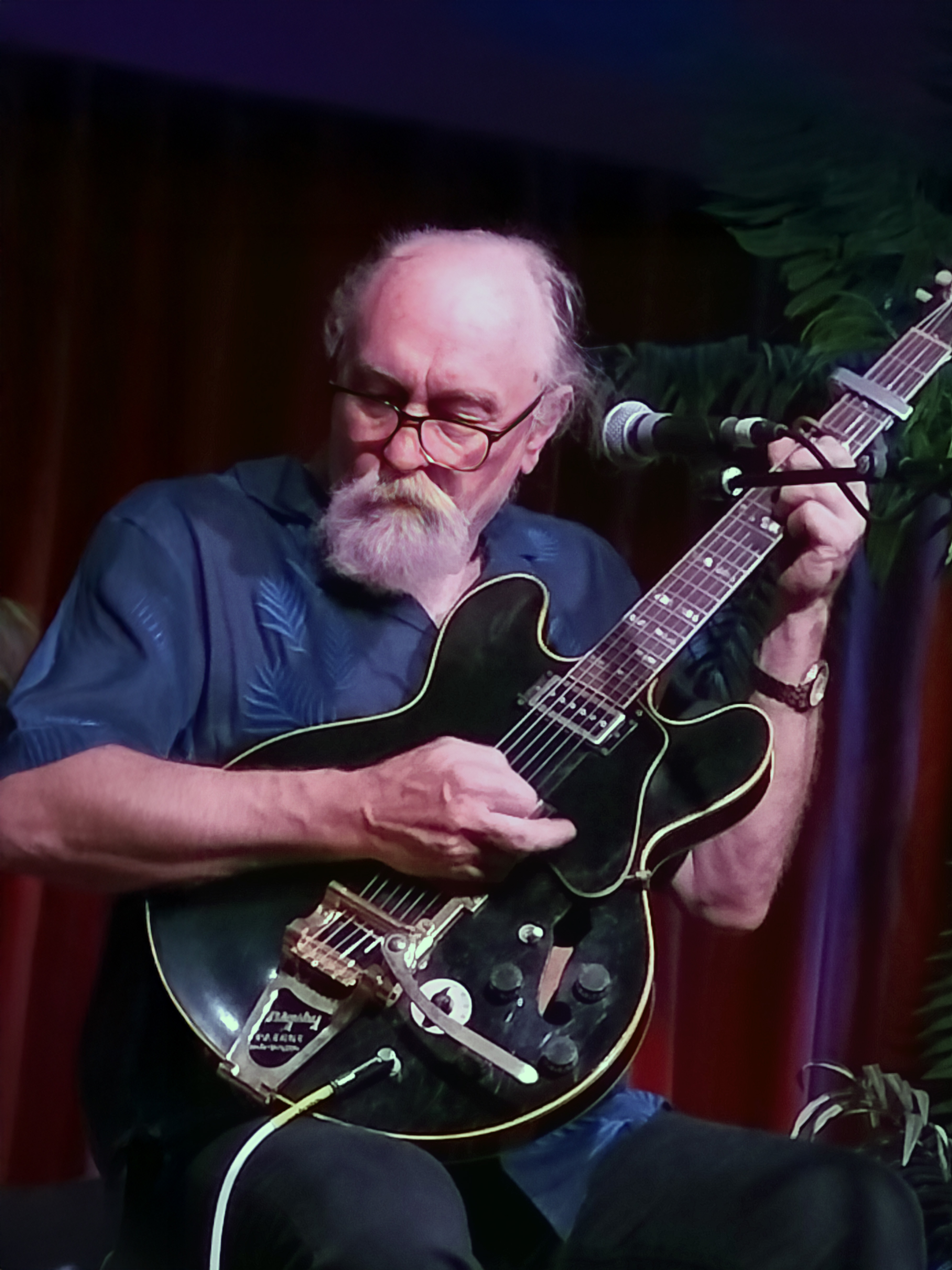
Kuepper at the Citadel in Murwillumbah

After spending most of 2013 on the road, performing a series of "Solo and By Request" shows, Kuepper released The Return of the Mail-Order Bridegroom, the second instalment in a mail-order series, containing reworked acoustic versions of songs by his former bands The Saints and Laughing Clowns, as well as new versions of his solo material and songs popularised by artists including Jimi Hendrix and The Walker Brothers.

In 2015, Kuepper provided the soundtrack for the film Last Cab to Darwin.

=== The Saints reunions ===
In addition to his brief 1984 stint as a touring bassist with the Saints, in September 2001 Kuepper and the original line-up of The Saints came together for a one-off reunion, when they were inducted into the Australian Recording Industry Association (ARIA) Hall of Fame.

On 14 July 2007, Kuepper, Chris Bailey and original drummer Ivor Hay re-united for another one-off gig at the Queensland Music Festival, with a more recent Saints member, Caspar Wijnberg, on bass guitar.

In January 2009, as part of the All Tomorrows Parties touring festival – curated by Mick Harvey, The Saints with Kuepper, Bailey, Hay, and Arturo LaRizza played shows in Brisbane, Sydney and in Mount Buller, Victoria. This was followed by a Melbourne show on 14 January as part of the Don't Look Back sideshow concerts, where they performed the (I'm) Stranded album in its entirety.

In May 2010, Kuepper & Bailey reunited for a monthlong tri-residency series of shows in Brisbane, Sydney & Melbourne. With Kuepper on electric guitar/vocals & Bailey on acoustic guitar/bass guitar/vocals they played a selection of songs from both solo careers and post-Kuepper Saints, as well as a few covers.

== Personal life ==
In late 1979, at a performance by Laughing Clowns in Sydney, Ed Kuepper met arts student and photographer Judi Dransfield—the couple later married. Since 1994, Dransfield-Kuepper has supplied art work, photography or illustrations for various Kuepper-related albums.

== Solo discography/studio albums ==
Ed Kuepper is credited with guitar (acoustic, electric, bass, slide), vocals, banjo, mandolin, keyboard, percussion, composer, producer, mixing, remastering:

- Electrical Storm (Hot, October 1985)
- Rooms of the Magnificent (True Tone/Hot, January 1987)
- Everybody's Got To (True Tone/Hot, June 1988)
- Today Wonder (Hot, October 1990)
- Honey Steel's Gold (Hot/Shock, November 1991)
- Black Ticket Day (Hot/Shock, August 1992)
- Serene Machine (Hot/Shock, April 1993)
- Character Assassination (Hot/Shock, July 1994)
- A King in the Kindness Room (Hot/Shock, October 1995)
- I Was a Mail Order Bridegroom (Hot, 1995)
- Exotic Mail Order Moods [Limited Edition] (Hot, 1995)
- Frontierland (Hot, October 1996)
- Starstruck: Music For Films & Adverts (Hot, December 1996)
- Cloudland [Limited Edition] (Hot, December 1997)
- The Blue House [Limited Edition] (Hot, 1998)
- Reflections of Ol' Golden Eye (Hot, 1999)
- Smile ... Pacific (Hot, June 2000)
- Jean Lee and the Yellow Dog (Hot, September 2007)
- Ascension Academy [Prince Melon Bootleg Series Vol.13] (Prince Melon, 2010)
- Second Winter (Prince Melon, March 2012)
- The Return of the Mail-Order Bridegroom (Prince Melon/Valve, 2014)
- Lost Cities (Prince Melon/Valve, 2015)
- After the Flood (with Jim White) (12XU, 2025)

== Awards and nominations ==
=== ARIA Music Awards ===
The ARIA Music Awards is an annual awards ceremony that recognises excellence, innovation, and achievement across all genres of Australian music.

Year	Nominee / work	Award	Result
1992	Honey Steel's Gold	Best Independent Release	Nominated
1993	Black Ticket Day	Album of the Year	Nominated
1993	Black Ticket Day	Best Independent Release	Won
1994	Serene Machine	Best Independent Release	Won
1995	Character Assassination	Best Independent Release	Nominated
1996	The Exotic Mail Order Moods of Ed Kuepper	Best Independent Release	Nominated
1997	Frontierland	Best Independent Release	Nominated

=== Queensland Music Awards ===
The Queensland Music Awards (previously known as Q Song Awards) are annual awards celebrating Queensland, Australia's brightest emerging artists and established legends. They commenced in 2006.

Year	Nominee / work	Award	Result (wins only)
2012	himself	Grant McLennan Lifetime Achievement Award	awarded
