= Jean Lee and the Yellow Dog =

Studio album by Ed Kuepper
- Released: September 2007
- Recorded: December 2006 – May 2007
- Studio: Everest Royal Sound Recorders
- Genre: Alternative rock
- Length: 51:27
- Label: Hot Records
- Producer: Ed Kuepper

Ed Kuepper chronology
This is the Magic Mile (2005)	Jean Lee and the Yellow Dog (2007)	Second Winter (2012)

Professional ratings
Review scores
Source	Rating
AllMusic	4/5 stars
Sunday Herald Sun	2.5/5 stars

Jean Lee and the Yellow Dog is an album by Australian guitarist and songwriter Ed Kuepper recorded in 2007 and released on the Hot label. Described as a loose concept album based around Jean Lee, the last female hanged in Australia, the album was released in a single CD and as a double CD limited edition with outtakes and demo recordings. It was Kuepper's first album in seven years.

The album was co-written by Kuepper's wife Judi Dransfield and featured Laughing Clowns drummer Jeffrey Wegener and bassist Peter Oxley, formerly of the Sunnyboys, as well as former Saints singer Chris Bailey. It included a cover version of the Go-Betweens' "Finding You", which Kuepper included as a tribute to its writer, Grant McLennan, who died in 2006. The song was recorded at Kuepper's home studio. "I went off to pick up my son from school and when I came back he'd done it," Dransfield said. "I had to convince him not to do anything to it."

== Background ==
Kuepper told The Age the Jean Lee album ended a years-long creative drought. "I went through a sort of personal situation where I guess I just couldn't write, and didn't want to write, and just felt ambivalent about even playing music." He came across a book about Jean Lee—a prostitute and petty criminal who was hanged in 1951 with two male accomplices for murdering a bookmaker, William "Pop" Kent, in Melbourne two years earlier—and said he was "blown away" by the fact that she had gone to the gallows. "When I read it I immediately thought of it as a musical-theatrical presentation." He said he and wife Judi Dransfield immediately began writing—"and it took on a life of its own."

"Jude has written poetry, and it was something that had occurred to me at various times, she should be writing lyrics," Kuepper said. "I think initially she had some difficulty with the story, I mean, none of the people are particularly likeable, but then once she got started on it, it just started flooding out, and it was great."

Dransfield said she did not connect with the story until she read about the arrest and what ensued. "When I read that she was willing to take the blame, knowing that the men had said they didn't do it, I was fairly impressed by that. She was a victim of circumstance and she was a single mum, which in the '50s was socially unacceptable."

== Track listing ==
All music by Ed Kuepper; all lyrics by Ed Kuepper and Judi Dransfield, except where indicated.

1. "Hang Jean Lee" – 4:18
2. "Miracles Are an Illusion" – 4:30
3. "That Depends (Pt 3)" – 6:41
4. "Daddy's Girl" – 3:37
5. "Skinny Jean" – 6:45
6. "The Yellow Dog" – 6:23
7. "Demolition" – 3:39
8. "Shame" – 4:36
9. "Real to Me I" – 3:05
10. "Real to Me II" – 3:29
11. "Finding You" (Robert Forster, Grant McLennan) – 3:28
12. "Ambient Piece" – 0:56

Bonus CD 2: Pretty Rough Trade

1. "Conscience" (outtake)
2. "The Big 900" (outtake)
3. "Colonel Kramer" (outtake)
4. "He Asked for Water and Jean Gives Him Gasoline" (outtake)
5. "Miracles" (demo)
6. "Shame" (demo)
7. "That Depends, Pt I" (demo)
8. "Jean Behind the Wall of Sleep (Ed, Jeff and Sir Alfonso Horsin' Around in the Studio)"
9. "Another Version of an Australian Badland" (outtake)

== Personnel ==
- Ed Kuepper – vocals, electric guitar, acoustic guitar
- Jeffrey Wegener – drums
- Peter Oxley – bass guitar
- Sir Alfonso – keyboards, percussion, drums
- Jane Elliott – cello ("Hang Jean Lee", "Real to Me (1)", "Finding You")
- Chris Bailey – vocals ("That Depends Part 3")
- Warren Ellis – violin ("Miracles")
- Su Crowley – backing vocals ("That Depends Part 3", "Shame")
- John Willsteed – banjo, lap steel guitar ("Real to Me (1)")
