= A King in the Kindness Room =

Studio album by Ed Kuepper
- Released: July 1995
- Recorded: 1995
- Genre: Alternative rock
- Label: Hot
- Producer: Ed Kuepper & Phil Punch

Ed Kuepper chronology
Character Assassination (1994)	A King in the Kindness Room (1995)	I Was a Mail Order Bridegroom (1995)

A King in the Kindness Room is the ninth solo album by Australian guitarist and songwriter Ed Kuepper recorded in 1995 and released on the Hot label. The album peaked at number 99 on the ARIA Charts.

== Reception ==
The Allmusic review by Ned Raggett awarded the album 3 stars and states "Kuepper's all-around abilities — he plays all the guitars and most of the bass — readily come to the fore, with his own particular combination of psychedelic murk and straightforward playing in evidence throughout. It resists all trends, and all for the better at that".

Professional ratings
Review scores
Source	Rating
Allmusic	3/5 stars

== Track listing ==
All compositions by Ed Kuepper except as indicated

1. "Confession of a Window Cleaner" – 5:49
2. "Pissed Off" – 3:09
3. "Highway to Hell" (Bon Scott, Angus Young, Malcolm Young) – 5:08
4. "Messin' Pt. II" – 7:10
5. "They Call Me Mr. Sexy (Love Theme from CCR vs the 3rd Reich)" – 9:01
6. "Sundown" (Gordon Lightfoot) – 4:40
7. "Space Pirate" – 4:27
8. "The Diving Board" – 3:25
  - Recorded at Electric Avenue, Sydney, Australia in early 1995.

== Personnel ==
- Ed Kuepper – vocals, acoustic guitar, electric guitar, elastic guitar, bass guitar
- Mark Dawson – drums, percussion
- Louise Elliott – flute, saxophone
- Linda Neil – violin
- Philip Punch – additional drums
- John Napier – cello
- Victor Round, Mark Costa – additional bass

== Charts ==
Chart (1995)	Peak position
Australian Albums (ARIA)	99
