= Character Assassination (album) =

Studio album by Ed Kuepper
- Released: August 1994
- Recorded: 1994
- Studio: Electric Avenue, Sydney, Australia
- Genre: Alternative rock
- Label: Hot
- Producer: Ed Kuepper; Phil Punch

Ed Kuepper chronology
Serene Machine (1993)	Character Assassination (1994)	A King in the Kindness Room (1995)

Character Assassination is the eighth solo album by Australian guitarist and songwriter Ed Kuepper recorded in 1994 and released on the Hot label. Early pressings of the album were released with an additional disc Death to the Howdy-Doody Brigade containing the undubbed master versions of all songs but one from Character Assassination and one new song.

== Reception ==
Professional ratings
Review scores
Source	Rating
AllMusic	4/5 stars

The album spent three weeks in the Australian charts in 1994 peaking at number 32. Character Assassination was nominated for an ARIA for the Best Independent Release at the ARIA Music Awards of 1995 and Kuepper was nominated for Best Male Artist.

The AllMusic review by Ned Raggett awarded the album 4 stars and states "Kuepper once again demonstrates his talent for instantly appealing, addictive music on Character Assassination. The whole album is for the most part a stripped-down experience, not an unplugged or wholly acoustic effort by any means and often taking a faster pace, but eschewing Kuepper's fiercer guitar work and fuller arrangements for a calmer, less explosive turn".

== Track listing ==
All compositions by Ed Kuepper except as indicated

1. "By the Way" – 4:03
2. "Little Fiddle (and the Ghost of Xmas Past)" – 4:23
3. "Cockfighter" – 3:43
4. "My Best Interests at Heart" – 4:27
5. "Take It by the Hand" – 3:46
6. "La Di Doh" – 5:07
7. "I'm with You" – 3:07
8. "Ill Wind" – 6:37
9. "So Close to Certainty" – 4:44
10. "A Good Soundtrack (Pushin' Fear)" – 3:36
11. "Ring of Fire" (June Carter Cash, Merle Kilgore) – 4:04
12. "If I Had a Ticket" – 2:40

Bonus disc: Death to the Howdy-Doody Brigade

1. "By the Way" – 4:03
2. "Little Fiddle (and the Ghost of Xmas Past)" – 4:23
3. "Cockfighter" – 3:43
4. "My Best Interests at Heart" – 4:27
5. "Take It by the Hand" – 3:46
6. "La Di Doh" – 5:07
7. "I'm with You" – 3:07
8. "Ill Wind" – 6:37
9. "So Close to Certainty" – 4:44
10. "A Good Soundtrack (Pushin' Fear)" – 3:36
11. "Ring of Fire" (Cash, Kilgore) – 4:04
12. "Number 10" – 2:40

== Personnel ==
- Ed Kuepper – vocals, acoustic guitar, electric guitar, elastic stringed guitar, bass guitar, bottle
- Mark Dawson – drums, percussion
- Barry Turnbull – bass
- Linda Neil – violin
- Naomi Star, Toni Mott – backing vocals
- Miroslav Bukovsky, Julian Gough, Herb Cannon – horn section
- Charlie McMahon – didgeridoo
- Jim Conway – harmonica, jaw harp
- Peter Burgess – washboard

== Charts ==
Chart performance for Character Assassination
Chart (1994)	Peak position
Australian Albums (ARIA)	32
