= Today Wonder =

Studio album by Ed Kuepper
- Released: 1990
- Recorded: February 1988
- Studios: Electric Avenue, Sydney, Australia
- Genre: Alternative rock
- Length: 78:31 (2002 reissue)
- Label: Hot
- Producer: Ed Kuepper

Ed Kuepper chronology
Everybody's Got To (1988)	Today Wonder (1990)	Honey Steel's Gold (1991)

Today Wonder is the fourth solo album by Australian guitarist and songwriter Ed Kuepper. It was recorded in 1990 by Kuepper and drummer Mark Dawson and released on the Hot label. The album was re-released in 2002 with eight bonus tracks recorded for a Dutch radio station.

== Details ==
Five years after the recording, Kuepper said, "I wanted to do something that had a much looser approach. Today Wonder was about as open as you can get. They were all demos. The album I did in a weekend with Dawson." Kuepper approached many record labels with none showing any interest. "We hawked them around everywhere. Given that a couple of the songs on that album have broken me, it's pretty ironic. Record companies just couldn't hear anything."

== Reception ==
Professional ratings
Review scores
Source	Rating
AllMusic	4/5 stars

The AllMusic review by Ned Raggett awarded the album 4 stars and states "Today Wonder in many ways was the release that helped determine part (if not all) of Ed Kuepper's future work. Specifically, it's the way around close, quiet, but still tense and strong performances... The end result's a beauty of a record".

Clinton Walker described the album as "remarkable for the nature of the songs themselves, as Kuepper plumbed a personal honesty that most singer/songwriters wouldn't dare confront. Today Wonder, in finding new dimensions and textures again, was nothing short or revelatory." Juke agreed it was "a very personal affair which sees Ed reasserting himself as a songwriter of distinction. It echoes with all the resonances of a man who has just faced a personal crisis and triumphed."

== Track listing ==
All writing by Ed Kuepper, except where indicated.

1. "Horse Under Water" – 6:04
2. "Always the Woman Pays" – 3:13
3. "Everything I've Got Belongs to You" – 4:33
4. "What You Don't Know" – 4:01
5. "I'd Rather Be the Devil" (Skip James) – 4:24
6. "There's Nothing Natural" – 3:45
7. "Today Wonder Medley: Today Wonder/Hey Gyp/White Houses" (Kuepper, Donovan Leitch, Eric Burdon) – 4:32
8. "Pretty Mary" – 3:41
9. "Eternally Yours" – 5:33
10. "If I Were a Carpenter" (Tim Hardin) – 3:57

Bonus track on CD reissue

11. "Intermission" – 0:18
12. "Always the Woman Pays" (live) – 4:02
13. "What You Don't Know" (live) – 4:32
14. "Pretty Mary" (live) – 4:18
15. "Today Wonder Medley" (live) (Kuepper, Leitch, Burdon) – 4:14
16. "Horse Under Water" (live) – 5:30
17. "I Am Your Prince/Told Myself" (live) – 7:15
18. "Everything I've Got Belongs to You" (live) – 4:32

Tracks 11–18 recorded in the Netherlands.

== Personnel ==
- Ed Kuepper – vocals, 12 string guitar, elastic guitar
- Mark Dawson – drums, cardboard box

== Charts ==
Chart (1990)	Peak position
Australian Albums (ARIA)	139
