= The Aints =

The Aints!
- Origin: Sydney, New South Wales, Australia; Brisbane, Queensland, Australia
- Genres: Garage rock; punk rock
- Years active: 1991–1995, 2017–present
- Labels: ABC Music; Hot Records
- Members: Ed Kuepper; Peter Oxley; Paul Larsen Loughhead; Alister Spence; Eamon Dilworth
- Website: theaints.com

The Aints is a band name used by Ed Kuepper during his prolific early 1990s period. The group's name relates to Kuepper's first recording group, the Saints, and its initial incarnation concentrated on previously released Saints material from the mid-to-late 1970s, when Kuepper was a member. The Aints then changed direction to produce loud, feedback-drenched recordings of new Kuepper originals.

In 2017, Kuepper convened a new iteration, this time adding an exclamation mark (thus officially known as the Aints!) to record and tour material he had written between the years 1969-1978, much of which had been in the setlist of the original Saints but which had, with few exceptions, not been recorded or released.

== History ==
=== 1991–1995 ===
The name is a variation on the Saints, the band Kuepper had formed with Chris Bailey in Brisbane in the early 1970s. It apparently derived from an old Saints bass drum head on which the initial letter "S" had worn off.

Kuepper has stated his aim with The Aints was to recapture the energy of the late 1970s incarnation of the Saints. Although the band's set started with Saints material, the sound of the band was more a driving three-piece with Neil Young-style feedback. The later original material featured saxophone and a more free-form approach.

The band started playing around Sydney on 13 April 1991 with Kuepper (guitar, vocals), Kent Steedman (bass) and Tim Reeves (drums). They quickly released a recording of this first show, S.L.S.Q – Very Live!, recorded on cassette, sold at shows as well as in shops. (The name stands for "Strictly Limited Sound Quality" or "Slightly Limited Sound Quality".) This recording and the Australian tour shows of 1991 consisted of old Saints material.

In this period, Kuepper was releasing new albums at a rate of roughly three a year. The Aints were quickly added to this release cycle. With Artie Sledge (bass), Mark Dawson (drums) and Tim Hopkins (sax), the Aints released two albums of original songs: Ascension in November 1991 and Autocannibalism in 1992, both on Hot Records. Ian McFarlane said, "with blistering, guitar-heavy tracks, these albums were the antithesis of Kuepper's solo work."

Hot issued a five-track CD EP compilation, Cheap Erotica, in November 1993, and a compilation, Shelflife Unlimited!!! – Hotter Than Blazing Pistols!!!, in August 1995. A third Aints album called Afterlife was recorded, but is yet to be issued.

=== 2017–present: The Aints! ===
In 2017, Kuepper enlisted bassist Peter Oxley (Sunnyboys), drummer Paul Larsen Loughhead (The Celibate Rifles/The New Christs), jazz pianist Alister Spence, and trumpeter and brass arranger Eamon Dilworth to form The Aints! The band performed shows throughout Australia in 2017–2018, primarily focusing on material from The Saints' catalogue (1973–1978). The debut studio album from the group was The Church of Simultaneous Existence, and features songs written by Kuepper in and around his tenure in The Saints. The album was released on 21 September 2018, through ABC Music. It debuted at number 82 on the ARIA Albums Chart.

In 2019 the group released a live LP, Play The Saints (73' – 78') (Live Official Bootleg) and a 5-track EP, 5-6-7-8-9. Following the death of Chris Bailey and the reissue of the first Saints album (I'm) Stranded Kuepper toured with a band also featuring Peter Oxley, under the name The Saints ('73-'78), arguably taking its cue from some of the Aints/Aints! raison d'être.

== Discography ==
=== Albums ===
Title	Album details
S.L.S.Q	Released: 1991; Label: Hot Records (AINT ONE); Note: Recorded live at The Harold Park Hotel, Sydney, 13 April 1991
Ascension	Released: 1991; Label: Hot Records (HOT 1035)
Autocannibalism	Released: 1992; Label: Hot Records (HOT 1037)
Cheap Erotica	Released: 1992; Label: Hot Records (HIT 4); Compilation
Shelf Life Unlimited - Hotter Than Blazing Pistols	Released: 1995; Label: Hot Records (HOT 1054); Compilation
The Church of Simultaneous Existence	Released: September 2018; Label: ABC Music (6787296)
The Aints Play The Saints	Released: 2019; Label: Fatal Records (FATAL 002); Note: Recorded live in Sydney and Brisbane 2017-2018.
Live At Marrickville Bowlo	Released: May 2021; Label: Fatal Records (FATAL 003); Note: Recorded live at Marrickville Bowling Club, Sydney, 27 April 2018.

== Awards and nominations ==
=== ARIA Music Awards ===
The ARIA Music Awards are a set of annual ceremonies presented by Australian Recording Industry Association (ARIA), which recognise excellence, innovation, and achievement across all genres of the music of Australia. They commenced in 1987.

Year	Nominee / work	Award	Result	Ref.
1992	Ascension	Best Independent Release	Nominated	
