= Laughing Clowns =

Australian post-punk band

- Origin: Sydney, New South Wales, Australia
- Genres: Post-punk; alternative rock; punk jazz; free jazz
- Years active: 1979–1984; 2009–2010
- Labels: Missing Link; Prince Melon; Hot; Rough Trade; Red Flame; Seven
- Members: Ed Kuepper; Jeffrey Wegener; Louise Elliott; Leslie 'Bif' Millar; Alister Spence
- Past members: Bob Farrell; Ben Wallace-Crabbe; Dan Wallace-Crabbe; Peter Milton Walsh; Dianne Spence; Glad Reed; Paul Smith; Peter Doyle
- Website: facebook.com/laughingclowns

Laughing Clowns, sometimes written as The Laughing Clowns, were a post-punk band formed in Sydney in 1979. In five years, the band released three LPs, three EPs, and various singles and compilations. Laughing Clowns' sound is free jazz, bluegrass and krautrock influenced. The band formed to accommodate Ed Kuepper's growing interest in expanding brass-driven elements he had brought to The Saints' third album, Prehistoric Sounds, and by adopting flattened fifth notes in a rock and roll setting while using a modern jazz styled band line-up.

Along with The Birthday Party, The Go-Betweens, The Moodists and The Triffids, the Laughing Clowns also spent extended periods in Europe during the early 1980s, and gained an international cult status. All four aforementioned groups have cited Laughing Clowns as an influence at some point in their respective careers.

== History ==
=== Early years: 1979–1981 ===
Laughing Clowns was formed in April 1979 in Sydney as a rock, soul, avant-jazz group by Bob Farrell on saxophone, Ed Kuepper on lead guitar and lead vocals (ex-Kid Galahad and the Eternals, The Saints), Ben Wallace-Crabbe on bass guitar, and Jeffrey Wegener on drums (ex-The Saints, Last Words, Young Charlatans). In late 1978 Kuepper had quit punk rock band, The Saints, in London – where they had relocated from Brisbane – due to a rift with fellow founder, Chris Bailey regarding future direction . Kuepper preferred "less commercial, more cerebral material" as seen on the band's third album, Prehistoric Sounds (October 1978).

When Kuepper returned to Australia in 1978 he had contemplated retirement from music, however he reconnected with two old school friends, Farrell and Wegener, at a party and they coaxed him into forming a new band. Both Farrell and Wegener had associations with The Saints: Wegener was an early member in 1975 and Farrell had been one of the Flat Top Four, which performed backing vocals on "Kissin' Cousins" for that band's debut album, (I'm) Stranded (February 1977). Ben Wallace-Crabbe had played in a Melbourne band, The Love, with Wegener, and completed the initial line-up. A proposed single by The Saints, "Laughing Clowns" / "On the Waterfront", through EG Records was not recorded by that group due to the difference of opinion between Kuepper and Bailey. Each song appeared elsewhere: "On the Waterfront" on The Saints' first post-Kuepper EP, Paralytic Tonight, Dublin Tomorrow (March 1980) and "Laughing Clowns" provided Kuepper's new band's name and was included on their self-titled six-track mini-album in May that year.

Laughing Clowns made their public debut in August 1979, immediately encountering both confusion and antipathy from some of The Saints' fans who expected a more abrasive punk sound. Australian musicologist, Ian McFarlane, noted that "Part of the problem was that the band's sound defied categorisation. Having to overcome such ludicrous labels as 'jazz-punk' ... [it] was diverse yet moody, at turns melodic or dissonant. It ranged from rock and soul to avant-jazz". The Saints' Prehistoric Sounds had only recently received a local release via EMI, so Laughing Clowns performed various tracks from that album in their early sets – including "The Prisoner", "Swing for the Crime", "Everything's Fine" and "Church of Indifference". Later in the year, Ben's cousin and former guitarist in the Melbourne-based version of Crime & the City Solution as well as The Love, Dan Wallace-Crabbe, joined the group on piano.

Laughing Clowns EP – first pressing with red text, which was released by Missing Link in May 1980. The EP's cover art is by Robin Wallace-Crabbe.

This five-piece incarnation recorded Laughing Clowns at Richmond Recorders in Melbourne with production by Kuepper, and engineering by Tony Cohen. All six tracks were written by Kuepper. Released via Missing Link, it gained favourable reviews in the Australian independent music press. McFarlane opined that the EP was "unlike any other [record] made in Australia to that point. The music's only parallel lay in latter-day Saints as a logical progression from Prehistoric Sounds, but at the same time it was a departure, a foray into new territory. The open-ended song arrangements were stirring and provocative, but also disconcerting. The production values were cavernous and echoey; a fascinating sound, but very cold and detached".

A promotional video for one of its tracks, "Holy Joe", was filmed. Upon the EP's release, they expanded to a six-piece group with Peter Doyle on trumpet. This configuration performed at the Paris Theatre in Sydney in November 1980, with The Birthday Party and The Go-Betweens; this was to be the last gig with Farrell. Ben also left the group before the year's end and his cousin, Dan followed within a few months. Ben subsequently formed Upside Down House; he died in 1987.

The group's second release, a three-track EP, Sometimes, the Fire Dance...., appeared on the Prince Melon imprint – a label run by manager, Ken West, and Kuepper - in February 1981. The label name 'Prince Melon' was the nickname the band had for West. This EP had been recorded in mid-June 1980 with the six-piece line-up, again with Cohen engineering, but the whole group produced it. Jonathan Green of The Canberra Times felt the EP had "[s]uper songs, especially the A side, which strikes the odd emotional chord (sob), from one of the most challenging bands in the country. Apparently poppy, with an underlying and sinister atonality".

In March 1981 the band released a third EP, Laughing Clowns 3, with five tracks. In July the two Prince Melon EPs were combined to create their first compilation album, Throne of Blood/Reign of Terror. The line-up of Doyle, Kuepper and Wegener continued as a three-piece exploring much freer arrangements, and drawing from the band's mutual interest in free jazz. By mid-1981 they gained Louise Elliott on saxophone and flute and Leslie 'Bif' Millar on fretless and upright bass guitar. With this new line-up, the band delved further into jazz-inspired improvisation and experimentation.

=== Mr Uddich-Schmuddich Goes to Town 1982 ===
In March 1982 Laughing Clowns issued its debut album, Mr Uddich-Schmuddich Goes to Town. It had been recorded in November of the previous year and was produced by Doyle, Kuepper and Wegener; engineered by Doyle and Peter Walker (ex-Bakery guitarist). It showed a change of approach with the addition of Millar's jazz-schooled bass playing. Much like the work of Captain Beefheart, the seemingly improvisational elements are predetermined by Kuepper, the band's primary songwriter, except the LP's title track.

Jim Green, of TrouserPress, summarised the group's history and described this album as displaying "a shift in the lineup brought in a new saxman and bassist (playing acoustic stand-up) and dropped the pianist. The tracks are more succinct, and the overall impression is that of consolidation and retrenchment". Alex Griffin of Life is Noise website lists it as one of his Top Australian Albums, "Despite sounding like it was recorded inside Ed’s cavernous, musty trachea, the songs are paranoid and shifting, propelled as ever by Jeffrey Wagoner’s drumming which sounds like a jittery dinosaur in a Chinese tea room". Soon after its release the band, except Doyle, relocated briefly to Europe and recorded a session for John Peel which appeared on a four-track EP, Everything That Flies Is not a Bird, released in 1983. By the end of 1982, the group had temporarily split due to internal tensions, and Wegener joined The Birthday Party for a tour of the Netherlands early the following year.

=== Law of Nature: 1983–1984 ===
Kuepper reformed Laughing Clowns in May 1983 with Elliott and Wegener but without Millar. They added Peter Milton Walsh (ex-The Apartments) on bass guitar. Walsh had not played bass guitar in a band before; he appeared on the group's second album, Law of Nature. It was recorded during the latter half of 1983 in Sydney and released in April 1984 on the newly formed label, Hot, and included contributions from pianist Chris Abrahams. A single, "Eternally Yours", was released on 12" in March and a promotional video was made to promote it. The group started a national tour, The Canberra Times' correspondent noted gig giveaways included "Free flexi-discs of the band's new single, 'Eternally Yours', which will include one unreleased track, ... to the first 300 people passing through the door. Albums and 12inch giveaways are on the agenda". The line-up were "well-established" with Kuepper, Wegener, Elliot, and Walsh.

The album employs the recording of dual acoustic and electric guitar tracks, and a more song-based approach. The Canberra Times reviewer, Debbie Muir, noted its "innovative, though frankly bitter, style that's not punk or new wave or straight rock but just its unpretentious self". She praised the lead single as "The best track by far... [it] conveys an atmosphere of drooling sadness ... the extended single version is much, much better" than the album's version. McFarlane praised the album and its lead single as being "amongst the band's very finest works. There were moments of great beauty on Law of Nature such as 'Law of Nature', 'Written in Exile' and 'Eternally Yours', where Elliot's soulful and epic sax riff danced majestically in the air". After a national and European tour in support of the album, Walsh departed to reform The Apartments and Paul Smith replaced him as bassist.

=== Ghosts of an Ideal Wife and break-up: 1984–1985 ===
Laughing Clowns were expanded with the addition of Glad Reed on trumpet, Dianne Spence on saxophone, and Louis Tillett on piano. In October 1984 they began recording Ghosts of an Ideal Wife, at Alberts Studios. By Christmas of that year, the band split after international and national tours, with Kuepper finishing the album, early in 1985. A posthumous single, the double A side "Just Because I Like" / "Crystal Clear" was released in February 1985 via Hot Records. Shortly after disbanding Elliott and Wegener briefly joined The Saints for an Australian tour. Kuepper began work on his debut solo LP, Electrical Storm (June 1985).

Much of the Laughing Clowns' saga was recounted in the book, Stranded: The Secret History of Australian Independent Music 1977–1991 (1996), by Australian rock music writer, Clinton Walker. Walker had been a confidante of the band and one of its outspoken critical champions. In September 2005 Tim Ritchie of Radio National reviewed their 3× CD compilation album, Cruel but Fair (The Complete Clowns Recordings), and described their style as "so singular, so 'not part of the trends' that they would either have people walking out of gigs in droves, or have them swear they were witness to something akin to greatness". The anthology was released on 3 October 2005 to further critical acclaim, Donat Tahiraj of Time Off magazine declared they were "the most inventive and innovative Australian band of the post-punk era".

=== Afterwards and reformation ===
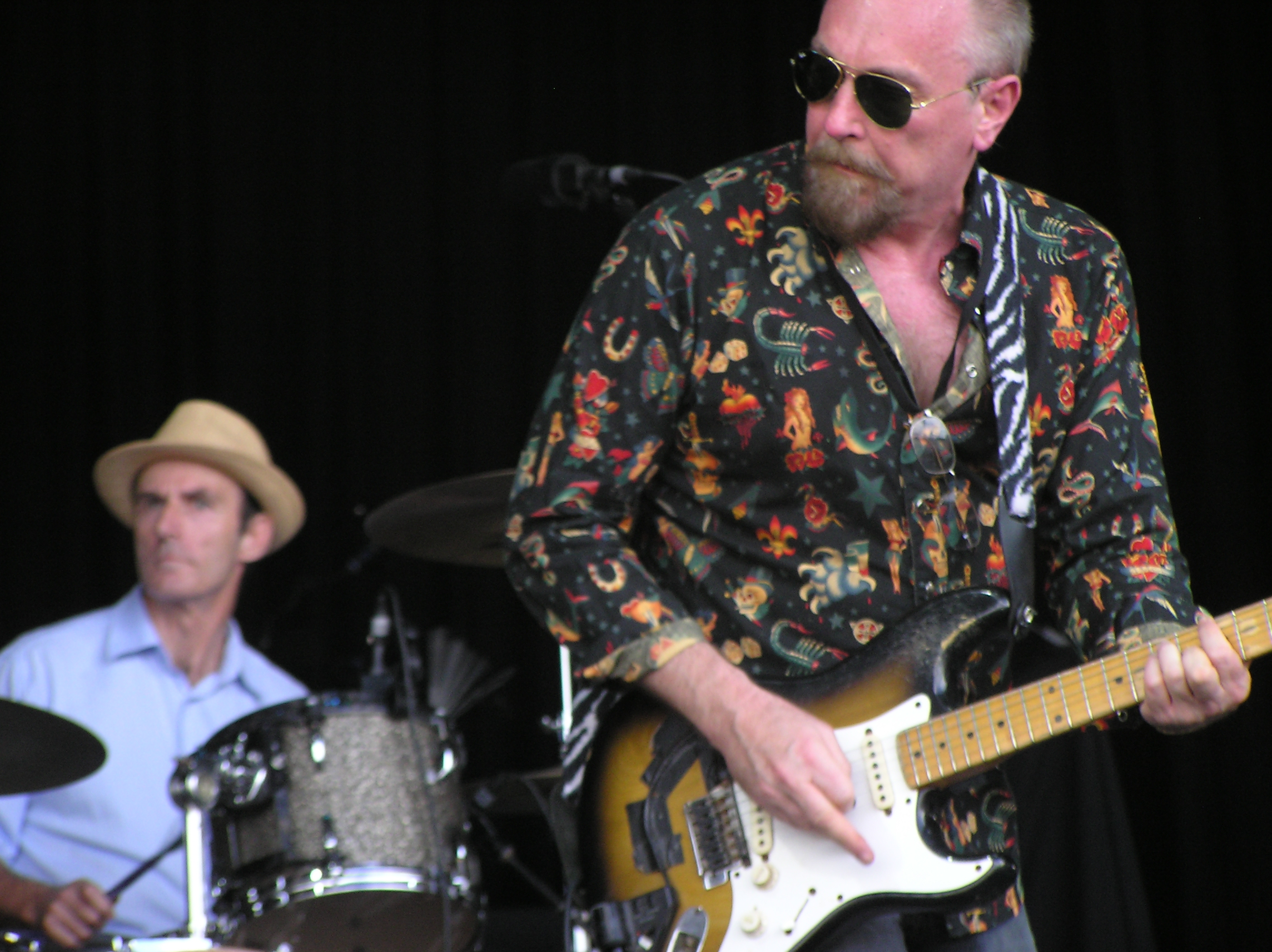
Ed Kuepper and Jeffrey Wegener of Laughing Clowns at All Tomorrow's Parties, Sydney 17 January 2009.

In 2004 Kuepper and Wegener performed together on Ed Kuepper's MFLL project, a live presentation of soundtracks to short films which toured Australia and Europe, including a show at the Cartier Foundation. Subsequently, Wegener joined Kuepper's touring band, The Kowalski Collective, and appeared on his concept album, Jean Lee and the Yellow Dog (September 2007). A version of The Laughing Clowns was re-formed, only for purposes of playing live. In 2008 Kuepper restarted the Prince Melon record label, and in March of the following year released a live album, Prince Melon Bootleg Series Volume 7: Laughing Clowns Live. The concert was at The Gallery of Modern Art in Brisbane with a line-up of Elliott, Kuepper, Millar, Wegener and Alister Spence on keyboards.

This line-up also played the All Tomorrow's Parties festival in May 2009, curated by Nick Cave and the Bad Seeds and an eastern states tour. The band toured Australia in January 2010, again, as a part of All Tomorrow's Parties' Don't Look Back series of shows supporting Dirty Three. For the tour Laughing Clowns performed their 1984 compilation, History of Rock 'n' Roll Volume One, in its entirety. Prince Melon issued two further live albums in 2010.

== Members ==
- Bob Farrell – saxophone (1979–81)
- Ed Kuepper – lead vocals, lead guitar, banjo (1979–82, 1983–84, 2009–2010)
- Ben Wallace-Crabbe – bass guitar (1979–81)
- Jeffrey Wegener – drums, percussion (1979–82, 1983–84, 2009–2010)
- Dan Wallace-Crabbe – piano (1980–1981)
- Peter Doyle – trumpet (1981–83)
- Louise Elliot – saxophone, flute (1981–82, 1983–84, 2009–2010)
- Leslie Millar – bass guitar (1981–1983)
- John Weinzieri – bass guitar (1982)
- Chris Abrahams – piano (1983)
- Peter Milton Walsh – bass guitar (1983)
- Paul Smith – bass guitar (1983–84)
- Louis Tillett – piano (1984)

== Discography ==
=== Studio albums ===
- Mr Uddich-Schmuddich Goes to Town LP (Prince Melon) March 1982
- Law of Nature LP/CD (Hot) April 1984 #1 Australian Indie
- Ghosts of an Ideal Wife LP/CD (Hot) August 1985

=== Compilation albums ===
- Throne of Blood/Reign of Terror aka the Greatest Hits 1980 LP (Prince Melon) July 1981
- Laughter Around The Table LP (Red Flame) 1983
- History of Rock 'n' Roll Vol. 1 LP/CD (Hot) November 1984
- Golden Days – When Giants Walked the Earth CD (Hot) August 1995
- Cruel but Fair (The Complete Clowns Recordings) 3× CD (Hot) October 2005

=== Live albums ===
- Prince Melon Bootleg Series Volume 7: Laughing Clowns Live CD (Prince Melon) March 2009
- Prince Melon Bootleg Series Volume 8: Laughing Clowns Live at the Basement CD (Prince Melon) January 2010
- Prince Melon Bootleg Series Volume 16: don't ask stupid questions to an artist, cop (Laughing Clowns Live 1982) CD (Prince Melon) 2010

=== Extended plays ===
- Laughing Clowns MLP (Missing Link) May 1980
- Sometimes, the Fire Dance.... 7" (Prince Melon) January 1981
- Laughing Clowns 3 MLP (Prince Melon) March 1981
- Everything That Flies... 12" EP (Prince Melon) July 1983

=== Singles ===
- "Theme from Mad Flies, Mad Flies" 7" (Prince Melon) March 1982
- "Eternally Yours" 12" (Hot) March 1984 #2 Australian Indie, #40 UK Indie
- "Just Because I Like" / "Crystal Clear" 7" (Hot) February 1985
