= Sounds of Australia =

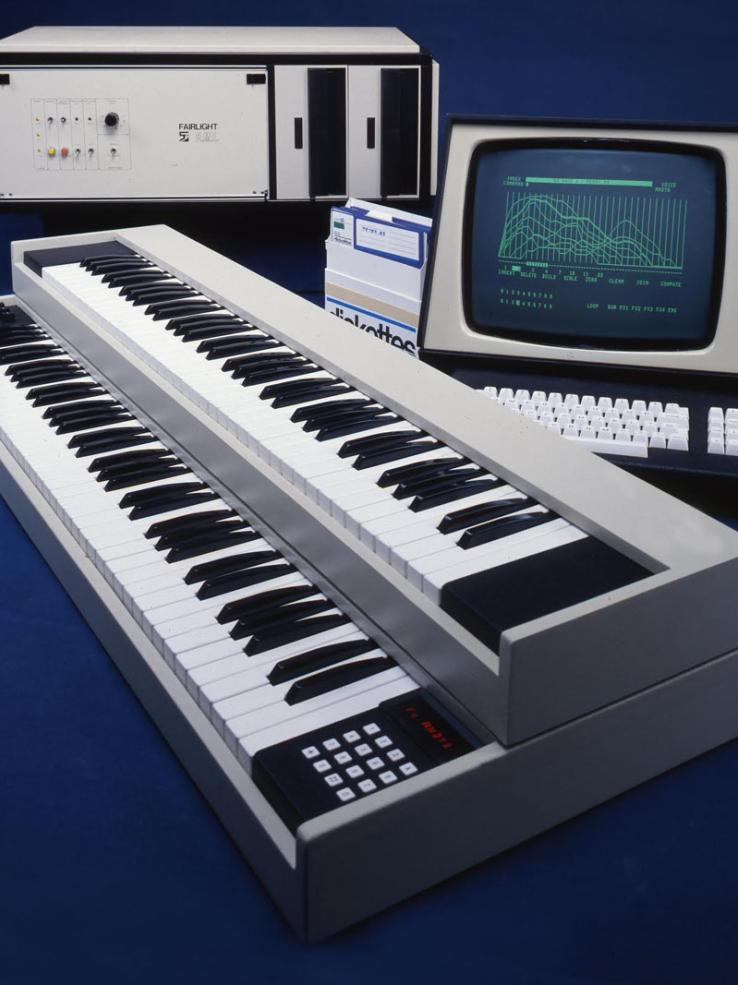
- The Fairlight CMI, the world’s first polyphonic digital sampling synthesizer, invented in 1979 by Peter Vogel and Kim Ryrie, was added to the Sounds of Australia in 2015
- Awarded for: The National Film and Sound Archive's annual capsule of iconic Australian audio moments.
- Country: Australia
- Presented by: National Film & Sound Archive
- Eligibility: Eligible sound recordings must be Australian and at least 10 years old. The final selection is curated by a panel of industry experts and NFSA curators, with input from public nominations.
- First award: 2007
- Website: www.nfsa.gov.au/sounds

The Sounds of Australia, formerly the National Registry of Recorded Sound, is the National Film & Sound Archive's selection of sound recordings deemed culturally, historically, and aesthetically significant and relevant for Australia. It was founded in 2007.

== History ==
The National Registry of Recorded Sound was established in 2007 by the National Film and Sound Archive to encourage appreciation of the diversity of sounds recorded in Australia, since the first phonographs made by the Edison Manufacturing Company were available in Australia in the mid-1890s.

The earliest recording in the archive is "The Hen Convention", a song recorded before 15 January 1897 by an amateur sound recordist, Thomas Rome of Warrnambool, who imported the most modern equipment from the United States. The song features the voice of John James Villiers, also of Warrnambool. It is a novelty song, featuring imitations of sounds made by chickens.

Other early sound recordings include Aboriginal Tasmanian women's songs (1899), Spencer and Gillen's 1901 recordings on wax cylinder of Arrernte, Anmatyerr, Kaytetye, Warumungu, Luritja, and Arabana peoples of central Australia (added in 2019), and Ernest Shackleton talking about his polar expedition in 1910.

== Description ==
As part of the National Film and Sound Archive (NFSA), it is part of a "living archive", to share in many ways and to keep for future generations.

The Australian public nominates new sounds to be added each year, with final selections determined by a panel of industry experts and NFSA curators. There are usually about ten recordings added each year. They represent significant achievements in how we have recorded the sounds of our history and memory.

The criteria for nomination are wide: "they can be popular songs, advertising jingles, famous speeches, radio broadcasts, or any other sound recordings" – but they must be Australian and be more than 10 years old.

== Recordings ==
In this table, "2007a" refers to the 2007 Foundation List (entries chosen before official voting began), while "2007b" refers to the first of the annual registry additions, also in 2007. The list of inductees for 2025 was skipped over.

Recording or collection	Performer or agent	Release year	Addition year	NFSA Title No.
"The Hen Convention"; Earliest extant Australian sound recording	John James Villiers	c. 1896	2007a	452097
"Chant Vénitien"	Dame Nellie Melba	1904	2007a	301462
”The Landing of the Australian Troops in Egypt” (Note: A simulated recording of Australian troops. They are greeted by a brass band playing, "Advance Australia Fair".)		1915	2007a	229758
"Along the Road to Gundagai"	Peter Dawson	1931	2007a	332353
"Give a Little Credit To Your Dad"/"Lonesome For You Mother Dear"	Buddy Williams	1939	2007a	190438
"Swanston St Shamble"/"Two Day Jag"	Graeme Bell's Dixieland Band	1944	2007a	232811
Tribal Music of Australia	Indigenous Australians from the Yirrkala district in Arnhem Land; recorded by A. P. Elkin	1953	2007a	242999
"She's My Baby"	Johnny O'Keefe	1960	2007a	291386
'Kerr's cur' speech	Gough Whitlam	1975, Nov. 11	2007a	156392
"Down Under"	Men At Work	1981	2007a	337398
Fanny Cochrane Smith's Tasmanian Aboriginal Songs	Fanny Cochrane Smith, recorded by Horace Watson	1899, 1903	2007b	500445
"My South Polar Expedition"	Sir Ernest Shackleton	1910	2007b	562537
Dad and Dave from Snake Gully; First episode	George Edwards, and others	1937, May 31	2007b	737158
"The Majestic Fanfare"; ABC radio news theme	Queen's Hall Light Orchestra; Charles Williams, conductor	1943	2007b	737182
"Maranoa Lullaby"	Harold Blair	1950	2007b	245797
Corroboree	Sydney Symphony Orchestra; Sir Eugene Goossens, conductor; John Antill, composer	1950	2007b	297286
Jack Luscombe oral history	Jack Luscombe; recorded by John Meredith	1953	2007b	737269
"Friday on My Mind"	The Easybeats	1966	2007b	258900
"(I'm) Stranded"	The Saints	1976	2007b	322350
"Jailanguru Pakarnu"	Warumpi Band	1983	2007b	244115
"Country Gardens"	Percy Grainger	1919	2008	510950
"Waltzing Matilda"	John Collinson, tenor; Russell Callow, piano	1926	2008	283469
The 1930 Australian XI: Winners of the Ashes	Don Bradman, Bill Woodfull, Clarrie Grimmett, Alan Kippax, Stan McCabe, Tim Wall	1930	2008	266765
"The Aeroplane Jelly Song"	Joy King	1938	2008	402848, 281850
Theme from Blue Hills ("Pastorale")	New Century Orchestra; Sidney Torch, conductor; Ronald Hanmer, composer	1949	2008	503205
"A Pub with No Beer"	Slim Dusty	1957	2008	190647
Irkanda IV	Melbourne Symphony Orchestra; John Hopkins, conductor; Peter Sculthorpe, composer	1967	2008	332275
Bird and Animal Calls of Australia	Recorded by Harold J Pollock	1968	2008	255276
"Most People I Know (Think That I'm Crazy)"	Billy Thorpe and the Aztecs	1972	2008	291714
"We Have Survived"	No Fixed Address	1981	2008	210397
London recordings	Newcastle Steelworks Band; Albert Baile, conductor	1924	2009	560469
"Happy Little Vegemites"	Betty Parker, Stephen Parker, Julia Parker, and Linda Marcy	1959	2009	537271
Smoky Dawson and the Adventure of The Singing Bullet	Smoky Dawson	1955	2009	281755
"My Country"	Read by Dorothea Mackellar	1958	2009	328116
Georgia Lee Sings the Blues Down Under	Georgia Lee	1962	2009	511557
In the Head the Fire	South Australian Symphony Orchestra, Sydney Symphony Orchestra, Adelaide Singers, and other soloists and vocalists; John Hopkins, conductor; Nigel Butterley, composer	1966	2009	323123
Lionel Rose wins the World Title	Ron Casey	1968	2009	283495
"I Am Woman" (Note: This recording is also preserved in the American National Recording Registry.)	Helen Reddy	1972	2009	619633
The Loner	Vic Simms	1973	2009	757646
"Treaty"	Yothu Yindi	1991	2009	226648
"Hinkler's Message to Australia"/"Incidents of My Flight"	Bert Hinkler	1928	2010	267488
"Wrap Me Up In My Stockwhip and Blanket"	Tex Morton	1936	2010	365991
Announcement of the declaration of World War II	Robert Menzies	1939, Sep. 3	2010	188388
Announcement of war with Japan	John Curtin	1941, Dec. 8	2010	677049
"Bye Bye Baby"	Col Joye	1959	2010	271642
Pick a Box	Bob and Dolly Dyer	1963, Aug. 20	2010	569
Just the Beginning	Don Burrows Quartet	1971	2010	263853
"Eagle Rock"	Daddy Cool	1971	2010	300956
Opening concert of the Sydney Opera House	Sydney Symphony Orchestra; Sir Charles Mackerras, conductor; Birgit Nilsson, soprano	1973, Sep. 29	2010	766280
Commentary of the 4 x 100 men's medley relay final at the Moscow Olympics	Norman May	1980, Jul. 24	2010	750967
"We Are Going"	Oodgeroo Noonuccal (Kath Walker)	1986	2010	699094
Rebetika Songs	Apodimi Compania	1987	2010	138939
"From Little Things Big Things Grow"	Paul Kelly and Kev Carmody	1993	2010	244410
Redfern Park speech	Paul Keating	1992, Dec. 10	2010	
Recordings of the Cambridge Anthropological Expedition to the Torres Straits	Alfred Cort Haddon and others	1898	2011	8879
"The Sailors"	Stiffy and Mo	1927	2011	253375
Ken Howard calls the Melbourne Cup	Ken Howard	1941, 1952 (Note: Contemporary articles and archived NFSA webpages suggest either the 1952 race or both races were the original selections; the site now only lists the 1941 race.)	2011	338699
The maiden parliamentary speeches of Dame Enid Lyons and Dorothy Tangney	Dame Enid Lyons, Dame Dorothy Tangney	1943–1944	2011	483285, 483102
The Art of the Prima Donna	Dame Joan Sutherland	1960	2011	321750
"I'll Never Find Another You"	The Seekers	1964	2011	82220
Living in the 70's	Skyhooks	1974	2011	263933
Report on Cyclone Tracy, Darwin	Mike Hayes and Bruce Grundy	1974	2011	
"I Should Be So Lucky"	Kylie Minogue	1987	2011	376096
Voss	Australian Opera Chorus, Sydney Symphony Orchestra; Stuart Challender, conductor; Geoffrey Chard, Marilyn Richardson and other soloists; Richard Meale, composer; David Malouf, libretto	1987	2011	230032
"The Black Watch"	Percy Herford	c. 1907	2012	778653
Sydney recordings	Queenie and David Kaili	1927–1932	2012	
Grace Gibson Productions radio serials	Various artists, produced by Grace Gibson	1944–c.1982	2012	
The Luise Hercus Collection, AIATSIS Audiovisual Archive	Dr Luise A Hercus	1962–1997	2012	
"Royal Telephone"	Jimmy Little	1963	2012	319442
Patrol from Da Nang	Tim Bowden	1966	2012	
A Track Winding Back	Barry Humphries and Dick Bentley	1972	2012	1063868
"It's a Long Way to the Top (If You Wanna Rock 'n' Roll)"	AC/DC	1975	2012	291607
Tender Prey	Nick Cave and the Bad Seeds	1988	2012	425260
Aether	The Necks	2001	2012	567489
"Hold Your Hand Out Naughty Boy"	Florrie Forde	1913	2013	189112
Yes, What?	Rex Dawe and others	1936–1940	2013	143364
"Bombora"	The Atlantics	1963	2013	291724
The Land Where the Crow Flies Backwards	Dougie Young	1964	2013	244102
"The Real Thing"	Russell Morris	1969	2013	338066
"I Still Call Australia Home"	Peter Allen	1980	2013	291702
Improvisations in Acoustic Chambers	Ros Bandt	1981	2013	230121
This Sporting Life	Roy and HG	1986–2008	2013	
Recording of a superb lyrebird at Healesville, Victoria	Greg Wignell	1987	2013	
"Took the Children Away"	Archie Roach	1990	2013	376653
"They Always Follow Me"	Syria Lamonte	1898	2014	1251712
Speech at the opening of the Columbia Graphophone Company Australian factory	Sir Dudley de Chair	1926	2014	774314
Concert in a cave at Tobruk	Recorded by Chester Wilmot, ABC Field Unit	1941, Oct.	2014	1341683
"Fireworks" and "The Orgasmic Opus"	Dr Val Stephen	1967	2014	1131993
"Khe Sanh"	Cold Chisel	1978	2014	260154
"Boys in Town"	Divinyls	1981	2014	296374
"Great Southern Land"	Icehouse	1982	2014	428036
"Cattle and Cane"	The Go-Betweens	1983	2014	736789
Recording of a lone dingo	Vicki Powys	1990	2014	1221379
Deadly Sounds	Vibe Australia; hosted by Rhoda Roberts	1993–2014	2014	696283
Message recorded at Mena Camp, Cairo	Second Lieutenant Henry Miller Lanser	1914	2015	1488057
"Love Will Find a Way"	Gladys Moncrieff	1926	2015	273694
"Argonauts Row"	Harold Williams	1941	2015	569911
Aboriginal recordings on the north-west coast	John Hutchinson	1959	2015	1275952
Sampling sounds	Fairlight CMI	1979–1989	2015	
"I Was Only 19 (A Walk in the Light Green)"	Redgum	1983	2015	376284
"Like Wow – Wipeout"	Hoodoo Gurus	1985	2015	305311
"Alive and Brilliant"	Deborah Conway	1993	2015	803963
"LSD"	DJ HMC	1995	2015	1458675
"The Nosebleed Section"	Hilltop Hoods	2003	2015	661178
"When Father Papered the Parlour"	Billy Williams	1912	2016	189178
"Life Without Love"	Frank Coughlan's Trocadero Orchestra	1937	2016	268433
"Skippy the Bush Kangaroo"	Eric Jupp	1968	2016	495512
"C'mon Aussie C'mon"	The Mojo Singers	1978	2016	409679
"And the Band Played Waltzing Matilda"	Eric Bogle	1980 (Note: The NFSA uses the 1980 recording, but lists it by the year of its composition, 1971.)	2016	82399
"Power and the Passion"	Midnight Oil	1982	2016	217837
"Sounds of Then (This is Australia)"	GANGgajang	1985	2016	220914
Antarctica: Suite for Guitar and Orchestra	Tasmanian Symphony Orchestra; Nigel Westlake, composer	1997	2016	1461560
"My Island Home"	Christine Anu	1995	2016	263311
"Toot Toot, Chugga Chugga, Big Red Car"	The Wiggles	1998	2016	370632
"Sweet Spirit Hear My Prayer"	Marie Narelle	1910	2017	189109
"Our Don Bradman"	Len Maurice	1930	2017	190535
Australia's Amateur Hour	AWA	1940–1958	2017	
"Louie the Fly"	Ross Higgins	1962	2017	281802
"I Remember You"	Frank Ifield	1962	2017	303276
"Play School Theme (There's a Bear in There)"	Various performers	1966, 1976, 1987, 2000, 2011	2017	
"Love Is in the Air"	John Paul Young	1977	2017	310545
Brand New Day (Milliya Rumarra)	Kuckles	1981	2017	
"Don't Change"	INXS	1982	2017	315857
"Not Pretty Enough"	Kasey Chambers	2001	2017	529136
"Caro Mio Ben"	Ada Crossley	1903	2018	757100
"Freshie"/"After the Dawn"	Sydney Simpson and his Wentworth Café Orchestra	1926	2018	196416
Binny Lum Collection	Binny Lum and interviewees	1955–1967	2018	
"Come Closer to Me"	Pilita Corrales	1959	2018	322824
"I've Been Everywhere"	Lucky Starr	1962	2018	306316
"Girls in our Town"	Margret RoadKnight	1976	2018	287049
"Solid Rock"	Goanna	1982	2018	303972
Songlines: Songs of the East Australian Humpback Whales	Mark Franklin (The Oceania Project)	1992–2008	2018	1543251
"These Days"	Powderfinger	1999	2018	463749
Gurrumul	Geoffrey Gurrumul Yunupingu	2008	2018	758793
Cylinder recordings from Central Australia	Baldwin Spencer, Francis James Gillen and Aboriginal communities	1901–1902	2019	
Twilight of the Gods (Die Götterdämmerung)	Florence Austral	1928	2019	273004
"I'm the Sheik of Scrubby Creek"	Chad Morgan	1952	2019	275674
Prestophone master tape ("Old Rugged Hills"/"Rhythm of Corroboree", "When My Homeland is Calling"/"Maranoa Moon")	Olive and Eva	1955–1956	2019	249178
"The Man from Snowy River"	Leonard Teale	1956	2019	193755
"You're the One That I Want"	Olivia Newton-John and John Travolta	1978	2019	222298
"Up There Cazaly"	The Two-Man Band	1979	2019	290258
"You're the Voice"	John Farnham	1986	2019	296286
"Truly Madly Deeply"	Savage Garden	1997	2019	499765
Wild Swans	Tasmanian Symphony Orchestra; Elena Kats-Chernin, composer	2005	2019	721303
"Starlight"	Hamilton Hill	1907	2020	1543945
"Étude de concert in F minor"/"Étude de concert in A flat major"	Eileen Joyce	1933	2020	401155
Olympic Games, Melbourne 1956: Opening and closing ceremonies Official souvenir recordings		1956	2020	312957, 312955
Nausicaa: Opera in Three Acts	Athens Symphony Orchestra, conducted by Carlos Surinach; Peggy Glanville-Hicks, composer	1961	2020	701032
Arnhem Land Popular Classics	David Blanasi (didgeridu), Djoli Laiwanga (vocals), and other performers; recorded by La Mont West Jr.	1963	2020	210787
"Because I Love You"	The Masters Apprentices	1971	2020	320598
"It's Time"	Alison MacCallum and others	1972	2020	253356
"True Blue"	John Williamson	1986	2020	224765
"Tomorrow"	Silverchair	1994	2020	295091
Martin/Molloy	Tony Martin and Mick Molloy	1995–1998	2020	
"The Absent-Minded Beggar"	John J Virgo	1900	2021	1621951
"Where the Dog Sits on the Tuckerbox"	Jim Davidson's Dandies and Dick Cranbourne	1938	2021	190972
First parliamentary sitting broadcast: Announcement of Victory in Europe	Ben Chifley and Robert Menzies	1945, May 8	2021	81384
"He's My Blonde Headed, Stompie Wompie, Real Gone Surfer Boy"	Little Pattie and The Statesmen	1963	2021	315308
"Heading in the Right Direction"	The Renée Geyer Band	1975	2021	259069
Gaywaves	Gaywaves Collective, 2SER	1979–2005	2021	
The Man from Snowy River soundtrack	Bruce Rowland	1982	2021	286452
"Wide Open Road"	The Triffids	1986	2021	420900
Apology to The Stolen Generations	Kevin Rudd	2008, Feb. 13	2021	759728
"Somebody That I Used to Know"	Gotye, featuring Kimbra	2011	2021	1064570
Farewell Address to Australia	Hallam Lord Tennyson	1904, Jan. 20	2022	
"Digger"	Jack Lumsdaine	1942	2022	190905
Horrie Dargie Concert	The Horrie Dargie Harlequintet	1952	2022	281525
"The Drover’s Dream" (Note: The media release also includes the B-side of the record: "The Drover's Dream"/"The Bullockies' Ball".)	Alan Scott and The Bushwhackers	1955	2022	301526
Decimal currency jingle	Ted Roberts	1965	2022	205358
"The Lord’s Prayer"	Sister Janet Mead	1973	2022	335577
"Stayin' Alive"	Bee Gees	1977	2022	322493
Neighbours theme song	Barry Crocker	1987	2022	301375
Bicentenary protest coverage	Radio Redfern	1988, Jan. 26	2022	
Misogyny speech	Julia Gillard	2012, Oct. 9	2022	
"Anvil Chorus"	P.C. Spouse	1927	2023	190551
Sweet Nell of Old Drury	Nellie Stewart and others	1931	2023	307950
Death of a Wombat	Ivan Smith, author; George S. English, composer; Alastair Duncan, narrator; Sydney Symphony Orchestra conducted by Nicolai Malko	1961	2023	366622
"I Only Came to Say Goodbye"	Wilma Reading	1961	2023	315918
"The Loved One"	The Loved Ones	1966	2023	798901
"Howzat"	Sherbet	1976	2023	314105
"Menstruation Blues"	Robyn Archer	1977	2023	139169
Harry Williams and the Country Outcasts	Harry and Wilga Williams and the Country Outcasts	1979	2023	235611
"Slip! Slop! Slap!" jingle	Peter Best and Phillip Adams; Cancer Council Victoria	1981	2023	
"I Am Australian"	Judith Durham, Russell Hitchcock, and Mandawuy Yunupingu	1997	2023	321473
Concerto of the Greater Sea	Joseph Tawadros; Australian Chamber Orchestra	2012	2023	1053312
Address to the Women's International Radio League	Jessie Street	1945, May 28	2024	
Speaking Clock	Gordon Gow and the Postmaster-General's Department	1954	2024	
Doctor Who theme	Ron Grainer, composer; Delia Derbyshire, musician and arranger	1963	2024	
Victoria Bitter advertisements	John Meillon, George Patterson Agency	1968	2024	
Jimmie Barker collections	Jimmie Barker	1968–1972	2024	
Earliest 2EA broadcasts in language	SBS Radio	1975, Jun.–Aug.	2024	
"Kickin' to the Undersound"	Sound Unlimited	1992	2024	
"Chains"	Tina Arena	1994	2024	
Last call of the Christmas Island pipistrelle	Zoos Victoria	2009, Aug. 26	2024	
Inaugural speech to Australian Parliament	Nova Peris	2013, Nov. 12	2024	
"You"	Marcia Hines	1977	2026	
"Shaddap You Face"	Joe Dolce Music Theatre	1980	2026	
PB/5 pedestrian crossing button	David Wood, Louis Challis, Frank Hulscher	1984	2026	
Tabaran	Not Drowning, Waving and the musicians of Rabaul featuring Telek	1990	2026	
"Democracy Manifest"	Jack Karlson	1991, Oct. 11	2026	
Reading Writing Hotline jingle	Peter Sullivan and Steve Goldberg	2001	2026	
"Scar"	Missy Higgins	2004	2026	
Federal Court native title determination at Noonkanbah Station	ABC Kimberley	2007, Apr. 27	2026	
Australian of the Year acceptance speech	Rosie Batty	2015, Jan. 25	2026	

== Statistics ==
The most recent recording on the list is the Australian of the Year acceptance speech by domestic violence campaigner Rosie Batty in 2015 while the oldest is Percy Herford's 1896 recording "The Hen Convention".

== See also ==
- National Recording Registry
- Culture of Australia
