= Dougie Young =

Australian musician (1930–1991)

- Born: Douglas Gary Young; 30 August 1933; Mitchell, Queensland, Australia
- Died: 1 April 1991 (aged 57); Wickham, Newcastle, New South Wales
- Spouse: Christina Johnson (m. 1955–1967)
- Musical career
- Also known as: Youngie Doug
- Genres: country
- Instruments: Vocals, Guitar

Dougie Young (30 August 1933 – 1 April 1991) was a singer and songwriter from South West Queensland. Young had a white father (Frank Young) and a Gurnu mother (Olive Kathleen née McCarthy).

Earlier in his life he worked as a stockman, during which he learnt the guitar and started writing songs. He married Christina Johnson on 11 December 1955 at St Therese's Catholic Mission Church at Wilcannia. A riding accident in 1957 ended his working as a stockman. In 1963 or 1964 Jeremy Beckett, an anthropologist made field recordings of Young, many of which were released in 1965 as an EP called Land Where the Crow Flies Backwards (Wattle). The title track has since been covered by Gary Shearston, Athol McCoy, Chad Morgan and Roger Knox. He was recorded twice more, first in Walgett in 1969 and then in Sydney in 1979 (soon after a report of his death). Songs from these three recordings were released by AIATSIS in 1993 as The Songs of Dougie Young.

Young sang "Cut A Rug", a drinking song from his troubadour days in Wilcannia in the 1950s and 1960s, in both the SBS documentary and accompanying CD, Buried Country: The Story of Aboriginal Country Music.

Young's song The Land Where the Crow Flies Backwards was added to the National Film and Sound Archive's Sounds of Australia registry in 2013.

== Discography ==
- Land Where the Crow Flies Backwards (1965) Wattle
- Dougie Young songs featured in the film "Backroads" (dir: Phillip Noyce 1976)
- The Songs of Dougie Young (1993) AIATSIS
