= The Donovans =

Australian Aboriginal country band

The Donovans (The Donovan Band) are an Australian Aboriginal country music band whose members include Michael Donovan, his brother Ashley and any number of family members, including renown solo artist Emma Donovan.

The Donovans have been playing together since their first official gig in 1984 at the Fire Brigade Ball in Mt Druitt. The Donovans grew up surrounded by the country sounds of Aboriginal country music legends, the late Mick and Aileen Donovan.

The Donovans have performed at a variety of family, community and corporate functions across the country with the likes of Jimmy Little, Roger Knox, Vic Simms, Warren H Williams, Troy Cassar Daley, and Bobby McLeod.

Michael and Ashley's late sister Agnes Donovan was instrumental in continuing the musical legacy of her parents and encouraging her brothers, children, nieces, nephews, and grandchildren in their music endeavours.

The Donovan Band won a Deadly Award in 2004.

They are members of a large musical family who were profiled in an episode of ABC's Dynasties television series.

== Members ==
- Michael Donovan – Bass guitar, lead vocalist
- Ashley Donovan - Rhythm guitar, lead guitar and backing vocalist
- Merv Donovan – Lead guitar and backing vocalist
- Robert Graham - Drums
- Shalina Donovan - Acoustic guitar and vocalist
- Jaleesa Godson - Vocalist and percussion

=== Michael Donovan ===
Michael Donovan grew up in Macksville, NSW surrounded by the country sounds of his parents, the late Mick and Aileen Donovan. He has been in the music industry for 51 years, singing and playing guitar by the age of six. Michael credits his mum and dad as being his greatest inspiration. His memories of his upbringing of music started in Eungai Rail, NSW. Michael’s dad Micko taught him to play the ukulele and then began performing with his late sister Agnes, and brothers Merv and Hilton. Michael moved to Sydney in 1981 where he formed The Donovan Band. Michael has toured Australia with the legendary Brian Young Show across Australia including Airlie Beach in Queensland, Mt Isa, Tennant Creek, Yuendumu and Alice Springs. Michael was also the musical director for the Aboriginal Showcase which was held annually across 3 years at the Tamworth Country Music Festival in the late 1990’s.

Michael was a member of the band Runaway Train for two years performing at an Australia Day Concert with the late Slim Dusty and Lee Kernaghan in Tamworth. Runaway Train was nominated for a Golden Guitar in 1998.

A career highlight for Michael was playing for Elizabeth II with Uncle Jimmy Little in Canberra at a Museum Opening. He has also cited performances at the Country Music Concert in Kempsey featuring John ‘Doc’ Riley, Fibber Parker and the late Ricky Shipp among his fondest memories.

Michael is working on his first solo album.

=== Merv Donovan ===
Merv Donovan has enjoyed playing music over many years performing with his Family as “The Donovan Kids” as a young man before forming a School Band. Merv went onto perform with the local Band Zachariah for a number of years performing in across a variety of pubs and clubs.

Merv moved to Sydney in 1977 and continued to perform with his brothers in The Donovan Band as well as linking in with a band which included Candy Williams in the Prison Concert Program. The Donovan Brothers linked up and formed a band called Koorie Klassics with a regular gig at La Perouse Yarra Bay Sailing Club and following this up working as The Donovan Band at Redfern RSL.

Merv also performed regularly with The Donovan Band at the Annual Tamworth Country Music festival.

In 2004 Merv supported his niece Emma Donovan along with fellow musician Alan Morris at the Cultural Festival leading up to the Greece Olympics in Athens.

=== Ashley Donovan ===
Ashley Donovan is the youngest of The Donovan Family and was taught by his dad Micko to play the guitar. He has performed as a member of the Donovan Band for 30 years playing lead guitar, drums and backup vocals. Ashley’s versatility changed when he went from playing acoustic guitar to lead guitar for The Donovan Band. Ashley has performed at various events such as The Survival Concert at La Perouse, Yabun Concert in Redfern, NAIDOC events and at the Annual Tamworth Country Music festival.

Ashley was also the lead guitarist for Dale Huddleston for 10 years. Ashley has broadened his experience by sharing the stage with Troy Cassar Daley, Vic Sims, Archie Roach and the legendary Col Hardy. Ashley completed studio recording on a children's CD Happy To Be Me, by Aunty Wendy's Mob launched on 8 September 2004 at Darlington Primary School. Ashley is featured on drums and guitar.

Ashley has completed his Certificate II, III and IV in Music and in more recent years has continued the family musical legacy through his interest of DJ’ing.

=== Shalina Donovan ===
Shalina has had a lifelong love of music inspired by her late grandparents Micko and Aileen Donovan. Her father has been her biggest influence in music since a young age, encouraging her to sing and play the guitar. As long as she can remember, Shalina has performed alongside her musical family at various events. At the age of 15 Shalina was accepted into Campbelltown Performing Arts high school, where performing as a soloist at school and community events became second nature.

Whilst performing in many talent quests over the years, Shalina’s biggest achievement was becoming the Overall Junior Winner of the Tamworth Country Music Aboriginal showcase in 2002. In 2003 Shalina graduated year 12 and continued her music performing at such events as Survival Day, the Woodford festival QLD, Sydney Dreaming and the Tamworth Country Music Aboriginal showcase where she performed with many Indigenous artists.

In 2005 Shalina became a permanent member of The Donovan Band and has been performing with them as an acoustic guitarist at many locations doing a variety of cultural and community events, balls and conferences. Shalina is still currently performing as a part of The Donovan Band whilst working full time, whilst also juggling being a mother of four beautiful children whom she hopes will also continue the family musical legacy.

=== Jaleesa Godson ===
Jaleesa Godson was born in Bankstown, NSW and grew up in the South Western Sydney. Country Music has been a major influence on Jaleesa growing up. At the young age of four, Jaleesa joined her father Michael Donovan on stage continuing the musical legacy of her Grandparents Micko and Aileen Donovan. It wasn’t long before Jaleesa’s mother Louise and her late Aunty Agnes would enter her into Country Music Talent Quests all across NSW including busking on the streets of Tamworth during the annual Country Music Festival.

Jaleesa was able to fulfil her genuine love for performing after being accepted into Campbelltown Performing Arts High School in 2003. Since then, Jaleesa has performed across a wide range of community events alongside her family and independently including the Aboriginal Country Music Showcase in Tamworth, Fairfield’s Annual Bring It On Festival, 2010 Villawood NAIDOC Day, Campbelltown Citizenship Ceremony, Redfern’s ANZAC Day Commemoration and a number of family gatherings.

With strong ties to her Aboriginal Culture Jaleesa was the MC for a number of years at the Bankstown NAIDOC Day event, participated in the 2004 Sydney Dreaming Festival and was also a member of the former Aboriginal Dance Group, Burrula. Since her teenage years, Jaleesa has dedicated much of her time to community engagement and cultural development for the benefit of communities across Greater Western Sydney.

== Awards ==
The Donovans won the award for Band of the Year at The Deadly Awards in 2004. They were nominated for two awards in 2003.

== Festival attendance ==
They have played at the Tamworth Country Music Festival, the 2004 Survival Concert at La Perouse and the 2004 Yabun Concert at Redfern, Sydney.

== See also ==
- Australian country music
