= Auriel Andrew =

Australian country music singer

Auriel Marie Andrew OAM

Background information
- Born: 1947; Darwin, Northern Territory, Australia
- Origin: Arrernte people
- Died: 2 January 2017 (aged 69) Shortland, New South Wales, Australia
- Genre: Aboriginal country
- Occupation: Singer
- Instrument: Guitar

Auriel Marie Andrew OAM (1947 – 2 January 2017) was an Australian country music singer from the Northern Territory. She was the first Aboriginal woman to appear on Australian television.

== Early life ==
Auriel Marie Andrew was born in 1947 in Darwin, the youngest of seven children, and grew up in Mparntwe (Alice Springs). She was cared for by her mother and step-father, "Dad Simmo". Her mother was an Arrernte woman from Central Australia, while her father was a white Australian. Her skin name was Mbitjana and her totem is the hairy caterpillar (Ayepe-arenye). Her mother was removed from her family to The Bungalow, where she was immersed in the English language, so Andrew never learnt her language. Her mother loved opera singer Mario Lanza pianist Winifred Atwell.

She started singing at the age of four.

After her parents' marriage broke down, when Andrew was four years old and her sister Lorraine was five, they were moved to Mount Isa, Queensland, to live with his father's cousin and her husband. Her father, being white, had the last say in taking the children from their mother.

== Career ==
Andrew made her stage debut at the Italian Club in Coober Pedy, before moving to Adelaide, South Australia aged 21 to pursue her music career. She worked with Chad Morgan around Adelaide and Port Lincoln, after moving there.

Her first album Just for You (1971) was only the second album made by an Indigenous woman in Australia, and she started appearing on live TV music broadcasts, which made her the first Aboriginal woman to appear on Australian television.

She moved to Sydney in 1973, and toured with Jimmy Little, Chad Morgan, and Brian Young. She performed at the Sydney Opera House for the venue's grand opening (20 October 1973), as well as the Tin Sheds at Sydney University. She moved to Newcastle in 1982, the hometown of her husband Barry Francis.

In 1985 she recorded her third album, the title taken from her skin name, Mbitjana, for CAAMA. This established her as a foremost interpreter of Aboriginal country music, featuring songs such as Bob Randall's "Brown Skin Baby", and songs by Herbie Laughton, and others, making the songs her own.

She sang "Amazing Grace" in Pitjantjitjara for Pope John Paul II during his Australian tour in 1986.

Andrew appeared in the comedic stage musical Sorry Seems to Be the Hardest Word (its name derived from the song "Sorry Seems to Be the Hardest Word"), written and performed by English artist Christopher Green. It was staged at the Adelaide Cabaret Festival in 2007, at the Beckett Theatre in Melbourne in 2011, and at the Darwin Festival in 2013.

Andrew's well-known recordings include the country classic "Truck Drivin' Woman" and Bob Randall's "Brown Skin Baby". Her 2013 album Ghost Gums included new original songs about her life and childhood.

After not performing for many years, in 2016 she joined the cast of the stage adaptation of Clinton Walker's Buried Country, which had its premiere in her hometown of Newcastle on 20 August. The show tells the story of Indigenous country music.

She has also performed at the Woodford Dreaming Festival and regularly performed at various clubs around the Newcastle area.

=== In film and television ===
Andrew appeared regularly on Channel Nine's The Country and Western Hour, hosted by Reg Lindsay until 1972. In the 1970s, Andrew was a regular guest on The Johnny Mac Show and The Ernie Sigley Show.

She also appeared on several other Australian television programs, including episodes of the drama series A Country Practice, Blue Heelers, and the mini-series Heartland (1994), as well as the children's program Playschool. She starred in Tracey Moffatt's 1993 horror film beDevil.

In 2007 she starred in the short film Hush (2007), directed by Dena Curtis, which was screened in several film festivals and won the audience award for Best Foreign Short Film at the 2008 Créteil International Women's Film Festival in France. It was one of a series called Bit of Black Business, which showcased Indigenous Australian filmmakers.

She appeared in the SBS documentary Buried Country: The Story of Aboriginal Country Music (2000) about Aboriginal country music (associated with the book by Clinton Walker), singing "Truck Driving Woman".

=== Teaching ===
Andrew taught Aboriginal culture in classrooms for 20 years, passing on her knowledge in schools in Queensland, the Northern Territory, and New South Wales.

== Awards and honours ==
In 1991, Andrew was inducted into the Tamworth Hands Of Fame at the Australian Country Music Awards at Tamworth.

In 2005, she was inducted into the Hall of Fame at the Northern Territory Indigenous Music Awards.

At the Deadly Awards 2008, Andrew was presented the Jimmy Little Lifetime Achievement Award for contribution to Aboriginal & Torres Strait Islander music.

In 2011, she was awarded the Order of Australia Medal (OAM), for service to country music as a singer, and to the Indigenous community.

== Later life and death ==
Andrew was living in Waratah West in 2016, when she was included in the cast of the touring show Buried Country. By that time she and her husband had grandchildren and great-grandchildren, but said that she felt lonely from not performing any more. She would ring up her former fellow performers, such as Col Harvey and Chad Morgan.

She died of cancer in Hunter Valley Private Hospital, Shortland, New South Wales, on 2 January 2017, after being admitted in December. She was 69 years old. Of her seven siblings, only sister Rhonda survived her.

She is buried in Wallsend Cemetery in Wallsend, a western suburb of Newcastle.

== Personal life ==
Andrew married Barry Francis and they had two children, Sarina and Reuben. Reuben was interviewed along with his mother in 2003 for the Rob and Olya Willis folklore collection for the National Library of Australia. In the recordings (copies of which are available), they talk about their lives, Auriel's career, cultural awareness education, Reuben's musicianship, and many other topics. Reuben is a largely self-taught multi-instrumentalist and songwriter, and was learning to play the didgeredoo. He later worked internationally, as a member of the Viper Creek Band.

Sarina married the son of country singer Roger Knox (with whom Auriel had worked), guitarist Buddy Knox (later divorced).

== Discography ==
Andrew produced one EP, Truck Driving Woman (1970), four albums, and one album-length cassette:

- Just For You (Nationwide, 1971)
- Chocolate Princess (Opal Records, 1982)
- Mbitjana (Imparja, 1985, 2010)
- Ghost Gums (2012)
- Let's Get Together (cassette; unknown date)
