= Buried Country =

Multiformat project on Aboriginal country music of Australia

Buried Country is the name of a documentary film, book, and soundtrack album released in 2000, and a stage show which toured from 2016 to 2018. A prosopography created by Clinton Walker, it tells the story of Australian country music in the Aboriginal community by focussing on the genre's most important stars.

== Components ==
The book Buried Country: The Story of Aboriginal Country Music by Clinton Walker was published by Pluto Press in 2000.

The Film Australia documentary was directed by Andy Nehl, written by Walker, and narrated by Kev Carmody.

The 2-CD set Buried Country: Original Film Soundtrack (Larrikin Records) produced by Walker contains 45 classic and rare tracks featured in the book and film.

Buried Country has also been produced as a touring stage show that had its premiere at the Playhouse in Newcastle, New South Wales in August 2016, starring surviving elders of the tradition and a younger generation of singers and songwriters. It continued to tour the festival circuit until 2018. It featured a rotating cast of the original artists, with backing band the Backtrackers.

== Featured artists ==
- 1940s-50s
  - Jimmy Little
  - Georgia Lee
  - Vic Sabrino
  - Herbie Laughton
- 1960s-70s
  - Dougie Young
  - Black Allan Barker
  - Lionel Rose
  - Vic Simms
  - Bobby McLeod
  - Harry and Wilga Williams
  - George and Ken Assang
- 1970s-80s
  - Gus Williams
  - Auriel Andrew
  - Bob Randall
  - Isaac Yamma
- 1980s-90s
  - Roger Knox
  - Kevin Gunn
  - Warren H. Williams
  - Kev Carmody
  - Troy Cassar-Daley
  - Archie Roach
  - Ruby Hunter
  - Tiddas
  - Warumpi Band
