= Black Allan =

Black Allan may refer to:

- Black Allan (horse) Foundation sire of the Tennessee Walking Horse
- Black Allan Barker, Australian musician
