= Harry and Wilga Williams =

Harry Williams and Wilga Munro
- Also known as: The Country Outcasts
- Genres: Australian country music
- Years active: 1960s–1970s

Harry "Buck" Williams (16 August 1927 – 1991) and Wilga Munro (born 1940 or 1943), known as Harry and Wilga Williams, were Aboriginal Australian musicians who performed professionally between the 1960s and 1980s, playing Aboriginal country music. They formed the band the Country Outcasts, also known as Harry Williams and the Country Outcasts.

== Harry Williams ==
Harry "Buck" Williams was born on 16 August 1927 on the Erambie Mission just outside the town of Cowra, New South Wales. His father, "Knocker" Williams, led a travelling tent show in which Harry played. His brother was Claude "Candy" Williams, also a musician.

In his 20s, Harry started playing with Alan Saunders.

He also worked as an actor, appearing in films and on TV, including Black Fire (1972, thought to be the first known film by an Indigenous Australian, directed by Bruce McGuinness) and Matlock.

Williams was called "the godfather of Koori country" (music).

His eldest son, with his first wife Ella Cooper Williams, Bertie Williams, who was in 1972 co-founder of the Aboriginal Tent Embassy.

Williams died in 1991 under the same tree he was born.

== Wilga Munro ==
Wilga Munro was born in Tamworth, New South Wales in 1940 or 1943, into a musical family, with four brothers and two sisters. Three of her four brothers became boxers, while one played rugby league for the Waratah Mayfield Cheetahs.

Biographies record that she was named after the wild orange tree she was born under. (Note: However, the tree known as the Wilga, Geijera parviflora (Australian willow), is not referred to as "wild orange" in the literature; this is used for Capparis mitchellii.) Her father taught her to play the button and piano accordions, and she learnt guitar which she was around 12–13. She learnt music by ear, practising performing at family gatherings and at church, and cites her musical influences as Patsy Cline and Jean Shepard.

She played in and toured the state with the Tamworth netball team, as well as coaching junior rugby and netball, along with her elder brother, and also played basketball. She joined the Royal Australian Air Force at the age of 19, serving from 1959 to early 1960s, before returning to Tamworth and started performing.

In 1963 she moved to Newcastle, New South Wales, where she met Williams at a friend's house, when she was 23.

== Joint career ==
At the time of meeting in 1963, Williams was looking for female vocalist for his band, The Tjuringas ("tjuringa"meaning sacred object). He heard her sing and on the same night asked her to join the band as bass guitar player, which he taught her to play.

Williams and Munro started performing together in The Tjuringas around Newcastle in 1971. Other members were Alan Saunders and Keith Saunders. Williams and Munro later began performing as a duo.

In 1972, Harry and Wilga moved to Mooroopna, Victoria, and formed the Country Outcasts in Melbourne, with Ian "Ocker" McKie and Harry's son Bert (Bertie) Williams. The band had a residency at the Grandview Hotel in Fairfield during much of the 1970s.

The first song recorded by the Country Outcasts was "Nullarbor Prayer", over several days in a studio in Currabubula. Written and narrated by Eric Onus (brother of Bill Onus), who came up from Melbourne, the song was included on their first album.

They toured widely throughout Australia and New Guinea and released two full-length albums. The Country Outcasts embraced a number of young artists during the seventies so the performance line-up often varied. Some of the other band members included Ray "Buster" Thomas, Bill Brunswick, Debbie Williams, Ian "Ocker" McKie, Carole Fraser, Ian "Bear" Johnson and his sisters Roslyn and Janice Johnson, Henry Thorpe, Laurie Ingram, Claude "Candy" Williams (Harry's brother), Mac Silva and Auriel Andrew.

The band toured many country festivals, including the Wandong Country Music Festival in 1975, and as part of the "All Aboriginal" Spectacular Show in Tamworth in 1995. In 1978 they performed at the Sydney Opera House, and in 1980 at the Myer Music Bowl in Melbourne. They also performed at the Adelaide Festival Theatre.

== Other work ==
In 1972, Harry and his son Bertie featured in Black Fire, a film by Bruce McGuinness, thought to be the first film directed by an Indigenous Australian person. (Note: However, a short film dating from 1946 made by Lin Onus was recently discovered, and features in his son Tiriki's film Ablaze (2021).)

Harry and Wilga Williams were instrumental in promoting the first National Aboriginal Country Music Festival in Canberra in 1976, as well as a country music radio show, Country Music Shindig, for Melbourne Community Radio Station 3CR.

In 1977, Film Australia made a half-hour documentary film called Country Outcasts, which followed Harry, Wilga and Gus Williams, Malcolm "Mac" Silva (1947–1989), and Auriel Andrew as they toured Aboriginal communities in central Australia. The tour included performances at Alice Springs, Hermannsburg, Papunya, and Yuendumu.

In 1978, Reg Poole, Merv Lowry, and Denis Payne created the Checkerboard Country Road Show, with the intention of having black and white Australians work together for a common cause. Harry and Wilga joined in, and in 1980 it became Checkerboard Promotions.

They moved to Canberra in 1981, from where they continued to organise their performances as well as run talent contests to encourage more young Aboriginal musicians.

After Harry's death in 1991, Wilga continued to perform at various special events, such as the Deadly Awards and health promotions.

== Recognition ==
Harry and Wilga were sometimes referred to as the "godfather and godmother of Koori country [music]". Clinton Walker sketched a portrait of the pair for his work Buried Country.

The band won awards at the Mooroopna Festival, including Best Male Vocalist for Harry, and he was also co-winner of the Best Songwriter award.

In 1981 Harry and Wilga were recognised in the Country Music Hands of Fame in Tamworth.

Wilga was recognised in Clinton Walker's 2018 book Deadly Women Blues, which was a history of black women in Australian music, for which he created an illustration of both Harry and Wilga. However, the book was withdrawn from sale owing to complaints from many of the subjects of the book about a number of glaring errors in it.

== Discography ==
- "Home-Made Didgeridoo"/Arnhem Land Lullaby" (1974)
- "Nullarbor Prayer" (1975)
- Harry Williams and the Country Outcasts (1979, RCA)
- Harry & Wilga Williams and the Country Outcasts (August 1981, Hadley)
