= Olive and Eva =

Australian musical duo (1950s)

- Years active: 1950s
- Members: Olive McGuiness; Eva Bell

Olive and Eva was a musical duo who put out the first commercial release in Australia by an all Indigenous act. Olive McGuiness and Eva Mumbler, née Bell, were cousins who in 1955 or 56 recorded four songs, all written by Grace O’Clerkin, which were released by Prestophone Records. In 2019 the recordings were added to the National Film and Sound Archive of Australia’s Sounds of Australia collection.

== Discography ==
- "Old Rugged Hills" / "Rhythm of Corroboree" (1955, Prestophone)
- "When My Homeland Is Calling" / "Maranoa Moon" (1956, Prestophone)
