= Simon Rieff =

Australian miner (1894–1962)

Simon Rieff (1894–1962) was one of the first miners to open up The Granites goldfield in the Northern Territory of Australia before moving to Alice Springs to become a property developer and business man.

== Early life ==
Rieff was a Cossack who came from Tbilisi (Georgia), when it was part of Russia and he left during the 1917 Russian Revolution and made his way to Australia. Rieff, travelling with a friend, made this journey overland through China to the coast and arrived in Bundaberg in 1919.

The friends planned to travel to Western Australia together with camels but they soon decided this would not be possible, due to their inexperience, and his friend decided to return to Russia.

== Life in the Northern Territory ==
Without his friend Rieff explored and prospected his way to Tennant Creek and worked in mines throughout Central Australia including Harts Range Mica Field, the Arltunga Goldfields (now Arltunga Historical Reserve) and the Hatches Creek wolfram field. Rieff spent some time at Hatches Creek and built a large home there for Dorothy, his Australian born wife, and their six children.

In 1927 Rieff was guide to Cecil Madigan and Sir Douglas Mawson who were inspecting nitrate deposits in the West MacDonnell Ranges where Aboriginal people had reported the soft, white, crystalline substance which burned readily. Ultimately this deposit was discovered to be of a high quality but not a large enough amount to be of commercial interest.

During the Granites gold rush of 1932 Rieff was one of the first men there, driving Madigan and F.E. Baume there in a buckboard utility, to report on the validity of the rush to the Sydney newspapers. Baume would later write: Tragedy track : the story of the Granites and in this book he called the track from Alice Springs to the mine: "a tragedy of desolation, 386 miles (600 km) of heat, flies, dust and spinifex!".

Despite, or perhaps because of Madigan's advice that the Granites would be uneconomical to mine Rieff pegged many leases there that he then travelled to Adelaide to sell them.

Following his time at the Granites Rieff, and his family, moved into Alice Springs, where they built a large home on Hartley Street that was unusually large for its time. While in Alice Springs he purchased and developed many commercial buildings including the Rieff Building which was demolished to make way for the Yeperenye Shopping Centre.

== Later life ==
Rieff died in 1962 and was survived by his wife Dorothy and their six children.

Rieff is also the father of Herbie Laughton, now a famous country music singer, who he never acknowledged; at least not in an official capacity. Laughton was taken from his Aboriginal mother and raised at The Bungalow in Alice Springs.

== Legacy ==
A sundial, at the base of ANZAC Hill in Alice Springs is dedicated to Rieff and is known as the Simon Rieff Memorial and it is part of the, larger, Central Australian Pioneers Memorial.

Rieff Court in Sadadeen, Alice Springs, is also named for him.
