= The Loner (Vic Simms album) =

Live album by Vic Simms
- Released: 1973
- Recorded: Bathurst Gaol
- Genre: Australian folk, Australian rock, country
- Length: 33:00
- Label: RCA

The Loner is a live album by Australian singer-songwriter, Vic Simms, which was recorded when he was incarcerated in Bathurst Gaol in 1973.

== Background ==
Vic Simms was convicted of a robbery in 1968 and was serving his seven-year sentence in Bathurst Gaol. While imprisoned he taught himself guitar and started song writing. The Robin Hood Foundation sent his demo tape to RCA Limited, which organised a mobile studio to be sent to the prison. Simms recorded his solo live album, The Loner, over one hour and it was released in 1973.

== Track listing ==
All tracks were written by Vic Simms (as William Victor Simms).

1. "Get Back into the Shadows"
2. "Poor Folks Happiness"
3. "Little Barefoot Urchin"
4. "Try to Understand"
5. "The Loner"
6. "Stranger in My Country"
7. "Everybody Had Known But Me"
8. "Living My Life by the Days"
9. "Karen’s Song"
10. "Anybody's Nobody"

== The Painted Ladies Play Selections from the Loner ==
During 2014 Brisbane musician, Luke Peacock, was converting analogue recordings into a digital archive when he came across, The Loner. With Simms aboard, he established the Painted Ladies, a loose collaboration of various Australian artists, to record an album, The Painted Ladies Play Selections from the Loner, which was issued on 26 May 2014 via Plus One Records.

Besides Simms and Peacock, the other musicians were The Medics (a Cairns-based group), Paul Kelly, Paddy McHugh, the Warm Guns Choir, John Busby, Greg Cathcart, Kahl Wallace, Roger Knox, Bunna Lawrie, and Rusty Hopkinson (of You Am I). Hopkinson also produced the recording.

In November 2017 The Painted Ladies Play Selections from the Loner was listed in the book The 110 Best Australian Albums by music journalists Toby Creswell, Craig Mathieson, and John O'Donnell.
