= PB/5 pedestrian crossing button =

Disability-friendly pedestrian crossing system

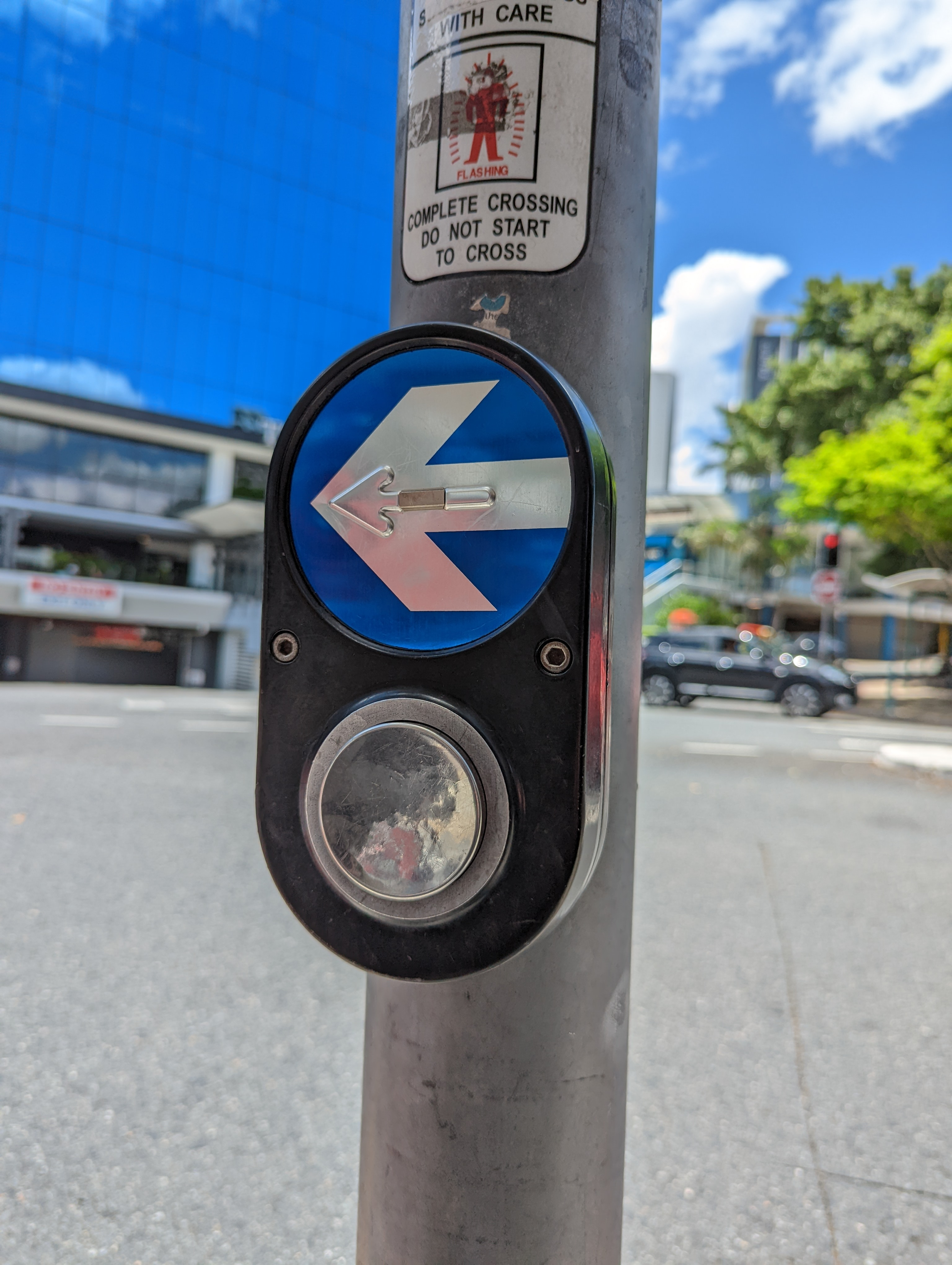
A PB/5 crossing button

Digital recreation of the PB/5 sound: the "don't walk" noise, followed by the more rapid "walk"

The PB/5 pedestrian crossing button or audio tactile pedestrian button is a pedestrian crossing system that assists hearing and vision impaired users.

It was designed in Australia in 1984 and features at pedestrian crossing locations in Australia, Ireland, New Zealand, Singapore and the United States. The design team was led by industrial designer David Wood, acoustical engineer Louis Challis and Frank Hulscher, an engineer with the New South Wales Roads & Traffic Authority.

Due to its loud beeping, and audio tactile interface, it is an example of the curb cut effect: a disability design which also benefits other users. In this case, the beeping keeps people alert and aware around road safety. The PB/5 has been featured in Australian design museums and academic journals.

== Features ==
The PB/5 was designed to assist both the vision and hearing impaired. It emits loud and rhythmic beeping that changes in tone and pace indicating the state of the crossing signals: slow chirp sounds for "don't walk" (described in the patent as a "locator sound") and an urgent "tick-tock-tick-tock" to signal the time for crossing. A single "kapow!" notifies the listener of a change in state. The volume is adjusted via a microphone which periodically monitors for traffic noise, so as to remain audible above it.

It also has a large embossed arrow on the front panel indicating the direction of the crossing. The tactile nature of the embossing is intended to function in conjunction with tactile paving to avoid any confusion. It is also designed to aid the hearing impaired as the embossed arrow on the front panel vibrates in-sync with the rhythmic beeps, giving hearing impaired people an immediate and tactile signal of when to cross.

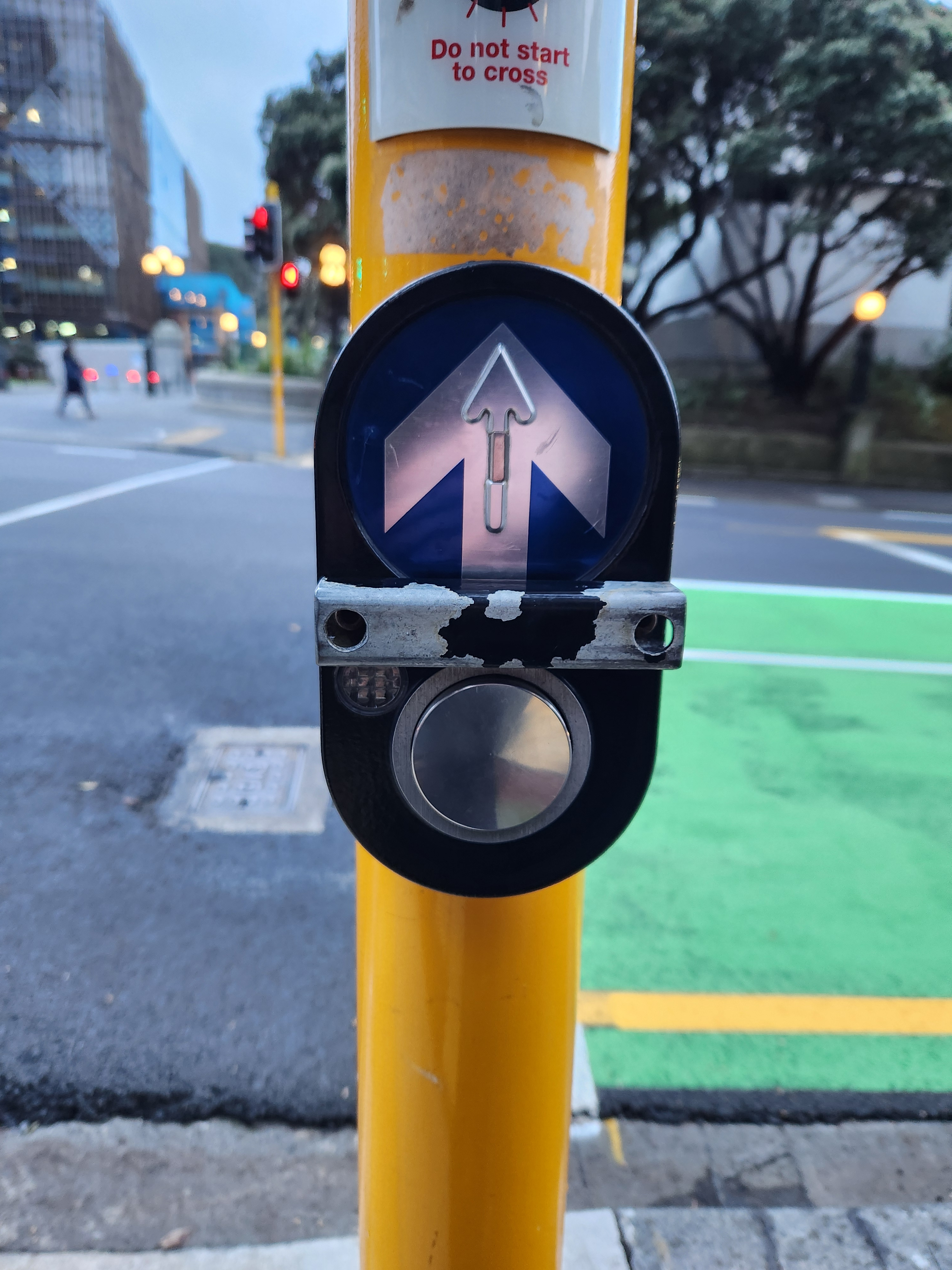
A metal bar in Bowen Street, Wellington

In Wellington and some other locations in New Zealand, a hollow metal bar is sometimes fitted between the push button and tactile arrow. The bars have been installed by councils to deter people from kicking the button and damaging the mechanism.

== Legacy ==
The sound of the pedestrian crossing system has become iconic in Australia and was inducted into the National Film and Sound Archive's Sounds of Australia in 2026.

The beeping signals from the PB/5 have been sampled in multiple songs, including Billie Eilish's "Bad Guy" and Giuseppe Ottaviani's "Crossing Lights".

== See also ==
- Pedestrian crossing § Enhancements for disabled people
