= Buddy Knox (guitarist) =

- Born: Australia
- Genres: Blues
- Occupation: Musician
- Instrument: Guitar
- Years active: present
- Label: Fanfare Records
- Member of: The Buddy Knox Project
- Formerly of: The Buddy Knox Blues Band

Buddy Knox is an Australian blues guitarist. He is also the son of Roger Knox.

== Background ==
The song of Roger Knox, a well-known Aboriginal country music performer, Buddy Knox first started playing guitar at the age of ten. He wanted to be like Chuck Berry. In 2006 he formed his band, the Buddy Knox Blues Band. According to the Northern Daily Leader, Knox carries the legacy of his father and grandfather. Between 2007 and late 2025, Knox has had seven albums released.

Knox says that he plays a 335 Gibson guitar.

His son is musician Googoorewon Knox aka Goori Knox.

Knox is a two-time Sydney Blues Society Performer of the Year winner.

== Career ==
In 2008, Knox's band The Buddy Knox Blues Band released their first album, The Factory. In 2010 the album Buddy's Blues was released.

It was reported in the 28 November 2017 issue of the Northern Daily Leader that Buddy Knox and his son Goori had won a major competition and in early 2018 they were to go to Memphis to compete in the International Blues Challenge.

In 2020, Knox's album Ticket to Memphis was released on Fanfare 350. The album, which was five years in the making, included the songs, "Big City Mean Streets", "Ticket to Memphis", "Bungunya", "Message in Stone" and "Second Chance".

In 2022, Knox was hosting a free workshop at the Yaama Ganu Gallery in Moree where he mentored young up and coming musicians.
