= Herbie Laughton =

Herbert Patrick Laughton (7 February 1927 - 2 December 2012) was a country singer from Alice Springs in the Northern Territory of Australia. He is also a member of the Stolen Generations.

In 2005 he was inducted into the hall of fame at Music NT's Indigenous Music Awards. He was one of the artists featured in the Buried Country documentary and book. His songs have been covered by Buddy Williams, Auriel Andrew and Trevor Adamson.

== Early life ==
Laughton was born on 7 February 1927 on a rocky outcrop on the edge of the Todd River in Alice Spring to Simon Rieff, a Russian miner, and a local Aboriginal woman whose name is not recorded. As a toddler he was taken from his mother, who he wouldn't see again till he was in his 20s, and was sent to The Bungalow, which was then at the Jay Creek site. When he was five The Bungalow moved to the Telegraph Station site and he walked, with a group, the 48 km distance from one to another.

Laughton started his music careers while at The Bungalow, following inspiration from country singer Tex Morton, who visited when he was just ten years old and his upbringing here inspired his song "Old Bungalow Days" and the history of Central Australia, more generally, became one of the main themes of his music.

Laughton lived at The Bungalow until the age of fifteen when he went to work on various stations throughout the Territory.

== Discography ==
- Herbie Laughton (1990) - Imparja
- Country From The Heart (1999)

=== Compilations ===
- Beat the Grog (1988) - CAAMA
- Desert Songs 1 (1982) - CAAMA
- Desert Songs 2 (1983) - CAAMA
- Fourth Nation Aboriginal Country Music Festival (1979)
- Papal Concert, Alice Springs (1982) - Imparja
- 25th Anniversary Compilation 1 (2006) - CAAMA
- Buried country (2006) - Larrikin Records
