= Louis Challis =

Australian acoustical engineer (1936–2017)

Louis Challis AM
- Born: Louis Aron Challis; 20 July 1936; Sydney, New South Wales, Australia
- Died: 3 June 2017 (aged 80); Sydney, New South Wales, Australia
- Education: University of Sydney
- Occupation: Acoustical engineer
- Known for: Architectural and environmental acoustics; audio-tactile pedestrian crossing signals

Louis Aron Challis AM (20 July 1936 – 3 June 2017) was an Australian acoustical engineer known for his work in architectural and environmental acoustics, including the acoustic design of major public buildings and infrastructure projects in Australia and overseas, and for his role in the development of the audio-tactile pedestrian crossing signal system used in Australia and other countries.

== Early life and education ==
Challis was born in Sydney on 20 July 1936. He attended Canterbury Boys' High School and studied at the University of Sydney, where he completed degrees in electrical engineering and architectural science. Early in his career, he worked at the Royal Australian Naval Research Laboratory at Rushcutters Bay and later at the Overseas Telecommunications Commission.

== Career ==
In the mid-1960s, Challis established his own consulting practice, Louis A. Challis & Associates, which became one of Australia's best-known specialist acoustics firms.

He worked on the acoustics of a number of major public projects, including Parliament House in Canberra, the Parliament Houses of New South Wales, Queensland and Papua New Guinea, the Sydney Harbour Tunnel, the Sydney 2000 Olympics project at Homebush Bay, the Royal Hospital for Women in Randwick and the Radio Australia studios in Melbourne.

Challis was involved in the development of the audio-tactile pedestrian crossing signal system for blind and deaf pedestrians. According to UNSW Sydney, he and his firm were engaged in the 1970s to redesign the audible crossing signal, contributing to the two-rhythm buzzer and vibrating touch panel later associated with the PB/5 pedestrian button design. The system combined an audible signal with a tactile vibration, allowing pedestrians who were blind, deaf, or deafblind to determine whether the crossing was showing a walk or do not walk phase by sound or touch. His design also provided for the audible signal to attenuate automatically at night in response to background noise levels, reducing disturbance to nearby residents. His University of Sydney honorary doctorate citation states that Challis declined an opportunity to patent the invention because he believed it should be made widely available at low cost, and the system was subsequently adopted throughout Australia and in many overseas cities. The sound later gained wider attention after it was reported to have been sampled in the song "Bad Guy" by Billie Eilish, and in 2026 the National Film and Sound Archive added the PB/5 pedestrian crossing signal to the Sounds of Australia.

He also contributed to Australian acoustical standards and environmental noise testing methodologies, and served as a specialist adviser in acoustics and forensic audio matters for government agencies. He served in the Royal Australian Air Force Reserve as a specialist adviser in acoustics and held the rank of wing commander.

== Honours ==
Challis was elected a Distinguished Corresponding Member of the Institute of Noise Control Engineering of the United States in 1993, became an Honorary Fellow of the Institution of Engineers Australia in 1998, was elected a Fellow of the Australian Academy of Technological Sciences and Engineering in 2000, and received the Centenary Medal in 2001.

In the 2005 Australia Day Honours, he was appointed a Member of the Order of Australia for service to engineering as a pioneer in environmental and architectural acoustic engineering, particularly the development of noise standards, acoustic planning and design of landmark buildings, and advancements in environmental noise testing.

In 2015, the University of Sydney awarded him the honorary degree of Doctor of Engineering (honoris causa).

== Death ==
Challis died on 3 June 2017.
