= Bobby McLeod =

Bobby McLeod (1947 – 30 May 2009) was an Aboriginal activist, poet, healer, musician and Yuin elder. He was from Wreck Bay Village, Jervis Bay Territory. He was involved in the fight for Aboriginal rights in Australia and travelled the world speaking about cultural lore, health and healing.

== Life ==
Bobby was born in 1947, the oldest of 6 kids, and a descendant of the Jaimathang, Gunai Kurnai, Monero, Wandandian, and Yuin people from south eastern Australia. He grew up at Worragee, an Aboriginal community outside Nowra. His father, Arthur, was a labourer and a boxer. His mother, Isabelle, was active in the Worragee-Wreck Bay chapter of the Country Women's Association and the local Baptist church. Her father was Robert Brown, the first Aboriginal stipendiary magistrate. His father's father was a black tracker on the NSW south coast. Bobby started his singing career in the Baptist Youth Fellowship choirs. He learnt to play the guitar from Jimmy Little's family.

Bobby completed his Intermediate at Nowra High School in 1963, excelling at sport. His family moved to the new "model suburb" of Green Valley in Sydney's south-west. In 1966, a Sydney City Mission report on the suburb described "a lack of community life, a breakdown in family life, large numbers of deserted wives, needy children and bewildered people". Within two years of moving there, Bobby had been sentenced to five years in jail for assault and robbery after a fight at Blacktown RSL.

After being released from prison in 1968, Bobby played rugby league for the Redfern All Blacks.

Bobby was in prison a second time in 1973 when his father died. He wrote his first song, "Wayward Dreams", after attending the funeral on day release.

After being released from jail, Bobby lived at the Aboriginal Tent Embassy on the lawns of parliament house in Canberra. On 28 February 1974, he achieved some notoriety when he "arrested" Francis Herbert Moy, an assistant secretary of the Department of Aboriginal Affairs (DAA), at gunpoint. The incident happened in the DAA offices in Canberra.

Earlier that day there had been a land rights demonstration when Queen Elizabeth and Prince Philip arrived at Parliament House for the opening of parliament.

Bobby had gone into the DAA office with Reuben John Smith and Neville Foster, looking for the department head, Barrie Dexter, who was away in Tasmania at the time. They held Moy and three other DAA staff members in the office for an hour and a half. Bobby allegedly told them "I'm going to keep you here for four or five days and teach you to starve".

After about an hour Charlie Perkins arrived from outside parliament house and convinced Bobby to give him the gun. Charlie removed the bullets from the gun, which he later handed over to the police. The fact that there were no bullets in the gun when it was given to the police meant that Bobby was only charged with possession of an unlicensed gun, rather than the much more serious charge that would have followed if it had been loaded.

Bobby was fined $40 for the incident and put on a 12-month good behaviour bond. He remained grateful to Charlie Perkins for having the presence of mind to remove the bullets. The matter was discussed in parliament.

A few days after the incident, during an interview on ABC radio, Bobby said "I would die for my people, I'm not frightened of that".

After that, Bobby left Canberra for Melbourne, where he played with a group called the Kooriers with Paul and Dudley (aka Doug) Meredith, a couple of musicians from Cherbourg in Queensland. They played a lot of union gigs and recorded a demo tape at the ABC studios. According to Bobby, the Kooriers music expressed "the confusion and frustration of Aborigines and their cultural dilemma which came as a result of westernisation".

Bobby said later that the reason why the Kooriers didn't go further than they did was because they drank too much. When the Meredith brothers left Melbourne, he immersed himself even more deeply in alcohol, singing here and there, but mostly devoting his life to drinking. He hit rock bottom in 1983 when he went into an alcohol-related coma for seven days, and nearly died. That was his wakeup call and he returned to Nowra, after an absence of twenty years, and gave up drinking permanently.

In 1987, Bobby played at the Tamworth Country Music Festival. While he was there, he met people from the Enrec recording studio and ended up recording with them, Buddy Knox and Mick Lieber. This led to his first album Culture Up Front being released by Larrikin Records in 1987.

In 1990, Bobby, along with Vic Simms, Roger Knox and the Euraba band were invited to North America by Indigenous Americans, to play prisons and reservations. When he got back to Australia, he recorded his second album Spirit Mother, backed by the Flying Emus. Talking about the change of mood from his previous album, Bobby said "[......] if you sing about the sorrow of things, it sort of keeps people in that sadness. So what I did [with Spirit Mother] was to try and change it to find out what was good about being me and stuff."

Inspired by his experiences with Indigenous people in Canada, Bobby set up the Doonooch Aboriginal Healing and Cultural Centre at Wreck Bay in 1990 - initially as an attempt to address the high levels of violence found in Aboriginal communities. 'Doonooch' refers to the owl dreaming.

In the early 1990s, he started the Doonooch dance group, primarily as a way to keep young Aboriginal people away from alcohol and other drugs and provide them with gainful employment and a cultural and spiritual awakening. In 2000 the Doonooch dancers performed at the Olympic Games opening ceremony and at the World Indigenous Forum in Noumea.

In 2002 Bobby McLeod co-taught, along with Dr. Tom Balistrieri, an engineering class at Worcester Polytechnic Institute titled, Indigenous Wisdom and Modern Technology. The class focused on Life Lore and Dead Lore and how engineers must take this into account when designing and building projects. Bobby lived in the home of Tom and Kathryn Balistrieri during that time.

McLeod's album Dumaradje was nominated for Best World Music Album at the 2005 ARIA Awards.

"Wayward Dreams" was featured in both the SBS documentary and the accompanying cd, Buried Country: The Story of Aboriginal Country Music.

== Selected performances ==
- Oz Against Apartheid, 26 June 1986, Selina's Coogee Bay Hotel
- With Roger Knox and Euraba Band, 5 December 1986, The Settlement, Chippendale
- Tamworth Country Music Festival, 1987, Tamworth
- Festival of Pacific Arts, August 1988, Townsville
- Building Bridges Music Festival, 26 January 1990, Bondi Pavilion
- Afrika Night, 24 March 1990, Paddington Town Hall
- Support People of the Rainforests, 14 October 1990, Paddington Town Hall

== Discography ==
=== Albums ===
List of albums
Title	Album details
Culture Up Front	Released: 1987; Label: Enrec (ENC 037); Formats: cassette
Sprit Mother	Released: 1993; Label: Larrikin Records (CDLRF 275); Formats: CD
Paradox	Released: 2001; Label: Presenza (BMAC 003); Formats: CD
Dumaradje	Released: 2005; Label: Acmec Records (ACMEC046); Formats: CD

== Awards and nominations ==
=== ARIA Music Awards ===
The ARIA Music Awards is an annual awards ceremony that recognises excellence, innovation, and achievement across all genres of Australian music. They commenced in 1987.

Year	Nominee / work	Award	Result	Ref.
2005	Dumaradje	Best World Music Album	Nominated	

== Books ==
- McLeod, Bobby (2008). Ngudjung Yugarang. Mothers Heartbeat: a collection of poems. ISBN 978-0-9580359-2-7.
- McLeod, Bobby (2002). Baby Gudjagah. BMAC Publishing. ISBN 0-9580359-1-1.
- McLeod, Bobby (2002). Juella and Ngudjung Ngulla. BMAC Publishing. ISBN 0-9580359-0-3.
