= Georgia Lee (singer) =

- Born: Ramer Lyra Pitt; 22 February 1921; Cairns, Queensland, Australia
- Died: 23 April 2010 (aged 89) Cairns, Queensland, Australia
- Genres: Pop, jazz, blues
- Occupations: Singer, actress

Ramer Lyra "Dulcie" Pitt, who performed as Georgia Lee (1921 – 2010) was an Australian jazz and blues singer and actress from Cairns. She is credited with being the first Indigenous Australian artist to record blues songs with her album, Georgia Lee Sings the Blues Down Under (1962).

== Early life ==
Georgia Lee was born as Ramer Lyra Pitt on 22 February 1921. Her father, Douglas Pitt Jr., (ca. 1877–1926) was of Jamaican, Scottish and Loyalty Islander descent and her mother, Myra Kemple-Hopkin's heritage was Afghani, Australian Aboriginal, Torres Strait Islander and Scottish. Her father, a fisherman, was a strong swimmer: he swam 25 miles (40 km) from a sinking lugger to shore during a cyclone off Cooktown in 1894.

Lee grew up in a musical family, her sisters Sophie and Heather were also singers, while her brothers Arthur and Walter were musicians. She had no formal musical training, but "learns her songs by ear."

== Career ==
With her sisters Sophie and Heather Pitt, she formed the Harmony Sisters, often joined by her brothers Arthur and Walter, and performed as part of the United States Service Office Show, touring Queensland to entertain US troops during World War II. One of these shows was described in October 1943, "Heather and Dulcie Pitt, sang two songs, accompanied by [two men] on guitars, and one of the sisters did a fascinating hula dance... [also] in the second half [they sang] two popular songs, and on both appearances they were most enthusiastically applauded."

After the war she took the name Georgia Lee and moved south to work in the cities and later in the United Kingdom. She performed and recorded with many artists and bands including Graeme Bell, Geraldo, Bruce Clarke, Port Jackson Jazz Band, George Trevare and the Max Williams Quintet. On Good Friday in 1947, as Dulcie Pitt, she sang "If I Had You" on radio programme Sports Parade and "in response to [listeners'] demand, she was given a repeat engagement." Thereafter she performed as Georgia Lee. Her delivery of "Blue Heaven" with Bell for a concert at the Century Theatre, Newcastle in October 1948 was described as a highlight for which she "gained most favour." During that year Lee was heard on Australian Broadcasting Commission (ABC)'s radio programmes, Show Business (Mondays) and The Hit Parade (Wednesdays) backed by Jim Gussey's ABC Dance Band.

Georgia Lee's 1948 rendition of the song Strange Fruit is possibly the first Australian performance of the song, and ultimately proved so controversial it was banned from radio. The Georgia Lee Exhibition by the Australian Jazz Museum includes song samples and memorabilia.

In late 1953 the singer relocated to London and was contracted to Geraldo's dance band by the following March. In December 1954 she declined a £2000 offer to renew her contract with Geraldo, preferring to sign with a new revue. In 1957 she toured with Nat King Cole on his Australian tour. In 1961, she acted in the television play Burst of Summer for the ABC, adapted from Oriel Gray's stage play. She also performed on TV on Graham Kennedy's In Melbourne Tonight and Bandstand.

Lee is credited with being the first Indigenous Australian artist to record blues songs. Her 1962 album Georgia Lee Sings the Blues Down Under may have been only the second album to be released by an Australian woman and was the first Australian album recorded in stereo. Arranged by Brian Martin, the album features Raphael Melevende on trumpet, Jack Glenn on trombone, Alec Hutchison on clarinet and tenor sax, Ron Rosenberg on piano, John Frederick on bass, Horrie Weems on guitar and Alan Turnbull playing drums. In 2009 it was added to the National Film and Sound Archive's Sounds of Australia registry.

== Death ==
Georgia Lee died on 23 April 2010, aged 89, in a Cairns nursing home. Her niece, Wilma Reading, is a singer in her own right.

== Discography ==
- "Graeme Bell Jazz Concert: Eps 1 and 5" (1949)
- "Graeme Bell Jazz Concert: Eps 10 and 14" (1949)
- "Graeme Bell Jazz Concert: Eps 19 and 23" (1949)
- Bruce Clarke Quintones — "St Louis Blues" (1951) Jazzart
- Bruce Clarke Quintones — "Blue Moon" (1951) Jazzart
- "Johnny Angel (song)" sung by Georgia Lee (1960)
- "It's A Lovely Day Tomorrow" (1961) Rex
- Georgia Lee Sings the Blues Down Under (1962) Crest

== Filmography ==
- Burst of Summer (1961 Television Version) as Peggy Dinjerra
