= Kurnu =

The Kula, also known as the Kurnu, were an indigenous Australian people of the state of New South Wales.

== Country ==
The Kula are estimated by Tindale to have held sway over roughly 4,900 square miles (13,000 km^{2}) of territory, predominantly on the western side of the Darling River, running from near Bourke to Dunlop. They were also around the Warrego River and at Enngonia and Barringun on the border with Queensland. Their western reach ran close to Yantabulla.

== Alternative names ==
- Cornu
- Gu:nu
- Guemo
- Guno, Gunu
- Komu
- Koonoo
- Kornoo
- Kumu (language name applied to the Kula but also to other Darling River tribes)
- Kuno
- Noolulgo

Source: Tindale 1974, p. 195

== Some words ==
- thirlta (kangaroo)
- karle/kulli (dog) (Note: R. H. Mathews noted down a list of parallel words for the terms used in common speech, calling this variant sacred idiom 'mystic speech', a secret language used for initiatory purposes. In this language, the word for kangaroo was burnki, and for dog munnidi, for example. (Mathews 1902, pp. 157–158))

== Sources ==
- Bonney, Frederic (1884). "On Some Customs of the Aborigines of the River Darling, New South Wales". Journal of the Anthropological Institute of Great Britain and Ireland. 13: 122–137. doi:10.2307/2841717. JSTOR 2841717.
- Howitt, Alfred William (1904). The native tribes of south-east Australia (PDF). Macmillan.
- Mathews, R. H. (January 1898). "Initiation Ceremonies of Australian Tribes". Proceedings of the American Philosophical Society. 37 (157): 54–73. JSTOR 983694.
- Mathews, R. H. (1902). "Languages of some native tribes of Queensland, New South Wales, and Victoria". Proceedings of the Royal Society of New South Wales. 36: 135–190, 154–159. doi:10.5962/p.359384.
- Mathews, R. H. (1904a). "Langage des Kurnu, tribu d'indigenes de la Nouvelle Galles du Sud". Bulletins et mémoires de la Société d'anthropologie de Paris. 5 (5): 132–138. doi:10.3406/bmsap.1904.7855.
- Mathews, R. H. (1904b). "Ethnological notes on the aboriginal tribes of New South Wales and Victoria". Journal and Proceedings of the Royal Society of New South Wales. 38: 203–381. doi:10.5962/p.359439.
- Mathews, R. H. (1904c). "Die Multyerra-Initiations Zeremonie". Mitteilungen der Anthropologischen Gesellschaft Wien. 34: 77–83.
- Mathews, R. H. (1906). "Notes on some native tribes of Australia". Proceedings of the Royal Society of New South Wales. 40: 95–129. doi:10.5962/p.359471.
- Pechey, W. A. (1872). "Vocabulary of the Cornu Tribes of Australia". Journal of the Anthropological Institute of Great Britain and Ireland. 1: 143–147. doi:10.2307/2840949. JSTOR 2840949.
- Radcliffe-Brown, A. R. (July–December 1918). "Notes on the Social Organization of Australian Tribes". Journal of the Anthropological Institute of Great Britain and Ireland. 48: 222–253. doi:10.2307/2843422. JSTOR 2843422.
- Ridley, William (1873). "Report on Australian Languages and Traditions". Journal of the Anthropological Institute of Great Britain and Ireland. 2: 257–275. doi:10.2307/2841174. JSTOR 2841174.
- Tindale, Norman Barnett (1974). "Kula (NSW)". Aboriginal Tribes of Australia: Their Terrain, Environmental Controls, Distribution, Limits, and Proper Names. Australian National University Press. ISBN 978-0-708-10741-6.
