= Wilma Reading =

Australian singer

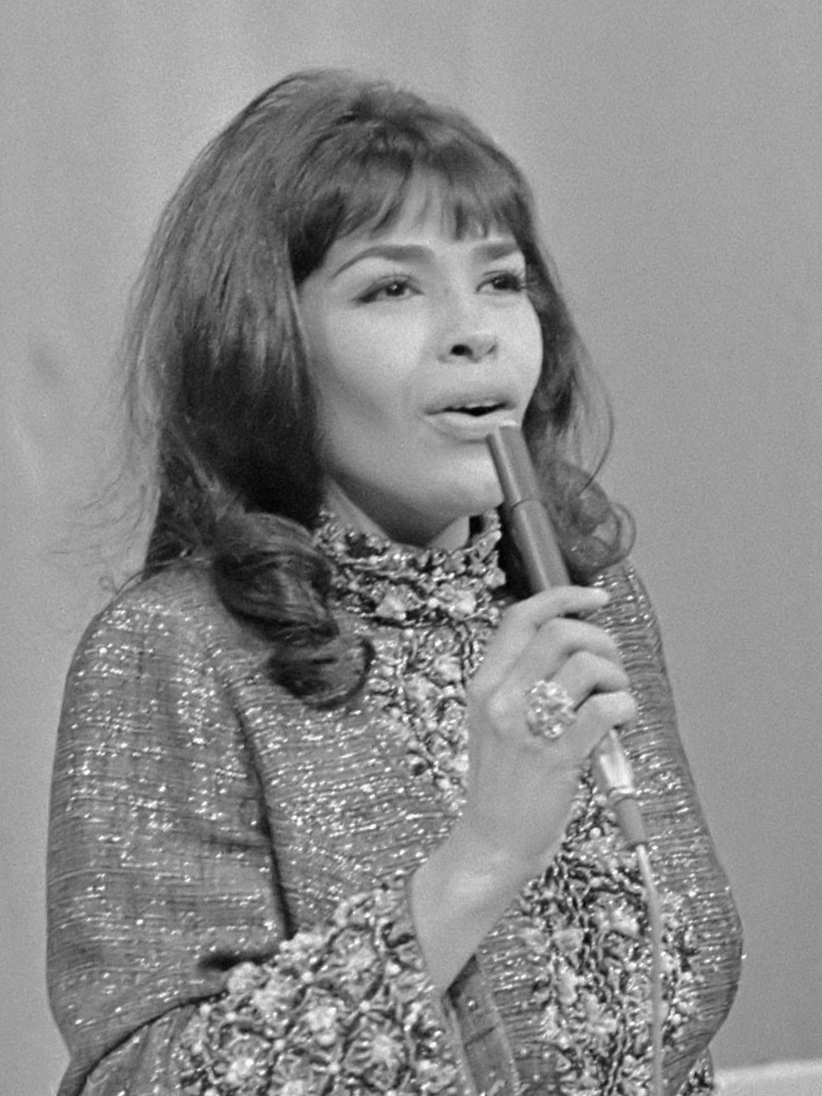
- Wilma Reading (1972)

Background information
- Occupation: musician

Wilma Reading is a singer from Cairns, Queensland, Australia.

Reading began her singing career in 1959 after singing for friends at a Brisbane jazz club.

Reading performed on The Tonight Show Starring Johnny Carson, had a residency at New York City's Copacabana nightclub and toured with Duke Ellington. Additionally, she made numerous appearances on The Morecambe & Wise Show in 1973 and 1974 and played Julie in a West End production of Show Boat, taking over from Cleo Laine. She has performed with the national orchestras of Belgium, the Netherlands, Iceland and Germany and toured with the Moscow Symphony Orchestra. She appeared alongside Jim Brown in the film Pacific Inferno. She has appeared in variety at The London Palladium and performed on BBC TV's, The Good Old Days.

Reading is of Australian Aboriginal, Torres Strait Islander, English, Irish, Jamaican, Afghan and Scottish ancestry. She is the niece of Heather Pitt (singer) and Georgia Lee.

In August 2019, Reading was inducted into the National Indigenous Music Awards Hall of Fame.

On 2 November 2019, Reading opened the Sydney International Women's Jazz Festival.

== Early life ==
Wilma was born in Cairns, Queensland, to an English-Irish father and a mother of Kalkatungu and Erub Islander heritage. Her family was involved in musical theatre and jazz, and would often sing together, artists like The Mills Brothers and Nat King Cole. In 1957, Wilma started performing with her sisters, Phronsie and Dulcie as The Reading Sisters. They performed together at family gatherings and birthday parties before entering the radio talent show Australia's Amateur Hour. In 1957, they won the state championship and travelled to Sydney for the finals, where they came in second place.

== Career ==
After the early success of The Reading Sisters, Wilma decided to leave music so she could focus more of her time on Softball. In 1959, her team went to Brisbane for a state competition. The group were out one evening when Wilma got up to sing for a teammate’s birthday.

"So I went up to the piano and did three songs, and after ten minutes or so, a gentleman came to our table, said he liked my singing and asked would I like a job with his band?"

Reading told him if he wanted her to perform he would need to apply to her parents for permission. Two weeks later a letter arrived from bandleader Lali Hegi, asking Wilma’s parents if the 17 year old could move to Brisbane and front his seventeen-piece band at the Ritz Ballroom. Her dad approved, but said she could only try for six months – if she was unable to make a living out of her music by that time she had to come back home. It was with this band that she learned to sing jazz – they performed the music of the Jazz legends of the time, Ella Fitzgerald, Sarah Vaughan and Frank Sinatra. She appeared a few nights a week and filled up the rest of the week performing show tunes at jazz clubs, as well performing with a trio at the Primitif Coffee Lounge.

In 1960, Reading moved to Sydney to pursue new career opportunities. She recorded ‘In My Little Corner of the World’ and ‘If I Were a Bell’ with Festival Records, and through this got the opportunity to become a regular on Brian Henderson's television variety show, Bandstand. Here she worked with the biggest Australian performers of the time: Col Joye, Dig Richards, the De Kroo Brothers, the Allen Brothers, Noeleen Batley and Judy Stone. During this period, Reading was offered a job overseas - a month-long residency at the Singapore's prestigious Goodwood Hotel. From a young age, Wilma had been determined to follow in the footsteps of her Aunt, legendary jazz singer Georgia Lee, and become a world-renowned performer.

"She went before me. I respect her very much because you consider, for an Indigenous girl from Cairns, Far North Queensland, population of perhaps five or eight thousand people at the time. There were absolutely no government grants at that time. She saved her money, probably by cleaning floors, washing, ironing… she became a singer. She became a star!"

Wilma took a huge risk and left Bandstand and Sydney network and moved to Singapore. Her residency was extended twice and developed into a series across Asia, which saw her visit Saigon (now Ho Chi Minh City), Bangkok, Tokyo, Hong Kong and Calcutta (now Kolkata). While in Manila, Wilma met her husband, Ray Lehr who would also become her manager.

One evening Wilma was performing at the Tokyo Hilton Hotel when she was spotted by an American talent agent who loved her show and offered her and her dancers the opportunity to tour America. They moved in 1964, and her first job was at The Riviera Hotel in Las Vegas.

“Las Vegas was hectic for me because it was nothing like what I had engaged with before… the whole way of life was turned around. We lived by night and slept by day. We had to do that because of the timetable. But it was great because we could meet other people – other artists.”

During this period, legendary pianist, singer and actor Liberace frequently came to see her show, and she met other stars of the day, including Tony Bennett, Louis Bellson, Dean Martin, Frank Sinatra, Dave Brubeck, and her idol Ella Fitzgerald. Off the back of her successful residency at The Riviera Hotel, Wilma was invited to audition for the great American jazz musician and bandleader, Duke Ellington; who composed popular songs ‘It Don’t Mean a Thing if it Ain’t Got That Swing’ and ‘Mood Indigo’.

“He sent me to Billy Strayhorn. So I’m at his place, he sits at the piano and I could have chosen one of the easier songs, ‘Satin Doll’, or ‘Don’t get around much anymore’. But I didn’t think of that. I auditioned with ‘Lush Life’. Three minutes passed and then he turned to me and said: “Thank you for singing the song the way I wrote it.”

She was hired immediately, and joined ‘The Duke’ and his orchestra on the road, appearing in Philadelphia and New York. Wilma is the only Australian to have performed on stage with Ellington. After just a few months of touring, however, she made the difficult decision to leave – she wanted to progress her career and felt she wasn't able to while remaining in Ellington's shadow.

In 1973, Reading left America for the United Kingdom. She recorded an LP, 'Wilma Reading' at EMI’s studios at Abbey Road. She also worked with composer John Barry to record the theme for The Tamarind Seed. During this period she also made regular guest appearances on over 30 British variety shows, including The Harry Secombe Show, The Ken Dodd Show, Stars on Sunday and the BBC sketch-comedy, The Morecambe & Wise Show. Wilma’s popular television appearances made her a star, enabling her to headline her own show across the United Kingdom.

At this time, Reading successfully auditioned to replace Cleo Laine in the role of Julie La Verne in Show Boat at the Adelphi Theatre in London’s West End.

“I just decided not to be scared and that’s that. After all, what did I have to lose? I went into the [musical] numbers my own way. I made no attempt to emulate Cleo’s very personal, individual style. Nobody could get away with that. I took it on the full throat without the mike and let the balcony bounce it back. I gave it my full range.”

In 1977, Wilma returned to New York for another season at the Copacabana nightclub. During this period, she took on another acting job, starring with Jim Brown in Pacific Inferno.

In 1979, she was seen by Russian diplomats while performing at London nightclub Talk of the Town. They were so impressed they invited her to tour with the Moscow Symphony Orchestra. At that time, Russia was still behind the Iron Curtain. Popular music was suppressed until recordings of The Beatles got through. Russia fell in love with popular music, and wanted to hear more jazz, blues and pop music from the west. Therefore in late 1978, ‘King of the Blues’ B.B. King and Elton John were invited to perform in Russia. Wilma Reading followed, and in 1979 was the third western artist invited to perform behind the Iron Curtain. She performed 33 shows throughout the Soviet Union in Moscow, Leningrad (now St. Petersburg) and Kiev.

In 1990, Reading performed at the reunification of East and West Germany in Berlin.

Despite her internationally successful career performing on the world stage, Wilma remained relatively unknown in Australia.

"The only problem is I was gone for so long because I built up my career overseas and would just come home to see my mum and dad and brothers and sisters. For me to get established in Australia I'd be leaving too much behind because it takes a while to get yourself established."

In 2003, she returned home to Cairns after the passing of her husband. She went on to teach singing at the local TAFE, passing on her vocal skills to future generations. During the 2010s, Wilma returned to the stage in a series of appearances at jazz festivals across the country. In August 2019, Wilma was inducted into the National Indigenous Music Awards Hall of Fame.

In 2008, Reading recorded album Now You See Me, about her life. She wrote the lyrics and music.

== Family ==
Reading is the niece of singer Georgia Lee.

== Select singles discography ==
- 1960: "In My Little Corner Of The World" / "If I Were A Bell" (Rex)
- 1960: "Nature Boy/Fool Fool Fool" (Rex)
- 1961: "I Only Came To Say Goodbye" / "That's How I Go For You" (Rex)
