= The Sheik of Scrubby Creek =

Studio album by Chad Morgan
- Released: 1958
- Recorded: 1952–1957
- Genre: Country
- Length: 23:51
- Label: Columbia

The Sheik of Scrubby Creek is the debut album of country singer Chad Morgan, released in 1958 through Columbia Records. The title refers to Morgan's well-known nickname. Two early tracks titled "I'm the Sheik of Scrubby Creek" and "You Can Have Your Women, I'll Stick to My Booze" were recorded by November 1952.

== Track listing ==
Side One

1. "I'm the Sheik of Scrubby Creek" – 2:23
2. "You Can Have Your Women, I'll Stick to My Booze" – 2:17
3. "The Bachelor's Warning" – 2:27
4. "The Shotgun Wedding" – 2:27
5. "The Duckinwilla Dance" – 2:38

Side Two

1. "The Answer to the Bachelor's Warning" – 2:26
2. "The Sheik Goes Courting" - 2:29
3. "The Dinkum Dill" – 2:11
4. "It's No Fun" - 2:19
5. "Chasing Sorts in Childers" - 2:20

== Personnel ==
- Chad Morgan - vocals, acoustic guitar
