= Black Allan Barker =

- Birth name: Allan Moarywaalla Barker
- Born: 12 April 1942
- Died: 5 December 2003 (aged 61) near Onslow, Western Australia
- Genres: country, blues
- Instrument(s): Vocals, Guitar
- Labels: Abmusic

Allan Moarywaalla Barker (12 April 1942 – 5 December 2003), known as Black Allan Barker, is a singer and songwriter from Port Hedland. He described his music as "Aboriginal grassroots blues" and is about Aboriginal oppression and rights. Barker was a co-founder (with Gordon Mutch) of Greenpeace Australia. Barker only recorded one album, 1983's Fire Burning (Abmusic) which is now rare to find. "Black Al" was well known for his performing in Sydney's Central Station tunnel in 1991 where he sang in language whilst his son Alan Jr accompanied him on didgeridoo. Barker spent some time in Nimbin during the 1990s and was involved with local Aboriginal youth in cultural and musical pursuits.

Barker sang both "Run Dingo Run" and "Take Me Back", in both the ABC documentary and accompanying cd, Buried Country: The Story of Aboriginal Country Music.
