= Roger Knox =

Australian country singer (born 1948)

- Born: 1948 (age 77–78); Moree, New South Wales; Australia
- Origin: Toomelah Aboriginal Mission
- Genre: Country music
- Occupation: Singer-songwriter
- Instrument: Vocals
- Years active: 1981–present
- Labels: Bloodshot Records (2013–present); Enrec Records

Roger Knox (born 1948) is an Australian country singer, nicknamed "the Black Elvis" and "Koori King of Country".

== Early life and education ==
Knox was born in 1948 in Moree, New South Wales. He is of the Gamilaroi nation, an Aboriginal Australian people. Knox grew up in the Toomelah Aboriginal Mission near Boggabilla, which is near the border between New South Wales and Queensland. Knox comes from a family with 11 children. His mother was a stolen child, who was taken from her parents as a baby and raised in a children's home in Bomaderry.

Knox was not allowed to attend the high school in Goondiwindi, but instead was sent by the mission to work without pay at one of their properties. Knox has said that the first music he heard growing up was gospel music, which his grandmother, who taught Sunday school, played.

== Career ==
Knox left the mission at 17 and moved to Tamworth, where he became a singer. He started out in the 1980s as a gospel singer. He acquired the nickname "The Black Elvis" (for his hairstyle and manner of dress) at the Star Maker talent contest when he was 31. He was also later dubbed "Koori King of Country".

In 2007, Knox went public with claims that he couldn't get booked at Tamworth's annual festival, Tamworth Country Music Festival, "because he attracted the wrong crowd".

=== Jon Langford and the Pine Valley Cosmonauts/Buried Country ===
On 12 February 2013, Knox along with the Pine Valley Cosmonauts, released his first album in nine years, Stranger in My Land on Bloodshot Records. The album was produced by Jon Langford and included guest contributions from Bonnie "Prince" Billy, Charlie Louvin, Dave Alvin (X, The Blasters), Kelly Hogan, Jon Langford, Andre Williams, the Sadies, Sally Timms (Mekons), and Tawny Newsome. The title of the record comes from a Vic Simms song. Jon Langford illustrated the booklet that accompanies the CD.

The material features covers of traditional and Aboriginal country songs. The record came about after Langford read about Knox in Australian author Clinton Walker's book, Buried Country, which chronicled Aboriginal country artists. When Langford visited Australia, he heard many of the recordings, then went to see Knox play at Tamworth's annual country music festival.

In 2009, Knox was scheduled to perform at the Old Town School of Folk Music (OTSFM) in Chicago, Illinois, on 10 October 2009 with Jon Langford and the Pine Valley Cosmonauts. However, his US visa was denied a week before the show because the US immigration office stated he lacked cultural significance. The Knox-Langford tour finally occurred in 2012, including performances at OTSFM and the Hardly Strictly Bluegrass festival in San Francisco, California.

In 2016, Knox joined the cast of the stage show adaptation of Buried Country itself, which played its premiere performance in Newcastle in August.

On 13 May 2026, the Knox family, including Roger, his son Buddy, and other family members, are scheduled to perform at the Sydney Opera House, as part of the "Generations and Dynasties" series. Buddy has played and performed with his father since he was 15

=== Musical style ===
Describing his music, Knox said in 2013: "My music is basically country with an influence of Aboriginal spirituality... I use all these (Aboriginal instruments such as didgeridoos) but I still play country music. I may not sing about trains and sheep and cattle, but I still play country music". It has been described as "frequently upbeat and the lyrics often sharply political in tone. The lyrics are sprinkled with references to kangaroos and pelicans and detail the struggles of Australia's Indigenous Aboriginal population".

== Honours and awards ==
In 1993, Knox was named NAIDOC Artist of The Year.

In 2004, he was inducted into the Australian Country Music Foundation's Country Music Hands of Fame.

In 2006, Knox was given the Jimmy Little Award for Lifetime Achievement in Aboriginal and Torres Strait Music at the 2006 Deadlys.

== Activism ==
Knox is well known in Australia and is loved for his regular tours of the New South Wales and Queensland prison systems, where many Aboriginal men and women are incarcerated. Knox has also performed at many Canadian prisons for Native American prisoners.

Knox participated in the Voices United for Harmony project, jointly managed by the Queensland Aboriginal and Islander Health Council and Griffith University.

== Personal life ==
=== Buddy Knox ===
Knox's son Buddy is also a musician, starting to play guitar at the age of 10. In 2006, he formed the Buddy Knox Blues Band, which won Best New Blues Talent at the Australian Blues Music CHAIN Awards at Goulburn in February 2009. He was a finalist for Male Artist of the Year in the 2009 DeadlyAward, and won numerous awards further awards. His debut album was got da blues (January 2008), which won the Newcastle Blues Awards Album of the Year.This was followed by Buddy's Blues in 2010, which comprises his own compositions as well as cover versions, including the National Musicoz Awards 2010 finalist "Squeaky Chair Blues". In 2011, he was nominated for a Deadlys award. He has toured with the Warumpi Band, Troy Cassar-Daley, Paul Kelly, and Kev Carmody.

Buddy married Sarina Andrew, daughter of famed Aboriginal country music singer Auriel Andrew, but they later divorced. Their sons, Gene, John, and Ruben, played in Buddy's band at some point.

=== Plane crashes ===
Knox survived two consecutive aircraft crashes. In 1981, early in his career, Knox joined the roadshow of Brian Young, who had a band that criss-crossed Australia by light plane, which crashed due to engine failure. The musicians and equipment had to be airlifted from the crash site. The plane carrying Knox, drummer Ken Ramsay, and singer Stephen Bunz from the scene also crashed. Ramsay was killed and the others were injured (including the pilot). Knox suffered third-degree burns over more than 90 percent of his body and became addicted to painkillers. One of his elders prescribed a traditional bush remedy in the form of a natural bath oil made from the Eura bush. That bush and the settlement on which his father was born were inspiration for the name of his band, the Euraba Band.

== Discography ==
=== Albums ===
Title	Details
Give It a Go	Released: 1984; Label: Enrec Records (ENL 001)
The Gospel Album	Released: 1986; Label: Enrec Records
Warrior in Chains – The Best of Roger Knox	Released: 1998; Label: Enrec Records
Goin' On, Still Strong	Released: 2004; Label: Trailblazer Records
Stranger in My Land (with The Pine Valley Cosmonauts)	Released: 2013; Label: Bloodshot Records

=== Singles ===
Title	Year
"Goulburn Jail"	1988
"Koala Bear"	1988

==== Other singles ====
List of singles as featured artist, with selected chart positions
Title	Year	Peak chart positions
Title	Year	AUS
"The Garden" (as "Australia Too")	1985	22

== See also ==
- List of Indigenous Australian musicians
- Bobby McLeod
