= Vic Simms =

Australian singer (1946–2025)

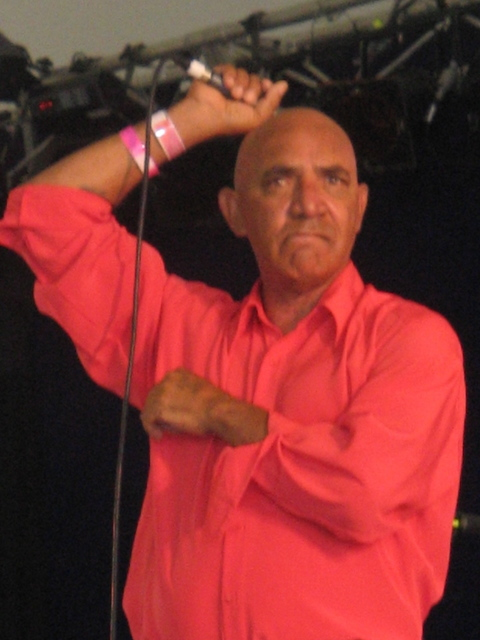
- Simms performing in 2007
- Born: William Victor Simms; 29 January 1946; La Perouse Mission, Sydney, Australia
- Died: 8 February 2025 (aged 79)
- Occupation: Singer
- Known for: The Loner (1972)

William Victor Simms (29 January 1946 – 8 February 2025), known as Vic Simms, Vicky Simms, and Uncle Vic, was an Aboriginal Australian singer. He is known for his 1973 album The Loner, which was recorded in prison and has been described as "Australia's great lost classic album of black protest music", and a "cult classic".

== Early life and education ==
William Victor Simms was born on 29 January 1946 on La Perouse Mission in the south-east Sydney suburb of La Perouse, one of 10 children. He was a Bidjigal man.

== Career ==
Simms was talent-spotted by Col Joye at the age of 11, and toured with the newly-renamed Col Joye and The Joy Boys, along with rising star Johnny O'Keefe. He performed aged 12 at the Manly Jazzorama Music Festival in 1957. His singing featured on TV commercials, then on music programs such as Bandstand and Six O'Clock Rock. In 1961, he released his debut single (as "Vicky Simms"), "Yo-Yo Heart", on Festival Records, aged 15.

After getting into alcohol and committing a robbery, he was sent to prison, While serving his sentence in Bathurst Gaol, he learnt how to play guitar and started writing songs.

In 1973, Simms' music was heard by a Robin Hood Foundation, who sent a tape to RCA. This album was recorded in one hour with a mobile studio in the prison dining room and was released in 1973 as The Loner. It has been described as "Australia's great lost classic album of black protest music", and a "cult classic". It is described at one of the first Indigenous protest albums. After the release of the album he was given special leave to perform at Sydney Opera House and shopping malls, and on tours of other prisons, as an example of a model prisoner. He was filmed by news crews giving prison concerts. This caused tensions among inmates, and, after being convinced he was being used by the Department of Corrections, he refused to play in prison concerts, leading to solitary confinement and moves to other prisons. By the time he was discharged in 1976, his album was forgotten.

After his release from prison, he reentered the entertainment industry. He toured Australian prisons and, in 1990, he toured Canada with Roger Knox and Bobby McLeod where they played in prisons and on reservations. Over the course of his career, he performed with Shirley Bassey and Robie Porter, among other prominent singers.

In 1996, he released a covers album titled From the Heart.

The masters of The Loner were lost, even to Simms. A friend tracked down a copy in Adelaide, costing him A$800, and he sent it as a Christmas gift to Simms.

=== Re-releases ===
In 2013, The Loner was re-released by Sandman records.

Selections From the Loner was released by Painted Ladies on 6 June 2014. After Brisbane-based musician Luke Peacock initiated the project songs from the original album were re-recorded by artists including Peacock, Paul Kelly, Ed Kuepper, Roger Knox, Bunna Lawrie, The Medics, Rusty Hopkinson, and Vic Simms himself.

== Other activities ==
Simms began teaching at the University of New South Wales in 2009.

Simms was a consultant on a feature-length movie project about Aboriginal warrior-leader Pemulwuy, working title Pemulwuy: The Movie, written by Jon Bell and directed by Catriona McKenzie. The filmmakers consulted Uncles Richard Green and Colin Isaacs, along with Simms, as local community elders. Philip Noyce, as executive producer, travelled from Los Angeles, along with McKenzie, in August 2019 to meet the elders, and production began in 2021.

== Recognition and honours ==
At the Deadly Awards 2001, Simms was awarded Outstanding Contribution to Aboriginal Music.

In 2009, The Loner was added to the National Film and Sound Archive's Sounds of Australia registry.

In 2024, he was awarded an honorary degree from the University of New South Wales.

== Death ==
Simms died on 8 February 2025, at the age of 79.

== Discography ==
=== Albums ===
List of albums, with selected details
Title	Details
The Loner	Released: 1973; Label: RCA; Format: LP
From the Heart	Released: 1996; Label: Bunyip; Format: CD

=== Extended plays ===
List of EPs, with selected details
Title	Details
Yo Yo Heart	Released: 1963; Label: Festival Records; Format: LP
