= Chad Morgan =

Australian musician (1933–2025)

Chad Morgan OAM
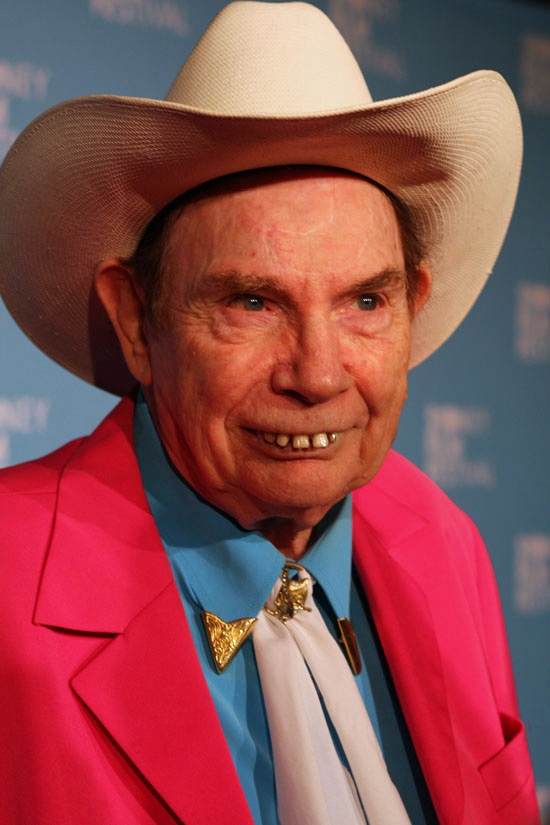
- Morgan in 2011
- Born: Chadwick William Morgan; 11 February 1933; Wondai, Queensland, Australia
- Died: 1 January 2025 (aged 91); Gin Gin, Queensland, Australia
- Other name: The Sheik of Scrubby Creek
- Occupations: Singer; guitarist
- Years active: 1952–2024
- Spouses: Pam Mitchell; Joanie
- Children: 3
- Musical career
- Genres: Country; folk; novelty
- Instruments: Vocals; guitar
- Label: EMI
- Website: chadmorgan.com.au

Chadwick William Morgan (11 February 1933 – 1 January 2025) was an Australian country music singer and guitarist known for his vaudeville style of comic country and western and folk songs, his prominent teeth and goofy stage persona. In reference to his first recording, he was nicknamed as "The Sheik of Scrubby Creek".

In February 2024, Morgan announced that he would retire following the final show of his Farewell to Australia. The final show was on 21 April 2024.

== Early life ==
Chadwick William Morgan was born on 11 February 1933 in Wondai, Queensland, as the eldest of 14 children, to Dave and Ivy Morgan. From an early age he was raised by his grandparents, Bill and Eva Hopkins. After his grandfather died in 1947, with his grandmother, he moved back to Scrubby Creek to live with his mother and siblings. Both parents were amateur musicians; his father played accordion and his mother accordion and mandolin, while Morgan learned guitar. He left school at age 14 and found work cutting timber.

According to Morgan, he made a dentist appointment to remove his protruding teeth. "I was tormented so much ... But the farm truck broke down." He later reflected that he was glad he never made another appointment.

== Career ==
From 1948, he worked on cattle farms near Rockhampton and began composing music. Morgan's lyrics use Australian slang including sheilas, drongos, dills and geezers. He was discovered through Australia's Amateur Hour, a radio talent contest, where he sang his original song "The Sheik of Scrubby Creek" and became a national finalist. By November 1952 he had recorded that track together with "You Can Keep Your Wimmln and I'll Stick to My Beer". He signed with Regal Zonophone Records (a subsidiary of EMI), which issued his debut single, "The Sheik of Scrubby Creek", in December. He was described as a "Queensland hillbilly" with a "deadpan, bumpkin style". He also undertook national service with the Royal Australian Air Force (RAAF) at Amberley Base.

Morgan toured extensively during his career, including with the Slim Dusty Show, the All Star Western Show and the Chad Morgan Show. He released 18 studio albums and undertook regular live performances. At the 1987 Country Music Awards of Australia he was inducted into the Australian Roll of Renown, and was awarded an Order of Australia (OAM]) on Australia Day (26 January) in 2004 for "service to country music". Morgan appeared in the films Newsfront (1978) and Dimboola (1979). In the former film he provided a cameo as "Redex singer". For the latter film he depicted Bayonet with "the full force of his unusual personality... [and] the lustre of his success in the entertainment world."

Morgan contributed one verse to the Gordon Parsons song "A Pub with No Beer". He was dubbed the "clown prince of comedy" by Slim Dusty. He recorded a duet with John Williamson, "A Country Balladeer". He had platinum and gold album sales, and is one of Australia's most popular country music artists. Morgan performed at Sydney Opera House with Slim Dusty in April 1978. An album of the concert was released three years later, as On & Off the Road. It was released the same year as Sheilas, Drongos, Dills & Other Geezers, which contained 20 of Morgan's hits from the 1950s and 1960s. In 2009 he wrote a song about his Aboriginal heritage dedicated to his grandparents who raised him as a child, "The Ballad of Bill and Eva". It was recorded with his granddaughter, Caitlin Morgan.

Artists who have impersonated Morgan in their shows include Col Elliott and John Williamson. Barry Humphries used Morgan as his inspiration for Les Patterson's teeth.

Tex Morton once described Morgan as the only original country music artist in Australia.

In January 2023, Morgan was touring rural Victoria, his career having spanned over 70 years.

== Personal life and death ==
Morgan was hospitalised for 14 months from December 1954 following a collision between his motorcycle and a car. His injuries included two broken ribs, broken hand and broken leg, which subsequently prevented doing "hard physical work, [so he] turned to singing." At age 47, the singer suffered a stroke.

He married fellow singer Pam Mitchell in 1957. The couple had three children, Chad Jr., Allan and Janelle. Morgan's second marriage was to Joanie, lasting from 1985 to 2017 (her death). He also admitted to being a heavy drinker and smoker. After their wedding, Morgan gave up drinking and smoking.

As of 2004, he had resided in Bli Bli, Queensland.

In 2008, false rumours of his death began to surface after an erroneous announcement on radio 4GY. The radio station later apologised for the rumour.

Morgan's biographical documentary film, I'm Not Dead Yet, was directed by Janine Hosking and released in 2011. The Australian writer Anna Rose published his biography, Chad Morgan − Seventy Years in the Making, in 2022.

Morgan died on 1 January 2025 at the age of 91.

== Awards and honours ==
=== Australian Roll of Renown ===
The Australian Roll of Renown honours Australian and New Zealander musicians who have shaped the music industry by making a significant and lasting contribution to country music. It was inaugurated in 1976 and the inductee is announced at the Country Music Awards of Australia in Tamworth each January.

Year	Nominee / work	Award	Result
1987	Chad Morgan	Australian Roll of Renown	Inductee

=== Country Music Awards of Australia ===
Morgan was given a Lifetime Achievement award at the 2010 CMAA Country Music Awards of Australia, as the first person to be honoured with this award.

Year	Nominee / work	Award	Result
2010	Chad Morgan	Lifetime Achievement Award	Awarded

A bronze bust of Morgan was unveiled in Tamworth's Bicentennial Park in 2017.

=== Mo Awards ===
The Australian Entertainment Mo Awards (known informally as the Mo Awards) were annual Australian entertainment industry awards. They recognised achievements in live entertainment in Australia from 1975 to 2016. Morgan won one award during that time.

Year	Nominee / work	Award	Result (wins only)
2015	Chad Morgan	Country Male Act of the Year	Won

=== Queensland Music Awards ===
The Queensland Music Awards (previously known as Q Song Awards) are annual awards celebrating Queensland, Australia's brightest emerging artists and established legends. They commenced in 2006.

Year	Nominee / work	Award	Result (wins only)
2018	himself	Grant McLennan Lifetime Achievement Award	Awarded

=== Tamworth Songwriters Awards ===
The Tamworth Songwriters Association (TSA) is an annual songwriting contest for original country songs, awarded in January at the Tamworth Country Music Festival. They commenced in 1986.

Year	Nominee / work	Award	Result (wins only)
2013	Chad Morgan	Songmaker Award	Awarded

== Discography ==
=== Studio albums ===
List of studio albums
Title	Details
The Sheik of Scrubby Creek	Released: 1958; Label: Columbia (33MS 7571)
The Chad Morgan Songbook	Released: 1962; Label: Columbia (33OSX 7662)
The Artistry of Chad Morgan	Released: 1967; Label: (OCLP 7660)
Cock of the Walk	Released: 1972; Label: Columbia (SOEX.9828)
Here I Am	Released: 1973; Label: Columbia (OSX-7751)
Sings John Ashe	Released: 1975; Label: Columbia (OEX-10216)
One of the Mob	Released: 1976; Label: Columbia (OEX-10319)
You Can't Keep a Good Man Down	Released: 1980; Label: Astor (ALPS 1060)
They Call Me the "Sheik"	Released: 1981; Label: Astor (ALPS 1067)
Chad Charms the Birds	Released: 1984; Label: EMI (EMX.430012)
Double Decker Blowflies	Released: 1987; Label: RCA Victor (VAL1 0690)
Don't Drink the Water (In the Outback Mate)	Released: 1990; Label: RCA Victor (SPLP 1190)
Been There, Done That (Gonna Do It Again)	Released: 1995; Label: Larrikin (LRF 391)
Muckin Round in Muckadilla	Released: Label: Chad Morgan
Songs My Old Mates Sang	Released: Label: Chad Morgan
Deadly	Released: Label: Chad Morgan
Family and Friends	Released: Label: Chad Morgan
Quarantined	Released: 2021; Label: Chad Morgan

=== Live albums ===
List of live albums
Title	Details
On and Off the Road	Released: 1982; Label: Axis (AX 1148)
Booze Ballads and Broads (with Terry Gordon)	Released: 1986; Label:
It's Only the Depth That Counts	Released: Label:
Live!	Released: 2011; Label: k-Tel

=== Compilation albums ===
List of compilation albums
Title	Details
The Best of Chad Morgan	Released: 1978; Label: EMI (EMB.10409)
Sheilas, Drongos, Dills and Other Geezers − 20 Chad Morgan Greats	Released: 1981; Label: EMI (PLAY.1006)
At His Sunday Best	Released: 1984; Label: J&B Records (JB172)
The Singles Collection − Regal Zonophone and Beyond	Released: 2001; Label: EMI (5416522)
Cop This Lot: 50 Years, 1952 – 2002	Released: 2002; Label:
Australian Country Classics	Released: 2011; Label: Master Classics
The Dues are Paid: 60 Years	Released: 2012; Label: Chad Morgan
Worst of Chad Morgan	Released: Label:
More Worst of Chad Morgan	Released: Label:
The A-Z of Chad Morgan − Volume 1	Released: October 2017; Label: Chad Morgan (3300300)
The A-Z of Chad Morgan − Volume 2	Released: October 2017; Label: Chad Morgan (3300301)
The A-Z of Chad Morgan − Volume 3	Released: October 2017; Label: Chad Morgan (3300302)

=== Extended plays ===
List of EPs
Title	Details
Thoughts on Marriage	Released: 1961; Label: Columbia (SEGO 70053)
Chad Morgan in Person	Released: 1962; Label: Columbia (SEGO 70060)
In a Cemetery	Released: 1967; Label: His Master's Voice (7EGO-70075)
