= Clinton Walker =

Australian writer

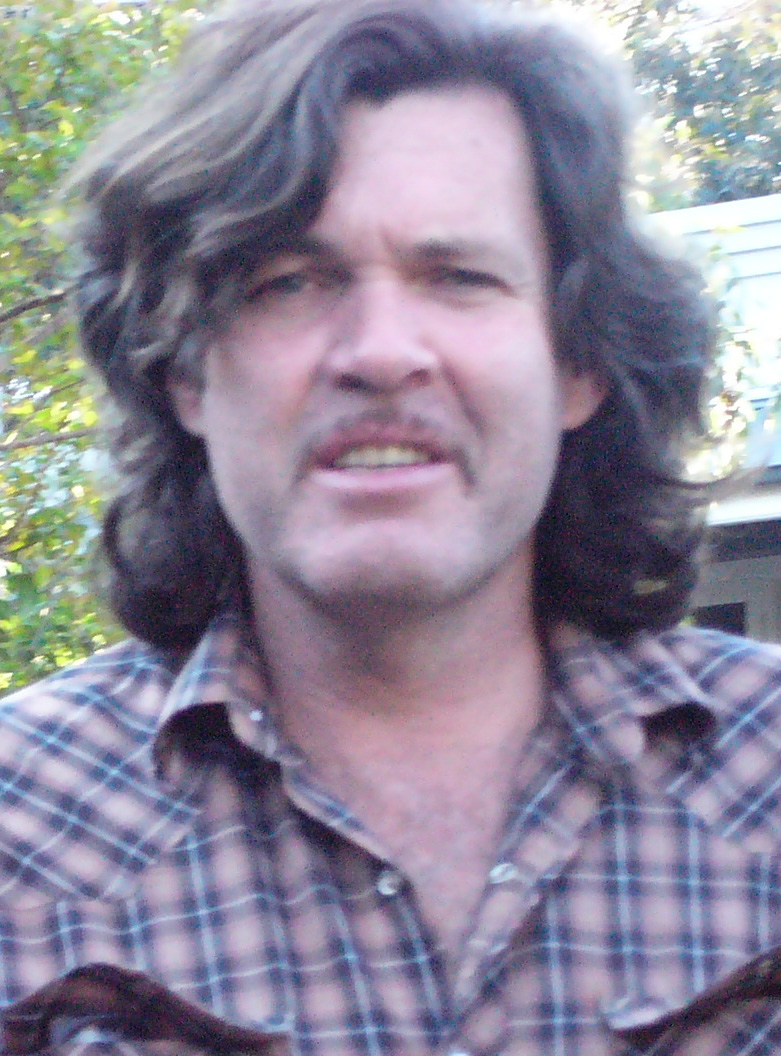
Walker in 2009

Clinton Walker is an Australian writer, best known for his works on popular music. He wrote the books Highway to Hell (1994; a biography of Bon Scott), Buried Country (2000), History is Made at Night (2012), and others. He has also written on other subjects, in books such as Football Life (1998) and Golden Miles (2005), and has worked as a journalist.

== Early life ==
Born in Bendigo, Victoria, in 1957, Walker dropped out of art school in Brisbane in the late 70s to start a punk fanzine with Andrew McMillan and to write for student newspapers.

== Career ==
In 1978, Walker moved to Melbourne, where he worked on-air for 3RRR, and with Bruce Milne on the fanzine Pulp and wrote for the fledgling Roadrunner magazine.

Moving on to Sydney in 1980, he commenced a career as a freelance journalist, and for many years he wrote for numerous magazines and newspapers, including RAM and Australian Rolling Stone, as well as The Bulletin, The Age, New Woman, Playboy, and Juice.

=== Books ===
Walker published his first book, Inner City Sound, in 1981. It documented the emergence of independent Australian punk/post-punk music and quickly fell out of print but was re-released in 2006 in an expanded, updated edition, along with an accompanying CD anthology.

In 1984, after a couple of years in London, Walker returned to Australia and published his second book, The Next Thing.

Walker's third book, Highway to Hell, was a biography of Bon Scott (1994).

Walker then published Stranded: The Secret History of Australian Independent Music 1977–1991 (1996) and Football Life (1998). Stranded was republished in 2021 by the Visible Spectrum in a new updated global edition. Des Cowley in his review in Rhythms Magazine said: "Reading Stranded today with a quarter-century’s hindsight, it’s easy to see that Walker mostly got things right. And if he stumbled now and again, it’s still the case he was streaks ahead of the pack." Football Life was similarly a personal history but covered minor-league Australian Rules culture.

Walker's sixth book, Buried Country, a history of Aboriginal country music, was published in 2000, along with an accompanying documentary film and CD soundtrack album. In his review, author Karl Neuenfeldt wrote, "the sheer scope of the book over diverse, distinct and dispersed Aboriginal communities and musicians means some things get more emphasis than others but overall it succeeds as social and musical history." A new updated edition of the book was released in 2015 along with a rebooted version of the CD called Buried Country 1.5, which received further critical praise. A live stageshow adaptation premiered in 2016 and toured for several years in the festival circuit. In 2018, Australian singer-songwriter Darren Hanlon, in conjunction with Mississippi Records in the US, produced a vinyl iteration of the Buried Country compilation that included new tracks.

In 2005, Walker’s seventh book, Golden Miles: Sex, Speed and the Australian Muscle Car, was published, expanding on an article he published in the Sydney Morning Herald in 2002. The Sydney Morning Herald praised the book's design and called Walker "our best chronicler of Australian grassroots culture". It was re-released in 2009 in an expanded and updated edition by Wakefield Press.

In 2012, Walker published History is Made at Night about the Australian live music circuit. In 2013 he published his ninth book, Wizard of Oz: Speed Modernism and the Last Ride of Wizard Smith, about the ill-starred Australian speed ace from the 1920s, Norman 'Wizard' Smith, as well as co-producing the CD Silver Roads, an anthology of Australian country-rock from the 1970s. Deadly Woman Blues, a graphic history of black women in Australian music, was released in 2018 by a division of academic publisher UNSW Press. Each of 99 biographical entries was accompanied by a hand-drawn illustration by Walker. The book immediately garnered a few glowing reviews. There was an angry backlash from four of the artists who expressed their displeasure at being included without being spoken to, and citing factual inaccuracies. This led to social media outrage in which Walker was criticized as a racist, misogynist, colonialist privileged white male. The book was withdrawn from sale, with the publisher promising to pulp any unsold copies and never to reprint it. Walker admitted to mistakes and apologised, saying "I didn't try to obscure what I was doing, I didn't take all the appropriate steps. I've been involved in underclass music forever, and in some ways, this is no different, but in other ways, it is very different".

In 2021, Walker released two books, including a new edition of Stranded and a new work, Suburban Songbook. Suburban Songbook: Writing Hits in post-war/pre-Countdown Australia is a critical history of the early evolution of rock/pop songwriting in Australia.

Walker's twelfth book The Soundtrack from Saturday Night Fever was published in 2023 as part of Bloomsbury's 33 1/3 series of short books on albums.

== Works ==
=== Bibliography ===
- Inner City Sound (Wild & Woolley, 1981; revised and expanded edition, Verse Chorus Press, 2005) ISBN 978-1-891241-18-5
- The Next Thing (Kangaroo Press, 1984) ISBN 978-0-949924-81-0
- Highway to Hell: The Life and Times of AC/DC Legend Bon Scott (Pan Macmillan, 1994; revised edition, Verse Chorus Press, 2001) ISBN 978-1-891241-86-4
- Stranded: The Secret History of Australian Independent Music 1977-1991 (Pan Macmillan, 1996/Visible Spectrum, 2021) ISBN 978-1-953835-08-6
- Football Life (PanMacmillan, 1998) ISBN 978-0-330-36081-4
- Buried Country (Pluto Press, 2000; revised and expanded edition Verse Chorus Press, 2015) ISBN 978-1-0880-0105-9
- Golden Miles (Lothian, 2005; expanded edition, Wakefield Press, 2009) ISBN 978-1-86254-854-1
- History is Made at Night (Currency House, 2012) ISBN 978-0-9872114-1-5
- Wizard of Oz: Speed Modernism and the Last Ride of Wizard Smith (Wakefield Press, 2013) ISBN 978-1-86254-950-0
- Deadly Woman Blues (New South, 2018/Withdrawn) ISBN 978-1-74223-566-0
- Suburban Songbook (Goldentone, 2021) ISBN 978-0-6450504-1-7
- Soundtrack from Saturday Night Fever (Bloomsbury/33.3) ISBN 979-8-7651-0967-0

=== Discography (as producer) ===
- Buried Country (Larrikin-Festival, 2000/Warner Music, 2015)
- Long Way to the Top (ABC, 2001)
- Studio 22 (ABC, 2002)
- Inner City Soundtrack (Laughing Outlaw, 2005)
- Silver Roads (Warner Music, 2013)

=== Videography (as writer) ===
- Notes from Home (ABC, 1987)
- Sing it in the Music (ABC, 1989)
- Studio 22 (ABC series, also as co-presenter, 1999–2003)
- Buried Country (Film Australia, 2000)
- Long Way to the Top (ABC, 2001)
- Love is in the Air (ABC, 2003)
- Rare Grooves (ABC series, also as presenter, 2003)
