= The Saints discography =

Cataloguing of published recordings by The Saints

- Studio albums: 15
- Extended plays: 6
- Live albums: 2
- Compilation albums: 10
- Singles: 17

The discography of Australian rock group The Saints consists of fifteen studio albums, seventeen singles, six EPs, two live albums and ten compilation albums. The Saints began in 1974 as punk rockers and released their first single, "(I'm) Stranded", in September 1976 on their own Fatal Records label. They were signed to EMI and released their debut album in February 1977, (I'm) Stranded. Mainstay founder Chris Bailey is the principal songwriter and record producer. Their sound became more R&B and pop rock. Their highest-charting album, All Fools Day peaked in the Top 30 on the Australian Kent Music Report Albums Chart in April 1986. Their cover version of The Easybeats' hit "The Music Goes Round My Head", issued in November 1988, peaked in the Top 40 on the ARIA Singles Chart.

In May 2001, Australasian Performing Right Association (APRA) celebrated its 75th anniversary and named "(I'm) Stranded" in its Top 30 Australian songs of all time. The band was inducted into the Australian Recording Industry Association (ARIA) Hall of Fame in September. In 2007, "I'm Stranded" was one of the first 20 songs stored on the National Film and Sound Archive's Sounds of Australia registry. Their debut album, (I'm) Stranded, was listed at No. 20 in the book 100 Best Australian Albums in October 2010. Their third album, Prehistoric Sounds, also appeared in the list, at No. 41.

== Studio albums ==
Year	Title	Chart peak positions
Year	Title	AUS
1977	(I'm) Stranded: Released: 21 February 1977; Label: EMI, Harvest Records, Sire Records; Producer: Mark Moffatt, Rod Coe	—
1978	Eternally Yours: Released: May 1978; Label: Harvest Records, Fan Club, Sire Records; Producer: Chris Bailey, Ed Kuepper	86
1978	Prehistoric Sounds: Released: October 1978; Label: Harvest Records, Fan Club.; Producer: Bailey, Kuepper	—
1981	The Monkey Puzzle: Released: February 1981; Label: Lost Records, New Rose Records; Producer: Bailey, Gerry Nixon	85
1982	Casablanca (aka Out in the Jungle... Where Things Ain't So Pleasant): Released: March 1982; Label: Lost Records, New Rose Records; Producer: Ricardo Mentalban (aka Chris Bailey)	—
1984	A Little Madness to Be Free: Released: July 1984; Label: Lost, RCA; Producer: Lurax Debris (aka Chris Bailey)	—
1986	All Fools Day: Released: April 1986; Label: Mushroom Records; Producer: Bailey, Hugh Jones	29
1988	Prodigal Son: Released: April 1988; Label: Mushroom; Producer: Bailey	50
1996	Howling: Released: October 1996; Label: Blue Rose Records; Producer: Bailey, Michelle Barry, Lelle Hilderbrand, Joakim Täck	—
1998	Everybody Knows the Monkey: Released: May 1998; Label: Last Call Records; Producer: Bailey, Martin Hennel	—
2000	Spit the Blues Out: Released: 2000; Label: Last Call Records; Producer: Debris (aka Bailey), Brendan Bailey	—
2005	Nothing Is Straight in My House: Released: March 2005; Label: Cadiz; Producer: Bailey, Chris Carr, Richard England	—
2006	Imperious Delirium: Released: 2006; Label: Cadiz; Producer: Bailey	—
2012	King of the Sun: Released: 2012; Label: Highway 125; Producer: Fortunato Luchresi	—
2025	Long March Through the Jazz Age: Released: 2025; Label: Fire Records; Producer: Chris Carr, Elisabet Corlin	—
"—" denotes releases that did not chart or were not released in that country.

== Live albums ==
Year	Title
1985	Live in a Mud Hut ... Somewhere in Europe: Released: 1985; Label: Rose Records; Producer: Mugumbo (aka Chris Bailey)
1995	The Most Primitive Band in the World (Live from the Twilight Zone, Brisbane 1974): Released: 1995; Label: Hot Records; Producer: Bailey, Don Bartley
2026	Live At Club '76: Released: 20 November 2026; Label:

== Compilation albums ==
Year	Title	Chart peak positions
Year	Title	AUS
1986	Best of the Saints: Released: 1986; Label: Razor Records; Producer:	—
1989	Scarce Saints: Hymns of Oblivion 1977–1981: Released: 1989; Label: Harvest Records, Raven Records; Producer:	—
1989	The New Rose Years: Released: 1989; Label: New Rose Records; Producer:	—
1990	Songs of Salvation and Sin 1976–1988: Released: 1990; Label: Raven Records; Producer:	—
1991	Permanent Revolution: Released: 1991; Label: Mushroom Records; Producer:	—
1996	Know Your Product: The Best of The Saints: Released: 1996; Label: Harvest Records; Producer:	—
1999	7799: Big Hits on the Underground: Released: 1999; Label: Last Call Records; Producer:	—
2000	Wild About You 1976–1978: Released: April 1988; Label: Mushroom; Producer: Bailey	50
2004	All Times Through Paradise: Released: 16 August 2004; Label: EMI; Producer:	—
2006	The Greatest Cowboy Movie Never Made: Released: 13 November 2006; Label: Cadiz Music; Producer:	—

== Extended plays ==
Year	Title
1977	New Wave: Released: August 1977; Label: Power Exchange Records; Producer: Mark Moffatt; Note: A split EP with B-side by The Saints, A-side by Stanley Frank
1977	One Two Three Four: Released: September 1977; Label: Harvest Records, EMI; Producer: Chris Bailey, Ed Kuepper
1979	Paralytic Tonight, Dublin Tomorrow: Released: October 1979; Label: Lost Records (EMI); Producer: L. Lambert (aka Chris Bailey)
1985	The Saints: Released: 1985; Label: RCA Victor; Producer:
1986	See You in Paradise: Released: 1986; Label: Mushroom Records
1993	Cheap Erotica: Released: 1993

== Singles ==
Year	Title	Peak chart positions			Album
Year	Title	AUS	UK	US Alt.	Album
1976	"(I'm) Stranded"	98	—	—	(I'm) Stranded
1977	"Erotic Neurotic"	—	—	—	(I'm) Stranded
1977	"This Perfect Day"	—	34	—	Eternally Yours
1977	"Lipstick on Your Collar"	—	—	—	One Two Three Four
1978	"Know Your Product"	—	—	—	Eternally Yours
1978	"Security"	—	—	—	Prehistoric Sounds
1980	"Always"	—	—	—	The Monkey Puzzle
1981	"Let's Pretend"	—	—	—	The Monkey Puzzle
1982	"Follow the Leader"	—	—	—	I Thought This Was Love, But This Ain't Casablanca
1984	"Grain of Sand"	—	—	—	Non-album single
1984	"Ghost Ships"	46	—	—	A Little Madness to Be Free
1984	"Imagination"	—	—	—	A Little Madness to Be Free
1986	"Just Like Fire Would"	29	—	—	All Fools Day
1986	"(You Can't Tamper with the) Temple of the Lord"	85	—	—	All Fools Day
1986	"See You in Paradise"	—	—	—	All Fools Day
1988	"Grain of Sand"	81	—	11	Prodigal Son
1988	"Stay"	—	—	—	Prodigal Son
1988	"The Music Goes 'Round My Head"	39	—	19	Young Einstein
"—" denotes a recording that did not chart or was not released in that territory.
