= All Times Through Paradise =

Box set by The Saints
- Released: 2004
- Recorded: 1977–1978
- Label: EMI
- Producer: Vicky Vogiatzoglou (box set Coordinator), Mark Moffatt and Rod Coe ((I'm) Stranded), Chris Bailey & Ed Kuepper (Eternally Yours and Prehistoric Sounds)

The Saints chronology
Spit the Blues Out (2000)	All Times Through Paradise (2004)	Nothing Is Straight in My House (2005)

Professional ratings
Review scores
Source	Rating
BBC Music	positive
Mojo	positive

All Times Through Paradise is a box set compilation comprising the Saints' albums, singles released between 1977 and 1978, their EP One Two Three Four and unreleased 1977 performances from Paddington Town Hall, Sydney and The Hope and Anchor, London (titled Live In London 26/11/77). The discs were later released separately in 2007, except for Live In London 26/11/77 which remained exclusive to this set.

== Track listing ==
=== Disc 1: (I'm) Stranded, out-takes and non album tracks ===
All tracks are written by Chris Bailey and Ed Kuepper except where shown.

(I'm) Stranded (1977)
No.	Title	Writer(s)	Length
1.	"(I'm) Stranded"		3:33
2.	"One Way Street"		2:56
3.	"Wild About You"	Andy James	2:36
4.	"Messin' with the Kid"		5:55
5.	"Erotic Neurotic"		4:07
6.	"No Time"		2:48
7.	"Kissin' Cousins"	Fred Wise, Randy Starr	2:00
8.	"Story of Love"	Kuepper	3:12
9.	"Demolition Girl"	Kuepper	1:42
10.	"Nights in Venice"	Kuepper	5:41

Bonus tracks
No.	Title	Writer(s)	Length
11.	"Untitled" (out-take)		2:56
12.	"This Perfect Day" (single version)		2:12
13.	"Lies" (B-side to "This Perfect Day")		2:05
14.	"Do the Robot" (B-side to "This Perfect Day" 12" single)	Kuepper	2:44
15.	"Lipstick on Your Collar" (One Two Three Four EP)	Goehring, Lewis	2:35
16.	"One Way Street" (One Two Three Four EP)		2:52
17.	"Demolition Girl" (One Two Three Four EP)	Kuepper	1:59
18.	"River Deep – Mountain High" (One Two Three Four EP)	Spector, Barry, Greenwich	3:53
Total length:			55:51

=== Disc 2: Eternally Yours and The International Robot Sessions ===
Eternally Yours (1978)
No.	Title	Writer(s)	Length
1.	"Know Your Product"		3:15
2.	"Lost and Found"		3:50
3.	"Memories Are Made of This"	Kuepper	2:20
4.	"Private Affair"		2:05
5.	"A Minor Aversion"		3:07
6.	"No, Your Product"		4:07
7.	"This Perfect Day"		2:30
8.	"Run Down"		2:32
9.	"Orstralia"	Kuepper	2:24
10.	"New Centre of the Universe"		2:21
11.	"Untitled"		2:47
12.	"(I'm) Misunderstood"		2:46
13.	"International Robots"		1:58

The International Robot Sessions
No.	Title	Writer(s)	Length
14.	"Orstralia"	Kuepper
15.	"Lost and Found"
16.	"The Ballad" (an early version of "Memories Are Made of This")"	Kuepper
17.	"This Perfect Day"
18.	"Run Down"
19.	"A Minor Aversion"
20.	"Champagne Misery"
21.	"Private Affair"
22.	"No, Your Product"
23.	"New Centre of the Universe"
24.	"River Deep Mountain High"
25.	"Untitled"
26.	"(I'm) Misunderstood"
27.	"D the Robot"

=== Disc 3: Prehistoric Sounds, out-take and Live at Paddington Town Hall, Sydney 21 April 1977 ===
Prehistoric Sounds (1978)
No.	Title	Writer(s)	Length
1.	"Swing for the Crime"		3:41
2.	"All Times Through Paradise"		4:08
3.	"Everyday's a Holiday, Every Night's a Party"		2:48
4.	"Brisbane (Security City)"	Kuepper	4:22
5.	"Church of Indifference"	Kuepper	5:05
6.	"Crazy Googenheimer Blues"		2:32
7.	"Everything's Fine"	Kuepper	2:37
8.	"The Prisoner"		5:00
9.	"Security"	Otis Redding	2:22
10.	"This Time"		3:15
11.	"Take This Heart of Mine"	Chris Bailey	2:28
12.	"Chameleon"		5:16
13.	"Save Me"	Aretha Franklin, Carolyn Franklin, Curtis Ousley	3:34

Out-take
No.	Title	Length
14.	"Looking for the Sun" (studio outtake from Prehistoric Sounds)

Live at Paddington Town Hall, Sydney 21 April 1977
No.	Title	Length
15.	"Intermission"
16.	"This Perfect Day"
17.	"Run Down"
18.	"Erotic Neurotic"
19.	"Demolition Girl"
20.	"Nights in Venice"

=== Disc 4: Live In London 26/11/77 ===
No.	Title	Writer(s)	Length
1.	"Introduction"
2.	"Do The Robot"	Kuepper
3.	"Lost And Found"
4.	"Lipstick On Your Collar"	Edna Lewis, George Goehring
5.	"River Deep Mountain High"	Ellie Greenwich, Jeff Barry, Phil Spector
6.	"Untitled"
7.	"Run Down"
8.	"This Perfect Day"
9.	"Messin' With The Kid"
10.	"Orstralia"	Ed Kuepper
11.	"Night In Venice"
12.	"(I'm) Stranded"
13.	"Demolition Man"	Ed Kuepper
14.	"One Way Street"
