= King of the Sun =

Studio album by The Saints
- Released: 2012
- Recorded: Trackdown Studios. Sydney, Australia.
- Genre: Punk blues; pop punk
- Label: Highway 125 (Australia); Fire (UK; released with King of the Midnight Sun)
- Producer: Fortunato Luchresi

The Saints chronology
Imperious Delirium (2006)	King of the Sun (2012)	Long March Through the Jazz Age (2025)

King of the Sun is the fourteenth studio album released by Australian rock music group The Saints. Recorded in Sydney, Australia, the album is a concept album based on a journey home after a hundred-year war. It was the final studio album released by the band in Chris Bailey's lifetime, who would die a decade later in 2022.

== Critical reception ==
Professional ratings
Review scores
Source	Rating
The Music	positive
Faster Louder	positive
100% Rock Magazine	8/10 stars
Beat Magazine	positive

The album was met with mostly positive reviews from the Australian music press. Patrick Emery from Beat Magazine noted: "With only minor exception, it’s Bailey in his finest whimsical folk-blues guise. The title track has a whiff of literary pretension, its lyrics a set of seemingly non-sequitur statements built around a simple melody and Bailey’s disaffected vocals. Sweet Chariot is arguably the classic contemporary Saints style – a lumbering blues-based pop lick and an aesthetic that sits perfectly with Bailey’s modern day Lord Byron persona. Million Miles Away (La De Bloody Da) would, if attended to in a brutal punk manner, be one of the great garage rock tracks; here, it’s an intriguing acoustic track of surprising depth. "

== Track listing ==
1. "King of the Sun"
2. "A Million Miles Away"
3. "Sweet Chariot"
4. "Turn"
5. "Mystified"
6. "Duty"
7. "Road to Oblivion Part 2"
8. "Craters on the Moon"
9. "Mini Mantra Part 1"
10. "Adventures in the Dark Arts of Watermelonery"

=== Bonus Disc "Songs from the Stash" ===
Also included in the 2012 CD release was a bonus disc called Songs from the Stash. These featured nine songs from the post Ed Kuepper period.

1. "Just Like Fire Would" (from All Fools Day)
2. "Last and Laughing Mile" (from Howling)
3. "Massacre" (from Prodigal Son)
4. "Photograph" (from A Little Madness to Be Free)
5. "Ghost Ships" (from A Little Madness to Be Free and Prodigal Son)
6. "Shipwreck" (from Prodigal Son)
7. "Fall of an Empire" (from Everybody Knows the Monkey)
8. "Something Wicked" (from Howling)
9. "All Fools Day" (from All Fools Day)

=== King of the Midnight Sun ===
In 2014, the album was issued in some territories as a double; the second disc is the same track listing, but all songs have been re-recorded with guitarist Barrington Francis and drummer Peter Wilkinson, who did not appear on the original record. Wilkinson beats the drums hard while Barrington Francis plays with a lot of distortion which gives the second disc a very different feel.

== Personnel ==
- Chris Bailey – vocals, guitar, bass
- Sean Carey – guitar, sound engineering
- Geoff Watson – drums
- Danny Carmichael – trombone
- Simon Ferenci – trumpet
- John Glase – harmonica
- Any Judd – keyboards, piano
- Amelia Rutherford – cello
- Fortunato Luchresi – producer
