= Know Your Product =

Single by The Saints

from the album Eternally Yours
- Released: February 1978
- Recorded: Roundhouse and Wessex Studios, London, May 1977
- Genre: Punk rock
- Length: 3:14
- Label: EMI 11673 (Australia); Harvest 5148 (UK)
- Songwriters: Ed Kuepper and Chris Bailey
- Producers: Ed Kuepper, Chris Bailey

The Saints singles chronology
"This Perfect Day" (1977)	"Know Your Product" (1978)	"Security" (1978)

"Know Your Product" is a song by Australian rock band The Saints. Written by Ed Kuepper and Chris Bailey, the song was released in February 1978 as the second single from the group's second album, Eternally Yours. Noted for its unusual mix of prominent brass with a punk rock guitar sound, the track has been described as a "pile-driving surge of raw soul power and one of the greatest singles from the punk rock period."

== Production and release ==
A transitional record for The Saints, "Know Your Product" developed the aggressive punk sound of their debut single, "(I'm) Stranded" (1976), while anticipating the horn-driven R&B of their next album, Prehistoric Sounds (1978). Regarding its musical influences, singer Chris Bailey later said, "Thank Sam and Dave for the brass section! And Stax's horns." Lyrically the song was a cynical take on consumerism; in a 2004 interview, guitarist Ed Kuepper agreed that it was "like a distant cousin to '(I Can't Get No) Satisfaction'."

A video of the band performing "Know Your Product" was released, shot entirely in solarised colour. The single did not chart, however. Referring to one of the leading mainstream DJs on BBC Radio 1, Bailey noted "Tony Blackburn didn't like it, which was the biggest compliment you could have at the time." The B-side, "Run Down", also appeared on Eternally Yours; in place of the A-side's horns it employed harmonica to augment the band's regular guitar, bass and drum sound. Another track on the album was punningly titled "No, Your Product".

== Reception ==
The Guardian opined that making this the opening track on Eternally Yours "confused pretty much everyone: what the hell was a brass section doing on a punk record? The punchy horns are the perfect counterpart to Bailey's drawled vocals and Kuepper's buzzsaw guitar." While noting that the song was doomed to make little impact in the charts, it was described as "one of the greatest Australian singles ever made."

== Other uses ==
Know Your Product was used as the title of a 1996 compilation of The Saints' punk-era music. Hunters and Collectors covered the song in 1994, while Midnight Oil recorded a live version in the late 1990s. It appeared on the soundtrack of the film Head On in 1998. Other bands to cover the song include Painters and Dockers, the Porkers, Blowhard, and King Khan and the Shrines. The Australian Broadcasting Corporation show Spicks and Specks uses the name of the song in a segment of the show. Kurt Cobain listed it in his top fifty recordings of all time.

== Track listing ==
Both songs written by Ed Kuepper and Chris Bailey

1. "Know Your Product" – 3:14
2. "Run Down" – 2:31

== Personnel ==
- Chris Bailey – vocals
- Ed Kuepper – guitar
- Ivor Hay – drums
- Algy Ward – bass
- Graham Preskett – brass arrangements ("Know Your Product")
- Iain Ward – harmonica ("Run Down")
