= Janine Hall =

- Birth name: Janine Margaret Hall
- Born: 1952 or 1953; New Zealand
- Origin: Sydney, Australia
- Died: 20 May 2008 (aged 55); Melbourne, Victoria, Australia
- Occupation(s): Musician, naturopath
- Instrument(s): Bass guitar, vocals
- Years active: 1977–1992
- Formerly of: Young Charlatans; the Saints; the Teddies; Skolars; Wolfgang; James Griffin and the Subterraneans; Weddings Parties Anything; Kings of the World; the Lost Weekend; Red Dress

Janine Margaret Hall (1952 or 1953 – 20 May 2008) was a New Zealand-born musician who played in early proto punk, punk rock and rock groups in Australia. On bass guitar she was a member of Rowland S. Howard's Young Charlatans (1977–1978), the Saints (1979–1982, 1984–1985) and Weddings Parties Anything (1986–1987). After her music career she practised as a naturopath.

== Biography ==
Janine Margaret Hall was born in 1952 or 1953 in New Zealand. After moving to Australia, Hall became an part of the emerging Australian punk music scene. In December 1977 Young Charlatans needed a bass player. Ollie Olsen (guitar, vocals), Rowland S. Howard (guitar) and Jeffrey Wegener (drums) had travelled from Melbourne to Sydney to rehearse; after Hall sat in she joined as their bass guitarist. The band returned to Melbourne in January 1978, but before they could release any music, they broke up in May.

In 1979, Hall joined a reformed version of Australian punk group the Saints in England alongside founding mainstay Chris Bailey on lead vocals, Mark Birmingham on drums, Bruce Callaway on guitar and Barry Francis on guitar, releasing their music on the punk rock record label, New Rose Records. She replaced the previous Saints bassist, Algy Ward, who had left to play with British punk rock band, the Damned and to work with Lemmy and Fast Eddie Clarke of Motörhead. After recording their extended play Paralytic Tonight, Dublin Tomorrow (March 1980), she returned to Australia. There, she recorded on the band's follow up album The Monkey Puzzle (February 1981) and continued performing with the Saints until 1985.

She was an original member of the short-lived Wolfgang (a.k.a. Wolf Gang), with Mick Medew and Michael Charles, which formed 1983 and performed alongside Medew's other band the Screaming Tribesmen. The band played songs Medew had written for his other band, and their own debut single "Shadow in the Hall" was intended for release in March 1984 by Citidel Records. During this period, Hall took a break from touring with the Saints.

Hall had joined Weddings Parties Anything (WPA) in 1986 on bass and vocals; she was recorded on their debut album, The Scorn of the Women. She left in August 1987 as the band were in the process of recording their next album, and joined King of the World. From the early 1990s Hall worked in naturopathy. She died on 20 May 2008, aged 55, in Melbourne. In 2012 Hall was inducted into the EG Hall of Fame at The Age 2012 EG Music Awards. Together with former WPA band mate Jen Anderson, Hall was one of the first two women in that Hall of Fame.
