= New Wave =

New Wave may refer to:

== Cinema and music ==
- New Wave (movement), various artistic movements in film and music
  - French New Wave, a French art film movement which emerged in the late 1950s
  - Japanese New Wave, a group of loosely-connected Japanese filmmakers during the late 1950s and into the 1970s
  - New wave music, a broad pop/rock genre that originated in the 1970s
  - New wave of British heavy metal, originating in the late 1970s
  - New wave of American heavy metal, originating in the 1990s

== Albums ==
- New Wave (Against Me! album) or the title song, 2007
- New Wave (The Auteurs album), 1993
- New Wave (Dizzy Gillespie album), 1962
- New Wave (Powerman 5000 album), 2017
- New Wave (compilation album), a new wave/punk compilation album, 1977
- New Wave (EP), a 2022 EP by Cravity
- New Wave, an extended play by The Saints, 1977
- newWAVE, a 2018 album by Dat Adam
- New Waves, a 2017 album by Bone Thugs

== Songs ==
- "New Wave", a song by Black Eyed Peas from Masters of the Sun Vol. 1, 2018
- "New Wave", a song by Brookes Brothers, 2018
- "New Wave", a song by the Parkinsons, 2004
- "New Wave", a song by Sam Gellaitry, 2022
- "New Wave Song", a song by Turbonegro from Hot Cars and Spent Contraceptives, 1992
- "The New Wave", a 1994 single by Daft Punk later included on their debut album Homework as "Alive"

== Other ==
- New Wave (South Korean political party), a political party in South Korea
- New Wave (Polish political party), a political party in Poland
- New Wave science fiction, a movement in science fiction
- New Wave (DC Comics), a character from DC Comics
- New Wave (manga), a movement in manga
- New Wave (design), a typographical design philosophy
- NewWave, a software product released by Hewlett-Packard circa 1988
- The New Wave (comics), a 1986 comic book by Eclipse Comics
- New Wave (competition), an annual international competition of young singers of popular music
- New Wave Kitakyushu, a Japanese football (soccer) club
- A New Wave, a 2006 American film

== See also ==
- New Age (disambiguation)
- Nouvelle Vague (disambiguation)
- Nueva ola
