= The Greatest Cowboy Movie Never Made =

Box set by the Saints
- Released: 13 November 2006
- Label: Cadiz Music
- Producer: L. Lambert, Chris Bailey & Lurax Debris

The Saints chronology
Nothing Is Straight in My House (2005)	The Greatest Cowboy Movie Never Made (2006)	Imperious Delirium (2006)

Professional ratings
Review scores
Source	Rating
Allmusic	4/5 stars

The Greatest Cowboy Movie Never Made is a box set compilation comprising The Saints' albums released between 1981 and 1984, their EP Paralytic Tonight, Dublin Tomorrow and an unreleased live disc titled A Gallon of Rum Is a Harsh Mistress the Morning After. Live in Oz. The concert was recorded in Sydney, Australia, 1981.

== Track listing ==
=== Disc 1: Paralytic Tonight, Dublin Tomorrow & The Monkey Puzzle ===
Tracks 1 - 5 from the EP Paralytic Tonight, Dublin Tomorrow
Tracks 6 - 16 from the album The Monkey Puzzle

1. "Simple Love"
2. "(Don't send me) Roses"
3. "Miss Wonderful"
4. "On the Waterfront"
5. "Call it Mine"
6. "Miss Wonderful"
7. "Always, Always"
8. "Paradise"
9. "Let’s Pretend"
10. "Somebody".
11. "Monkeys"
12. "Mystery Dream"
13. "In The Mirror"
14. "Simple Love"
15. "The Ballad"
16. "Dizzy Miss Lizzy"

=== Disc 2: Out in the Jungle (aka. I Thought This Was Love, But This Ain't Casablanca) ===
1. "Follow the Leader"
2. "Rescue"
3. "Senile Dementia"
4. "Casablanca"
5. "Curtains"
6. "Come On"
7. "1000 Faces"
8. "Animal"
9. "Out in the Jungle"
10. "Beginning of the Tomato Party"
11. "Out of Sight Out of Mind"
12. "Simple Love"
13. "Dizzy Miss Lizzy" (bonus track)
14. "Gypsy Woman" (bonus track)
15. "Call It Mine" (bonus track)
16. "Don't Send Me Roses" (bonus track)

=== Disc 3: A Little Madness to Be Free (international version) ===
1. "Down the Drain"
2. "Walk Away"
3. "Photograph"
4. "The Hour"
5. "Angels"
6. "Imagination"
7. "Only Time"
8. "Someone to Tell Me"
9. "Heavy Metal"
10. "Ghost Ships"
11. "Wrapped Up and Blue" (bonus track from the Australian release)

=== Disc 4: A Gallon of Rum Is a Harsh Mistress the Morning After—Live in Oz ===
1. "Miss Wonderful"
2. "Mystery Dream"
3. "Always Always"
4. "This Perfect Day"
5. "The Prisoner"
6. "Gypsy Woman"
7. "On the Waterfront"
8. "Messin' with the Kid"
9. "Call It Mine"
10. "No Time"
11. "Dizzy Miss Lizzy"
12. "Lipstick on Your Collar"
13. "Simple Love"
14. "Know Your Product"
