= Working Overtime =

Working Overtime may refer to:

- Overtime, time worked beyond normal working hours, or the pay received for such work
- "Workin' Overtime" (Roseanne), a 1989 television episode

== Music ==
- Workin' Overtime, a 1989 album by Diana Ross, or the title song
- Workin' Overtime, a 2001 album by Adam Harvey
- "Working Overtime", a song by New Order from Waiting for the Sirens' Call, 2005
- "Working Overtime", a song by the Saints from Everybody Knows the Monkey, 1998
- "Working Overtime", a song by the Sore Losers, 2014
