= One Two Three Four (EP) =

EP by The Saints
- Released: 1977
- Recorded: April 1977; Sydney
- Genre: Rock
- Label: Harvest, EMI
- Producer: Chris Bailey, Ed Kuepper

The Saints chronology
| (I'm) Stranded (1977) | One Two Three Four (1977) | Eternally Yours (1978) |

One Two Three Four is the first 7" extended play by Australian rock band the Saints. The EP contained two cover versions of other artists' work and two re-recorded tracks which originally appeared on their debut album (I'm) Stranded. It was originally released in the UK as both a single disc EP and a double 7" with a gatefold shelve. An Australian edition of the EP appeared in the following month. Australian musicologist, Ian McFarlane, felt their versions of "Lipstick on Your Collar" (originally by Connie Francis) and "River Deep – Mountain High" (originally by Ike and Tina Turner) were "ragged but inspired".

The complete EP was issued on CD in 2007 as bonus tracks to (I'm) Stranded.

== Track listing ==
=== Single disc EP ===
Side A
| No. | Title | Writer(s) | Length |
|---|---|---|---|
| 1. | "Lipstick On Your Collar" | Edna Lewis, George Goehring | 2:35 |
| 2. | "River Deep Mountain High" | Phil Spector, Ellie Greenwich, Jeff Barry | 3:53 |

Side B
| No. | Title | Writer(s) | Length |
|---|---|---|---|
| 1. | "Demolition Girl" | Ed Kuepper | 1:58 |
| 2. | "One Way Street" | Ed Kuepper, Chris Bailey | 2:51 |
| Total length: | | | 11:17 |

=== Two-disc 7" ===
Disc 1

| No. | Title | Writer(s) | Length |
|---|---|---|---|
| 1. | "Lipstick On Your Collar" | Lewis, Goehring |
| 2. | "River Deep Mountain High" | Spector, Greenwich, Barry |

Disc 2

| No. | Title | Writer(s) | Length |
|---|---|---|---|
| 1. | "Demolition Girl" | Kuepper |
| 2. | "One Way Street" | Kuepper, Bailey |

== Personnel ==
The Saints

- Chris Bailey - vocals
- Ed Kuepper - guitar
- Ivor Hay - drums
- Kym Bradshaw - bass guitar

== Catalogue numbers ==
- Australia (EP): EMI EMI 11597
- UK (EP): Harvest HAR5137
- UK (2 Disc 7"): Harvest 2HAR5137
