= Long March Through the Jazz Age =

Studio album by The Saints
- Released: November 28, 2025
- Recorded: 2018
- Studio: Church Street Studios
- Genre: Rock; blues rock; punk blues
- Length: 57:06
- Label: Fire Records
- Producer: Chris Carr, Elisabet Corlin

The Saints chronology
King of the Sun (2012)	Long March Through the Jazz Age (2025)

Long March Through the Jazz Age is the fifteenth and final studio album by Australian rock music group The Saints. Recorded by Chris Bailey in 2018 but left unfinished by the time of his death in 2022, it was later completed and released in November 2025.

== Recording ==
Professional ratings
Review scores
Source	Rating
Spill Magazine	4/5 stars
Classic Rock	3.5/5 stars
Uncut	4/5 stars
Mojo	4/5 stars
Louder Than War	4.5/5 stars
AllMusic	4/5 stars

The album was recorded at Church Street Studios in Sydney. Chris Bailey and longtime Saints drummer Pete Wilkinson travelled from Europe to work with guitarist and engineer Sean Carey, who had previously toured and recorded with the band. Additional contributions were provided by guitarist Davey Lane (You Am I), along with a group of Sydney-based horn, string, and keyboard players. The recordings were developed from Bailey’s original demo material.

== Release and reception ==
Long March Through the Jazz Age was released on November 28, 2025 to universal critical acclaim.

Classic Rock described the album as a fitting final release by Chris Bailey, praising the maturity of his songwriting and the character of his vocal performances, and highlighting tracks such as “Empires (Sometimes We Fall),” “Judas,” and the title track. Louder Than War characterized the album as a strong and emotionally resonant final statement released under The Saints name, noting its breadth of styles and singling out songs including “Vikings,” “Gasoline,” “Bruises,” and “Will You Still Be There.” AllMusic praised the album’s performances, arrangements, and production, drawing attention to Bailey’s vocals and songwriting and highlighting tracks such as “Vikings,” “A Vision of Grace,” “Judas,” and “Carnivore (Long March Through the Jazz Age).” Spill Magazine described the album as a carefully completed final work, noting its cohesive sound, melodic strength, and stylistic range, and referencing songs including “Imaginary Fields Forever,” “Empires (Sometimes We Fall),” and “Bruises.”

== Track listing ==
1. Empires (Sometimes We Fall) [sometimes we fall]
2. Break Away
3. Judas
4. Vikings
5. Gasoline
6. The Key
7. A Vision of Grace
8. Imaginary Fields Forever
9. Bruises
10. Resurrection Day
11. Carnivore (Long March Through The Jazz Age)
12. Will You Still Be There

== Personnel ==
- Chris Bailey – vocals, bass, acoustic guitar, electric guitar, keyboards
- Sean Carey – guitar, electric guitar, banjo, mellotron, engineering, mixing
- Peter Wilkinson – drums, percussion
- Davey Lane – guitar, electric guitar, ukelele
- Clare Kahn – cello
- Shannon Stitt – piano, organ
- Andy Judd – piano, organ, mellotron
- Danny Carmichael – trombone, trumpet
- Simon Ferenci – trumpet
- Vanessa Tammetta – violin
