= Imperious =

Imperious may refer to:

- Arrogant or haughty superiority to or disdain of those one views as unworthy
- Imperious - a fictional character in the Power Rangers franchise

== See also ==
- Imperialism - a strategy for building an empire
- Imperious Delirium, a 2008 album by Australian rock music group The Saints
- Superiority complex - a psychological condition
- Hubris - a personality trait
