= Know Your Product: The Best of The Saints =

Greatest hits album by The Saints
- Released: 1996
- Recorded: Window Studios, Roundhouse Studios, Wessex Studio and 1976–1978
- Label: Harvest
- Producer: Rod Coe, Chris Bailey and Ed Kuepper

The Saints chronology
Permanent Revolution (1991)	Know Your Product: The Best of The Saints (1996)	Howling (1997)

Professional ratings
Review scores
Source	Rating
Allmusic	4/5 stars

Know Your Product: The Best of The Saints is a 1996 compilation album of the Australian band The Saints' years with the EMI subsidiary Harvest Records.

== Track listing ==
1. "I'm Stranded"
2. "(This) Perfect Day" (Single version)
3. "Lipstick on Your Collar"
4. "River Deep, Mountain High" (Ike & Tina Turner Cover)
5. "Demolition Girl"
6. "One Way Street"
7. "Story of Love"
8. "Kissin' Cousins" (Elvis Presley Cover)
9. "No Time"
10. "Wild About You"
11. "Messin' With The Kid"
12. "Nights In Venice"
13. "Do The Robot"
14. "Know Your Product"
15. "Run Down"
16. "Lost and Found"
17. "Memories Are Made of This"
18. "Private Affair"
19. "A Minor Aversion"
20. "No, Your Product"
21. "Swing for the Crime"
22. "All Times Through Paradise"
