= Just Like Fire Would =

1986 single by The Saints

"Just like Fire Would"

Single by The Saints

from the album All Fools Day
- Released: March 1986
- Genre: Alternative rock; blues rock
- Length: 3:25
- Label: Mushroom
- Songwriter: Chris Bailey
- Producer: Hugh Jones

The Saints singles chronology
"Angels" (1984)	"Just like Fire Would" (1986)	"(You Can't Tamper with the) Temple of the Lord" (1986)

"Just Like Fire Would" is a song by Australian alternative rock band, the Saints, which is written by the band's lead singer, Chris Bailey, and was released as a single in March 1986. It was the lead single from their seventh studio album, All Fools Day (April 1986), and peaked at No. 29 on the Kent Music Report Singles Chart. It was produced by Hugh Jones, who had co-produced the album with Bailey. AllMusic's John Dougan reviewed All Fools Day and opined, "One listen to songs as grabbing as 'Celtic Ballad' or the great 'Just Like Fire Would' (which is kind of a neat pun) will convince you that despite the differences, the new Saints were a good band for completely different reasons than the old Saints."

In January 2018, as part of Triple M's "Ozzest 100", the 'most Australian' songs of all time, "Just Like Fire Would" was ranked number 88.

== Charts ==
Chart (1986)	Peak position
Australia (Kent Music Report)	29

== Bruce Springsteen version ==
"Just Like Fire Would"

Single by Bruce Springsteen

from the album High Hopes
- Released: 22 January 2014
- Recorded: 2013
- Studio: Studios 301, Sydney
- Genre: Rock
- Length: 3:53
- Label: Columbia
- Songwriter: Chris Bailey
- Producers: Ron Aniello; Bruce Springsteen

Bruce Springsteen singles chronology
"High Hopes" (2014)	"Just Like Fire Would" (2014)	"Hello Sunshine" (2019)

Music video
- "Just Like Fire Would" on YouTube

Bruce Springsteen and the E Street Band performed "Just like Fire Would" during the opening show of the Australian leg on their Wrecking Ball Tour in 2013. Later, Springsteen released a studio version of the song on his album titled High Hopes (14 January 2014). The song was released as the second single from the album, accompanied by a music video that Springsteen released on January 22, 2014.
