= Nouvelle Vague (disambiguation) =

Nouvelle Vague may refer to:

- French New Wave, mid 20th-century movement in French cinema
- Japanese New Wave, Japanese film movement
- Nouvelle Vague (band), French bossa nova band
  - Nouvelle Vague (album), 2004 self-titled studio album
- Nouvelle Vague (1990 film), film by Jean-Luc Godard
- Nouvelle Vague (2025 film), film by Richard Linklater

== See also ==
- New Wave (disambiguation)
