= Young Charlatans =

Australian punk band (1977–1978)

Young Charlatans were a briefly existing Australian punk rock band comprising Janine Hall on bass guitar, Jeffrey Wegener on drums, Ollie Olsen on vocals and guitar and Rowland S. Howard on guitar. They formed in 1977 and disbanded in the following year.

== History ==
Young Charlatans formed in December 1977 in Melbourne, after Ollie Olsen met Rowland S. Howard. They had both been in other bands, but after writing together, quit to form Young Charlatans. Jeffrey Wegener joined them on drums, and they moved to Sydney where they recruited bassist Janine Hall and began rehearsing. The band took influences from Can, Neu, Roxy Music, David Bowie, and other 1970s music.

After moving back to Melbourne, the band grew a strong reputation in the local scene, and recorded the song Shivers, originally written by Howard in 1976. Managed by Bruce Milne, they were meant to release music on his new Au Go Go Records label. A recorded session was held, with nine songs recorded, but they would remain unreleased.

Olsen quit and rejoined the band several times, and one week after recording Shivers the Young Charlatans broke up in May 1978. At the time, they had only performed thirteen gigs together in Melbourne. Their final performance was with Boys Next Door at a benefit for Pulp, a fanzine run by Bruce Milne and Clinton Walker.

Howard went to see Boys Next Door perform whenever he could, and would sometimes join them on stage. By the end of 1978, Howard had officially joined Boys Next Door and they were performing "Shivers", a song he had written for the Young Charlatans. It was released as the second single by the Boys Next Door in 1979. Another Young Charlatans song "Scatterbrain" was also released by Howard's new band in 1978.

After the Young Charlatans broke up, each member went on to other bands: Hall joined the Saints, Wegener joined Laughing Clowns, Olsen formed Whirlywirld and Howard joined Boys Next Door, which became The Birthday Party.

The original Young Charlatans version of "Shivers" was later released in the cassette magazine Fast Forward's fourth issue (April 1981).

When Howard died in 2009, many people remembered the Young Charlatans and the impact the band had on them in the short time they existed.

Bruce Milne listed the Young Charlatans as one of the bands that defined early punk in Melbourne. Clinton Walker called them pioneers of the post-punk rock in Australia. They became better known after breaking up due to the impact each band member had in their later careers.
