= Casablanca (album) =

Studio album by The Saints
- Released: 1982
- Recorded: February 1982
- Studio: Matrix Studios, London
- Genre: Alternative rock; post-punk
- Label: Lost (Australia 1982), Mushroom (Australian re-release 1987)
- Producer: Chris Bailey

The Saints chronology
The Monkey Puzzle (1981)	Casablanca (1982)	A Little Madness to Be Free (1984)

International Release
- Out in the Jungle...Where Things Ain't So Pleasant was the international version of Casablanca.

Professional ratings
Review scores
Source	Rating
Allmusic	3.5/5 stars

Casablanca is the fifth album by Australian punk band The Saints. The full title on the album's cover is I Thought This Was Love, but This Ain't Casablanca, however the official title of the album is simply Casablanca. It was released internationally as Out in the Jungle ... Where Things Ain't So Pleasant.

The Saints' founder and vocalist Chris Bailey said, "This is my own opinion, and it changes with a few drinks or whatever, but it's the first record I can actually say I like the atmosphere of, the closest I've ever got to making a record that... seems closer to what I had up here."

== Track listing ==
All tracks composed by Chris Bailey; except "Beginning of the Tomato Party"

1. "Follow the Leader" – 3:44
2. "Rescue" – 2:38
3. "Senile Dementia" – 5:14
4. "Casablanca" – 3:52
5. "Curtains" – 3:42
6. "Come On" – 2:55
7. "1000 Faces" – 3:05
8. "Animal" – 2:25
9. "Out in the Jungle" º 2:55
10. "Beginning of the Tomato Party" (Janine Hall, Iain Shedden, Chris Bailey) – 5:16
11. "Out of Sight" – 3:12

== Personnel ==
- Chris Bailey – vocals
- Janine Hall – bass
- Iain Shedden – drums
- Roger Cawkwell – saxophone, bass clarinet, organ
- Paul Neiman – trombone
- Steve Sidwell – trumpet
- Hugh McDowell – cello
- Denis Haines – piano on "Rescue"
- Jess Sutcliffe – piano on "Out in the Jungle"
- Brian James – lead guitar (on tracks 2, 8, 10, 11)

=== Production ===
- Chris Bailey – producer
- Jess Sutcliffe – engineer
