= (I'm) Stranded =

Studio album by The Saints
- Released: 21 February 1977
- Recorded: June, December 1976
- Studios: Window Studios, Brisbane
- Genre: Punk rock
- Length: 34:33
- Labels: EMI (Australia); Harvest (original UK release); Sire (original US release); Captain Oi! (1999 UK CD release); 4 Men with Beards (2003 US LP reissue)
- Producers: Mark Moffatt, Rod Coe

The Saints chronology
(I'm) Stranded (1977)	Eternally Yours (1978)

Singles from (I'm) Stranded
- 1. "(I'm) Stranded" Released: September 1976; 2. "Erotic Neurotic" Released: May 1977

(I'm) Stranded is the debut album by Australian punk rock group The Saints which was released by EMI on 21 February 1977. Their debut single, "(I'm) Stranded", was issued ahead of the album in September 1976, which Sounds magazine's reviewer, Jonh Ingham, declared was the "Single of this and every week". "Erotic Neurotic" was the second single, which was released in May 1977 and the group relocated to the United Kingdom.

In May 2001, Australasian Performing Right Association (APRA) celebrated its 75th anniversary and named "(I'm) Stranded" in its Top 30 Australian songs of all time. In 2007, 'I'm Stranded' was one of the first 20 songs added to the National Film and Sound Archive's Sounds of Australia registry. Their debut album was listed at No. 20 in the book, 100 Best Australian Albums, in October 2010.

== Background ==
The Saints formed in Brisbane in 1973 with original members Chris Bailey (singer-songwriter, later guitarist), Ed Kuepper (guitarist-songwriter), and Ivor Hay (drummer). In 1975, Kym Bradshaw joined on bass guitar. Contemporaneous with Ramones, the group were employing the fast tempos, raucous vocals and "buzz saw" guitar that characterised early punk rock. Kuepper explained that they played faster and faster as they were nervous in front of audiences. According to Australian rock historian, Ian McFarlane, they had developed their "own distinctive sound as defined by Kuepper's frenetic, whirlwind guitar style and Bailey's arrogant snarl".

In June 1976, The Saints recorded two tracks, "(I'm) Stranded" and "No Time" with Mark Moffatt producing. Unable to find an interested label, they formed Fatal Records and independently released the two tracks as their debut single in September 1976. Their self-owned Eternal Promotions sent discs to radio stations and magazines both in Australia – with little local interest – and the United Kingdom. In the UK, a small label, Power Exchange, issued the single. Sounds magazine's reviewer Jonh Ingham declared it, "Single of this and every week". EMI head office in London contacted the Sydney branch and directed that they be signed to a three-album contract.

Over two days in December, the group recorded their first LP album, (I'm) Stranded (21 February 1977), with Rod Coe producing. Kuepper said later that the album was "basically our live set and were also the oldest songs. And in particularly with 'Nights In Venice' and 'Messin' With The Kid', they were the first two songs we ever did." It included a cover version of The Missing Links' track "Wild About You". On the single tracks "(I'm) Stranded" and "No Time", Kuepper's guitar was tuned up a semitone, to emulate Bo Diddley. The other eight tracks were recorded over a weekend in December 1976. Kuepper used Mark Moffatt's 1960 Fender Super amp with no effect pedals on (I'm) Stranded and No Time. On the remainder of the album he used a vocal PA as his guitar amp, after his live amp had "blown up", and an MXR Distortion Plus pedal. The band recorded the tracks live, though with the guitar amp in the corridor to avoid spill.

The band supported AC/DC in late December 1976 and, early in 1977, relocated to Sydney. EMI re-issued the single "(I'm) Stranded" in February 1977 and it reached the Kent Music Report Top 100 Singles Chart. In May 1977, the band released their second single, "Erotic Neurotic" and then moved to the UK, where they differed with their label over how they should be marketed. EMI planned to promote them as a typical punk band, complete with ripped clothes and spiky hair – The Saints insisted on maintaining a more downbeat image.

In 2007, (I'm) Stranded was reissued as a CD with bonus tracks including the EP One Two Three Four and the single version of "This Perfect Day". In August of that year band members Bailey and Kuepper described their work for SBS-TV's documentary Great Australian Albums.

In November 2024, the album is scheduled for a limited edition 4× vinyl box set featuring the Original LP, alternate versions and live recording from Sydney and London, recorded in 1977.

== Reception ==
Professional ratings
Review scores
Source	Rating
AllMusic	5/5 stars
Christgau's Record Guide	B+
Encyclopedia of Popular Music	4/5 stars
The Great Alternative & Indie Discography	6/10
MusicHound Rock	4.5/5 stars
Q	4/5 stars
Record Mirror	5/5 stars
Uncut	4/5 stars

=== Contemporary reviews ===
Kris Needs in ZigZag May 1977 called it a "rip-snorter of an album" and "one hell of an album, although it's a bit patchy." Rolling Stone said it was, "an LP so coarse, brutal and maggot-infested it probably could excite only future archaeologists."

Robot A. Hull in Creem December 1977, reviewing the US edition released on Sire, said the Saints "easily match the savage revolt of bands like the Clash and the Jam" and called (I'm Stranded) "a pistol shot of an album worth getting stewed over".

The Village Voice's Robert Christgau wrote, "intermittent hooks, droning feedback, shouted vocals, and oldie about incest, this album from Australia achieves the great mean of punk style".

=== Retrospective reviews ===
In his review of (I'm) Stranded, Tim Sendra of AllMusic declared that the album "is the band's statement of purpose: it's three-and-a-half minutes of post-teenage angst wrapped in barbed wire that floors the listener right away while also setting the scene for the bruised and battered songs that follow.".

McFarlane described it as "full of rough, exhilarating rock'n'roll noise, and it remains one of the greatest debut albums of the era".

John Ballon of MustHear writes the album is "a devastating listen, loaded with the same irresistible power ... [and] has all the intense purity of a band hell bent on making a racket, regardless of its commercial viability".

== Accolades ==
In May 2001, Australasian Performing Right Association (APRA) celebrated its 75th anniversary and named "(I'm) Stranded" in its Top 30 Australian songs of all time. In 2007, "I'm Stranded" was one of the first 20 songs stored on the National Film and Sound Archive's Sounds of Australia registry. The album was listed at No. 20 in the book 100 Best Australian Albums in October 2010. Fact ranked it the 20th best album of the 1970s in 2014, calling it "easily one of the best – and probably the noisiest – albums to emerge from punk's first wave."

The State Library of Queensland named its copy of "(I'm) Stranded" as one of the treasures from its John Oxley Library collection, citing the 7-inch (18 cm) vinyl single represented a piece of Australian and Queensland music history, influencing generations of bands around the world.

== Track listing ==
All tracks are written by Chris Bailey and Ed Kuepper except where shown (Note: Song writing credits for Chris Bailey and Ed Kuepper adapted from American Society of Composers, Authors and Publishers (ASCAP).; "Wild About You" was written by Andy N J Anderson (aka Andy James) for his 1960s band, The Missing Links.; "Kissin' Cousins" was written by Fred Wise and Randy Starr and performed by Elvis Presley for the 1964 film Kissin' Cousins.; "Lipstick on Your Collar" was written by Edna Lewis and George Goehring, and was issued as a single in 1959 by Connie Francis.; "River Deep – Mountain High" was written by Phil Spector, Jeff Barry, Ellie Greenwich, and was issued as a single in 1966 by Ike & Tina Turner.)

Side A
No.	Title	Writer(s)	Length
1.	"(I'm) Stranded"		3:29
2.	"One Way Street"		2:56
3.	"Wild About You"	Andy James	2:36
4.	"Messin' with the Kid"		5:55
5.	"Erotic Neurotic"		4:07

Side B
No.	Title	Writer(s)	Length
1.	"No Time"		2:48
2.	"Kissin' Cousins"	Fred Wise, Randy Starr	2:00
3.	"Story of Love"	Kuepper	3:12
4.	"Demolition Girl"	Kuepper	1:42
5.	"Nights in Venice"		5:41
Total length:			34:33

1997 CD release bonus tracks
No.	Title	Writer(s)	Length
11.	"Lipstick on Your Collar"	George Goehring, Edna Lewis	2:37
12.	"River Deep – Mountain High"	Phil Spector, Jeff Barry, Ellie Greenwich	3:55
Total length:			41:04

2007 CD release bonus tracks
No.	Title	Writer(s)	Length
11.	"Untitled" (out-take)		2:56
12.	"This Perfect Day" (single version)		2:12
13.	"Lies"		2:05
14.	"Do the Robot"	Kuepper	2:44
15.	"Lipstick on Your Collar"	Goehring, Lewis	2:35
16.	"One Way Street"		2:52
17.	"Demolition Girl"	Kuepper	1:59
18.	"River Deep – Mountain High"	Spector, Barry, Greenwich	3:53
Total length:			55:51

== Personnel ==
The Saints members (Note: Credits according to album notes: 1977 Australian version.; 1997 CD version.; 2007 CD version.)

- Chris Bailey – vocals
- Kym Bradshaw – bass guitar (tracks 1–10, 11–13 on 2007 release)
- Ivor Hay – drums
- Ed Kuepper – guitar
- Alasdair "Algy" Ward – bass guitar (tracks 11–12 on 1997 release, 14–18 on 2007 release)

Additional musicians

- The Flat Top Four – backing vocals (track 7)

Production

- Rod Coe – producer (except tracks 1, 6 or bonus tracks)
- Mark Moffatt – producer (only tracks 1, 6)
- Bailey, Kuepper – producer (only bonus tracks)

== In popular culture ==
The song "(I'm) Stranded" is used as the theme music in the supernatural comedy drama TV series Spirited, which features the ghost of a 1980s punk rock star.

"(I'm) Stranded" was used by the Black Label Skateboards company in their video "Black Out" for skateboarder Ragdoll's part.
