= Nothing Is Straight in My House =

Nothing is Straight in My House

Studio album by The Saints
- Released: 2005
- Recorded: Amsterdam Recording Studio, Brekulen, NL
- Label: United for Opportunity U.S.,Cadiz UK, Liberation AUS
- Producer: Chris Bailey, Chris Carr, Richard England

The Saints chronology
All Times Through Paradise (2004)	Nothing is Straight in My House (2005)	The Greatest Cowboy Movie Never Made (2006)

Professional ratings
Review scores
Source	Rating
Allmusic	link

Nothing is Straight in My House is the twelfth studio album released by The Saints.

== Track listing ==
All tracks composed by Chris Bailey; except where indicated

1. "Porno Movies" - 3:08
2. "A Madman Wrecked My Happy Home" - 2:32
3. "Nothing Is Straight In My House" - 4:32
4. "Digging a Hole" - 3:59
5. "I Couldn't Help Myself" - 4:38
6. "Paint The Town Electric" - 4:12
7. "Nylon Pirates" - 3:03
8. "Bang On" - 3:13
9. "Taking Tea With Aphrodite" (Bailey, Wijnberg) - 2:57
10. "Passing Strange" (Bailey, Willson-Piper) - 5:06
11. "Garden Dark" - 7:19
12. "Where Is My Monkey?" (Bailey, Wilkinson) - 3:08
13. "Nothing Is Straight (Slight Return)" - 2:33

All Tracks:copyright Lost Music/Mushroom Music, Except (9) published by Lost music/ Mushroom Music/ Sony atv, (10)and (12) Lost Music/Mushroom Music, Copyright control

== Personnel ==
- Chris Bailey - vocals, guitar
- Marty Willson-Piper - guitar
- Caspar Wijnberg - bass
- Pete Wilkinson - drums
