= Eternally Yours (album) =

Studio album by the Saints
- Released: May 1978
- Recorded: Late 1977
- Studios: Roundhouse, London
- Genre: Punk rock
- Length: 36:02
- Labels: Harvest (UK & Australia); Sire (original US release); Captain Oi! (1999 UK CD reissue); EMI Music Australia (Australian 2004 Reissue); 4 Men With Beards (2011 US LP reissue)
- Producers: Chris Bailey & Ed Kuepper

The Saints chronology
One Two Three Four (1977)	Eternally Yours (1978)	Prehistoric Sounds (1979)

Eternally Yours is the second album by Australian punk rock band the Saints, released in 1978. Produced by band members Chris Bailey and Ed Kuepper, the album saw the band pursue a bigger, more R&B-driven sound, augmented by a horn section. The album also saw the introduction of bass guitarist Algy Ward, who replaced the band's previous bass player, Kym Bradshaw in mid-1977.

== Background ==
The album was originally titled International Robots, and recording initially commenced at Wessex Studios. The tapes from these sessions (which have since been released as bonus tracks on the 2007 reissue of the album) reveal the songs in a stripped-down form more similar to the band's previous recordings. The sessions also include "Champagne Misery", which was not released until 2000's Wild About You compilation.

Chris Bailey later said, "For me, it's our first proper release because (I'm) Stranded was just a load of demos. Although we still had the same energy as the first album, the added horn section seemed to confuse people and the record sort of disappeared." In another interview, Bailey stated, "When people talk to me about the early Saints in hallowed terms, I find it a little bit amusing, because when I think about something like 'Lost & Found' or 'Misunderstood', I kind of think that's crap."

== Reception ==
Professional ratings
Review scores
Source	Rating
AllMusic	4.5/5 stars
Christgau's Record Guide	C+
The Encyclopedia of Popular Music	4/5 stars
The Great Alternative & Indie Discography	6/10
Hi-Fi News & Record Review	A/B:1/1*
MusicHound Rock	5/5 stars
The Rolling Stone Record Guide	4/5 stars 3.5/5 stars

Reviewing Eternally Yours at the time of its release, Roadrunner said, "Their English experience has done them the world of good: they are musically tighter without losing any of the fast and furious punch that is the trademark, but it's their lyrics that have really developed." Robert Christgau, however, was more critical in his assessment, writing: "the lyrics are received protest, the tempos have slackened, and if those horns are somebody's idea of a joke I am not amused."

Retrospective reviews of the album have been far more positive. Writing for AllMusic, Mark Deming reflected that while the album "didn't sound like a standard-issue punk album in 1978, [...] it's stood the test of time much better than most of the work of punk's first graduating class." "With consistency and tasteful variety (handling sharp acoustic ballads as well as the standard burners)," wrote Trouser Press, "the LP is deservedly regarded as a punk classic". The album is listed in the book 1001 Albums You Must Hear Before You Die.

The album has continued to receive praise from numerous musicians as well. According to Byron Coley, Mike Saunders of Angry Samoans-fame had once declared that Eternally Yours "was the only album that deserved to have a lyric sheet". John Robb of The Membranes described the album as "one of the classic hidden gems of the punk canon", adding, "The band married Ed Kuepper's Wall of Sound guitars and Chris Bailey's fantastic sneering vocals with the fattest, baddest horn section and made it work." He claims the album was a "new template" for future punk releases. Tim Sommer, writing for The New York Observer, called it "not only one of the best albums to come out of the whole first wave of punk, it’s also one of the best albums of the decade." Mark Lanegan of Screaming Trees-fame included the album on his list of 12 "must-have" CDs, comparing it to a "greatest-hits record." Kurt Cobain included the song "Know Your Product" amongst his top 50 records of all time.

== Track listing ==
All tracks composed by Ed Kuepper and Chris Bailey; except where indicated.

Side A
No.	Title	Writer(s)	Length
1.	"Know Your Product"		3:15
2.	"Lost and Found"		3:50
3.	"Memories Are Made of This"	Ed Kuepper	2:20
4.	"Private Affair"		2:05
5.	"A Minor Aversion"		3:07
6.	"No, Your Product"		4:07

Side B
No.	Title	Writer(s)	Length
1.	"This Perfect Day"		2:30
2.	"Run Down"		2:32
3.	"Orstralia"	Ed Kuepper	2:24
4.	"New Centre of the Universe"		2:21
5.	"Untitled"		2:47
6.	"(I'm) Misunderstood"		2:46
7.	"International Robots"		1:58
Total length:			36:02

2007 reissue bonus tracks
No.	Title	Length
1.	"Orstralia" (The International Robot Sessions)
2.	"Lost and Found" (The International Robot Sessions)
3.	"The Ballad" (The International Robot Sessions. Early version of "Memories Are Made of This")
4.	"This Perfect Day" (The International Robot Sessions)
5.	"Run Down" (The International Robot Sessions)
6.	"A Minor Aversion" (The International Robot Sessions)
7.	"Champagne Misery" (The International Robot Sessions)
8.	"Private Affair" (The International Robot Sessions)
9.	"No, Your Product" (The International Robot Sessions)
10.	"New Centre of the Universe" (The International Robot Sessions)
11.	"River Deep Mountain High" (The International Robot Sessions)
12.	"Untitled" (The International Robot Sessions)
13.	"(I'm) Misunderstood" (The International Robot Sessions)
14.	"Do the Robot" (The International Robot Sessions)

All Tracks:copyright Saints Music\Mushroom Music

== Personnel ==
The Saints

- Chris Bailey – vocals
- Ed Kuepper – guitar
- Ivor Hay – drums
- Algy Ward – bass guitar

Additional musicians

- Graham Preskett – brass arrangements
- Iain Ward – harmonica
- The International Robot Choir – backing vocals

Technical

- Bill Price – engineering
- Mark Dearnley – engineering
- Peter Vernon – front cover photography

== Charts ==
Chart (1978)	Peak position
Australian Albums (Kent Music Report)	86
