= A Little Madness to Be Free =

Studio album by The Saints
- Released: July 1984
- Recorded: A Studio Sydney, Australia. Additional recording at Richmond Recorders Melbourne, Australia. Mixed at Alberts Studio Sydney, Australia
- Genre: Alternative rock; post-punk
- Label: Lost (France); RCA (Australian 1984); Mushroom Records (Australian 1989 Reissue)
- Producer: Lurax Debris (Chris Bailey)

The Saints chronology
Casablanca (1982)	A Little Madness to Be Free (1984)	All Fools Day (1986)

Singles from A Little Madness to Be Free
- 1. "Ghost Ships" Released: 1984; 2. "Imagination" Released: 1984; 3. "Angels (Remix)" Released: 1984

A Little Madness to Be Free is the sixth album by Australian band the Saints. This time around, frontman Chris Bailey persuaded original members, Kim Bradshaw (bass) and Ivor Hay (drums), to rejoin the band. On the album tour, the bass player was Tracy Pew, formerly of the Birthday Party. The title of the album is a reference to the quote "A person needs a little madness, or else they never dare cut the rope and be free," by Kazantzakis. The album saw the Bailey moving further towards more ambitious arrangements including horns and strings. Bailey stated in a retrospective interview about this approach that he wanted to "make strings as powerful as Les Pauls and Marshalls".

== Reception ==
Retrospectively, All Music gave the album a positive review writing "By this point in his career, Bailey had come into his own as an arranger and it really shows. Certainly one of their most obscure discs, but ultimately as rewarding as their classics I'm Stranded, Eternally Yours and All Fools Day.". The Guardian cited "Ghost Ships" in their The Saints: Their Five Greatest Moments retrospective.

In the Encyclopedia of Australian Rock and Pop, Ian McFarlane said the album was "more rock-orientated, with extensive use of acoustic guitar, brass and strings set among tightly-focussed arrangements. With Bailey's booming, bluesy voice in fine form, it may well constitute his most fully realised project."

Professional ratings
Review scores
Source	Rating
Allmusic	link

== Track listing ==
All tracks composed by Chris Bailey

Side A
No.	Title	Length
1.	"Ghost Ships"	3:41
2.	"Some One to Tell Me"	2:48
3.	"Down the Drain"	2:28
4.	"It's Only Time"	3:26
5.	"Imagination"	3:00

Side B
No.	Title	Length
1.	"Wrapped Up and Blue"	3:35
2.	"Walk Away"	3:00
3.	"Photograph"	3:56
4.	"The Hour"	5:43
5.	"Angel"	3:34

=== The New Rose version ===
The French label New Rose released an alternate track listing included an extra track "Heavy Metal" and an omitting "Wrapped Up and Blue".

New Rose release
No.	Title	Length
1.	"Down the Drain"	2:28
2.	"Walk Away"	3:00
3.	"Photograph"	3:56
4.	"The Hour"	5:43
5.	"Angel"	3:34
6.	"Imagination"	3:00
7.	"It's Only Time"	3:26
8.	"Some One to Tell Me"	2:48
9.	"Heavy Metal"	2:57
10.	"Ghost Ships"	3:41

== Personnel ==
- Performers – Chris Bailey, Alex Hamilton, Chris Burnham, Emile Kiss, Fiona Morphett, Iain Shedden, Ivor Hay, Janine Hall, Michael Charles, Pearl Bayly, Richard Daniell, Sally Schinckel-Brown
- Engineers – Tony Cohen and David Hemmings
- Executive producers – Neville Bicci Henderson and Paul Comrie-Thompson
- Photography – Bob King
