= Peter Wilkinson (drummer) =

Australian drummer

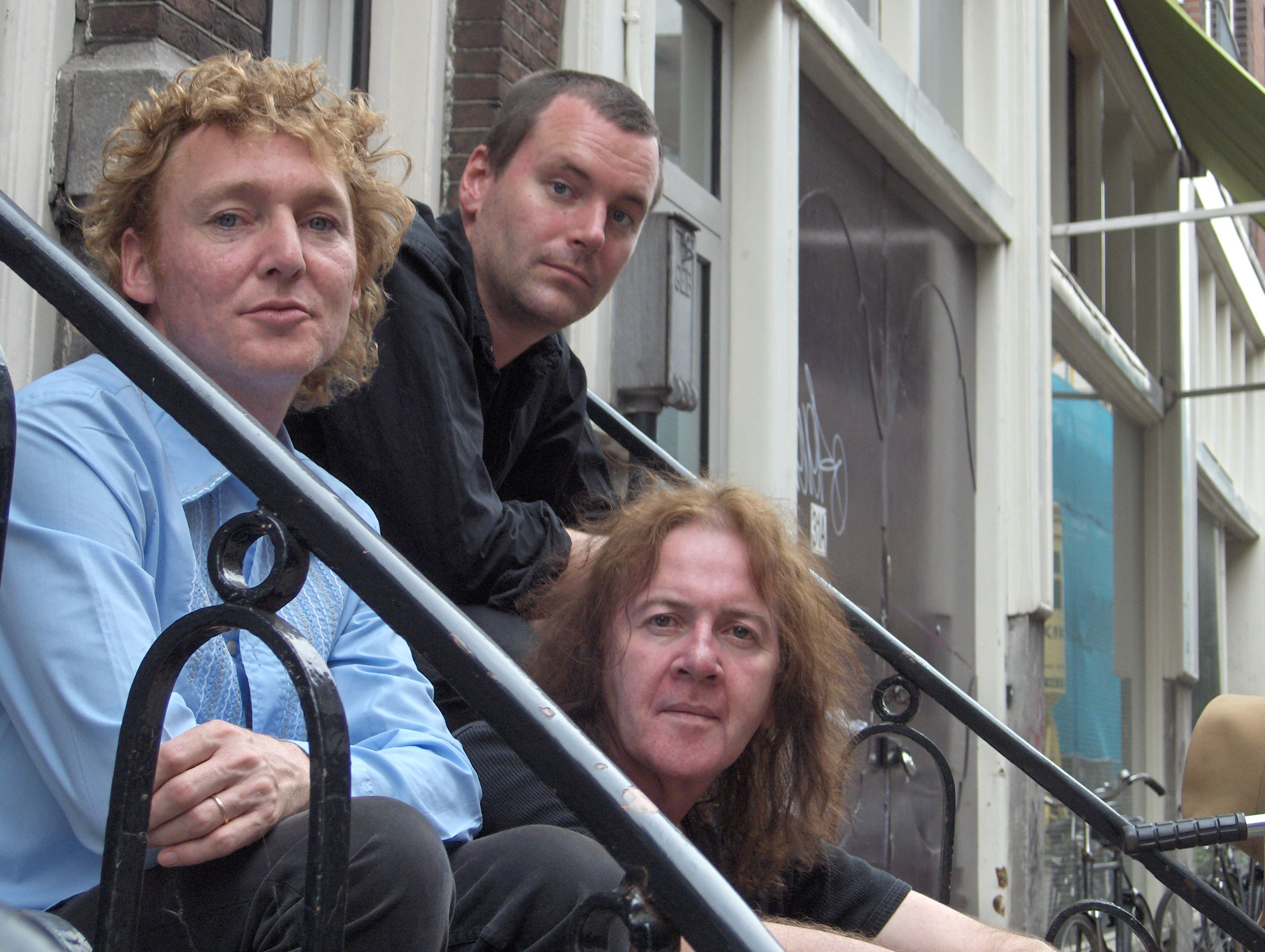
- Peter Wilkinson, Caspar Wijnberg, Chris Bailey; Amsterdam, July 2006

Background information
- Born: United Kingdom
- Genres: Rock, punk, post-punk, blues, grunge, folk
- Occupation: Drummer
- Years active: 1999–present
- Label: Highway 125
- Formerly of: The Saints
- Website: saintsmusic.com

Peter Wilkinson is a drummer who was a member of the rock band The Saints.

Wilkinson joined the group in 1999, and appeared first on the 2001 album Spit the Blues Out and, later, on Nothing is Straight in My House (2005) and Imperious Delirium (2006).

Wilkinson then joined The Saints band mate Chris Bailey on a detour with French band H-Burns to form Bailey Burns. They recorded the album Stranger, released 2011, and proceeded to tour in France. The Saints album King of the Sun, released in 2013, was recorded in Trackdown studios, Sydney, again with Wilkinson behind the drums.

== Discography ==
- Spit the Blues Out (2001) – The Saints
- Nothing is Straight in My House (2005) – The Saints
- Imperious Delirium (2006) – The Saints
- Bone Box (2005) – Chris Bailey & The General Dog
- Stranger (2011) – Bailey Burns
- King of the Sun (2013) – The Saints
