= Prodigal Son (The Saints album) =

Studio album by The Saints
- Released: April 1988
- Studio: Redan Recorders, London; Quad Recording Studios, New York City
- Genre: Pop punk
- Label: Mushroom Australia, TVT US
- Producer: Chris Bailey, Brian McGee

The Saints chronology
All Fools Day (1986)	Prodigal Son (1988)	Howling (1997)

Professional ratings
Review scores
Source	Rating
Allmusic	3/5 stars

Prodigal Son is the eighth studio album released by The Saints. It was released in 1988.

== Track listing ==
All tracks composed by Chris Bailey; except where indicated

1. "Grain of Sand" – 3:49
2. "Fire and Brimstone" – 3:27
3. "Friend of the People" – 3:16
4. "Before Hollywood" – 3:40
5. "Sold Out" – 3:20
6. "Ghost Ships" – 3:51
7. "Massacre" – 2:48
8. "Tomorrow" – 3:32
9. "Stay" – 3:46
10. "Shipwreck" – 3:35
11. "Music Goes 'Round My Head" (Harry Vanda, George Young) – 3:34 (CD Bonus Track in Australia)

The CD release featured a cover of The Easybeats song "Music Goes 'Round My Head" at the end of the album. This was recorded for the soundtrack of the Australian film Young Einstein. For the US release, the song was the second track on the album. The streaming release features the original Australian CD release track listing.

== Charts ==
Chart (1988)	Peak position
Australia (Kent Music Report)	50

== Personnel ==
The Saints

- Barrington Francis – guitar
- Arturo LaRizza – bass, string and horn arrangements
- Chris Bailey – vocals, guitar
- Joe Chiofalo – keyboards
- Iain Shedden – drums, percussion

Technical

- Beth Cumber – art direction
- Ian White – art direction
- Brian McGee – mixing
- Harry Vanda – producer (on "Music Goes Round My Head" only)
- George Young – producer (on "Music Goes Round My Head" only)
- Mark Opitz – remixing
