= Prehistoric Sounds =

Studio album by The Saints
- Released: October 1978
- Recorded: Mid-1978
- Studio: Wessex Sound Studios, London
- Genre: Punk rock; pop rock; post-punk
- Label: Harvest
- Producer: Chris Bailey, Ed Kuepper

The Saints chronology
Eternally Yours (1978)	Prehistoric Sounds (1978)	Paralytic Tonight, Dublin Tomorrow (EP) (1980)

Prehistoric Sounds is the third album by the Australian punk rock group The Saints, released in 1978 via Harvest. This was the final album to feature founding lead guitarist, Ed Kuepper, who left the band shortly after its release. In October 2010, the album was listed in the top 50 in the book, 100 Best Australian Albums with their debut, (I'm) Stranded, at No. 20.

== Background ==
Australian punk rock group, The Saints, had relocated to the United Kingdom in mid-1977. They released their second album, Eternally Yours, in May the next year on EMI/Harvest with band members Chris Bailey (also on lead vocals) and Ed Kuepper (also on lead guitar) producing. The other members of The Saints were Ivor Hay on drums and Algy Ward on bass guitar. The album reached the Top 100 on the Australian Kent Music Report Albums Chart.

The soul influenced third album, Prehistoric Sounds, followed in October 1978 (January 1979 in Australia). Its commercial failure led EMI to drop the band. During 1978, relations between Kuepper and Bailey had deteriorated, with Bailey preferring rock and pop songs and Kuepper pursuing less commercial and more intellectual material. Bailey later admitted Prehistoric Sounds was, "not one of my personal favourite records." Finally Hay, Kuepper and Ward left the group in early 1979.

Kuepper returned to Australia and followed a more avant-garde direction with Laughing Clowns, which would frequently feature brass. Hay briefly returned to Australia to join Sydney-based The Hitmen and then rejoined Bailey in London for a later version of The Saints. Ward became a member of English gothic punk band, The Damned. Bailey continued the group with Mark Birmingham on drums, Bruce Callaway on guitar, Barry Francis on guitar and Janine Hall on bass guitar.

Bailey later said, "I think there are a few good songs on that album. But it feels stilted in places, it sounds like a record made by a band falling apart, and sure enough soon after recording the album, the line-up of the band changed quite drastically." When critic Clinton Walker said he thought it was one of the best albums of the year, Bailey responded, "I listen to that record and some things work and some things don't," before acknowledging that his opinion might be tarnished by his memories of the recording session.

== Reception ==
Clinton Walker said Prehistoric Sounds was, "an extraordinary record – one of the period's best bar none – a brooding, melancholic collision of electrically charged rock balladry and swooping, brassy arrangements. Broadly misunderstood, it meant nothing to no-one."

AllMusic's Andy Kellman described the album as "the textbook by which to make a great rock record where horns play as much of a role as guitar". In October 2010, the album was listed in the top 50 in the book, 100 Best Australian Albums with their debut, (I'm) Stranded, at No. 20.

Professional ratings
Review scores
Source	Rating
AllMusic	4/5 stars
The Encyclopedia of Popular Music	3/5 stars
Hi-Fi News & Record Review	A/B:1/1*

== Track listing ==
All tracks composed by Ed Kuepper and Chris Bailey; except where indicated.

No.	Title	Writer(s)	Length
1.	"Swing for the Crime"		3:41
2.	"All Times Through Paradise"		4:08
3.	"Every Day's a Holiday, Every Night's a Party"		2:48
4.	"Brisbane (Security City)"	Ed Kuepper	4:22
5.	"Church of Indifference"	Ed Kuepper	5:05
6.	"Crazy Googenheimer Blues"		2:32
7.	"Everything's Fine"	Ed Kuepper	2:37
8.	"The Prisoner"		5:00
9.	"Security"	Otis Redding	2:22
10.	"This Time"		3:15
11.	"Take This Heart of Mine"	Chris Bailey	2:28
12.	"The Chameleon"		5:16
13.	"Save Me"	Aretha Franklin, Carolyn Franklin, Curtis Ousley	3:34
Total length:			47:08

== 2007 Reissue ==
In 2007 Prehistoric Sounds was reissued with bonus tracks:

14. "Looking for the Sun" [studio outtake from Prehistoric Sounds]
15. "Intermission" [live at Paddington Town Hall, Sydney 21 April 1977]
16. "This Perfect Day" [live at Paddington Town Hall, Sydney 21 April 1977]
17. "Run Down" [live at Paddington Town Hall, Sydney 21 April 1977]
18. "Erotic Neurotic" [live at Paddington Town Hall, Sydney 21 April 1977]
19. "Demolition Girl" [live at Paddington Town Hall, Sydney 21 April 1977]
20. "Nights in Venice" [live at Paddington Town Hall, Sydney 21 April 1977]

Produced by Ed Kuepper and Chris Bailey

All Tracks:copyright Saints Music\Mushroom Music

== Personnel ==
The Saints

- Chris Bailey – vocals
- Ed Kuepper – guitar
- Ivor Hay – drums, percussion
- Algy Ward – bass guitar

with:

- Martin Bruce – trumpet
- Martin Drover – trumpet
- Paul Nieman – trombone
- Roger Cawkwell – tenor, alto, baritone & soprano saxophone, piano, brass arrangements

Technical

- Bill Price – engineer
- Jerry Green – second engineer
- Gary Ede, Peter Vernon – photography
