= Dat Adam =

German hip hop-cloud rap group

- Also known as: Hydra Clique
- Origin: Germany
- Genres: Cloud rap; hip hop; trap; experimental hip-hop
- Years active: 2014-2018
- Label: Hydra Music
- Members: Daniel Tjarks; Ardian Bora; Marius Ley

Dat Adam, also known as DFA and stylized DAT ADAM, was a German hip hop-cloud rap group which was signed to BMG. Its three members are former YouTube stars Ardy (Ardian Bora), Taddl (Daniel Tjarks), and record producer Marley (Marius Ley).

== Career ==
=== Formation and Chrome (2014–2015) ===
Ardian Bora and Taddl Tjarks met Marius Ley through Izzi, their YouTube colleague, in 2014. That summer Tjarks and Ley produced Motus, an EP which reached number 35 on the German album chart for one week.

Bora and Tjarks then formed the rap group Dat Adam with Marius Ley. The Hydra, a symbol of the band, is tattooed on the members' fingers.

The EP Chrome, primarily produced by Ley, was released as a download on April 24, 2015. The single "Forrest" began receiving airplay a week earlier, and reached the top five on the Austrian singles chart. Chrome reached the top five on the German-language album charts, reaching number one in Austria. Dat Adam headlined the 2015 VideoDays in Berlin and Düsseldorf's 2015 Web Video Awards.

=== Hydra 3D and How to Flex & Troll a Scene (2016–present) ===
The band performed in July 2016 at Berlin's Peace x Peace festival. The performance included two new songs, "Lennon 2" and "Ghidorah/Legobricks", from their album Hydra 3D. The other song, "Blau & Pink", was released shortly before the festival.

In October 2016, Tjarks announced on Twitter that the group was releasing their debut album and opening an online shop. The album, Hydra 3D was released on October 28 with an eponymous single. The song's music video was directed by Shawn Bu, who directed the short film Darth Maul: Apprentice. The album was released on Hydra Music, their own label.

In November 2016, Dat Adam's seven-date Space-Camp tour began in Munich and ended in Dresden. The band released their second EP, How to Flex & Troll a Scene, on March 24, 2017. Four days later, they began their Space-Camp-2017 tour. In early June, Dat Adam performed at the Rock am Ring and Rock im Park festivals. After the rock versions of their older songs were well-received by the festival audiences, Dat Adam announced the release of their third EP (Cyber Rock – EP) in a December 18, 2017 video. Released on December 29, it contained five rock versions of their older cyber-rap songs. Accompanying the EP was a music video, "DFA (CR-Version)".

== Discography ==
=== Albums ===
Year	Title	Peak positions			Remarks
Year	Title	Germany	Austria	Switzerland	Remarks
2016	Hydra 3D	5	5	11	Released October 28, 2016
2018	newWAVE	21	15	40	Released September 21, 2018

=== EPs ===
Year	Title	Peak positions			Remarks
Year	Title	Germany	Austria	Switzerland	Remarks
2015	Chrome	5	1	3	Released April 24, 2015
2017	How to Flex & Troll a Scene	29	9	19	Released March 24, 2017
2017	Cyber Rock	—	15	36	Released December 29, 2017

=== Singles ===
Year	Title Album	Peak positions			Remarks
Year	Title Album	Germany	Austria	Switzerland	Remarks
2015	"Forrest"; Chrome	22	5	31	Entered chart April 26, 2015
2015	"700 Main St"; Chrome	38	18	53	Entered chart May 3, 2015
2015	"UFO"; Chrome	91	44	—	Entered chart May 5, 2015
2015	"DFA"; Chrome	92	47	—	Entered chart May 5, 2015
2015	"Session"; Chrome	—	70	—	Entered chart June 10, 2016
2015	"Hydra 3D"; Hydra 3D	87	58	—	Entered chart November 4, 2016

=== Music videos ===
Year	Title	Director	Length
2015	"Forrest"	T7pro	1:12
2015	"700 Main St"	Shawn Bu, Vi-Dan Tran	1:21
2015	"UFO"	T7pro	1:49
2016	"Hydra 3D"	Shawn Bu	4:53
2016	"Lennon 2"	Luna Darko	4:18
2017	"FLY"	Octavian Petreanu	1:53
2017	"Sanageyama"	Fabian Epe	3:22
2017	"xD"	Luna Darko, Hydra Clique	4:00
2017	"DFA (CR-Version)"	T	5:13
