= Paralytic Tonight, Dublin Tomorrow =

EP by the Saints
- Released: March 1980
- Recorded: London, 1980
- Label: Lost/EMI; New Rose
- Producer: Les Lambert

The Saints chronology
Prehistoric Sounds (1979)	Paralytic Tonight, Dublin Tomorrow (1980)	The Monkey Puzzle (1980)

Paralytic Tonight, Dublin Tomorrow is a 7" extended play released in March 1980 by Australian punk band the Saints. It was produced by the group's singer-guitarist, Chris Bailey using the pseudonym L. Lambert. It is their first release after founding guitarist, Ed Kuepper, had left the band. The Saints line-up for the EP was Chris Bailey on lead vocals and guitar; C. Barrington on guitar; Cub Calloway on guitar; Ivor Hay on drums; and Janine Hall on bass guitar. A 12" version with an additional track, "Miss Wonderful", was issued on the French label, New Rose.

== Reception ==
Clinton Walker described Paralytic Tonight, Dublin Tomorrow as, "shambolic in the extreme, but still possessed of a certain spark." Australian musician, Paul Kelly remembered that he had "cottoned onto the Saints around the time of Prehistoric Sounds, their third album. Paralytic Tonight is a four track EP that came not long after. I played it over and over again in a flat on Punt Road. This was their great middle period." AllMusic's Mark Deming rated it as three-and-a-half stars out of five and explained, "While these four songs (or five, depending on which version you buy) are tougher and more rock-oriented than the albums that would soon follow from Bailey's edition of the group, they're still a far cry from the breakneck fury of (I'm) Stranded or Eternally Yours."

== Track listing ==
The back cover to the Australian release.

Australian release

- Lost Records/EMI (PRS-2773)

Side A

1. "Simple Love" (Chris Bailey) – (3:45)
2. "(Don't send me) Roses" (Bailey) – (3:50)

Side B

1. "On the Waterfront" (Bailey) – (3:20)
2. "Call It Mine" (Bailey) – (4:50)

French release

- New Rose (NEW-1)

Side A

1. "Simple Love" (Bailey) – (3:40)
2. "(Don't send me) Roses" (Bailey) – (5:22)
3. "Miss Wonderful" (Bailey) – (4:20)

Side B

1. "On the Waterfront" (Bailey) – (3:18)
2. "Call It Mine" (Bailey) – (4:52)

The back cover to the French release.

== Personnel ==
The Saints

- Chris Bailey - vocals, guitar
- Barrington Francis, Bruce "Cub" Callaway - guitar
- Janine Hall - bass
- Ivor Hay - drums

Technical

- Les Lambert - recording
- John Morgan - cover
- Judi Dransfield - photography
