= Spit the Blues Out =

Studio album by The Saints
- Released: 2000
- Studio: Aluna Studios, Amsterdam
- Genre: Punk blues
- Label: Last Call (FR), Raven (AUS)
- Producer: Chris Bailey, Brendan Bailey

The Saints chronology
Everybody Knows the Monkey (1998)	Spit the Blues Out (2000)	All Times Through Paradise (2004)

Professional ratings
Review scores
Source	Rating
Allmusic	4/5 stars

Spit the Blues Out is the eleventh studio album released by The Saints.

== Track listing ==
All tracks composed by Chris Bailey; except where indicated

1. "A Gentleman Came Walking" - 4:09
2. "Who's Been Talking?" (Chester Burnett) - 2:59
3. "Waiting for God (Oh!)" - 3:44
4. "The Beginning of a Beautiful Friendship Louis" - 4:42
5. "Where Did My Mind Go?" - 2:53
6. "I Want to Be with You Tonight" (James Moore) - 5:06
7. "Drunken Angel" - 5:33
8. "Spit the Blues Out" - 6:37
9. "Mojo Erectus Howls" - 3:43
10. Unknown - 1:17
11. "Before You Accuse Me" (Ellas McDaniel) - 3:07
12. Unknown - 0:31
13. "You Got a Tale Babe" - 2:26
14. "It Hurts Me Too" (Elmore James) - 3:49

== Personnel ==
- Chris Bailey - composer, vocals, guitar
- Michael Bayliss - bass, backing vocals
- Peter Wilkinson - drums, organ, backing vocals
- Patrick Mathé - harmonica, guitar
- Brendan Bailey - backing vocals
- Elisabet Corlin - backing vocals
- Caspar Wijnberg - Production/engineering and additional keyboards
