= All Fools Day (album) =

Studio album by The Saints
- Released: 1986
- Recorded: Winter 1985
- Studios: Rockfield Studios, Wales. Mixed at Eden Studios, London
- Genres: Alternative rock; post-punk
- Label: Mushroom
- Producers: Chris Bailey, Hugh Jones.

The Saints chronology
A Little Madness to Be Free (1984)	All Fools Day (1986)	Prodigal Son (1988)

Singles from All Fools Day
- 1. "Just Like Fire Would" Released: 1986; 2. "Temple of the Lord" Released: 1986; 3. "See You in Paradise" Released: 1986

Professional ratings
Review scores
Source	Rating
Allmusic	4.5/5 stars

All Fools Day is the seventh album by the Australian music group The Saints released in 1986. The album was The Saints' commercial breakthrough into the US, with the videos for "Just Like Fire Would" and "Temple of the Lord" receiving airplay on MTV.

== Track listing ==
All tracks composed by Chris Bailey; additional arrangements by Arturo Larizza and Roger Cawkwell

1. "Just Like Fire Would" – 3:24
2. "First Time" – 3:40
3. "Hymn to Saint Jude" – 3:33
4. "See You In Paradise" – 4:20
5. "Love or Imagination" – 3:48
6. "Celtic Ballad" – 2:51
7. "Empty Page" – 3:30
8. "Big Hits (On the Underground)" – 3:07
9. "How to Avoid Disaster" – 2:48
10. "Blues on My Mind" – 2:59
11. "Temple of the Lord" – 3:44
12. "All Fools Day" – 4:50

== Charts ==
Chart (1986)	Peak position
Australia (Kent Music Report)	29

== Personnel ==
The Saints

- Chris Bailey – vocals
- Richard Burgman – guitar
- Arturo Larizza – bass
- Ivor Hay – drums

=== Production ===
- Hugh Jones – Engineer, Mix Engineer, Producer
- Neill King – Mix Engineer
- Chris Bailey – Producer
