= Jonh Ingham =

English music journalist (born 1951)

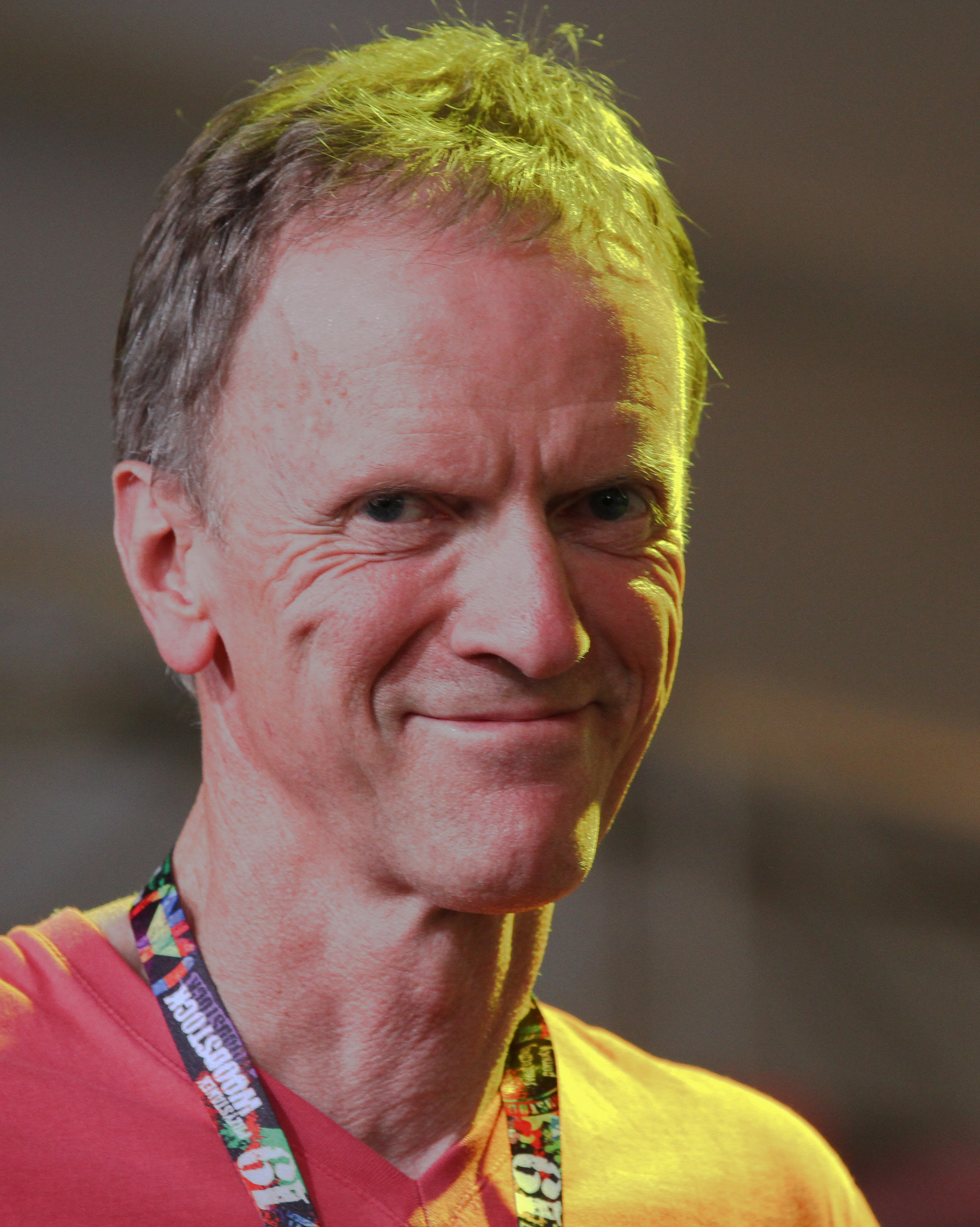
- Jonh Ingham at Przystanek Woodstock in 2013
- Born: Jonh Ingham
- Occupations: Music journalist, entrepreneur, director
- Years active: 1970–

Jonh Ingham (born 1951) is an English entrepreneur who has worked in music journalism, pop band and nightclub management, advertising, internet application development and management consultancy. In the mid-1970s he worked for the British pop music newspaper Sounds, and was a key journalist in the development of the punk rock pop and fashion music movement in the United Kingdom when he published the first press interview with the Sex Pistols.

== Early life ==
Ingham was born in Australia to English parents, and grew up in Australia, Canada, and the USA. He received his formal education at South Eugene High School, Eugene, Oregon, and at the California Institute of the Arts in Los Angeles, where he took a course in pop music criticism from Robert Christgau of The Village Voice; Christgau helped him get his first work as a journalist. Ingham's articles appeared in Rolling Stone, Creem, and other contemporary magazines whilst he was still in college. With Greg Shaw he was instrumental in launching the influential music fanzine Who Put the Bomp.

== Career ==
Moving to London in 1972 to study at the London International Film School, he was employed as a freelance writer for New Musical Express and other London-based pop music magazines, before joining the staff of Sounds. From 1975 to 1977 he wrote high-profile interviews with the Rolling Stones, Jimmy Page, Roxy Music, Tangerine Dream and Queen, and was one of the first journalists to champion London's punk music movement, being the first journalist to hold interviews with the Sex Pistols, and publish gig reviews of the Damned and the Clash.

In early 1977 he left journalism to become co-manager of the pop-punk band Generation X for a year, before relocating back to Los Angeles to work in the film industry. In 1980 he returned to pop music as the manager of the Go-Go's; that group became a leading attraction in L.A.'s local music scene under Ingham's influence, leading to their being signed by I.R.S. Records. Ingham started the Fake Club in 1982, the first of LA's many "temporary" nightclubs that were a part of the city's nightlife in the 1980s, before he relocated to Tokyo in 1985 to work in advertising, where he became fluent in Japanese.

Back in London, from 1996 to 1998 he was CompuServe's Head of Content. In 2000, as Head of Content at music startup Worldpop, he created Europe's first content service for mobile phones. From 2001 to 2006 he was O2's Head of Content. Since 2012 he has been Director of the Archer Business Group, a management consultancy.

Ingham published the book Spirit of '76 – London Punk Eyewitness in 2017, detailing the inception of the punk rock movement in the United Kingdom.

== Publications ==
- Spirit of '76 – London Punk Eyewitness (2017).
