= Imperious Delirium =

Studio album by The Saints
- Released: 2006
- Studio: Stollywood Studios, Amsterdam
- Genre: Punk blues; pop punk
- Label: Cadiz (UK), Wildflower (US)
- Producer: The Saints

The Saints chronology
The Greatest Cowboy Movie Never Made (2006)	Imperious Delirium (2006)	King of the Sun (2012)

Imperious Delirium is the thirteenth studio album released by Australian rock music group The Saints. With Marty Willson-Piper out of the band, The Saints were, for the first time, a trio. Chris Bailey played all the guitar accompaniments on the album.

== Track listing ==
All tracks composed by Chris Bailey; except where indicated

1. "Drunk in Babylon" - 3:43
2. "Declare War" - 3:58
3. "Trocadero" - 3:28
4. "Je Fuckin' T'Aime" - 3:08
5. "Other Side of the World" - 4:05
6. "So Close" - 3:17
7. "Getting Away with Murder" - 3:23
8. "Drowning" (The Saints) - 3:36
9. "Enough Is Never Enough" (The Saints) - 2:52
10. "Learning to Crawl" - 3:26
11. "War of Independence" - 4:58

== Personnel ==
- Chris Bailey – vocals, guitar and production
- Casper Wijnberg – bass, sound engineering and production
- Pete Wilkinson – drums
