= The Monkey Puzzle (The Saints album) =

Studio album by the Saints
- Released: 1981
- Recorded: 1980
- Studio: EMI Studios 301 (Sydney); Polydor (London) (track 2); Studio Du Chesnay (Versailles) (track 11)
- Genre: Punk rock; alternative rock
- Label: Lost EMI Music Australia (Australian 2004 Reissue)
- Producer: Chris Bailey

The Saints chronology
Paralytic Tonight, Dublin Tomorrow (EP) (1980)	The Monkey Puzzle (1981)	Casablanca (1982)

The Monkey Puzzle is the fourth album by the Australian music group the Saints released in 1981. It was the first album to be released after Ed Kuepper left the band.

== Reception ==
Professional ratings
Review scores
Source	Rating
AllMusic	4/5 stars

Roadrunner said, "As an LP, The Monkey Puzzle would have made a fantastic EP. The glory of the four standout tracks is matched only by the mediocrity of everything else on the album. Playing standard and sound quality are so inconsistent that the record as a whole is vaguely annoying."

== Track listing ==
All tracks C.J. Bailey copyright Lost Music\Mushroom Music except "Dizzy Miss Lizzy" by Larry Williams

1. "Miss Wonderful" - 3:33
2. "Always, Always" - 3:50
3. "Paradise" - 3:44
4. "Let's Pretend" - 3:27
5. "Somebody" - 3:55
6. "Monkeys" - 4:38
7. "Mystery Dream" - 3:51
8. "In the Mirror" - 3:48
9. "Simple Love" - 4:20
10. "The Ballad" - 4:25
11. "Dizzy Miss Lizzy" - 3:29

== Charts ==
Chart (1981)	Peak position
Australia (Kent Music Report)	85

== Personnel ==
The Saints

- Chris Bailey - vocals
- Barrington Francis - guitar
- Janine Hall - bass
- Mark Birmingham - drums

with:

- Ivor Hay - keyboards
- Patrick Mathé - harmonica
- The Pig and Monkey Choir - backing vocals

Production

- Gerry Nixon - engineer, mix engineer, producer
- Chris Bailey - producer
