= Howling (The Saints album) =

Studio album by The Saints
- Released: 1996
- Genre: Punk rock
- Label: Amsterdamned/Triple X
- Producer: Lelle Hildebrand

The Saints chronology
Prodigal Son (1988)	Howling (1996)	Everybody Knows the Monkey (1998)

Howling is an album by the Australian band the Saints. The album was their first release after an eight-year recording hiatus. Chris Bailey chose to lose the big production of the 1980s records to make an album that was more akin to the early Saints punk sound. Bailey again employed a new line-up for the band. The album was released in 1996 in Australia and in 1997 everywhere else in the world.

== Critical reception ==
Professional ratings
Review scores
Source	Rating
AllMusic	3/5 stars

The Los Angeles Times called Howling "a tuneful, emotionally intense album in which [Bailey]'s equally at home playing elegantly crafted folk-rock ballads, bluesy, noir-ish extrapolations from Howlin' Wolf and, on 'Shadows', garage-rock that, if it's possible, sounds even more cheaply and haphazardly recorded than the Saints' debut album." The Sydney Morning Herald determined that "the tone is set by the title track, a blunt portrayal of animal lust with its opening invective, driving backbeat and Bailey's tortured vocals, recorded in what sounds as if it is the bottom of a murky swamp."

AllMusic wrote that "with repeated listens, Bailey's knack for a well-developed, melodic tune is revealed, as are a couple of thunderous, paranoid, wild, and totally cracked songs that sound like Bailey has turned psychopathic."

== Track listing ==
All tracks composed by Chris Bailey; except where indicated

1. "Howling" - 4:19
2. "Shadows" - 4:10
3. "Something Somewhere Sometime" - 3:35
4. "Something Wicked" - 3:25
5. "Only Stone" - 3:22
6. "Good Friday" (Bailey, Johnette Napolitano) - 4:23
7. "Blown Away" - 5:14
8. "Last and Laughing Mile" - 4:11
9. "You Know I Know" - 3:30
10. "Only Dreaming" - 3:21
11. "Second Coming" - 3:50
12. "All for Nothing" - 3:33

== Personnel ==
- Chris Bailey - vocals, guitar, occasional organ
- Ian Walsh, Mons Wieslander - guitar
- Joakim Täck - bass, engineering
- Andreas Jornvill - drums
