= Everybody Knows the Monkey =

Studio album by The Saints
- Released: 1998
- Recorded: Studion in Malmö, Sweden
- Genre: Punk rock
- Label: Last Call
- Producer: Chris Bailey, Martin Hennel

The Saints chronology
Howling (1996)	Everybody Knows the Monkey (1998)	Spit the Blues Out (2000)

Professional ratings
Review scores
Source	Rating
Allmusic	3/5 stars

Everybody Knows the Monkey is the tenth studio album released by the Australian rock band The Saints.

== Track listing ==
All tracks composed by Chris Bailey; except where indicated

1. "What Do You Want" - 2:56
2. "Easy Money" - 3:09
3. "Working Overtime" - 4:11
4. "Fall of an Empire" - 4:27
5. "Mustard" - 3:16
6. "Vaguely Jesus" - 3:17
7. "What Are You Waiting For" (Martin Bjerregaard) - 3:28
8. "Everything Turns Sour" - 4:13
9. "Playboy of the Western World" - 3:12
10. "Come Back and Visit" (Michael Bayliss) - 4:13
11. "S+M+M's" - 2:52
12. "Glorious Wonder" - 5:42

== Personnel ==
- Chris Bailey - vocals, guitar
- Andy Faulkner - guitar
- Michael Bayliss - bass
- Martin Bjerregaard - drums

with:

- Johan Stentorp - keyboard contributions
