= This Perfect Day (song) =

Single by The Saints

from the album Eternally Yours
- B-side: "L.I.E.S"
- Released: July 1977 (UK, Australia)
- Recorded: May 1977 ("This Perfect Day"); Sydney, April 1977 ("L.I.E.S.")
- Studio: Roundhouse, London; Wessex, London
- Genre: Hard rock; punk rock
- Length: 2:11
- Label: Harvest HAR5130 (UK); EMI 11529 (Australia)
- Songwriters: Ed Kuepper, Chris Bailey
- Producers: Ed Kuepper, Chris Bailey

The Saints singles chronology
| "Erotic Neurotic" (1977) | "This Perfect Day" (1977) | "Know Your Product" (1977) |

"This Perfect Day" is a single by punk band The Saints. It was produced by Chris Bailey and Ed Kuepper and recorded and mixed at Roundhouse and Wessex Studios, London, in 1977.

The single made #34 in the UK charts, the band's only British Top 40 entry. The band appeared on Top of the Pops to promote the song.

Kuepper later mentioned, "I wrote it on my father's classical guitar, on Christmas Day (1976) at my parents' place when everybody had gone to church."

A re-recorded version of the song later appeared on The Saints' 1978 album Eternally Yours.

The Fall covered the song for their 1999 LP The Marshall Suite. Baby Woodrose covered the song on their 2004 album Dropout!. The song has also been covered by Tropical Fuck Storm (with Amy Taylor of Amyl and the Sniffers on lead vocals), appearing as the b-side to their 2020 single "Suburbiopia".

== Reception ==
Critic Jon Savage said that the song, "speeded up the Rolling Stones "Paint It Black" riff into pure extinction. "This Perfect Day" is almost too fast: The group nearly come off the rails before singer Chris Bailey brings everything to a grinding halt in an extraordinary cluster of negatives." He later said the song was, "the most ferocious single to ever grace the UK Top 40."

Steve Taylor said "This Perfect Day" was, "the band's masterpiece. A short statement of resistance – delivered over a chugging beat and inventively deployed guitar." The Guardian considered the song "quite the most startling, wound-up noise recorded under the punk banner to that point. Bailey spat out the opening lines, atop the band's adrenalised clatter." Mojo called it, "an ultimate expression of teenage nihilism."
