= (I'm) Stranded (song) =

1976 song by The Saints

- UK single picture sleeve

Single by The Saints

from the album (I'm) Stranded
- A-side: "(I'm) Stranded"
- B-side: "No Time"
- Released: September 1976
- Recorded: Bruce Window Studios, Brisbane, Australia; June 1976
- Genre: Punk rock
- Length: 3:25
- Label: Fatal (Australia); MA-7186; Power Exchange (UK); PX-242
- Songwriter(s): Chris Bailey, Ed Kuepper
- Producer(s): The Saints, Mark Moffatt

The Saints singles chronology
"(I'm) Stranded" (1976)	"Erotic Neurotic" (1977)

Australian single
- 1977 EMI reissue of the Australian single

"(I'm) Stranded" is the debut single released by Australian punk rock band the Saints. Issued in September 1976, it has been cited as "one of the iconic singles of the era", and pre-dated vinyl debuts by contemporary punk acts such as the Sex Pistols, Buzzcocks, The Damned and The Clash. In 2001, it was voted among the Top 30 Australian Songs of all time by APRA.

Written by guitarist Ed Kuepper and vocalist Chris Bailey, the single was originally released on the band's own Fatal Records label, with an initial pressing of 500 copies. In the UK, where the single was at first available only on import, Sounds magazine called it "single of this and every week. ... The singing's flat and disinterested, the guitars are on full stun. ... It's fabulous." In 2007, Australian Musician magazine voted this the fourth most significant moment in the history of Australian pop/rock.

On the strength of the single, The Saints were signed in November 1976 to a three-album deal by EMI in the UK. The single was then released in the U.K. on 31 December 1976. The band's first LP was also called (I'm) Stranded. As well as featuring on their debut album, both "(I'm) Stranded" and the single's B-side, "No Time", appeared on a split EP with Stanley Frank in 1977.

In 2007, "(I'm) Stranded" was added to the National Film and Sound Archive's Sounds of Australia registry.

== Background ==
The Saints were formed in Brisbane in 1973, initially calling themselves Kid Galahad and the Eternals. They are considered to be one of the first and most influential punk groups. The Saints rehearsed in the front room of the rented house on Petrie terrace, Brisbane, which happened to be opposite the local police headquarters. By 1975, contemporaneous with the Ramones, The Saints were employing the fast tempos, raucous vocals and "buzzsaw" guitar that characterised early punk rock. Guitarist Ed Kuepper explained that they played faster and faster as they were nervous in front of audiences. The police would often break up their performances, and arrests were frequent. They found it difficult to get bookings in Brisbane and so formed their own promotion company, their own club (Hay's place became the 76 Club) and their own record label.

== Writing and recording ==
Ed Kuepper conceived the melody for "I'm Stranded" in 1974 while on a midnight train ride to the outer suburbs of Brisbane where his parents lived, and wrote the first verse in his bedroom, before giving it to Bailey who wrote the rest.

Prior to the recording session, the band conducted a straw poll amongst their fans on which song to record, with "(I'm) Stranded)" overwhelmingly topping the poll. It was recorded, along with B-side "No Time", in one evening session at Bruce Window Studios in Brisbane in June 1976, with Mark Moffatt engineering. Kuepper told Australian Guitar in 2004: "On the first session, I used a Fender Twin amp and Gibson SG with no effects whatsoever, I just cranked the amp up." However, Moffatt has stated he lent Kuepper his 1960 Fender Super amp because he felt Kuepper's amplifier sounded too clean. The song's "wall-of-sound" effect was achieved by recording another guitar track with a microphone placed in the concrete hallway of the studio. Bailey later claimed that the song was unintentionally sped up in production, but Kuepper has disputed this: "He gets confused because I seldom tuned to concert pitch. The guitar on the single was tuned up 2 semi tones. I would then use chords with open strings to achieve that ringing sound."

Moffatt mixed the songs the next day but drummer Ivor Hay, who picked up the tape, asked him to turn the drums down, telling him that "we're not a drum band". After Moffatt remixed the drums, Kuepper took the tape to Astor Records, where he was employed as a storeman, and had 500 copies pressed. In 2017, Moffatt appealed for information on social media about the mixing desk used for "(I'm) Stranded". It later transpired that a group of ABC engineers acquired the desk in the 1980s and extracted its German-made transformers before disposing the rest of it.

== Promotional film ==
The film clip for the song was directed by Russell Mulcahy and filmed at the band's Petrie Terrace rehearsal space. The video begins with drummer Ivor Hay kicking down the door before the band appears and performs the song.

== Release and UK reaction ==
The band issued the single independently on their own imprint Fatal Records in September 1976, selling it for $2 through their marketing and PR company Eternal Productions, with Kuepper listing his parents' home in Oxley as the mailing address. They sent copies to various local and overseas record companies and music publications. In Great Britain, Sounds reviewer Jonh Ingham called it the "single of this and every week". He continued,

There's a tendency to blabber mindlessly about this single, it's so bloody incredible [...] for some reason Australian record companies think the band lack commercial potential. What a bunch of idiots. You like Quo or the Ramones? This pounds them into the dirt. Hear it once and you'll never forget it. The singing's flat and disinterested, the guitars are on full stun. There's no such thing as a middle eight. It's fabulous.

The song was played by influential DJ John Peel in a special punk-themed edition of his BBC Radio 1 programme, broadcast on 10 December 1976. Bob Geldof of The Boomtown Rats later said, "Rock music in the Seventies was changed by three bands—the Sex Pistols, the Ramones and The Saints". EMI Records in Sydney was contacted by its London head office and told to sign the punk band from Brisbane.

The Saints resisted being re-modelled into the English punk look and were generally ignored by the Australian press at the time, which reported that "a sinister new teenage pop cult, based on sex, sadism and violence, is sweeping Britain." They relocated first to Sydney and then to London, where they were received with excitement on their first regional tour. They did not share the spiky-topped, safety-pinned style of the leading UK punk groups and preferred to be described as "gutsy realists". Kuepper recalled that, nevertheless, they were swept up in the same punk packaging:

The band was a full thing by 1974. Two and a half years later, this incredibly fashionable movement comes along, only an arsehole would have associated himself with that.

On the strength of the single, The Saints were signed in November 1976 to a three-album deal by EMI in the UK. Their first LP was also called (I'm) Stranded. As well as featuring on their debut album, both "(I'm) Stranded" and the single's B-side, "No Time", appeared on a split EP with Stanley Frank in 1977.

== Legacy and influence ==
"Stranded" is generally accepted to be the first punk rock single released outside of the United States, predating the first record releases from the UK punk scene.

== Track listing ==
Both songs written by Ed Kuepper and Chris Bailey.

1. "(I'm) Stranded" – 3:25
2. "No Time" – 2:45

== Charts ==
Chart (1977)	Peak position
Australia (Kent Music Report)	98

== Personnel ==
The Saints members

- Chris Bailey — vocals
- Kym Bradshaw — bass
- Ivor Hay — drums
- Ed Kuepper — guitar

Recording details

- Producer – The Saints, Richard Coe, Mark Moffatt

Art work

- Cover art — Savage Pencil

== Works cited ==
- Nichols, David (2016). Dig: Australian Rock and Pop Music, 1960-85. Verse Chorus Press. ISBN 9781891241611.
- Stafford, Andrew (2006). Pig City: From the Saints to Savage Garden (1st ed.). Australia: University of Queensland Press. ISBN 9780702235610.
