= The Saints (Australian band) =

Australian rock band

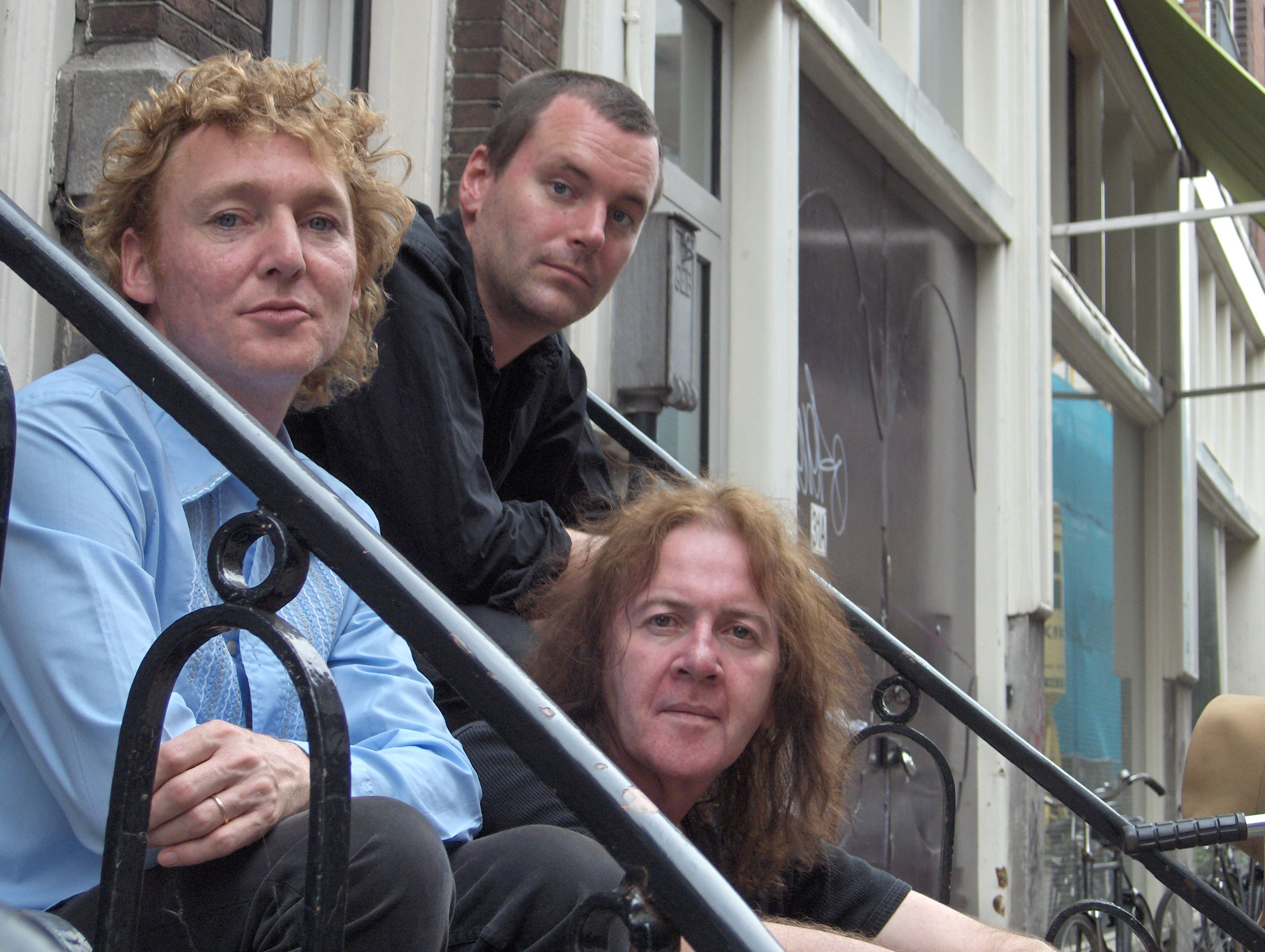
- Then lineup of the Saints in Amsterdam in July 2006. L-R: Peter Wilkinson, Caspar Wijnberg, and Chris Bailey

Background information
- Also known as: Kid Galahad and the Eternals (1973–1974)
- Origin: Brisbane, Queensland, Australia
- Genres: garage rock; alternative rock; punk rock
- Years active: 1973–2022
- Labels: Fire Records UK, Fatal, Power Exchange, EMI, Harvest, Sire, Lost, Mushroom, New Rose, RCA, Blue Rose
- Spinoffs: The Aints!, Laughing Clowns, Tank, Supernaut, The Saints 73–78
- Past members: (see below)
- Website: The Saints site The Saints on Facebook

The Saints were an Australian punk rock band formed in Brisbane, Queensland, in 1973, and were among the earliest internationally recognised bands of the first wave of punk rock. Founded by singer-songwriter Chris Bailey, drummer Ivor Hay, and guitarist-songwriter Ed Kuepper, they were pioneers of punk rock in Australia and played an influential role in the international punk movement.

Unable to get gigs initially, they converted their sharehouse into a venue where they could play. With their debut single "(I'm) Stranded", released in September 1976, they became the first punk band outside the US to release a record, ahead of the first UK punk releases from the Damned, the Sex Pistols and the Clash. They experienced UK chart success in 1977 with the song "This Perfect Day", which peaked at #34. Bassist Kym Bradshaw left in 1977 to join a first-wave British punk rock band, The Lurkers, and was replaced by Algy Ward. Their second album, Eternally Yours, released in 1978, saw the band pursue a bigger and more R&B driven sound, augmented by a horn section.

After their third album, Prehistoric Sounds, released later in 1978, Kuepper clashed with Bailey over the band's musical direction and left, subsequently forming the post-punk group Laughing Clowns, while Hay and Ward followed suit. Bailey, the sole mainstay of the group, continued under the Saints moniker with a rotating lineup of musicians in the ensuing decades. 1986's All Fools Day peaked in the Top 30 on the Australian Kent Music Report Albums Chart in April 1986 and yielded the hit song "Just Like Fire Would". Bailey also forged a solo career, and had relocated to Sweden by 1994. The band was inducted into the Australian Recording Industry Association (ARIA) Hall of Fame in 2001. Bailey died in April 2022.

== History ==
=== 1973–1976: Formative years ===
The Saints' original members were Brisbane schoolmates Bailey, Kuepper and Hay. They had formed Kid Galahad and the Eternals in 1973 with Belfast-raised Bailey on vocals, Brisbane-born Hay on piano and German-born Kuepper on guitar. Their musical inspirations came from 1950s rock 'n' roll musicians such as Little Richard and Elvis Presley (their name referenced his 1962 film Kid Galahad) and 1960s proto-punk bands like the Missing Links, the Stooges and MC5. They rehearsed in a shed at the back of Hay's place, which was opposite the local police headquarters.

The band renamed themselves the Saints in 1974, inspired by Leslie Charteris's character The Saint. They played covers of Del Shannon, Connie Francis and Ike and Tina Turner – "exploding them almost beyond recognition with energy". Jeffrey Wegener joined on drums and Hay switched to bass guitar. Wegener had left by 1975, Hay moved to drums and Kym Bradshaw joined on bass guitar. Contemporaneous with Ramones, the group were employing the fast tempos, raucous vocals and "buzz saw" guitar that characterised early punk rock. Kuepper explained that they played faster and faster as they were nervous in front of audiences. The police would often break up their gigs, and arrests were frequent. Unable to obtain bookings, Bailey and Hay converted the Petrie Terrace house they shared into the 76 Club so they had a venue to play in. According to Australian rock historian, Ian McFarlane, they had developed their "own distinctive sound as defined by Kuepper's frenetic, whirlwind guitar style and Bailey's arrogant snarl".

=== 1976–1977: (I'm) Stranded ===
In June 1976, the Saints recorded two self-produced tracks, "(I'm) Stranded" and "No Time" with Mark Moffatt engineering (label credits for both sides say 'Produced by The Saints'). Unable to find any interested label, they formed Fatal Records and independently released their debut single in September. Their self-owned Eternal Promotions sent discs to radio stations and magazines both in Australia – with little local interest – and United Kingdom. In the UK, a small label, Power Exchange, issued the single. Sounds magazine's reviewer, Jonh Ingham, declared it, "Single of this and every week". EMI head office in London contacted the Sydney branch and directed that they be signed to a three-album contract. Over two days in December, the group recorded their first LP, (I'm) Stranded (February 1977), with Rod Coe producing. It included a cover version of the Missing Links' track "Wild About You". They supported AC/DC in late December 1976 and, early in 1977, relocated to Sydney. EMI re-issued the single, "(I'm) Stranded" in February and it reached the Kent Music Report Top 100 Singles Chart.

The Saints resisted being re-modelled into the English punk look and were generally ignored by the Australian press. Mainstream public was warned that punk rock is "a sinister new teenage pop cult, based on sex, sadism and violence, [which] is sweeping Britain." In May 1977, the band released their second single, "Erotic Neurotic" and then moved to the UK, where they differed with their label over how they should be marketed. EMI planned to promote them as a typical punk band, complete with ripped clothes and spiky hair – the Saints insisted on maintaining a more downbeat image. In June, bass guitarist Alasdair "Algy" Ward replaced Bradshaw. Their next single "This Perfect Day" (July) peaked at No. 34 in the UK but further improvement was frustrated by EMI's failure to press enough copies to satisfy demand.

They were kind of god-like to me and my colleagues. They were just always so much better than everybody else. It was extraordinary to go and see a band that was so anarchic and violent.

— Nick Cave

=== 1978–1979: Eternally Yours and Prehistoric Sounds ===
The Saints released their second album, Eternally Yours, in May 1978 on EMI/Harvest with Bailey and Kuepper producing. The album showed the band moving towards a more R&B style of rock, including a brass section on songs like "Know Your Product" which had been released as a single in February. Another track, "Private Affair", focussed on what the band members saw as the pigeon-holing, hype and commercialisation of punk. The album reached the Top 100 on the Australian Kent Music Report Albums Chart.

The jazz-blues influenced third album, Prehistoric Sounds, followed in October 1978 (January 1979 in Australia). Its commercial failure led EMI to drop the band. During 1978, relations between Kuepper and Bailey had deteriorated, with Bailey preferring rock and pop songs and Kuepper pursuing less commercial and more intellectual material. Finally Hay, Kuepper and Ward left the group in early 1979. Kuepper returned to Australia and followed a more avant-garde direction with Laughing Clowns, which would frequently feature brass, and later, the punkish the Aints. He is one of Australia's most influential and highly regarded musicians with over twenty solo albums to his credit. Hay briefly returned to Australia to join Sydney-based the Hitmen and then rejoined Bailey in London for a later version of the Saints. Ward became a member of English gothic punk band, the Damned. Bailey continued the group with Mark Birmingham on drums, Bruce Callaway on guitar, Barry Francis on guitar and Janine Hall on bass guitar.

=== 1980s: Paralytic Tonight, Dublin Tomorrow to Prodigal Son ===
The Saints' first release after Kuepper's departure was the EP, Paralytic Tonight, Dublin Tomorrow, in March 1980 on Lost Records with Bailey producing. It was followed by a studio album, The Monkey Puzzle, co-produced by Bailey and Gerry Nixon for Mushroom Records in February 1981. It reached the Top 100 on the Australian Albums Chart. They had shifted to a more melodic pop-rock sound and included Hay on keyboards in the line-up. Hay left again before the next album was released in Australia in 1982 as I Thought This Was Love, But This Ain't Casablanca on Mushroom Records and elsewhere as Out in the Jungle... Where Things Ain't So Pleasant on New Rose Records. Production was credited to Ricardo Mentalban, and with Bailey, in the Saints, were Hall on bass guitar and Iain Shedden (ex-Jolt) on drums. Additional musicians included Roger Crankwell on saxophone and clarinet, Denis Haines on piano, Paul Neiman on trombone, Steve Sidwell on trumpet and Jess Sutcliffe on piano. The Damned's Brian James guested on lead guitar.

In late 1982, the group toured Australia with Bailey, Hall and Shedden joined by Chris Burnham on guitar (ex-Supernaut) and Laurie Cuffe on guitar. In 1983, Bailey released his first solo album, Casablanca, on New Rose. In 1984, Bailey was based in Sydney, and the Saints' album, A Little Madness to Be Free, was released in July on RCA with production credited to Lurax Debris (Bailey's pseudonym). It contains the popular track "Ghost Ships", which was issued as a single in May. A Little Madness to Be Free was "more rock-oriented, with extensive use of acoustic guitar, brass and strings set among tightly focused arrangements". In mid-1984, the band toured as Bailey, Burnham, Shedden and Tracy Pew on bass guitar, (ex-Birthday Party), who was briefly replaced by Kuepper in July. By 1985, the Saints were Bailey, Richard Burgman on guitar (ex-Sunnyboys) and Arturo 'Archie' Larizza on bass guitar (the Innocents), while Louise Elliot on saxophone and Jeffrey Wegener on drums (both ex-Laughing Clowns) completed the line-up. A live album, Live in a Mud Hut ... Somewhere in Europe, recorded in 1984 with production credited to Mugumbo, was released by New Rose in 1985.

Hay returned and, with Bailey, Burgman and Larizza, the group recorded All Fools Day in Wales with Hugh Jones producing. It was issued by Mushroom Records in Australia and Polydor in United States, in April 1986. The album reached the Top 30 in Australia and included a Top 30 single, "Just Like Fire Would" (March). The group joined the Australian Made Tour in December 1986 – January 1987 with other local acts Mental as Anything, I'm Talking, the Triffids, Divinyls, Models, Jimmy Barnes and INXS.

Prodigal Son followed in April 1988, which reached the Top 50. The line-up was Bailey, Francis, Larizza, Shedden and Joe Chiofalo on organ. It was produced by Bailey, Brian McGee and Vanda & Young. The single, "Grain of Sand", from Prodigal Son peaked at No. 11 on the United States Billboard Alternative Songs chart. In March 1989, the Saints had an Australian Top 40 hit with a cover of the Easybeats' song "Music Goes 'Round My Head", which also featured in the 1988 film Young Einstein's soundtrack. Their version of "The Music Goes Round My Head" reached No. 19 on the US Alternative Songs chart.

=== 1990–present: Later years, reunions, spinoffs and deaths ===
The Saints issued a compilation album, Songs of Salvation and Sin 1976–1988 in 1990 on Raven Records with liner notes penned by Glenn A. Baker. Over the years, Kuepper had grown unhappy with Bailey's ongoing use of the Saints name and, in particular, with Baker crediting Bailey for the band's original creative direction. In April 1991, Kuepper formed the Aints, which performed versions of vintage the Saints' material. The Saints issued Permanent Revolution in 1991 on Mushroom Records, and while Bailey released solo albums, the group went into hiatus.

By 1994, Bailey had moved to Sweden where he recorded a solo album, 54 days at sea, and in 1996 issued the Saints' album, Howling, which was produced by the band for Blue Rose Records. Bailey provided vocals, guitars and organ, and was joined by Andreas Jornvill on drums, Joakim Täck on bass guitar, Ian Walsh on guitar and Mons Wieslander on guitar. The group toured Australia in February 1997 – their first tour there in eight years. Everybody Knows the Monkey followed in May 1998 on Last Call Records with Bailey were Michael Bayliss on bass guitar, Martin Bjerregaard on drums and Andy Faulkner on guitar – it was produced by Bailey and Martin Hennel.

Mushroom Records celebrated their 25th anniversary with the Mushroom 25 Live concert in November 1998; Bailey performed "Ghost Ships" and "Just Like Fire Would", and a duet with Paul Kelly on "Wide Open Road", as a tribute to David McComb of the Triffids.

Spit the Blues Out was issued in 2000 in France by Last Call Records with production credited to Debris. It displayed "'60s-era blues-rock" and "Brit-pop" influences, with Patrick Mathé of French label New Rose providing harmonica and guitar.

On 11 September 2001, the original line-up of the Saints came together for a one-off reunion when the writer Clinton Walker, a long-time friend and champion of the band, inducted them into the Australian Recording Industry Association (ARIA) Hall of Fame.

By 2005, the group had re-located to Amsterdam, Netherlands - with Bailey were the line-up of Marty Willson-Piper on guitar, Caspar Wijnberg on bass guitar and Pete Wilkinson on drums. They issued Nothing Is Straight in My House in 2005, and after Willson-Piper left they released Imperious Delirium in 2006. They undertook a European tour to promote it and continued to tour America through late 2007.

On 14 July 2007, Bailey, Kuepper and Hay re-united for another one-off gig at the Queensland Music Festival, with current member Wijnberg on bass guitar. In January 2009, as part of the All Tomorrows Parties touring festival, in this instance curated by Mick Harvey formerly of The Birthday Party, the Saints with Bailey, Hay, Kuepper and Larizza played shows in Brisbane, Sydney and in Mount Buller, Victoria. This was followed by a Melbourne show on 14 January as part of the Don't Look Back sideshow concerts, where they performed the I'm Stranded album in its entirety. In 2010 the band returned to a three piece with Wilkinson returning as drummer and to the line-up, and the addition of new bassist Jane Mack. In May 2010, Kuepper and Bailey reunited for a month-long tri-residency series of shows in Brisbane, Sydney and Melbourne. With Kuepper on electric guitar/vocals and Bailey on acoustic guitar/bass guitar/vocals, they played a selection of songs from early Saints, both solo careers, and post-Kuepper Saints, as well as a few covers.

2012 saw the release of King of the Sun. The album was recorded at the Trackdown studios in Sydney, where Bailey had previously recorded Savage Entertainment. Released in Australia in late 2012, King of the Sun was delayed in European countries until April 2013. The following year, the album was repackaged as a double album with a second LP, King of the Midnight Sun - the same songs recorded with a different line-up.

On 7 November 2013, the Saints appeared as a 4-piece at the Borderline club in London, England. Alongside Bailey were stalwart Saints Barrington Francis and Peter Wilkinson. The band was augmented with Chris Dunne on keyboards.

In 2017, a mural dedicated to the Saints and their song "(I'm) Stranded" was enacted on Roma Street, Brisbane. The mural included lyrics from the song and is situated close to 4 Petrie Terrace, the location previously used by the band as an unlicensed venue.

In 2021, the State Library of Queensland named its copy of "(I'm) Stranded" as one of the treasures from its John Oxley Library collection, citing the 7” vinyl single represented a piece of Australian and Queensland music history, influencing generations of bands around the world.

Chris Bailey died on 9 April 2022, aged 65.

In mid-2024, a remastered box set edition of The Saints' first album was announced, with Kuepper and Hay forming a new spinoff, The Saints 73–78, to tour the 50th anniversary of (I'm) Stranded. The band also featured Mick Harvey of Nick Cave and the Bad Seeds on keyboards and guitar, Peter Oxley of Sunnyboys on bass and Mark Arm from Mudhoney on vocals.

== Influence ==
The Saints were one of the first and most influential punk rock groups. According to Bob Geldof, "Rock music in the seventies was changed by three bands—the Sex Pistols, the Ramones and the Saints".

In May 2001, Australasian Performing Right Association (APRA) celebrated its 75th anniversary and named "(I'm) Stranded" in its Top 30 Australian songs of all time. The band was inducted into the Australian Recording Industry Association (ARIA) Hall of Fame in September. In 2007, "I'm Stranded" was one of the first 20 songs stored on the National Film and Sound Archive's Sounds of Australia registry. Their début album, (I'm) Stranded was listed at No. 20 in the book, 100 Best Australian Albums, in October 2010. Their third album, Prehistoric Sounds, also appeared in the list, at No. 41.

In a tribute published on his Red Hand Files Q&A platform, Nick Cave remembered Bailey as “perhaps the greatest and most anarchic rock 'n' roll singer Australia would ever produce”.

== Band members ==
=== Final line-up ===
- Chris Bailey – lead vocals (1973–2022; his death), guitar (1980–1983, 1984–1986, 1989–1990, 1991–1996, 1996–2012, 2016–2022), bass (1973–1974, 1989–1996, 2010–2016)
- Peter Wilkinson – drums (1999–2002, 2003, 2005–2009, 2010–2016, 2017–2022)
- Davey Lane – guitar (2016–2022)
- Pat Bourke – bass (2016–2022)

=== Former members ===
- Ivor Hay – drums (1973–1974, 1975–1980, 1981–1982, 1985–1988, 2009, 2024), keyboards, organ (1973–1982, 1984–1987, 2009), bass (1973–1975)
- Ed Kuepper – guitar (1973–1979, 2004, 2009, 2024)
- John Sawyer – drums, March to September 1974
- Jeffrey Wegener – drums (1974–1975, 1985)
- Roland Desainis – drums (1975)
- Doug Balmanno – bass (1975)
- Kym Bradshaw – bass (1975–1977)
- Algy Ward – bass (1977–1980; died 2023)
- Bruce Callaway – guitar (1979–1980)
- Janine Hall – bass (1979–1982, 1984–1985; died 2008)
- Barry Francis – guitar (1979–1989, 2013–2016)
- Mark Birmingham – drums (1980–1981)
- Iain Shedden – drums (1982–1983, 1984–1985, 1988–1990, 2002, 2004, 2016–2017; his death)
- Chris Burnham – guitar (1982, 1989–1990)
- Laurie Cuffe – drums (1983–1984), guitar (1984–1986)
- Tracy Pew – bass (1984; died 1986)
- Richard Burgman – guitar (1985)
- Louise Elliott – saxophone (1985)
- Arturo Larizza – bass (1986–1989, 2002, 2004, 2009)
- Joe Chiofalo – keyboards (1987–1988, 1991)
- Dror Erez – keyboards (1991)
- Tony Faehse – guitar (1991–1992)
- Peter Jones – drums (1991)
- Dave Sparks – guitar (1991–1992)
- Michael Bayliss – bass (1996–2004)
- Marty Bjerregaard – drums (1996–1999)
- Andy Faulkner – guitar (1996–2004)
- Andreas Jörnvill – drums (1996)
- Joakim Täck – bass (1996)
- Ian Walsh – guitar (1996)
- Måns Wieslander – guitar (1996)
- Eddie Nyström – guitar (2002)
- Marty Willson-Piper – guitar (2004–2005)
- Caspar Wijnberg – bass (2004–2010)
- Jane Mack – bass (2006–2010)
- Sean Carey – guitar (2012–2013)

== Discography ==
- (I'm) Stranded (1977)
- Eternally Yours (1978)
- Prehistoric Sounds (1978)
- The Monkey Puzzle (1981)
- Casablanca (1982)
  - aka Out in the Jungle... Where Things Ain't So Pleasant
- A Little Madness to Be Free (1984)
- All Fools Day (1986)
- Prodigal Son (1988)
- Howling (1996)
- Everybody Knows the Monkey (1998)
- Spit the Blues Out (2000)
- Nothing Is Straight in My House (2005)
- Imperious Delirium (2006)
- King of the Sun (2012)
- Long March Through the Jazz Age (2025)

== See also ==
- Brisbane punk rock
