= Chris Bailey (musician, born 1956) =

Australian musician (1956–2022)

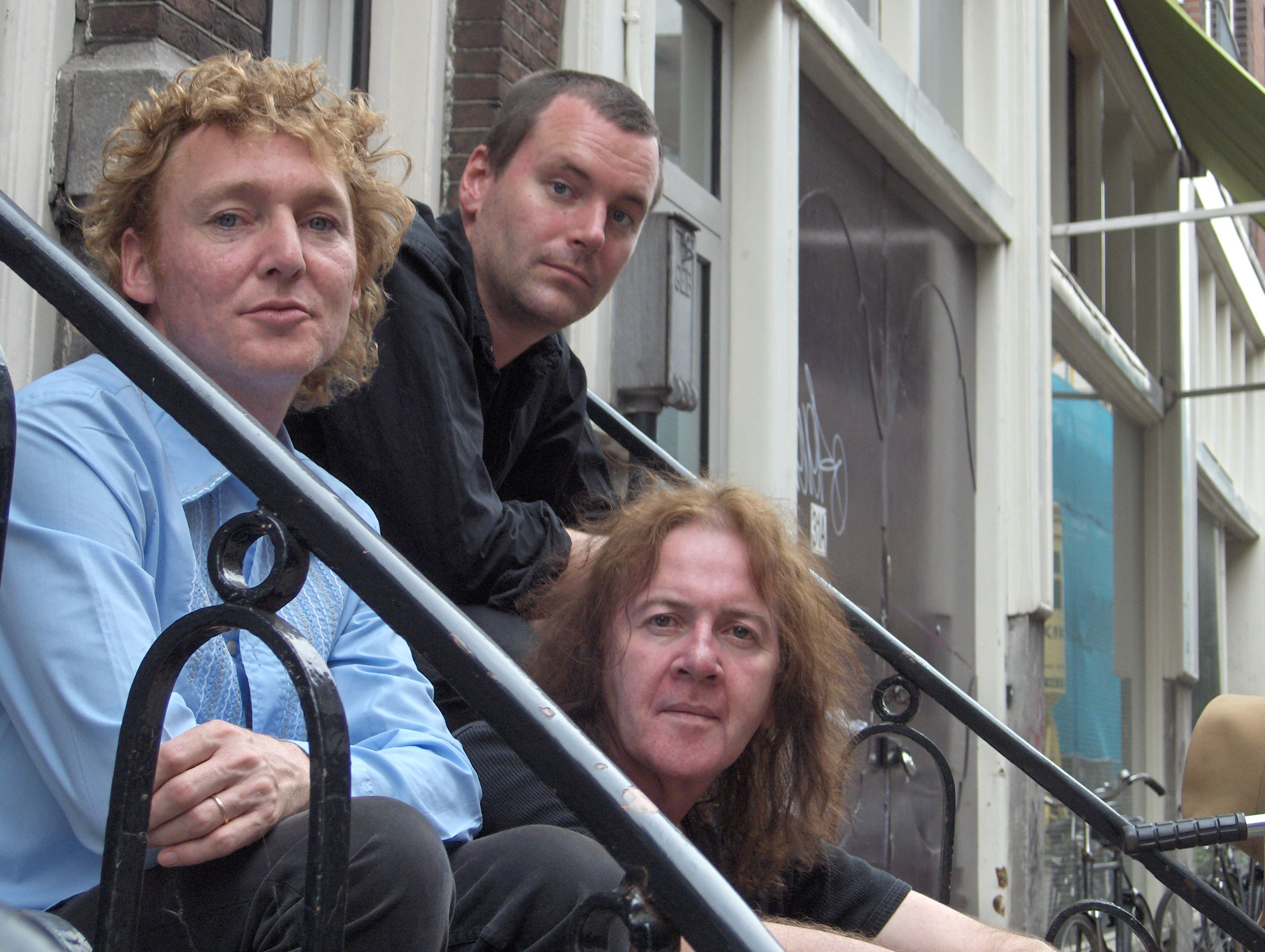
- Bailey (right) with Peter Wilkinson and Caspar Wijnberg, in Amsterdam in 2006

Background information
- Born: Christopher James Mannix Bailey; 29 November 1956; Nanyuki, Colony of Kenya
- Origin: Brisbane, Queensland, Australia
- Died: 9 April 2022 (aged 65) Haarlem, Netherlands
- Genres: Punk rock, post-punk, blues, grunge, folk
- Occupations: Singer-songwriter, instrumentalist, record producer
- Instruments: Vocals, guitar
- Years active: 1976–2022
- Label: Highway 125
- Formerly of: Kid Galahad and The Eternals; The Saints; The Chris Bailey Combo; Chris Bailey and The General Dog
- Website: saintsmusic.com

Christopher James Mannix Bailey (29 November 1956 – 9 April 2022) was an Australian singer, songwriter, musician and producer. He was the co-founder and singer of the rock band the Saints.

== Early life ==
Bailey was born in Nanyuki, Colony of Kenya, to Northern Irish parents. He grew up in Belfast, Northern Ireland, until the age of seven when his family migrated to Australia. His family settled in Inala in Brisbane, Queensland. He and his sister Margaret attended Inala State High School, Oxley State High School and Corinda State High School, where Ed Kuepper and Ivor Hay were also students.

== Career ==
=== The Saints ===
Bailey, Kuepper and Hay formed the Saints in 1973. The bands's first significant success was in the UK with the punk anthem "(I'm) Stranded". The band slowly evolved toward a more sophisticated sound on their next few albums. Bailey continued to lead the band into the 1980s. A cover of the Easybeats' "The Music Goes Round My Head" was issued as a single in December 1988 and featured on the soundtrack to the film Young Einstein.

=== Later activities ===
In 1991, Bailey formed the Chris Bailey Combo which included Paul Hester, Nick Seymour and Dror Erez as well as a revolving cast of guest players.

Demons was Bailey's second solo album, recorded in Memphis, Tennessee, where he had been sent by TVT Records. Savage Entertainment was released in October 1992. In 1993, Bailey wrote and recorded with Concrete Blonde's Johnette Napolitano, including a reworking of the song "All Fools' Day". Bailey's fourth solo album, 54 Days ... at Sea, was recorded in Malmö, Sweden, and was released in 1994. It featured Bolivian folk musicians Mundo Folk, whom Bailey had seen busking when visiting friends in Sweden the previous year. Swedish musicians Eddie Nyström (guitar), Magnus Börjeson (bass) and Stellan Colt (drums) provided the rock base for the album. For the Earth Music compilation, issued in June 1994, Bailey contributed a cover of Tim Finn's "Not Even Close".

After several years of solo adventure, Bailey revived the Saints to record Howling in 1996. This album was followed by Everybody Knows the Monkey (1998), Spit the Blues Out (2002), Nothing is Straight in My House (2005), Imperious Delirium (2006) and King of the Sun (2012-Australia, 2013-Europe) which were all recorded under the name of the Saints. When Mushroom Music celebrated its 25th anniversary in 1998, Bailey was one of the invited artists to perform on a stage at the Melbourne Cricket Ground in front of an audience of about 100,000 people. He performed solo two of his most famous songs, "Ghost Ships", and "Just Like Fire Would", and also a duet with Paul Kelly on "Wide Open Road", a tribute to the late David McComb of the Triffids. In 2003, Bailey made a guest appearance singing the chorus vocals on "Bring It On" on Nick Cave and the Bad Seeds album Nocturama. Bailey then toured America with the group and performed with them on the Late Show with David Letterman. At the 2005 Queensland Poetry festival in Brisbane, held at the Judith Wright Arts Centre, Bailey headlined the event.

Bailey and the General Dog was another of Bailey's constellations, their last record being Bone Box in 2005. In 2007, Bailey undertook a solo tour of France, on occasion as a double act with French rock artist Mickaël Furnon (alias Mickey) from the rock group Mickey 3D.

== Death ==
Chris Bailey died in Haarlem on 9 April 2022 aged 65.

== Discography ==
=== Solo albums ===
- Casablanca (1983)
- What we did on our holidays (1984)
- Demons (1991)
- Savage Entertainment (1992)
- 54 Days at Sea (1994)
- Encore (1995)
- Bone Box (2005)
